= Plover Cove Country Park =

Country park in New Territories, Hong Kong

Coordinates: 22.5206°N 114.2447°E

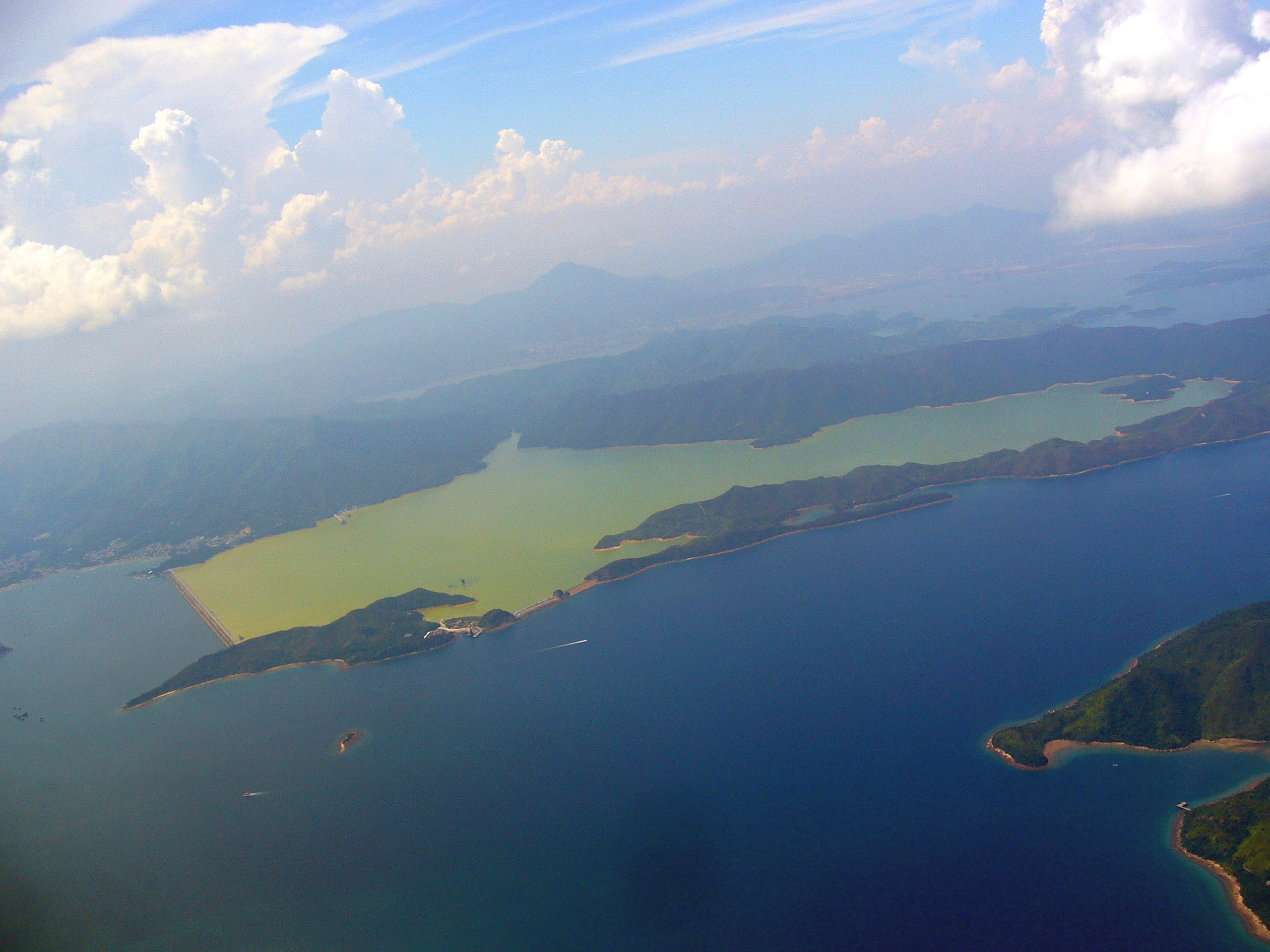
- Plover Cove as viewed from a plane
- Interactive map of Plover Cove Country Park
- Established: 7 April 1978; 47 years ago
- Governing body: Agriculture, Fisheries and Conservation Department

Plover Cove Country Park
- Traditional Chinese: 船灣郊野公園
- Simplified Chinese: 船湾郊野公园
- Literal meaning: Boat Bay Country Park
Transcriptions
Standard Mandarin
- Hanyu Pinyin: Chuánwān Jiāoyě Gōngyuán
Hakka
- Romanization: Sòn-Vân-káu-yâ-kûng-yèn
Yue: Cantonese
- Jyutping: syun^{4}waan^{1}gaau^{1}je^{5}gung^{1}jyun^{4}

Plover Cove Country Park (Chinese: 船灣郊野公園) is a country park in Hong Kong located in the Northeastern New Territories. The original country park was established on 7 April 1978, covering 4,594 hectares (11,350 acres) of natural terrain in the administrative North District and Tai Po District. A northern extension to the park, Plover Cove (Extension) Country Park, was designated on 1 June 1979, covering the Double Haven islets and Ping Chau.

== Ecology ==
Wild animals residing in the woodlands include Malayan porcupine, Chinese ferret-badger, Chinese pangolin, leopard cat and Pallas's squirrel. There have been records of Indian cuckoo and red-winged crested cuckoo on Kat O and in Lai Chi Wo inside the park.

New and rare species of butterflies in Hong Kong such as yellow coster and bi-spot royal were discovered in the country park recently. Wu Kau Tang and Lai Chi Wo are especially rich in butterflies.

== Scenic spots ==
Bride's Pool, a waterfall plunge pool, is only 25 metres (82 ft) in diameter and 2 metres (6 ft 7 in) deep, known among Hongkongers for the folklore tale that recounts how a bride drowned here on her way to her wedding.

Geological formations feature in the country park –Ping Chau, Ma Shi Chau and Wong Chuk Kok Tsui all contain some of the oldest rock formations in Hong Kong.

Hiking trails within the country park include the Bride's Pool Nature Trail, Tai Mei Tuk Family Walk, Chung Pui Tree Walk, Wu Kau Tang Country Trail and Ping Chau Country Trail in the Plover Cove (Extension) Country Park.

== Plover Cove (Extension) Country Park ==
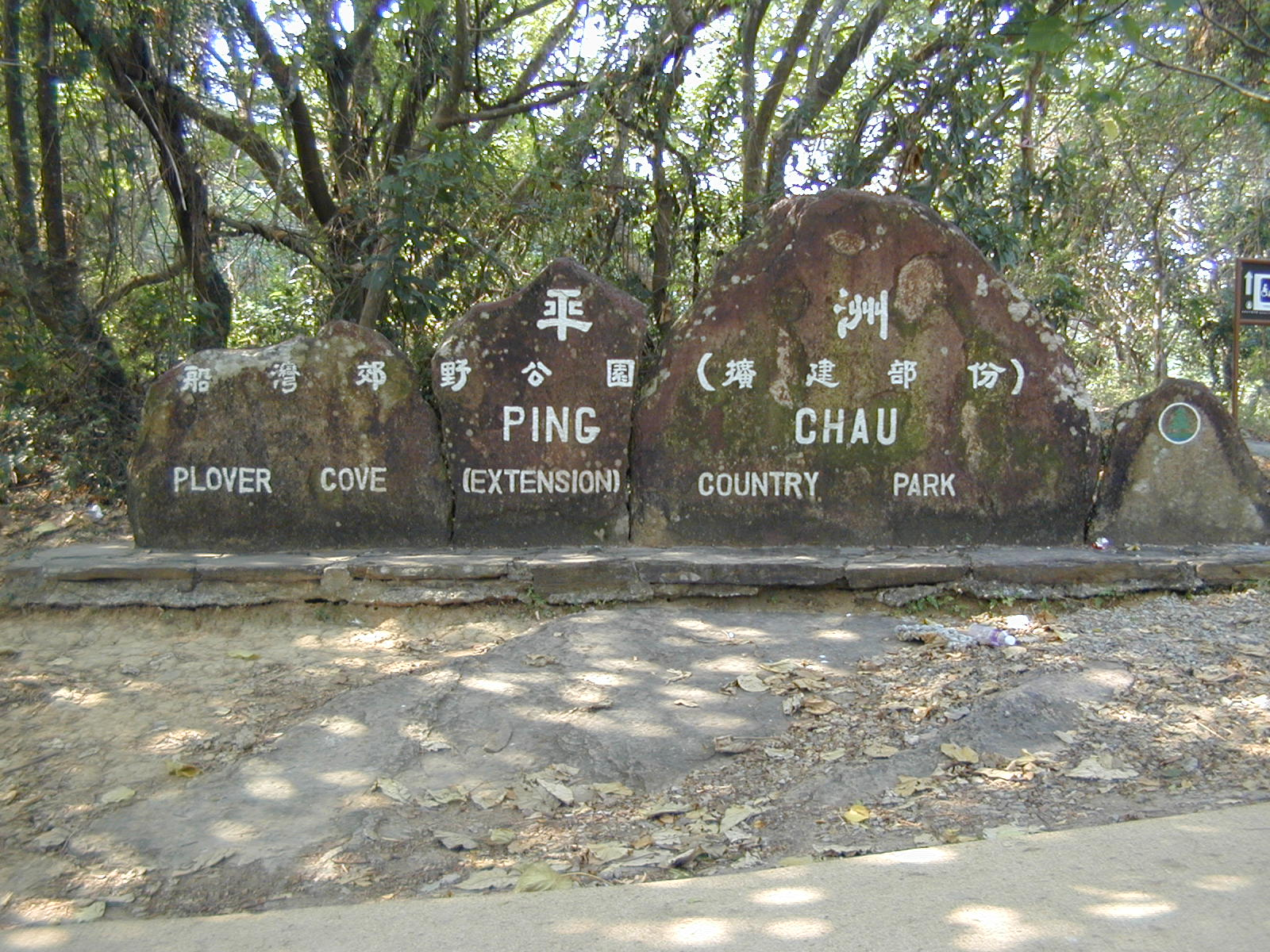
Plover Cove (Extension) Country Park sign on Ping Chau

The northern extension of Plover Cove Country Park was designated in 1979. It includes the Double Haven islets and Yan Chau Tong Marine Park. Islands within this part of the park include: Ping Chau (Tung Ping Chau) in Mirs Bay, three islets of Double Haven: Yan Chau, Pak Ka Chau and Pak Sha Tau Tsui. Other islands: Crooked Island, Tui Min Chau, Crescent Island, Double Island, Wu Yeung Chau and Port Island opposite Long Harbour and Tolo Channel.

== See also ==
- Conservation in Hong Kong
- Plover Cove
- Plover Cove Reservoir
