= Wong Nai Chau =

Wong Nai Chau (Chinese: 黃泥洲) is the name of three islands in Hong Kong:

- Wong Nai Chau, within Yan Chau Tong Marine Park, in North District
- Wong Nai Chau, off Yeung Chau, in North District
- Wong Nai Chau in Sai Kung District
