= Wong Chuk Kok Hoi =

Channel in Hong Kong

Coordinates: 22.50749°N 114.31605°E

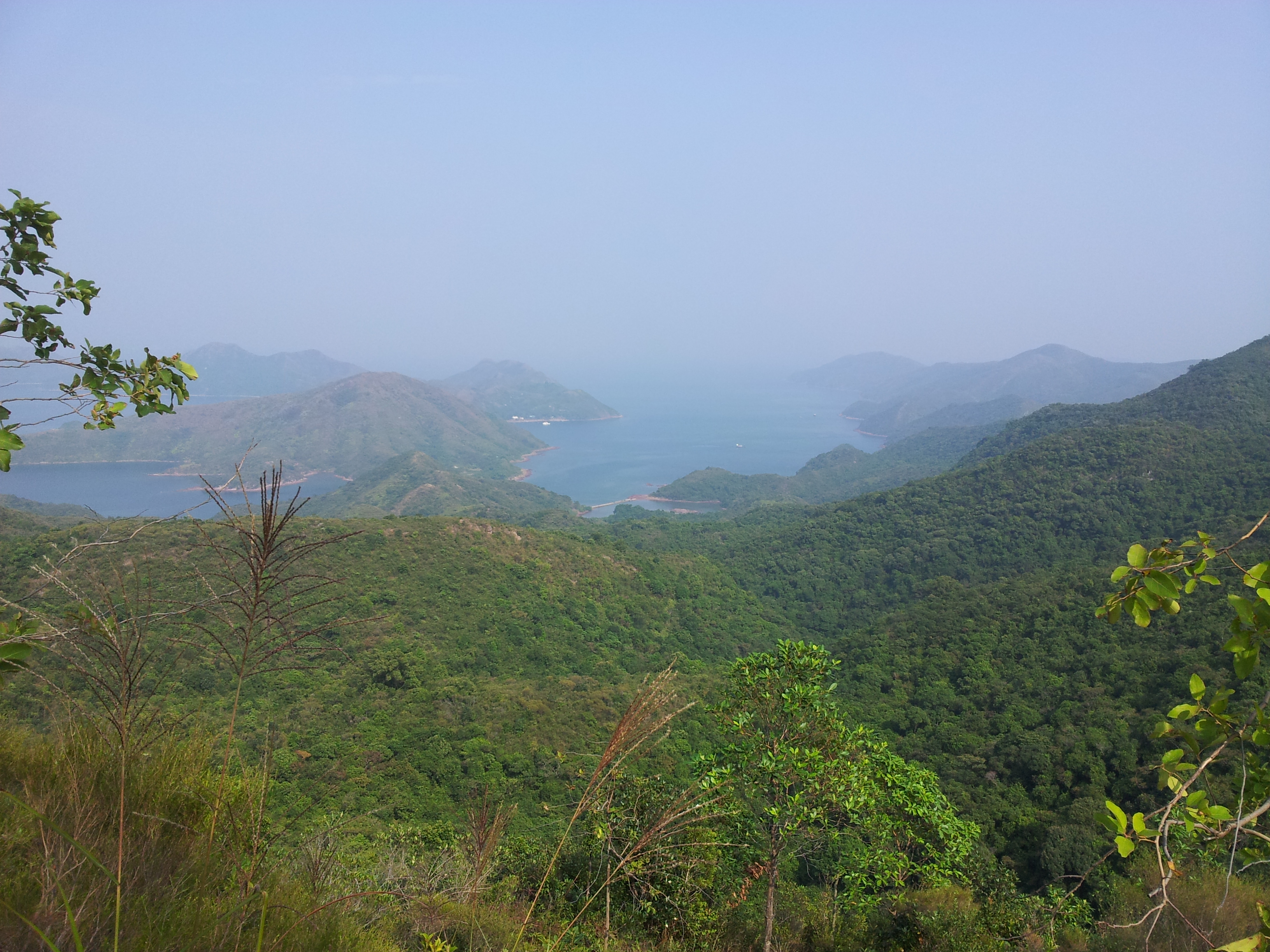
View of Wong Chuk Kok Hoi (center). Double Island is to its left.

Wong Chuk Kok Hoi (Chinese: 黃竹角海) is a channel in North District, Hong Kong, part of Mirs Bay.

It is located between the Wong Chuk Kok Peninsula in the south and Double Island in the north.

Wong Chuk Kok Hoi has been designated as one of the 28 designated marine fish culture zones in Hong Kong.

== See also ==
- Wong Chuk Kok Tsui
