= Sai Ap Chau =

Island in Hong Kong

Coordinates: 22.551667°N 114.261667°E

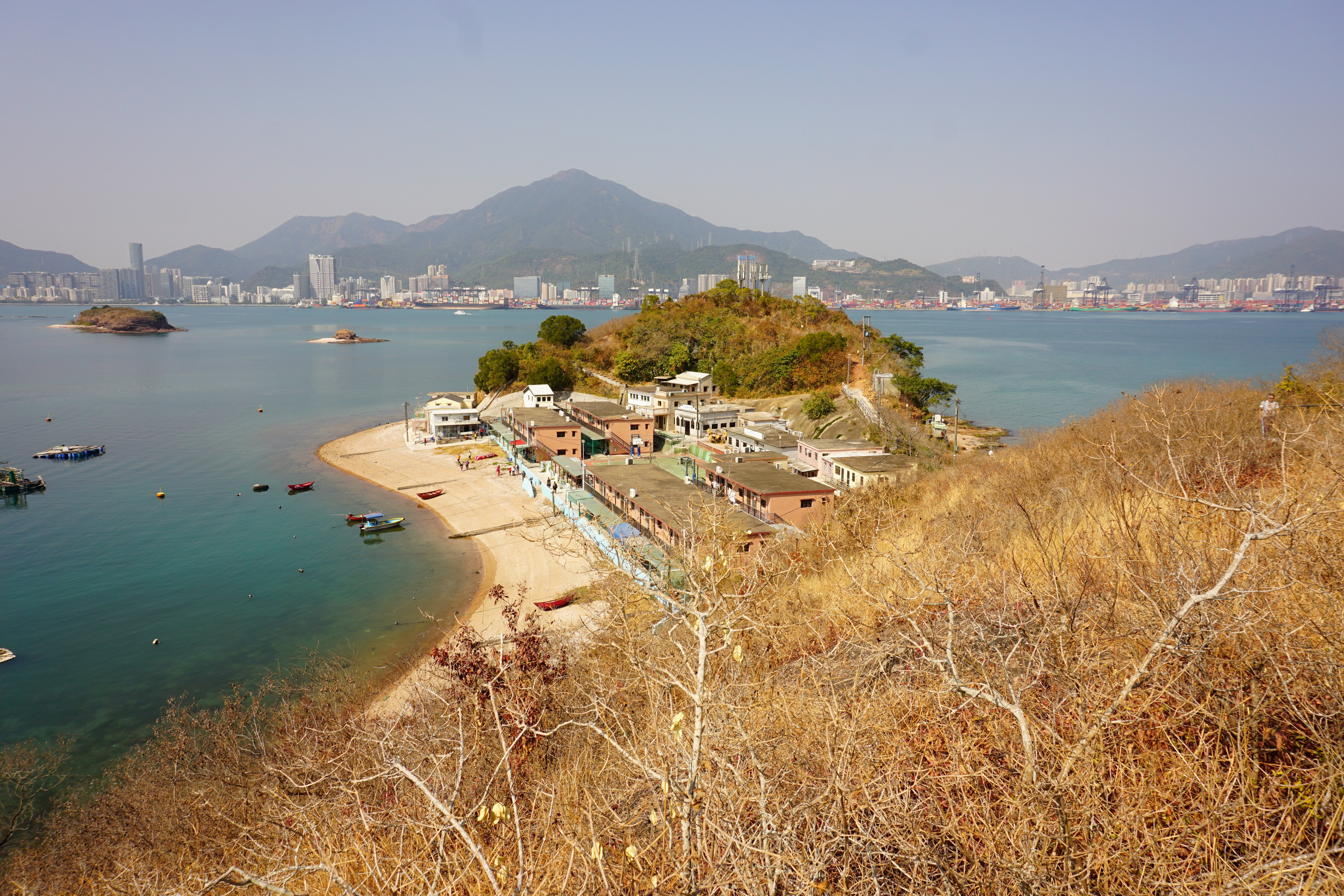
View of Shenzhen from Ap Chau. The islet on the left is Sai Ap Chau. The smaller islet between Sai Ap Chau and Ap Chau is Ap Lo Chun.

Sai Ap Chau (Chinese: 細鴨洲) is a small island in the New Territories of Hong Kong. It is under the administration of North District.

== Location ==
Sai Ap Chau is located in Ap Chau Bay (鴨洲海; Ap Chau Hoi) of Crooked Harbour, west of Ap Chau (鴨洲).
