= Ap Lo Chun =

Island in Hong Kong

Native name: Chinese: 鴨籮春
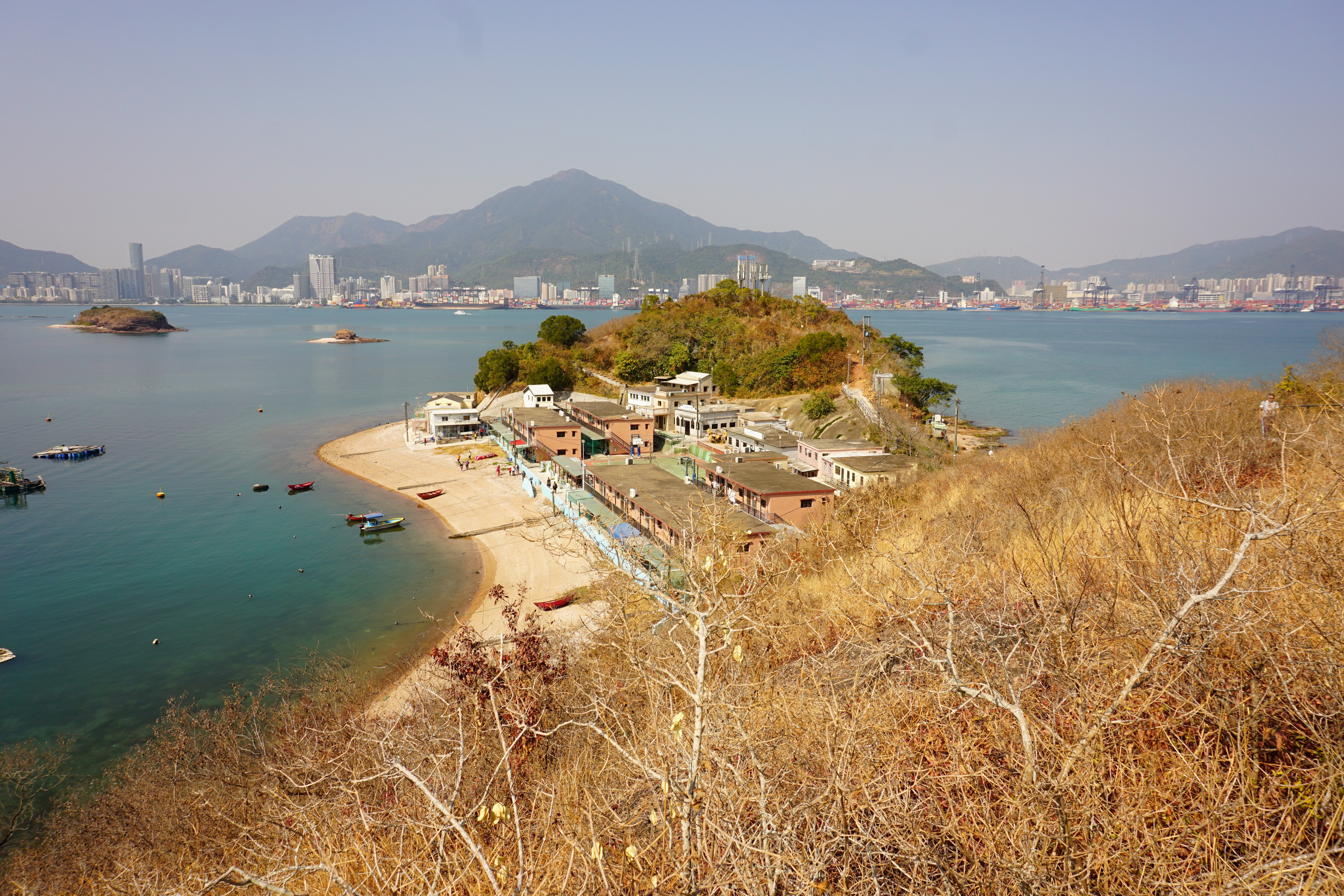
- View of Shenzhen from Ap Chau. Ap Lo Chun is the first islet on the left off the coast of Ap Chau. The islet further left is Sai Ap Chau.

- Location within Hong Kong

Geography
- Location: Ap Chau Bay, Crooked Harbour, Hong Kong
- Coordinates: 22.552469°N 114.264856°E

Administration
- China

Demographics
- Population: None

Additional information
- Time zone: HKT (UTC+8:00)

Ap Lo Chun (Chinese: 鴨籮春) is a small island in the New Territories of Hong Kong. It is under the administration of North District.

== Location ==
Ap Lo Chun is located in Ap Chau Bay (鴨洲海; Ap Chau Hoi) of Crooked Harbour, between Ap Chau (鴨洲) in the east and Sai Ap Chau in the west, with the islet of Ap Tan Pai (鴨蛋排) nearby in the northeast.

== Conservation ==
Ap Lo Chun is part of the Double Haven Special Area (印洲塘特別地區) that covers 0.8 hectare and was designated in 2011. The Special Area includes the islets Pak Ka Chau, Yan Chau (both within Double Haven) as well as the islet of Ap Lo Chun and a part of Ap Chau (both within Crooked Harbour). The geology of the area is characterised by sedimentary rocks of the Jurassic and Cretaceous periods.
