= Ngo Mei Chau =

Island of Hong Kong

Coordinates: 22.527854°N 114.316816°E

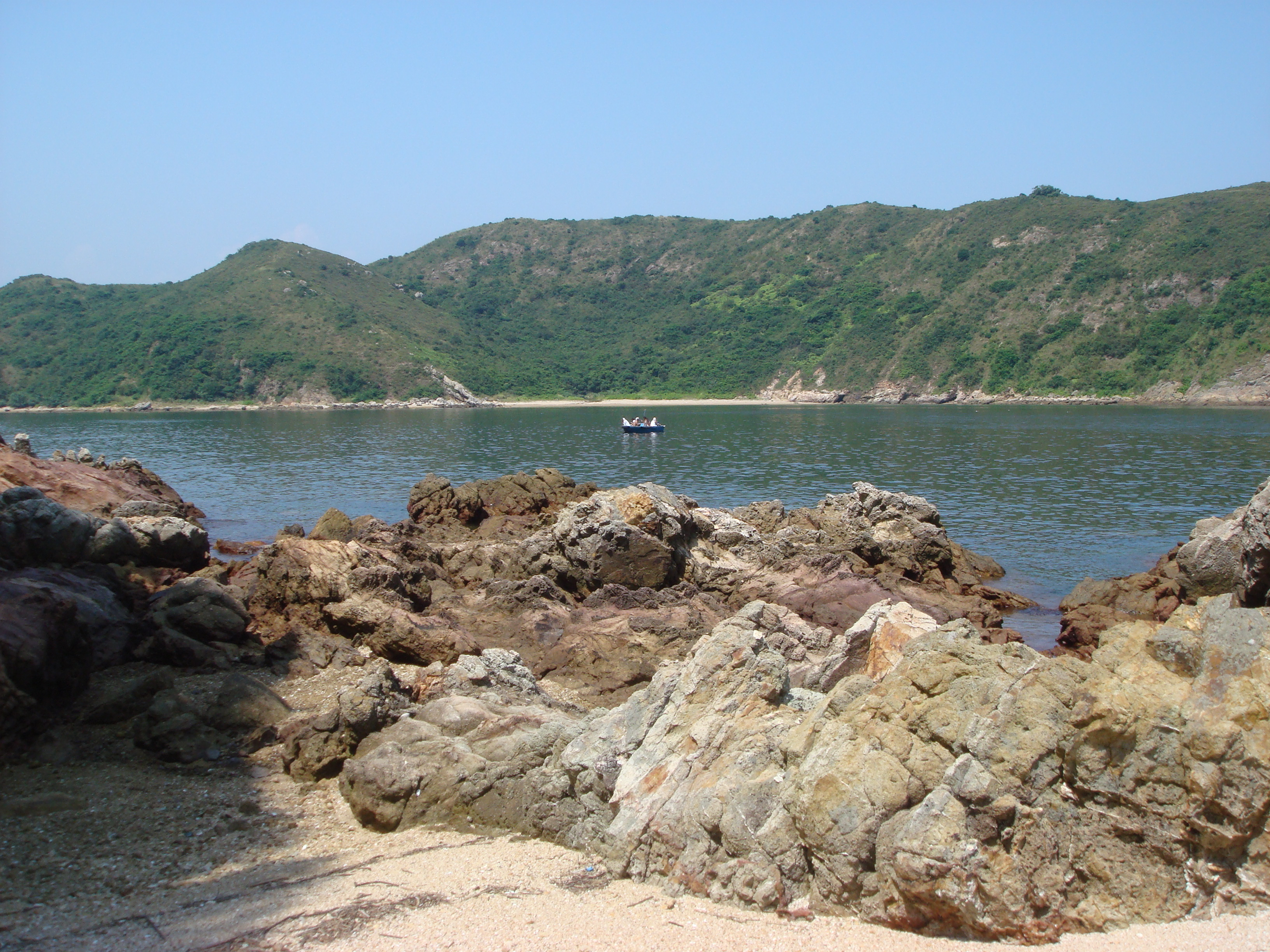
Ngo Mei Chau viewed from Double Island across Chik Mun Tau (直門頭) channel.

Crescent Island or Ngo Mei Chau (Chinese: 娥眉洲) is an island of Hong Kong, located southeast of Crooked Island (Kat O) and northeast of Double Island (Wong Wan Chau). Administratively, it is part of North District.

== Conservation ==
Crescent Island has been part of the Plover Cove (Extension) Country Park since 1979.

== See also ==
- Double Haven
- Mirs Bay
- Beaches of Hong Kong
