= Ap Tau Pai =

Island between Yan Chau Tong and Crooked Harbour in Hong Kong

Native name: 鴨兜排
- Location within Hong Kong

Geography
- Coordinates: 22.53583°N 114.27233°E

Administration
- Hong Kong
- Districts: North District

Demographics
- Population: 0

Ap Tau Pai (Chinese: 鴨兜排) is a small island between Yan Chau Tong and Crooked Harbour in the north-eastern New Territories of Hong Kong. It is located in Ap Chau Bay (鴨洲海), North-east of Hong Kong. It is under the administration of North District.

== See also ==
- Islands and peninsulas of Hong Kong
