= Pak Ka Chau =

Islet of Hong Kong

Coordinates: 22.532836°N 114.288457°E

Pak Ka Chau (Chinese: 筆架洲) is an islet of the North District of Hong Kong. It is located within Double Haven, south of Kat O.

== Conservation ==
Pak Ka Chau is part of the Double Haven Special Area (印洲塘特別地區) that covers 0.8 hectare and was designated in 2011. The Special Area includes the islets Pak Ka Chau, Yan Chau (both within Double Haven) as well as the islet of Ap Lo Chun and a part of Ap Chau (both within Crooked Harbour). The geology of the area is characterised by sedimentary rocks of the Jurassic and Cretaceous periods.
