= Tiu Tang Lung =

- 吊燈籠
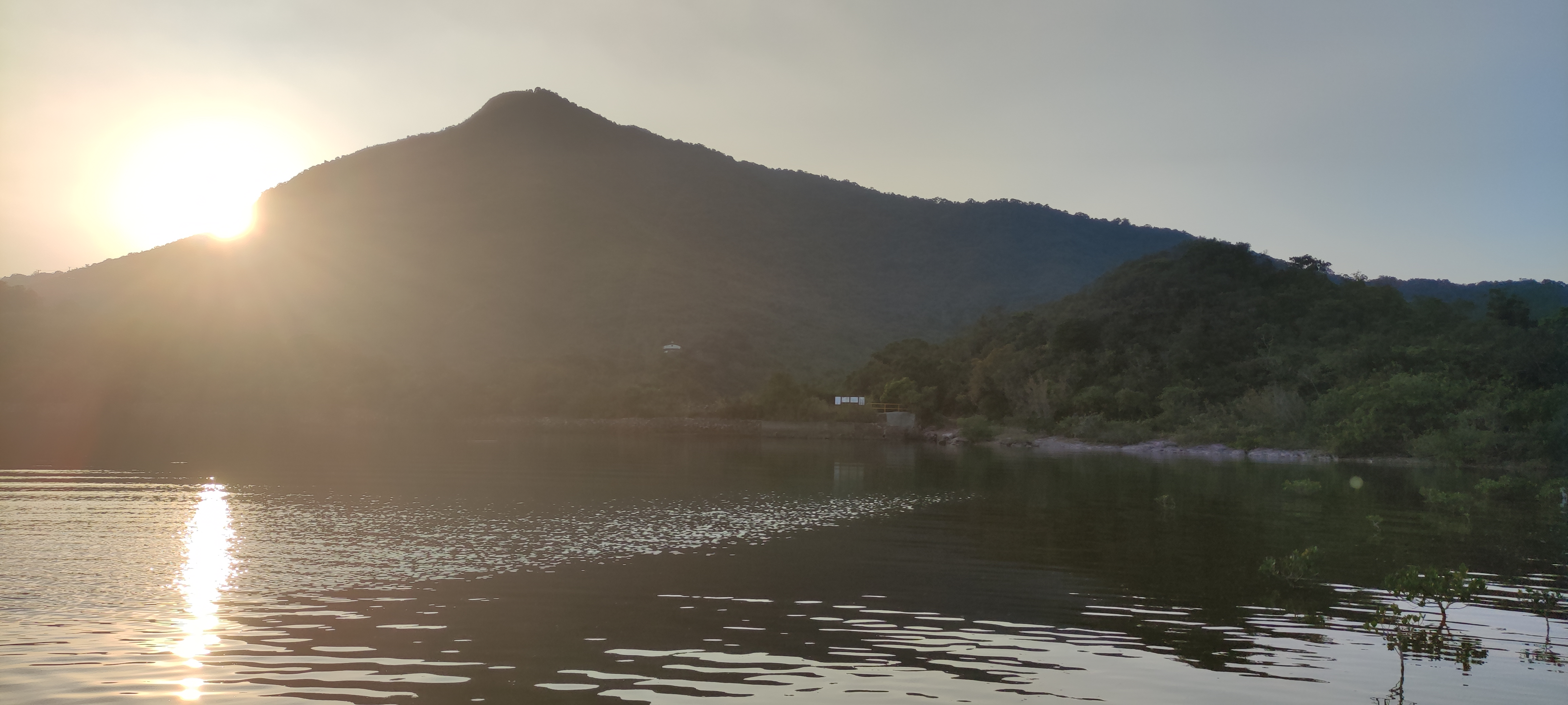
- Tiu Tang Lung from Double Haven

Highest point
- Elevation: 417 m (1,368 ft)
- Coordinates: 22°30′41″N 114°15′32″E

Geography
- Location within Hong Kong
- Location: Northeastern New Territories, Hong Kong

Tiu Tang Lung (Chinese: 吊燈籠) is a hill within Plover Cove Country Park in northeastern Hong Kong. It has a height of 417 metres (1,368 ft). The hill is reasonably hard for hikers and should only be attempted in good weather with correct equipment.

== See also ==
- List of mountains, peaks and hills in Hong Kong
