= Ap Chau =

Island in the Crooked Harbour of Hong Kong

Native name: 鴨洲
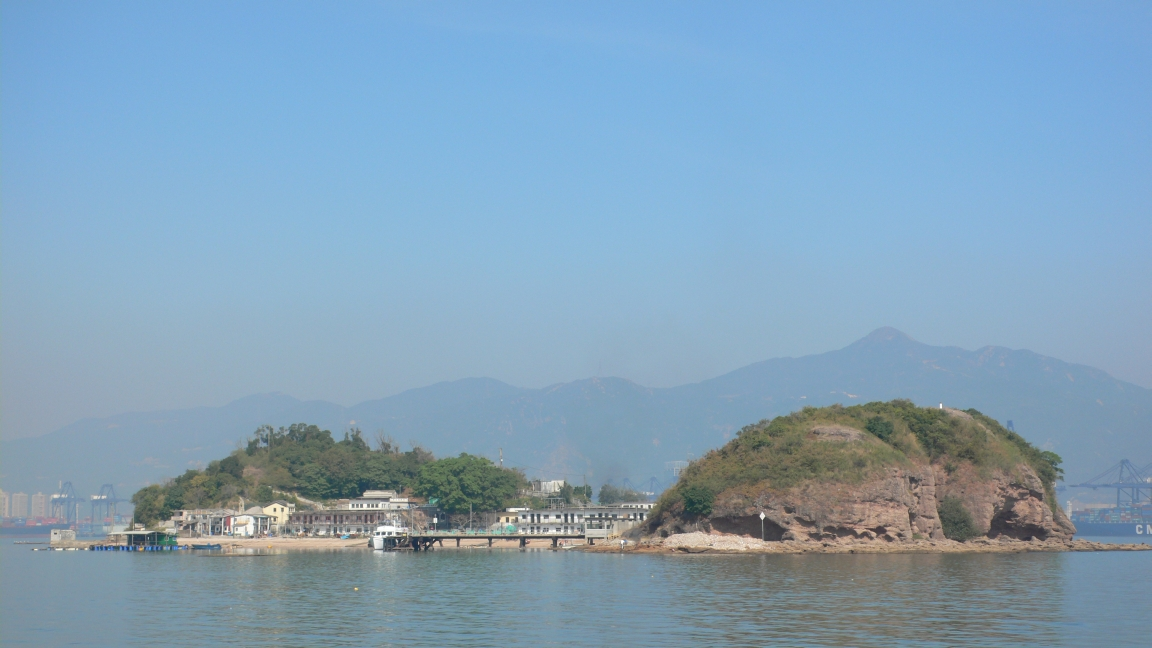
- Ap Chau viewed from the West

- Location within Hong Kong

Geography
- Coordinates: 22°33′04.5″N 114°16′10″E
- Area: 0.04 km^{2} (0.015 sq mi)

Administration
- Hong Kong
- Districts: North District

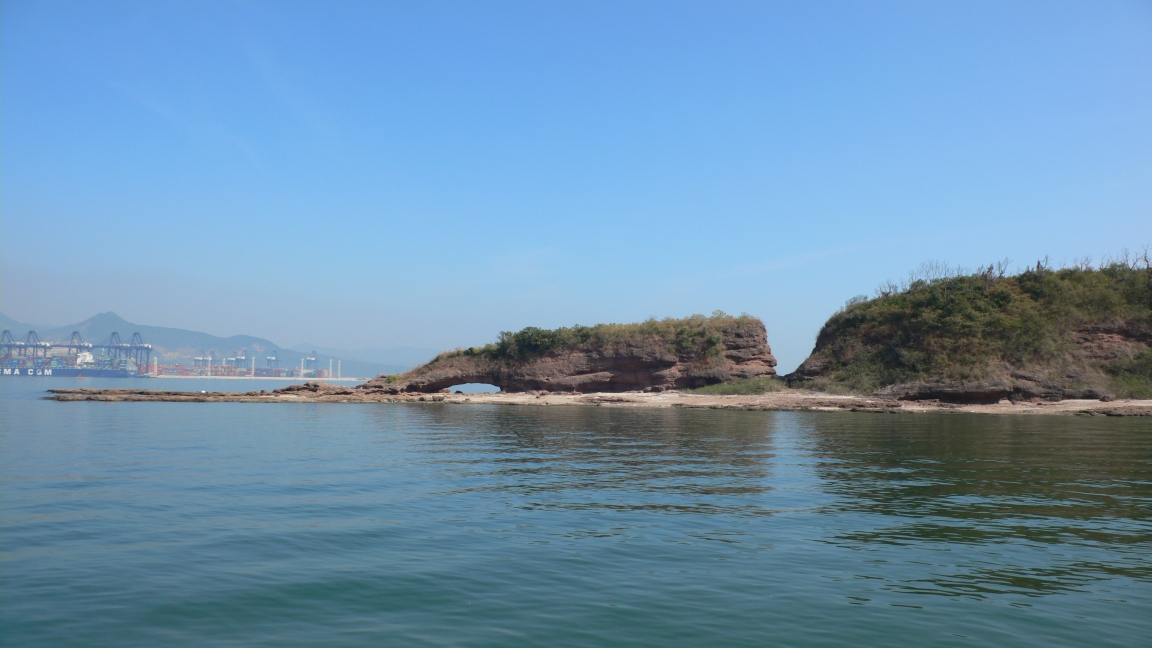
The "Duck Head" Ap Chau is part of the Double Haven Special Area.

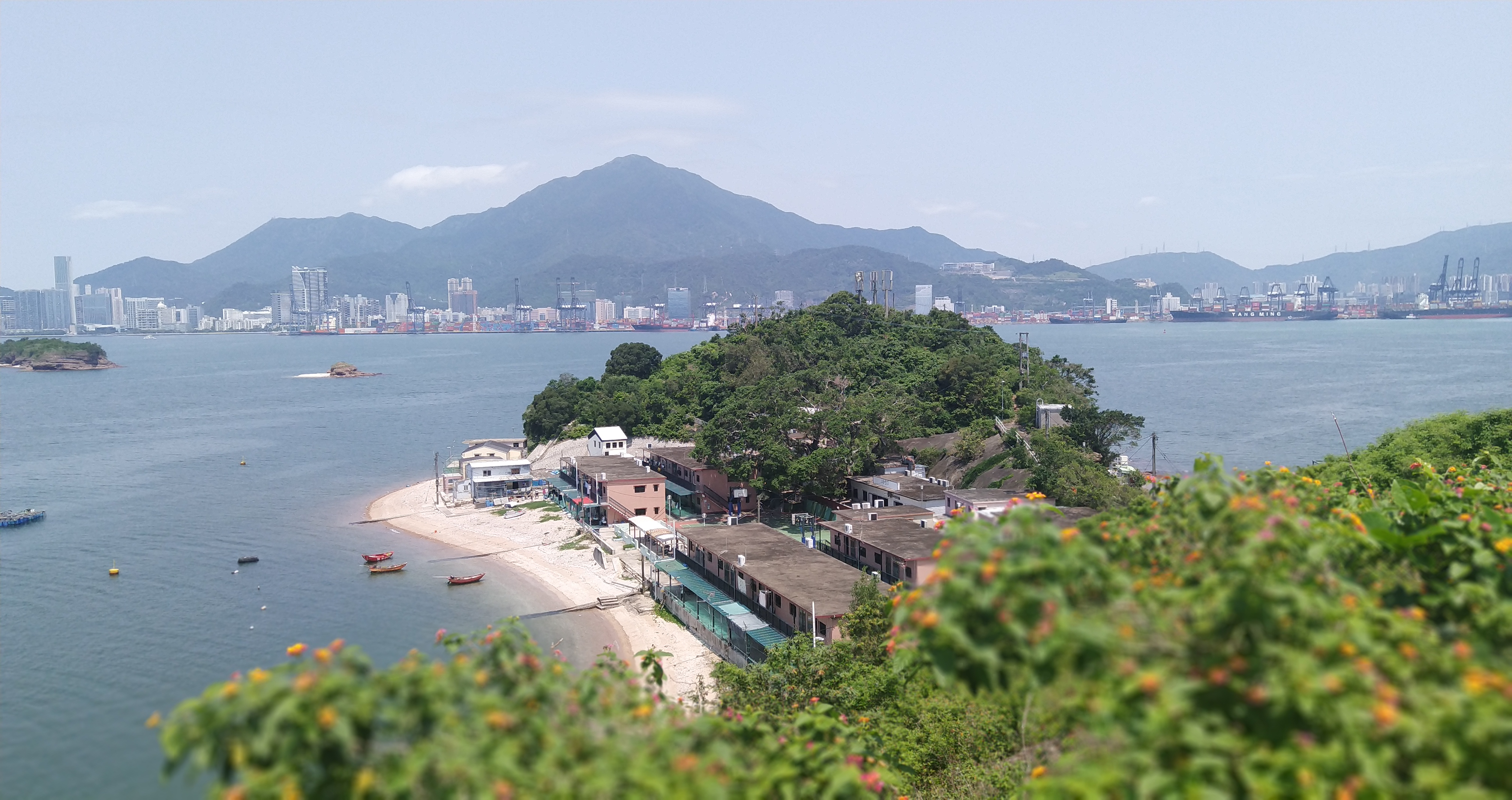
Ap Chau.

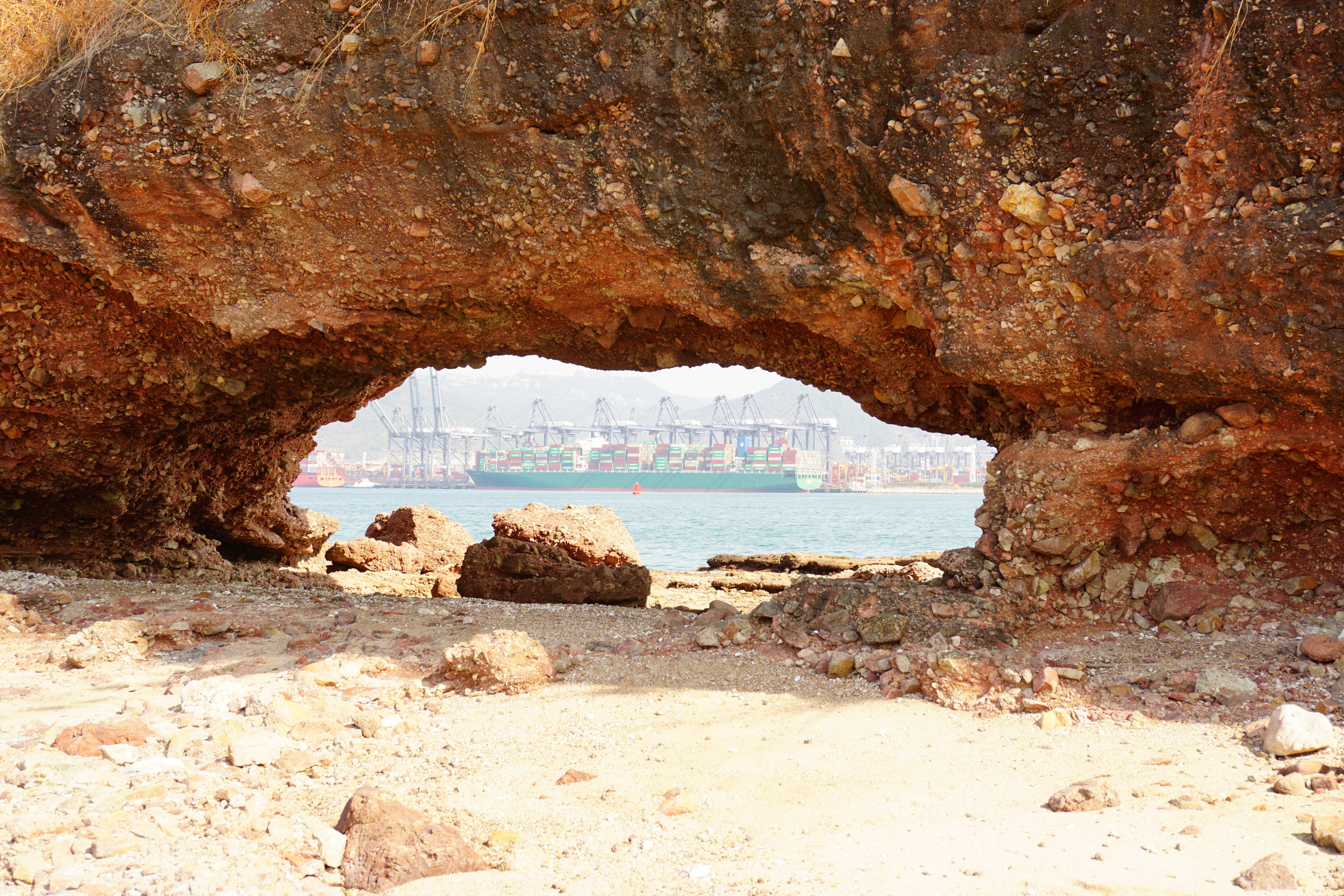
The Duck's Eye Sea Arch

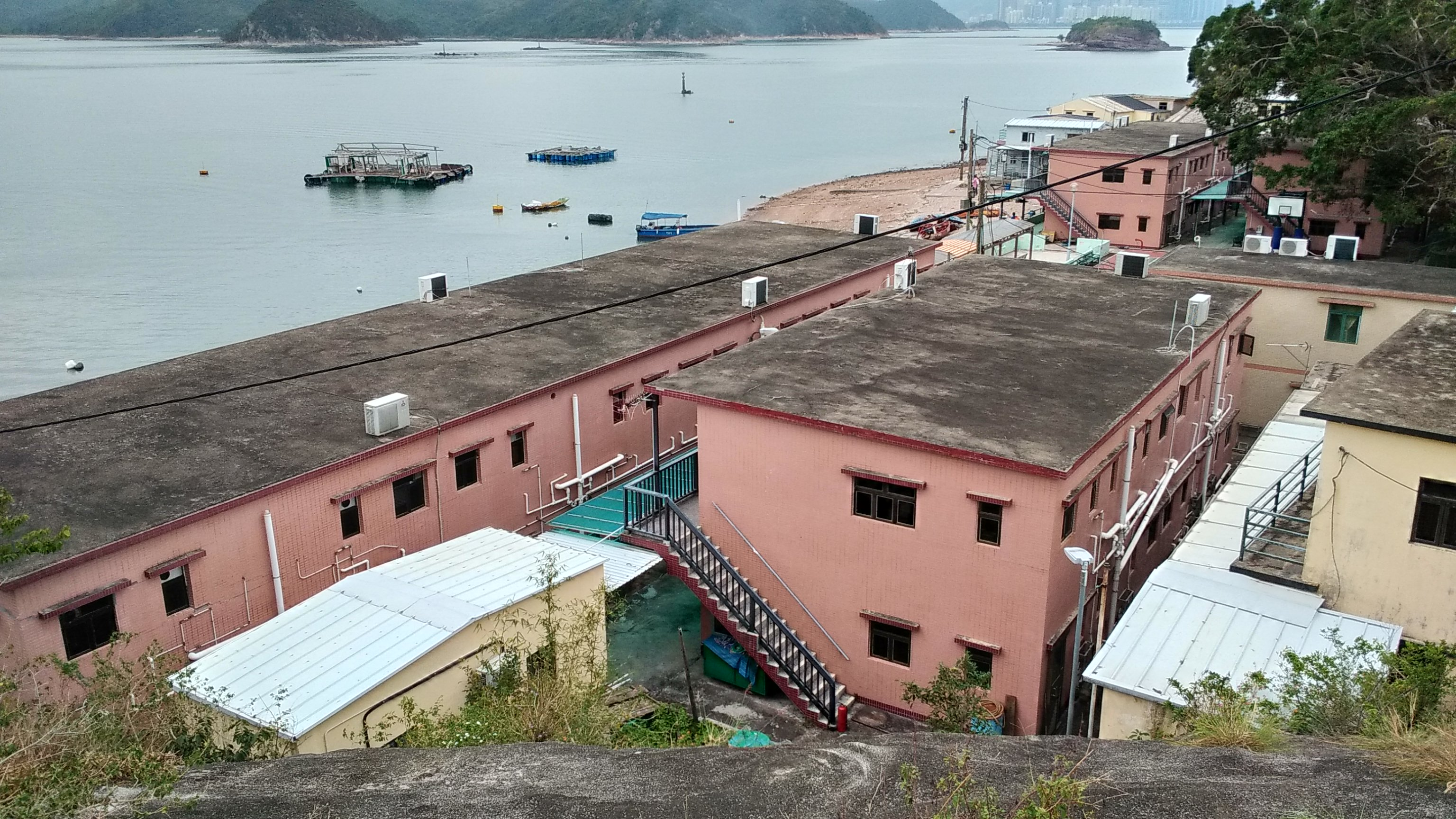
Ap Chau Fishermen's Village.

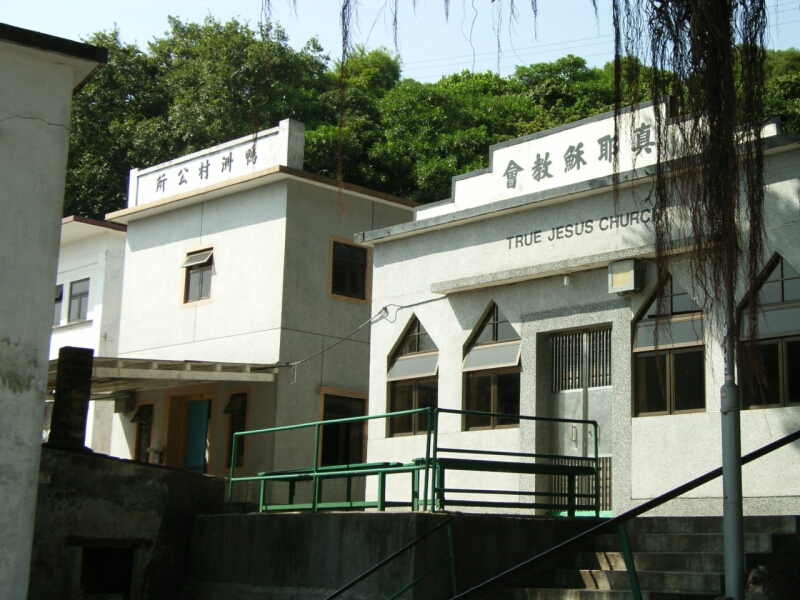
Village office and church building in Ap Chau.

Ap Chau (Chinese: 鴨洲; lit. 'duck island'), also known as Robinson Island, with a size of 0.04 km² is an island in the Crooked Harbour, in the north-eastern New Territories of Hong Kong. It is located in Ap Chau Bay (鴨洲海; Ap Chau Hoi). Islets located close by include Ap Chau Pak Tun Pai, Ap Chau Mei Pak Tun Pai, Ap Lo Chun, Ap Tan Pai and Kau Tau Shek. Ap Chau is considered as the smallest inhabited island in Hong Kong.

== Name ==
Robinson Island was named after Hercules Robinson, 1st Baron Rosmead, who was the 5th Governor of Hong Kong from 1859 to 1865.

== Administration ==
Ap Chau is under the administration of North District. It is a recognized village under the New Territories Small House Policy.

== History ==
Until the early 20th century, Ap Chau had been an uninhabited island. In the 1920s, Tanka fishermen, an originally non-Chinese ethnic minority, came from various places to anchor their boats to the island, using the land for drying nets and boat repairs.

In the 1940s, some fishermen started to settle permanently on Ap Chau by building informal settlements.

Due to the shift in power in mainland China in 1949, The True Jesus Church moved their operations to Sha Tau Kok, and eventually to Ap Chau by constructing a wooden church in 1952. Since the church was constructed, converted fishermen moved from their boats to reside on the island to gather for prayer. The church was replaced by a concrete church in 1965.

After receiving financial aid from the United States CARE program, a fresh water supply was installed in 1960. Water was sourced from a newly constructed reservoir in So Lo Pun using underground pipes. The pipes were constructed by Ap Chau locals, with assistance from the British Military.

Ap Chau Fishermen village (Chinese: 鴨洲漁民村) the official village on the island, was constructed in 1961. Set up by local fishermen and their families, It was financially aided by the United States CARE program, and the British Government.

The single primary school on the island "FMO Ap Chau Primary School" opened in 1958.

At its peak Ap Chau had over 700 inhabitants, but during the 1960s-1970s most have moved over to cities in the United Kingdom such as Newcastle upon Tyne, Leicester, Sunderland, Elgin and Edinburgh.

Being so close to mainland China, before the transfer of sovereignty of Hong Kong the island was a magnet for illegal immigrant swimmers, one reason being that the well lit public lavatory block was something of a beacon at night. The church on the island is still active. The island has 3 permanent residents as of October 2017.

== Features ==
To promote tourism, in April 2018 the Ap Chau Story Room opened for public visits on Sundays and public holidays. The Story Room was repurposed from the site of the abandoned FMO Ap Chau Primary School by the Government.

The Duck's Eye Sea Arch (Chinese: 鴨眼 - also called Ap Chau Sea Arch), located on the northern end of the island, is a 2m tall and 10m wide natural arch formed by concentrated seawater erosion. It is the only sea arch in Hong Kong that is safe to walk through as stands above sea level, and is a popular sightseeing destination.

Fresh water in Ap Chau is obtained from mainland China using an underground pipe.

== Conservation ==
The northern part of Ap Chau is part of the Double Haven Special Area (印洲塘特別地區) that covers 0.8 hectare and was designated in 2011. The Special Area includes the islets Pak Ka Chau, Yan Chau (both within Double Haven) as well as the islet of Ap Lo Chun and a part of Ap Chau (both within Crooked Harbour). The geology of the area is characterised by sedimentary rocks of the Jurassic and Cretaceous periods.

== Transport ==
Kut O Village Rural Committee (Tung Lok House) Limited operates a daily kaito service to both Ap Chau and Kat O from Sha Tau Kok. But since the Sha Tau Kok Public Pier is in a restricted area, only restricted area pass holders are permitted to access the pier and take the kaito.

Best Sonic Industrial Limited operates kaito services to Ap Chau and Kat O from Ma Liu Shui pier on weekends and public holidays from 2018.

== See also ==
- Islands of Hong Kong
- Outlying Islands
- Fishermen villages in Hong Kong
