= Ap Tan Pai =

Reef in the New Territories of Hong Kong

Native name: 鴨蛋排
- Location within Hong Kong

Geography
- Coordinates: 22.55311°N 114.26550°E

Administration
- Hong Kong
- Districts: North District

Ap Tan Pai (Chinese: 鴨蛋排) is a reef in the New Territories of Hong Kong. It is located in Ap Chau Bay (鴨洲海; Ap Chau Hoi) of Crooked Harbour, between Ap Chau (鴨洲) to the east and Ap Lo Chun (鴨籮春) to the southwest. It is under the administration of North District.
