= Kat O =

Island in north-east Hong Kong

Coordinates: 22°32′28″N 114°17′43.9″E

吉澳
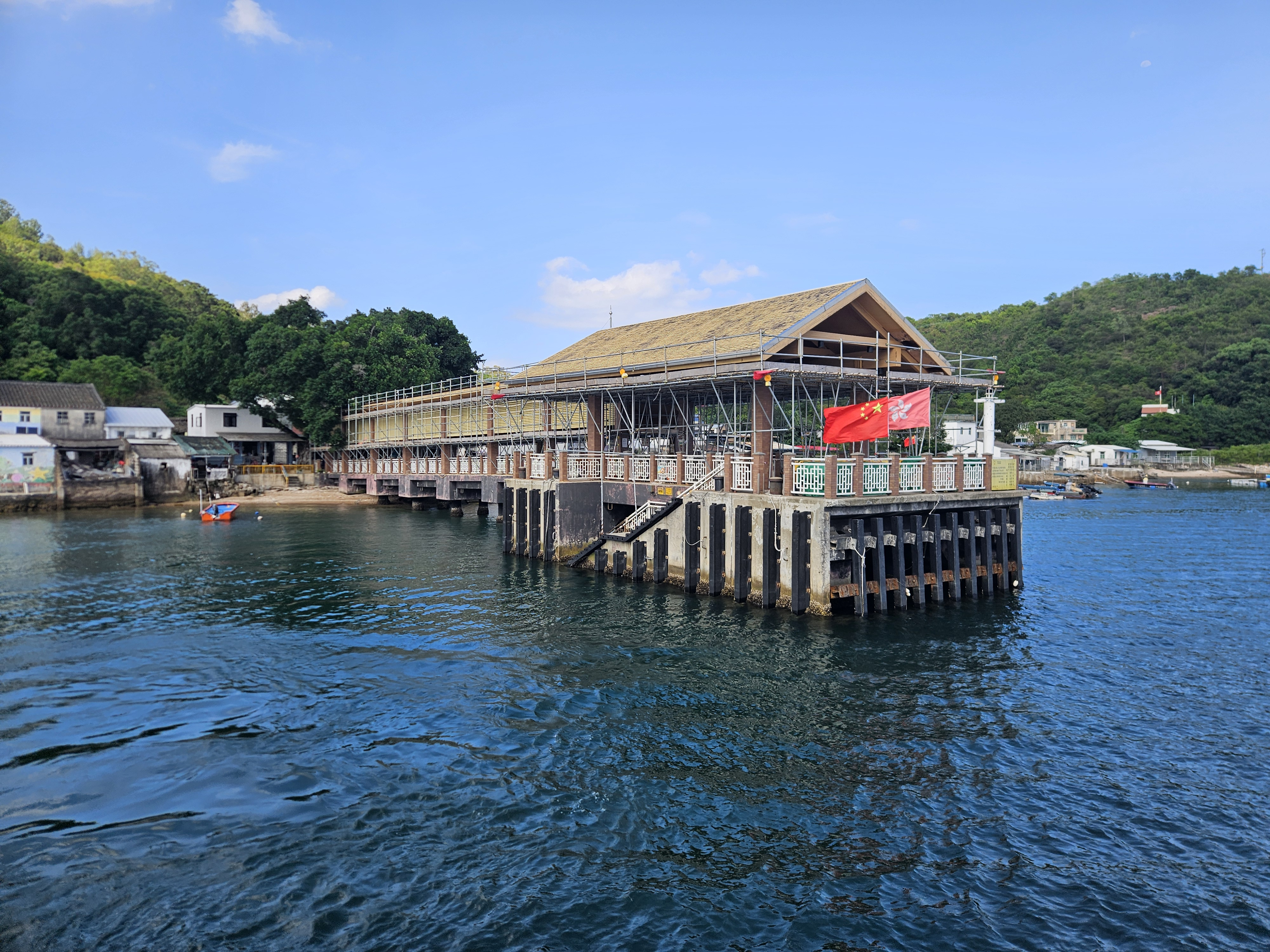
- The pier of Kat O

- Location of Kat O in Hong Kong

Geography
- Location: North District
- Area: 2.35 km^{2} (0.91 sq mi)
- Highest elevation: 122 m (400 ft)
- Highest point: Kai Kung Leng (雞公嶺)

Administration
- Hong Kong

Kat O
- Traditional Chinese: 吉澳
- Literal meaning: Crooked Island
Transcriptions
Hakka
- Romanization: Ket au
Yue: Cantonese
- Yale Romanization: Gāt ou
- Jyutping: Gat^{1} ou^{3}

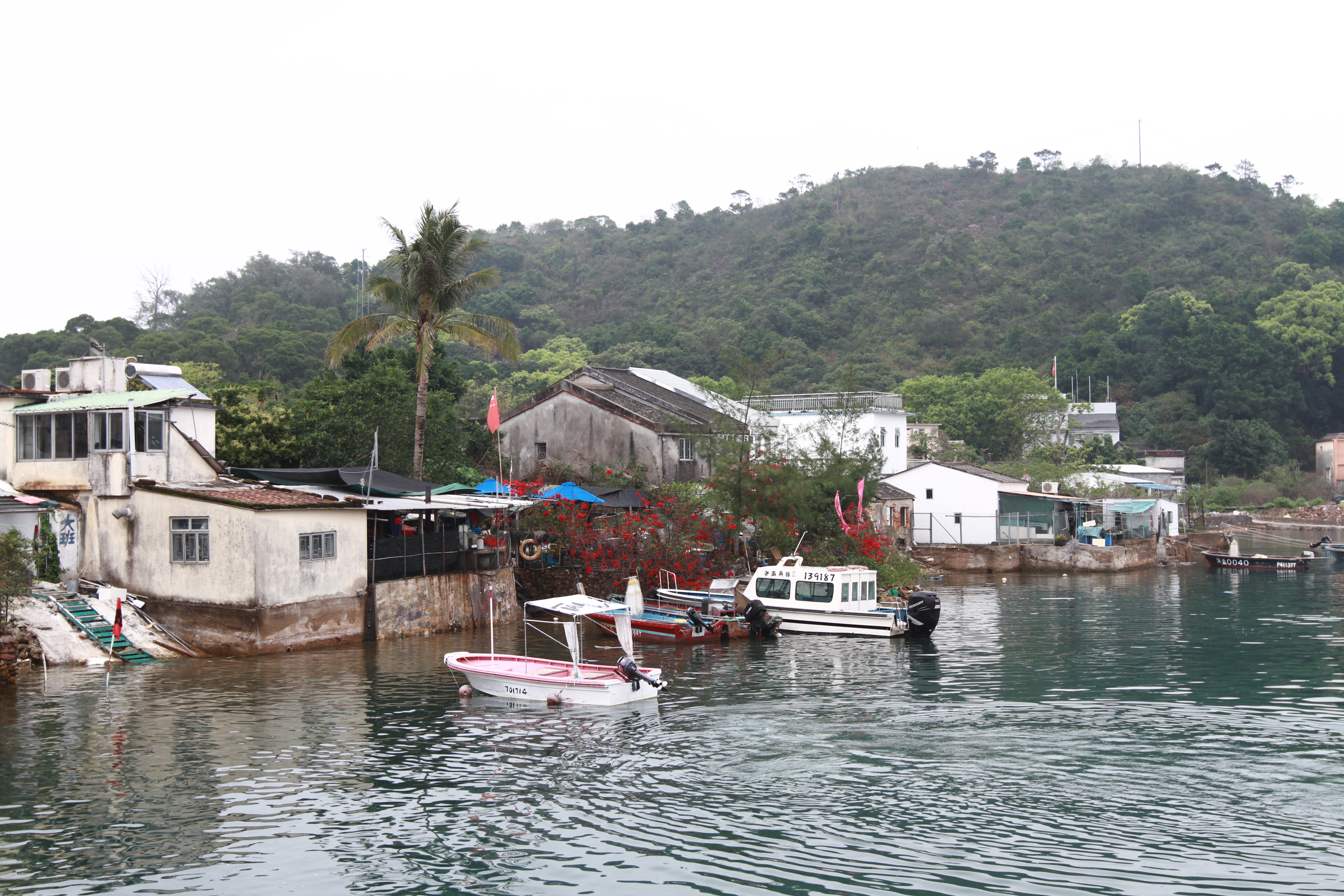
Village houses near the coast

Kat O (Chinese: 吉澳), also named Crooked Island, is an island in northeast Hong Kong.

== Administration ==
Administratively, Kat O is part of North District. It is a recognized village under the New Territories Small House Policy.

== Geography ==
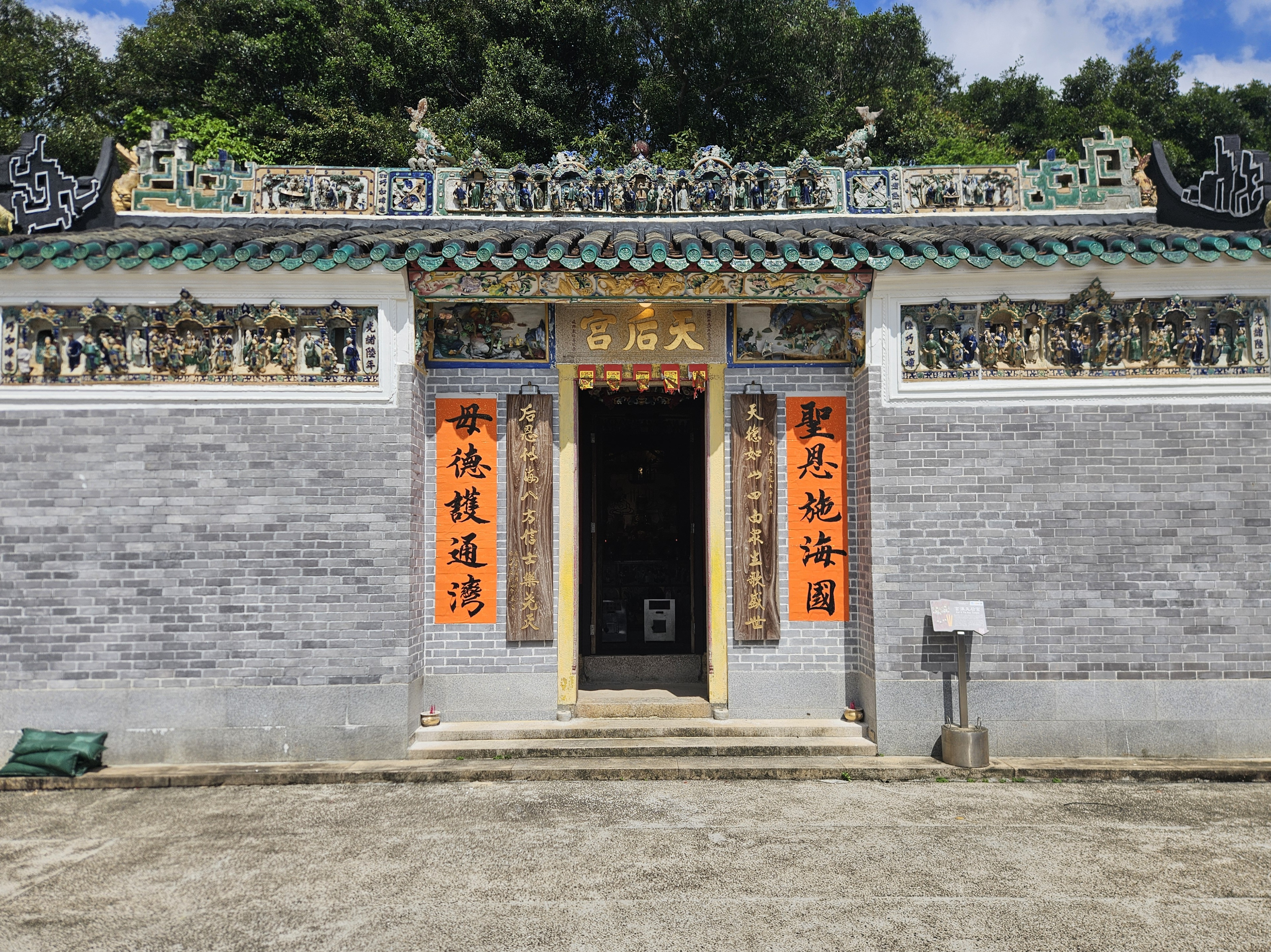
Tin Hau Temple on Kat O

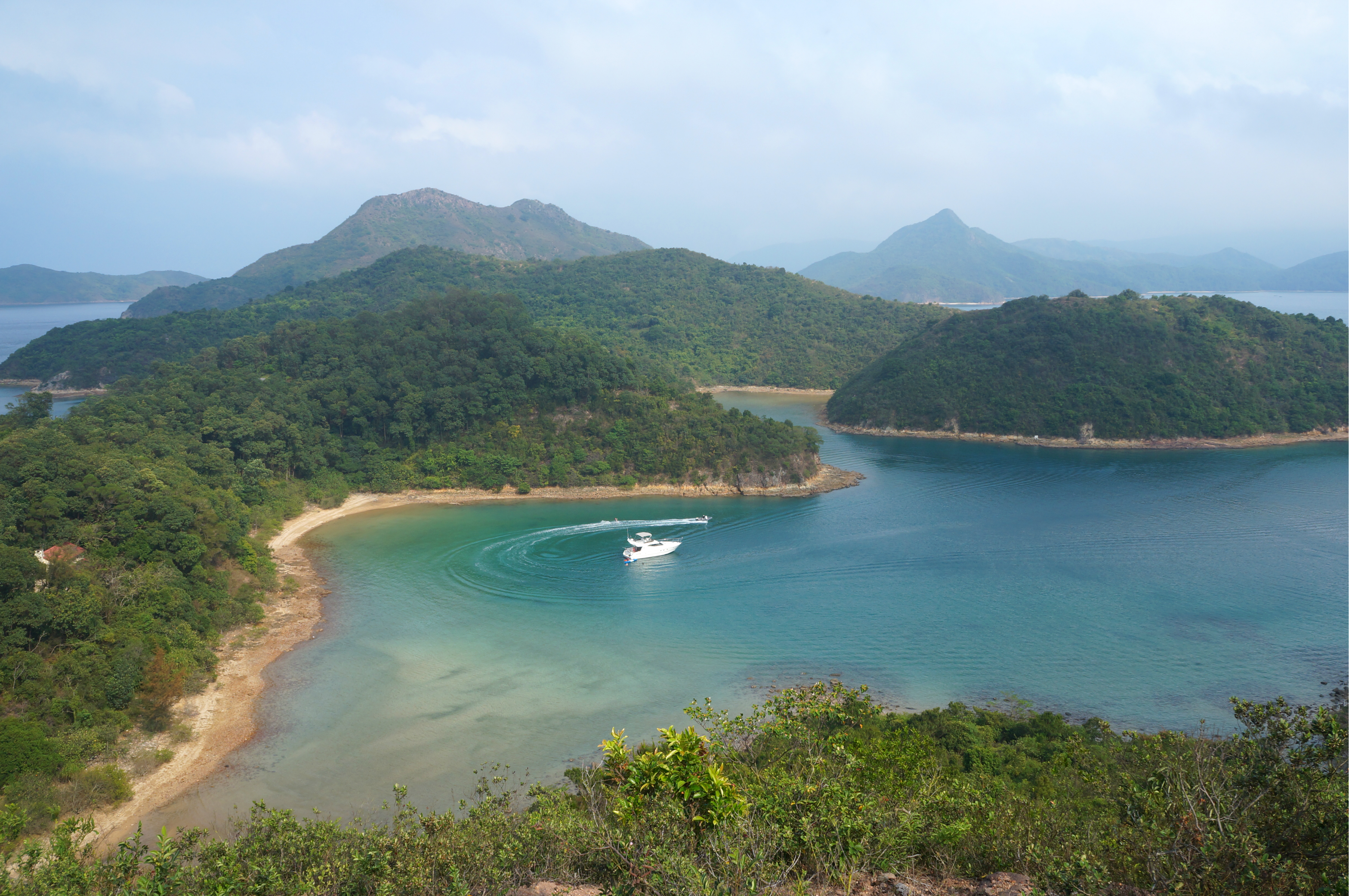
Camp Cove (白沙頭灣) in the southern part of Kat O

Kat O is located in the west of Mirs Bay. With an area of 2.35 km², it is the largest island in North District, the second largest being Wong Wan Chau (Double Island). Neighbouring islands include Ap Chau, Ngo Mei Chau (Crescent Island), and Pak Sha Chau (Round Island). The village of Tung O (東澳) is located on its northwest coast. Its highest point is Kai Kung Leng (雞公嶺), which is 122 m above sea level.

O Pui Tong (澳背塘) is a bay surrounded by the crook-shaped Crooked Island and Yeung Chau. O Pui Tong, together with the northwestern waters of Kat O, are two of the 26 designated marine fish culture zones in Hong Kong.

== History ==
Kat O was once a major fishing market in Hong Kong, and long served as an important stopover for boats travelling between Hong Kong and the rest of China.

During the Ming dynasty, a decree required all inhabitants to leave the island. Then in the 1660s, soon after the end of the dynasty, it was re-settled by Hakka people. Other residents were Tanka fishermen.

== Features ==
The Tin Hau Temple at Kat O is estimated to be built in 1763. It is listed as a Grade III historic building. Part of the temple building was used for the Tat O School until the school was moved to a new location in 1957. A Pak Kung Shrine is also located in the vicinity.

The island is home to three cannons. These are thought to have been made in the west, during the 19th century.

== Conservation ==
Kat O has been part of the Plover Cove (Extension) Country Park since 1979.

The Kat O Nature Trail is 1 km long, stretching from the Kat O Ferry Pier to Ko Tei Teng (高地頂).

The Kat O Geoheritage Centre (at No. 142 Kat O Main Street) was opened in 2010 by Kat O villagers, volunteer groups and the government to raise public awareness of geo-conservation, as part of the Hong Kong Geopark.

== See also ==
- Crooked Harbour
- Double Haven
- Pat Sin Leng Country Park
