= Crooked Harbour =

Natural harbour in Hong Kong

Coordinates: 22°32′32.36″N 114°16′41.12″E

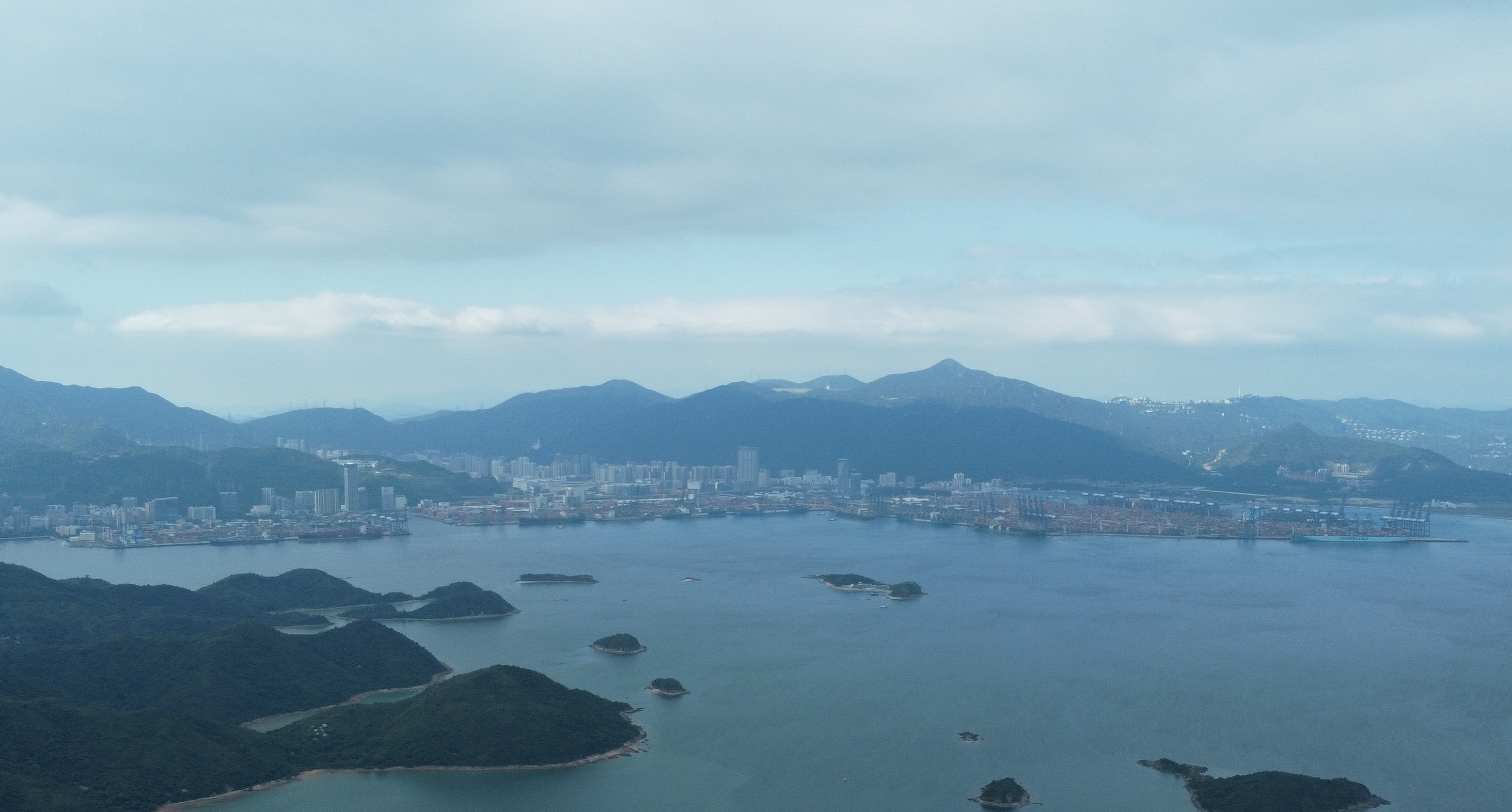
Northwestern part of Crooked Harbour with Yantian International Container Terminals of Shenzhen in the background.

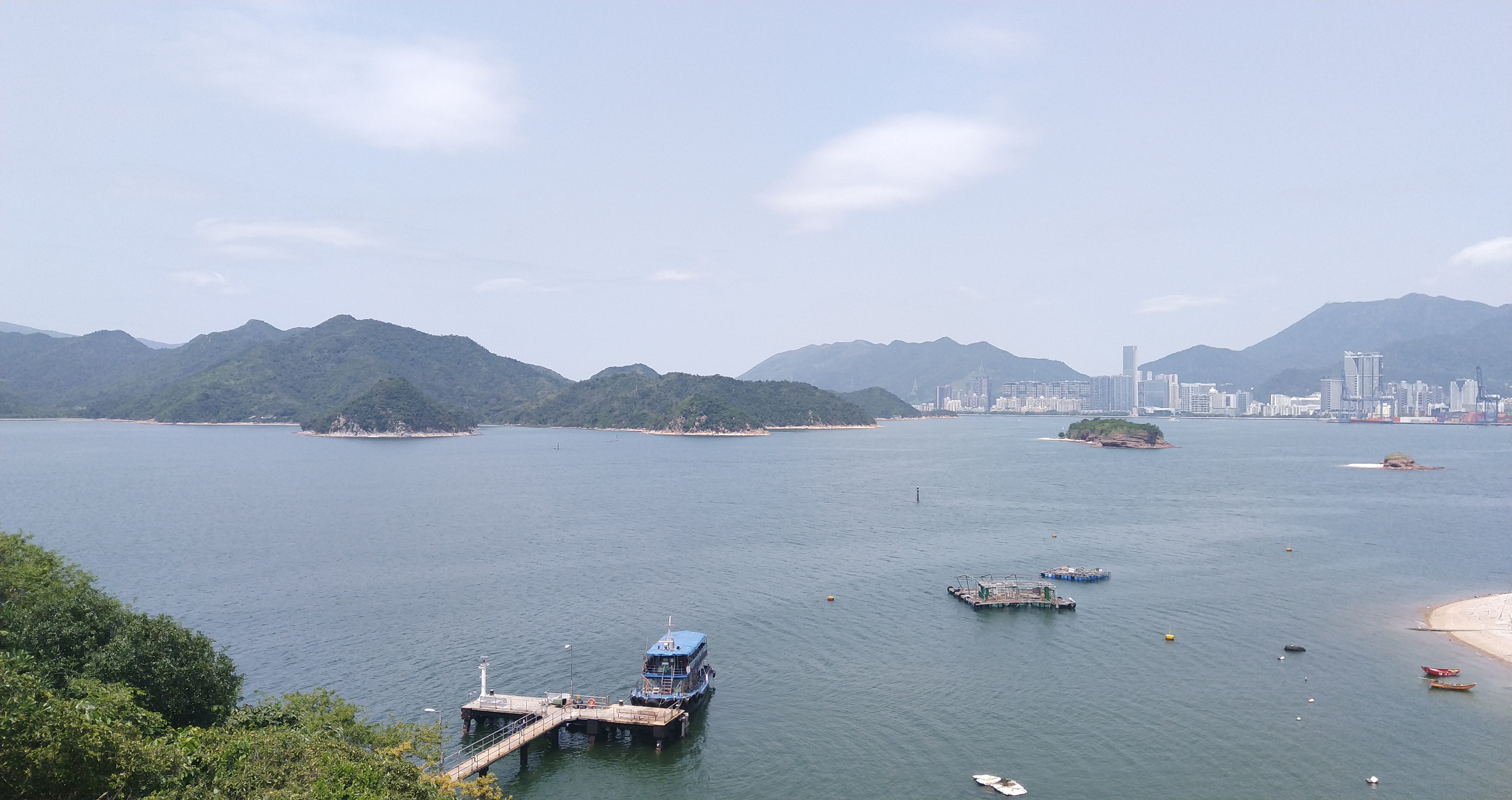
Northern part of Crooked Harbour, viewed from Ap Chau toward the Hong Kong mainland. The Shenzhen skyline is visible on the right.

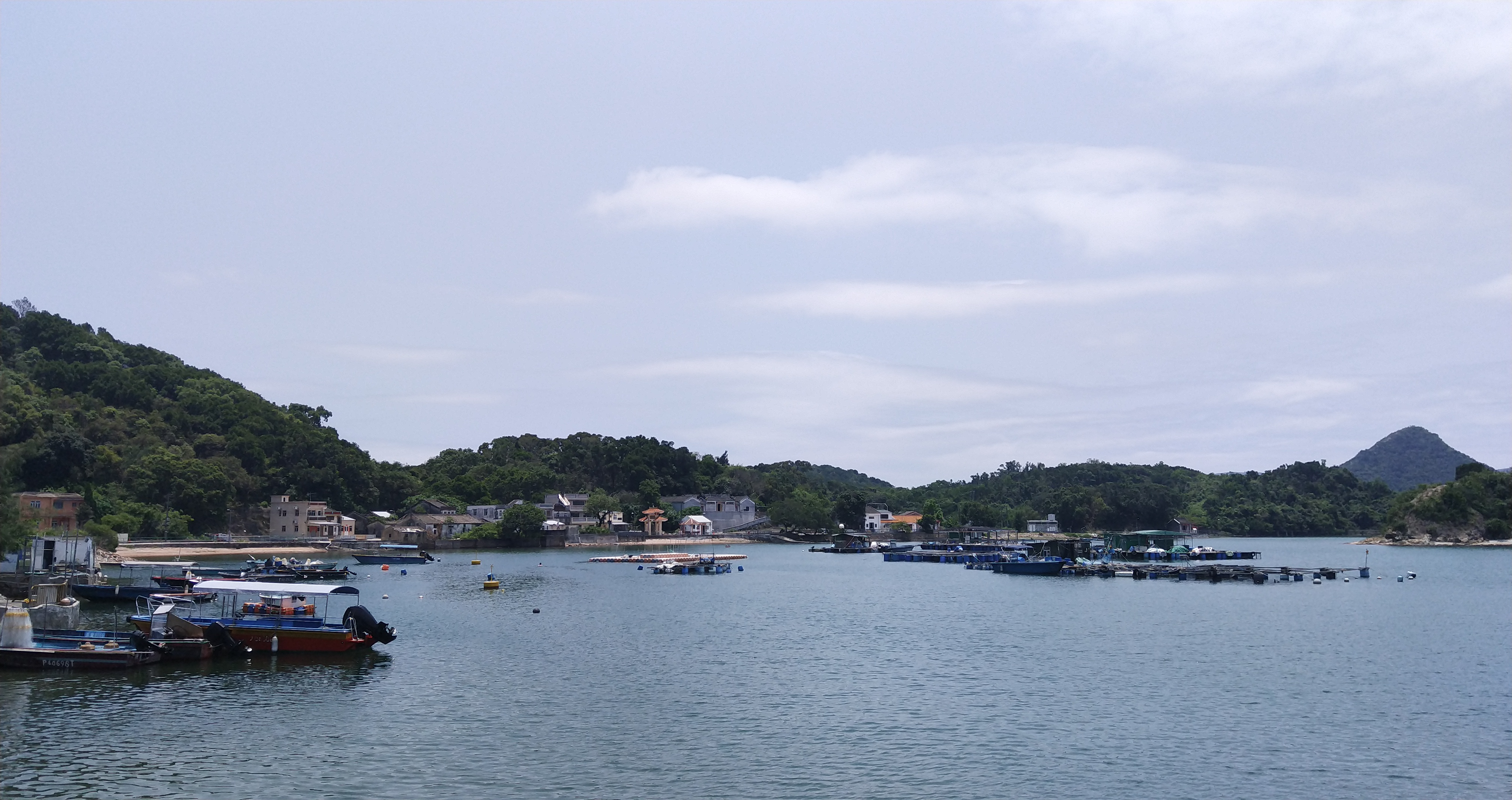
Western coast of Kat O, facing Crooked Harbour.

Crooked Harbour or Kat O Hoi (Chinese: 吉澳海) is a harbour at the northeast of New Territories, Hong Kong. The harbour is connected to Double Haven and the bigger sea of Mirs Bay. Crooked Island, also known as Kat O, and several islands, including Ap Chau, form the harbour with the mainland New Territories.

== Islands ==
Islands of Crooked Harbour include:

- Ap Chau
- Ap Chau Mei Pak Tun Pai
- Ap Chau Pak Tun Pai
- Ap Lo Chun
- Ap Tan Pai
- Ap Tau Pai
- Cheung Shek Tsui
- Fun Chau
- Kat O
- Lo Chi Pai
- Sai Ap Chau
- Siu Nim Chau
- Tai Nim Chau

== Ecology ==
Wave-cut "benches" of 6 to 10 meters wide form along the sediment layers at Crooked Harbor and Ping Chau, which are uncommon elsewhere in Hong Kong's coastline.

Eelgrasses discovered at Lai Chi Wo in 1977 were granted protection by the Agricultural and Fisheries Department of the Hong Kong government. Periclimenes demani, a small species of shrimp, resides in this grass.

== Historical event ==
On 8 June 1857, a British naval frigate encountered pirates at Crooked Harbor, 70 men leapt overboard and were massacred on land.
