= Ap Chau Pak Tun Pai =

Island in Hong Kong

Native name: Chinese: 鴨洲白墩排
- Location within Hong Kong

Geography
- Location: Ap Chau Bay, Hong Kong
- Coordinates: 22.547682°N 114.272190°E

Administration
- China

Demographics
- Population: None

Additional information
- Time zone: HKT (UTC+8:00)

Ap Chau Pak Tun Pai (Chinese: 鴨洲白墩排) is a small island in the New Territories of Hong Kong. It is located in Ap Chau Bay (鴨洲海) to the west of Ap Chau and is not to be confused with Ap Chau Mei Pak Tun Pai which is located closer to Ap Chau. It is under the administration of North District.
