= Double Haven =

Harbour within the New Territories of Hong Kong

Coordinates: 22°31′21″N 114°17′49″E

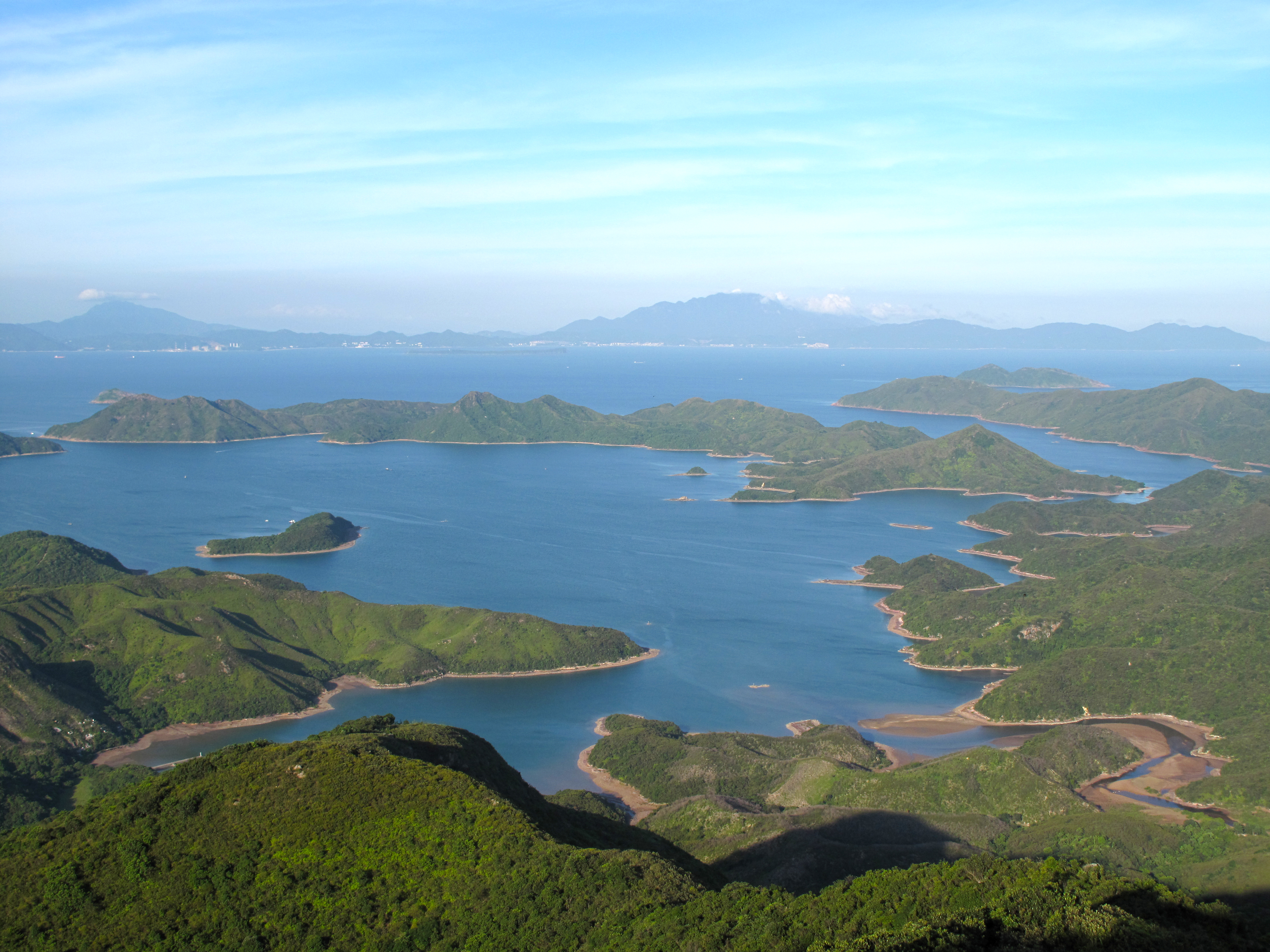
Double Haven viewed from Tiu Tang Lung

Double Haven or Yan Chau Tong (Chinese: 印洲塘) is a harbour enclosed by Double Island, Crescent Island and Crooked Island within the north-eastern New Territories of Hong Kong. It is known for its scenery and natural environment, and for the calm seas from which its English name derives. Double Haven contains many deep red coloured rocks because of iron oxide.

== Villages in Double Haven ==
- Lai Chi Wo (荔枝窩)
- Sam A Tsuen (三椏村)
- Kat O (吉澳)

== Islands ==
Islands within Double Haven include:

- Chap Mo Chau
- Double Island (Wong Wan Chau)
- Fu Wong Chau
- Kat O (Crooked Island)
- Ngo Mei Chau (Crescent Island)
- Pak Ka Chau
- Yan Chau

== Conservation ==
Parts of the haven fall within Yan Chau Tong Marine Park (印洲塘海岸公園) to protect the wildlife of the marine creatures.

Plover Cove (Extension) Country Park was designated in 1979 to protect the ecology of Double Haven. It also forms a major part of Hong Kong Global Geopark, Northeast New Territories Sedimentary Rock Region.The two main ecological features of this area are mangroves and seagrass beds, which are a nursery for marine life.

The Double Haven Special Area (印洲塘特別地區) covers 0.8 hectare and was designated in 2011. It includes the islets Pak Ka Chau, Yan Chau (both within Double Haven) as well as the islet of Ap Lo Chun and a part of Ap Chau (both within Crooked Harbour). The geology of the area is characterised by sedimentary rocks of the Jurassic and Cretaceous periods.

== Transportation ==
- A ferry service runs between Ma Liu Shui Ferry Pier, which sails across Double Haven on Sunday and public holidays.
- A hiking route from Wu Kau Tang to Lai Chi Wo overlooks Double Haven.

== See also ==
- Hong Kong Global Geopark
- Plover Cove (Extension) Country Park
- Crooked Harbour
