= Ap Chau Mei Pak Tun Pai =

Island in Hong Kong

Native name: Chinese: 鴨洲尾白墩排
- Location within Hong Kong

Geography
- Location: Ap Chau Bay, Hong Kong
- Coordinates: 22°32′58.46″N 114°16′7.06″E

Administration
- China

Demographics
- Population: None

Additional information
- Time zone: HKT (UTC+8:00)

Ap Chau Mei Pak Tun Pai (Chinese: 鴨洲尾白墩排) is a small island in the New Territories of Hong Kong. It is located in Ap Chau Bay (鴨洲海) just off the southern tip of Ap Chau (鴨洲) and is not to be confused with Ap Chau Pak Tun Pai (鴨洲白墩排) which is located further west. It is under the administration of North District.
