= Conservation in Hong Kong =

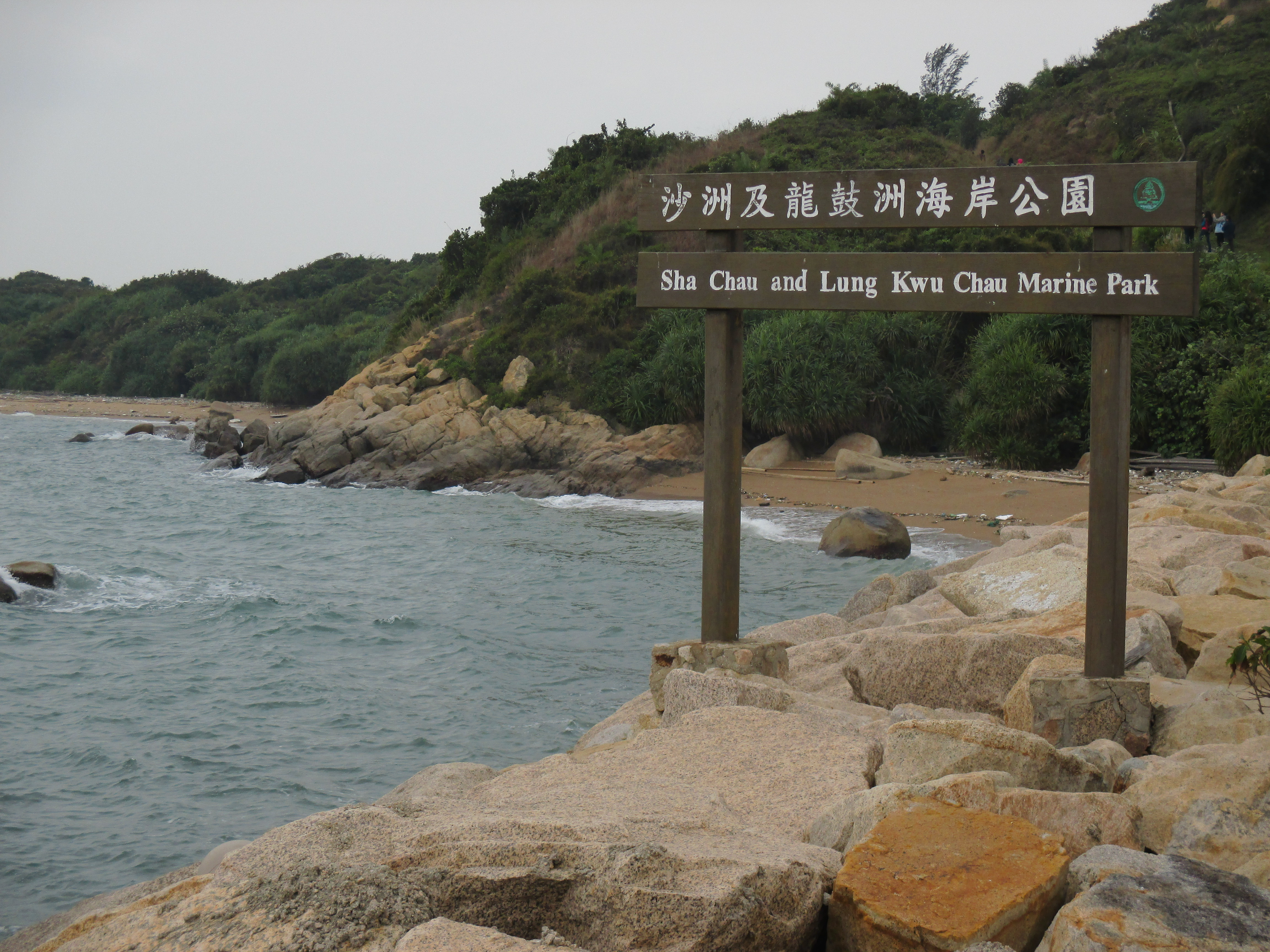
Sha Chau and Lung Kwu Chau Marine Park

Out of the total 1,114 km^{2} of land in Hong Kong, three-quarters is countryside, with various landscapes including beaches, woodlands, and mountain ranges being found within the small territory. Most of Hong Kong's parks have abundant natural diversity, usually containing over 1,000 species of plants.

== Country parks ==
To conserve and, where appropriate, open up the countryside for the greater enjoyment of the population, the Country Parks Ordinance was enacted in 1976 to provide a legal framework for the designation, development, and management of Country Parks and Special Areas. It provides for establishing a Country and Marine Parks Board to advise the Director of Agriculture, Fisheries, and Conservation, who, like the Country and Marine Parks Authority, is responsible for all matters on Country Parks and Special Areas.

A total of 25 country parks have been designated. The country parks and special areas cover a total area of 440 km^{2}. Country Parks are designated for the purposes of nature conservation, countryside recreation, and outdoor education. The country parks comprise scenic hills, woodlands, reservoirs, and coastlines in all parts of Hong Kong.

Number	Name	Established	Area (square kilometres)	District
1	Shing Mun	24 June 1977	14.00	New Territories Central Part
3	Lion Rock	24 June 1977	5.57	New Territories Central Part
2	Kam Shan	24 June 1977 (modified 30 December 2013)	3.39	New Territories Central Part
4	Aberdeen	28 October 1977	4.23	Hong Kong Island Western Part
5	Tai Tam	28 October 1977	13.15	Hong Kong Island Eastern Part
6	Sai Kung East	3 February 1978 (modified 30 December 2013)	44.94	New Territories Eastern Part
7	Sai Kung West	3 February 1978	30.00	New Territories Eastern Part
8	Plover Cove	7 April 1978	45.94	New Territories North-eastern Part
9	Lantau South	20 April 1978	56.40	Lantau Island Southern part
10	Lantau North	18 August 1978	22.00	Lantau Island Northern part
11	Pat Sin Leng	8 August 1978	31.25	New Territories North-eastern Part
12	Tai Lam	23 February 1979 (modified 7 April 1995 and 30 December 2013)	54.12	New Territories Western Part
13	Tai Mo Shan	23 February 1979	14.40	New Territories Central Part
14	Lam Tsuen	23 February 1979	15.20	New Territories North-western Part
15	Ma On Shan	27 April 1979 (modified 18 December 1998)	28.80	New Territories Eastern Part
16	Kiu Tsui	1 June 1979	1.00	New Territories Eastern Part
17	Plover Cove (Extension)	1 June 1979	6.30	New Territories North-eastern Part
18	Shek O	21 September 1979 (modified 22 October 1993)	7.01	Hong Kong Island Eastern Part
19	Pok Fu Lam	21 September 1979	2.70	Hong Kong Island Western Part
20	Tai Tam (Quarry Bay Extension)	21 September 1979	2.70	Hong Kong Island Eastern Part
21	Clear Water Bay	28 September 1979 (modified 1993)	6.15	New Territories South-eastern Part
22	Sai Kung West (Wan Tsai Extension)	14 June 1996	1.23	New Territories Eastern Part
23	Lung Fu Shan	18 December 1998	0.47	Hong Kong Island Western Part
24	Lantau North (Extension)	7 November 2008	23.60	Lantau Island Northern Part
25	Robin's Nest	1 March 2024	5.30	New Territories Northern Part

The parks include Tai Mo Shan, Pat Sin Leng mountain range, Ma On Shan, Lion Rock, Sai Kung Peninsula, forest plantations at Shing Mun and Tai Lam, Shek Lei Pui Reservoir group, and Lantau Island. Several islands, such as Ping Chau in Mirs Bay, are included, and Hong Kong Island has six Country Parks. The Agriculture, Fisheries, and Conservation Department (AFCD) manages the parks and is responsible for tree planting, litter collection, fire fighting, development control, and recreation and education facilities. The country parks are popular with all community sectors, with about 13.5 million visitors recorded in 2011.

=== Facilities ===
Park facilities provided in recreational sites include tables and benches, barbecue pits, litter bins, children's play equipment, shelters, campsites, and toilets. Footpaths and family walks provide access to the hills and the woodlands for visitors. Major paths are being improved and waymarked through the hilly terrain.

The four long-distance hiking trails are considered to be popular among hikers:

- The MacLehose Trail (100 km) traverses the New Territories from Sai Kung in the east to Tuen Mun in the west.
- The Lantau Trail (70 km) is a circular trail on Lantau Island.
- The Hong Kong Trail (50 km) traverses all the five Country Parks on Hong Kong Island.
- The Wilson Trail (78 km) opened in January 1996 stretches from Stanley in the south of Hong Kong Island to Nam Chung in the north of the New Territories.

=== Fusion (and/or) feral humans ===
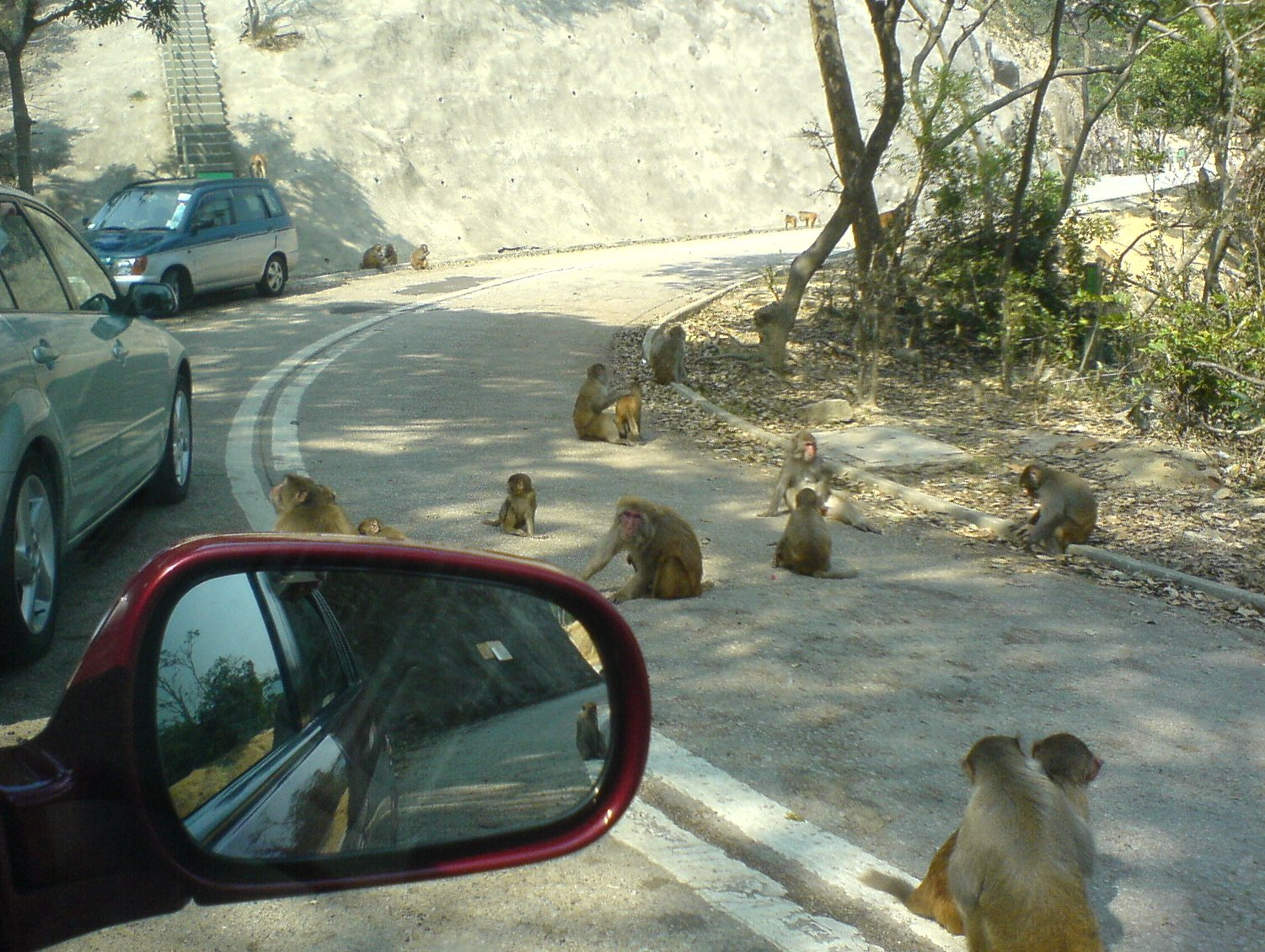
Monkeys in Golden Hill Country Park

Increasing emphasis is being given to facilities to help visitors enjoy and understand the countryside. Aberdeen, Plover Cove, Sai Kung, Clear Water Bay, Shing Mun, and Tai Mo Shan have established six visitor centers. The Lions Nature Education Centre at Tsiu Hang Special Area in Sai Kung has a collection of fruit-bearing and amenity trees, vegetables, rocks and minerals, and other local vegetation, established for nature education. The Shing Mun Arboretum has a collection of about 300 plant species. Along with nature trails and tree walks, there are on-site interpretative signs for those who wish to study nature.

AFCD has also set up a website and several fax-on-demand lines to provide the public with information about country parks. Furthermore, community-involved conservation programs such as the Corporate Afforestation Scheme, School Visit Programme, Guided Walks, and many other voluntary services have been organized. In 2004, more than 200,000 people participated in these conservation programs.

The parks and the special areas contain various vegetation, including native and introduced tree species such as camphor laurel (Cinnamomum camphora), Machilus, Schima, Acacia, slash pine, and Brisbane box. There are also animals such as barking deer, rhesus macaques, long-tailed macaques, wild boar, civet, pangolin, Chinese porcupine, and squirrel; birds such as the greater coucal, great barbet, Chinese bulbul, crested mynah, spotted dove and black-eared kite; and a large variety of insects and about 240 species of butterflies. Over 500 bird nest boxes have been introduced into country parks to enhance the breeding of birds.

The Tai Po Kau Special Area is a nature reserve and caters to those who wish to study tree, plant, bird, and insect life and provide pleasant and interesting walks. There is a total ban on the lighting of fires in the woodland area. This is Hong Kong's best site for forest birding, with species including chestnut bulbul, scarlet and grey-throated minivets, orange-bellied leafbird, fork-tailed sunbird, and scarlet-backed flowerpecker. Several species that were certainly or probably escapees from captivity have become established here – for instance, velvet-fronted nuthatch, blue-winged manila, and silver-eared mesia. Migrants occur here, especially during spring and autumn, and winter; the globally near-threatened Japanese paradise flycatcher occurs annually in small numbers.

=== Management ===
Fire is the major hazard and it bedevils park management for about six months every year. This is the time of the cool, dry winter when many people like to spend a day out in the hills-especially at weekends and public holidays. In a normal fire season there can be as many as 300 hill fires in the parks with five to seven fires a day when conditions are particularly bad. In 1986, a 34-hour blaze destroyed 282,500 trees at Shing Mun and Tai Mo Shan and ravaged 7.4 km^{2} of countryside. Fire is the greatest threat to the country parks.

Litter is another problem. One of the major tasks of park management is to collect litter left by the visitors which in 2001 totalled some 3,850 tonnes.

With such problems in mind, the Country and Marine Parks Authority has provided barbecue pits and litter bins located strategically throughout the park areas for the visitors. The Authority also prosecutes anyone found littering, damaging facilities or lighting fires outside the approved barbecue sites in the Country Parks.

A number of management centres have been established in strategic locations within the Country Parks from which construction, maintenance and protection services are provided.

=== Housing ===
In May 2021, CY Leung revived an earlier plan to build housing on less than 100 hectares of land on the fringes of country parks to in an attempt solve issues of housing in Hong Kong. Earlier in 2018, when the proposal was discussed, the Liber Research Community found almost 730 hectares of available land on brownfield sites, which would negate the need to build housing in country parks.

== Special Areas ==
Special Areas are created mainly for the purpose of nature conservation, inside or outside Country Parks.

List of Special Areas outside Country Parks:

Number	Name	Established	Area (hectares)	District
1	Tai Po Kau Nature Reserve	13 May 1977	460	New Territories
2	Tung Lung Fort	22 June 1979	3	New Territories
3	Tsiu Hang	18 December 1987	24	New Territories
4	Ma Shi Chau	9 April 1999	61	New Territories
5	Lai Chi Wo	15 March 2005	1	New Territories
6	Hong Kong Wetland Park	1 October 2005	61	New Territories
7	Double Haven	1 January 2011	0.8	New Territories
8	Ninepin Group	1 January 2011	53.1	New Territories
9	Ung Kong Group	1 January 2011	176.8	New Territories
10	Sharp Island	1 January 2011	0.06	New Territories
11	High Island	1 January 2011	3.9	New Territories

== Marine parks ==
The Marine Parks Ordinance protects and conserves the marine environment and a rich collection of aquatic animals and plants, such as corals, seagrasses, and dolphins. The ordinance also provides the legal framework for the designation, control, and management of marine parks and reserves. The Marine Parks and Marine Reserve Regulation allows the prohibition and control of certain activities in marine parks and marine reserves.

== Conservation ==
A wide variety of animal and plant life can be found in large areas of Hong Kong, especially in the New Territories. The Government's increasing concern with the protection of the natural environment has been demonstrated both by legislation and by the activities of its conservation staff. Game hunting is prohibited.

=== Habitat protection ===
About 38 percent of land in Hong Kong has been designated as country parks and special areas which provide statutory protection for the habitats of our diverse flora and fauna. In addition, 67 Sites of Special Scientific Interest (SSSIs) have been listed to recognize these sites' scientific importance and ensure that due consideration to conservation is given when developments in or near these sites are proposed. For example, San Chau and Ngong Ping at Lantau have been listed as SSSIs in recognition of the largest population of Rhododendron champion and Romer's Tree Frog (Philautus Romero) in Hong Kong, respectively. Tree Frogs normally appear in Hong Kong.

=== Flora ===
The flora of Hong Kong is diverse in character and surprisingly numerous in species. Many typical species of the Southeast Asian tropical flora are seen here at the limit of their northern distribution range. More than 3,100 species and varieties of vascular plants have been recorded in Hong Kong, approximately 2,100 of which are native, and the rest are of exotic origin. Many species of plants in Hong Kong are noteworthy for the beauty or fragrance of their blossoms. Bauhinia blakeana (Hong Kong Orchid Tree) was discovered in 1908 at Pok Fu Lam. It is among the finest of the Bauhinia genus anywhere in the world. The bauhinia flower is prominently featured on the flag of Hong Kong. It is widely planted – being propagated by cuttings since its seeds are usually sterile.

==== Hong Kong Herbarium ====
AFCD's Hong Kong Herbarium is responsible for the systematic collection, identification, and curation of Hong Kong flora plant specimens. It plays a significant role in supporting the studies on taxonomy, ecology, and conservation of Hong Kong flora. Established in 1878, it houses approximately 48,000 plant specimens and is equipped with a specialized library to support its function.

==== Conservation of flora ====
Efforts have been made to conserve rare and endangered plant species. In addition to habitat protection, they are also conserved through the following approaches.

- Species protection: Under the Forests and Countryside Ordinance, damaging a plant in any forest or plantation on government land is prohibited. Some rare and attractive species are specifically listed in the Forestry Regulations to control the sale and possession of such listed species as Camellia species, Enkianthus quinqueflorus, Iris speculatrix, and Impatiens hongkongensis.
- Active propagation: Various methods such as seed collection, cutting, air layering, etc., have been attempted to propagate rare and endangered plants. Transplantation may also be carried out if their habitats are under threat. Successful examples of active propagation include Keteleeria fortunei, Camellia crapnelliana, and Camellia granthamiana.
- Ex-situ conservation: A base for flora conservation has been set up at the Shing Mun Arboretum. About 300 species, including some rare species, have been propagated and established for conservation purposes.

=== Terrestrial mammals ===
Larger wild mammals are declining in Hong Kong, mainly because of the increased urbanization. Civets, leopard cats, and Chinese porcupines are seen occasionally at night in the New Territories. Indian muntjac (also called barking deer) are uncommon but are heard and seen in wooded areas. There are wild boar in some remote areas, occasionally causing damage to crops. Unlike others, rhesus macaques are easily seen in Kam Shan Country Park. Visitors are reminded not to feed these wild animals as uncontrolled feeding has led to unnatural growth of the monkey population and caused nuisances. A feeding ban has been implemented and enforced in the area since July 1999 to help the monkeys revert to foraging natural food in the natural environment. Smaller mammals such as squirrels, the woodland shrew, house shrew, and bats are common in rural areas. As of 2005, some 54 species of terrestrial mammals have been recorded in Hong Kong.

=== Birds ===
Hong Kong is a major stopover point for Asia's bird migration routes. The wide varieties of local habitats, including wetlands, grasslands, woodlands, seashores, and farmlands, contribute to the diversity of the birds. There are over 490 species of wild birds, including residents, winter visitors, passage migrants, and summer visitors recorded in Hong Kong. Some of these are globally endangered species, such as Black-faced Spoonbill. About 120 species have been recorded breeding in the territory. The Mai Po Marshes are listed as a restricted area, and access is restricted to permit holders. This mudflat, mangrove, and shrimp ponds area is the richest habitat for migratory birds. More than 320 species of birds have been recorded in the area, and about 120 of these are rarely seen elsewhere in the territory. The Marshes form part of the 15 km^{2} Mai Po Inner Deep Bay Ramsar Site, listed in 1995 as a Wetland of International Importance under the Ramsar Convention. This area is also one of the East Asian – Australasian Shorebird Reserve Network participants.

=== Amphibians and reptiles ===
Hong Kong has over 100 species of amphibians and reptiles. Among them, over 40 species are snakes. Most snakes in Hong Kong are harmless, and there have been very few cases of known bites by highly venomous snakes. There are nine species of chelonians found in Hong Kong, of which the Green Turtle is of particular interest in that it is the only known species of sea turtle breeding locally. The nesting site of Green Turtles at Sham Wan of Lamma Island was designated a restricted area in 1999 to protect the species during the breeding season. Hong Kong has a total of 23 species of amphibians. The Hong Kong Cascade Frog, Hong Kong Newt, and the endemic Romer's Tree Frog have been listed under the Wild Animals Protection Ordinance due to their rarity. A site that supports the largest population of the Romer's Tree Frog – part of Ngong Ping on Lantau Island was also designated as SSSI in May 1999.

=== Insects ===
Hong Kong has rich insect fauna. At least 6,784 species have been recorded so far, and 700 additional species are expected to be found. About 240 butterfly species, including the beautiful swallowtails and birdwings (Troides Helena and Troides Aeacus). Of over 2,000 moth species recorded, the Atlas moth (Attacus atlas) is outstanding for its large size with a wingspan up to 30 centimeters. In contrast, the Chinese moon moth (Actias ningpoana) is eye-catching for its long hindwing tails. Endemic moth species include Athletes hongkongensis, Agia purpurea, Athletes bispurca, and Egira ambigua. The dragonfly fauna is diverse, with over 110 species recorded, some of which are endemic to Hong Kong. Hong Kong also has 235 species of ants, 17 species of praying mantids, 31 species of cockroaches, six species of flea, 78 species of mosquitoes, and 124 species of grasshoppers. 4,583 species are plant-eating (phytophagous), and over 1,000 species are beneficial insects either preying on or existing as parasites over other pests.

=== Aquatic animals ===
The marine fauna of Hong Kong is exceptionally diverse. Though primarily tropical, it is an admixture of the tropical South China Sea and temperate Chinese forms because of the seasonal fluctuations of warm and cold water and monsoon weather conditions. Of an estimated 1,800 species of fish on the South China continental shelf, clupeoids, croakers, and sea breams are the dominant groups in Hong Kong waters. Farther offshore, golden thread, big-eyes, and others are also highly valued to fishermen. Marine invertebrates are also abundant – ranging from corals and mollusks to crustaceans. There are 84 species of stony corals in Hong Kong. The richest coral communities prevail to the east of Hong Kong, where the waters are both sheltered and free from the influence of the Pearl River. Marine mammals, the Chinese White Dolphin, and Finless Porpoise are resident species and can be found year-round. All cetaceans are protected in Hong Kong under the Wild Animals Protection Ordinance. More than 120 species of native freshwater fish were recorded, of which about 30 primary freshwater species spend their entire lives in freshwaters. Of the primary freshwater fish, cyprinids are dominant.There are four freshwater crab species described and recorded from Hong Kong, and so far considered endemics: Three potamids, of which two belong to the genus Nanhaipotamon (N. hongkongense and N.aculatum) and one to the genus Cryptopotamon (C. anacoluthon), and one gecarcinucid, Somanniathelphusa zanklon.[1]

== See also ==
- Geography of Hong Kong
- List of bays in Hong Kong
- List of harbours in Hong Kong
- List of rivers in Hong Kong
- List of mountains, peaks and hills in Hong Kong
- Environment of Hong Kong
- Species first discovered in Hong Kong
- Beaches of Hong Kong
- List of urban public parks and gardens in Hong Kong
- List of areas of Hong Kong
- List of buildings and structures in Hong Kong
- Hong Kong National Geopark
- List of national parks around the world
- List of long-distance footpaths: Hong Kong
- River trekking
- Geology of Hong Kong
- Heritage conservation in Hong Kong
- Hong Kong Map- Hong Kong Country Parks Attractions Informations and Photos
