= Mirs Bay =

Bay in northeast Hong Kong

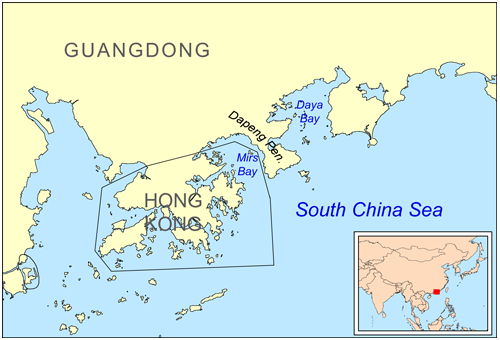
- Traditional Chinese: 大鵬灣
- Simplified Chinese: 大鹏湾
- Literal meaning: Dapeng Bay
Transcriptions
Standard Mandarin
- Hanyu Pinyin: Dàpéng Wān
Yue: Cantonese
- Jyutping: daai6 paang4 waan1

Mirs Bay (also known as Tai Pang Wan, Dapeng Wan, Dapeng Bay or Mers Bay; traditional Chinese: 大鵬灣; simplified Chinese: 大鹏湾) is a bay in the northeast of Kat O and Sai Kung Peninsula of Hong Kong. The north and east shores are surrounded by Yantian and Dapeng New District of Shenzhen. Ping Chau stands in the midst of the bay.

== History ==
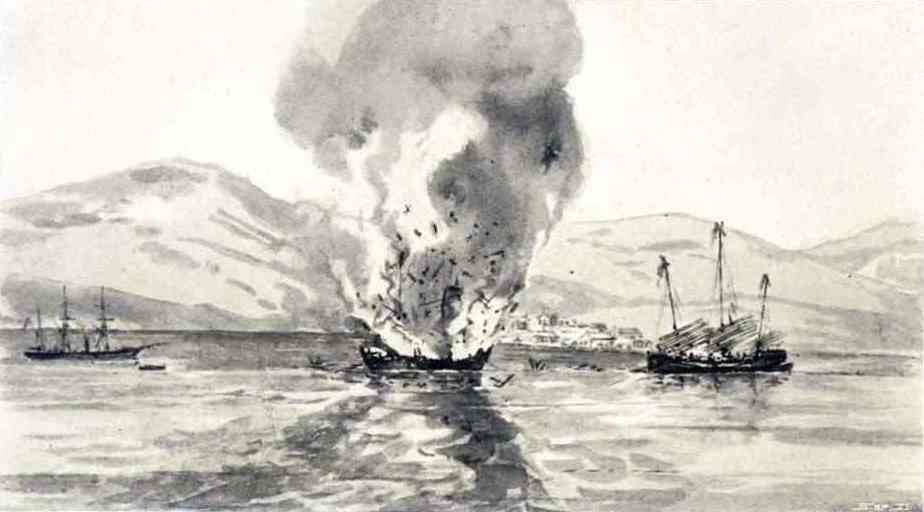
Pirate junks in Mirs Bay

Mirs Bay, along with other waterways near Hong Kong, was once was home to various coastal defences (e.g. Dapeng Fortress) used against pirates during the Ming Dynasty.

Mirs Bay was used by then American Commodore (later Admiral) George Washington Dewey during the Spanish–American War as a refuge and repair facility for the US Navy.

In 1949, the colonial government imposed a curfew under the Public Order Ordinance forbidding movement of watercraft in Mirs Bay between 10 PM and 6 AM without written permission of the Hong Kong Police Force. For purposes of the order, the dividing line between Tolo Channel and Mirs Bay runs from Wong Chuk Kok Tsui to Ngo Keng Tsui (鵝頸咀; 22.4629544°N 114.3022423°E).

== Features ==
Within the bay are numerous smaller harbors and inlets on the Hong Kong side:

- Kat O Hoi
- Hoi Ha Bay
- Tai Tan Hoi
- Starling Inlet
- Sha Tin Hoi
- Tai Po Hoi
- Wong Chuk Kok Hoi

The bay includes a number of islands, with an extensive group lying in the northwestern part of the bay, including:

- Double Island
- Crescent Island
- Crooked Island
- Grass Island, at the western side of the entrance to Mirs Bay
- Round Island

To the south of Mirs Bay, water flows out to the South China Sea.
