= Double Island, Hong Kong =

Island in the north-eastern part of Hong Kong

Coordinates: 22°30′45″N 114°18′37″E

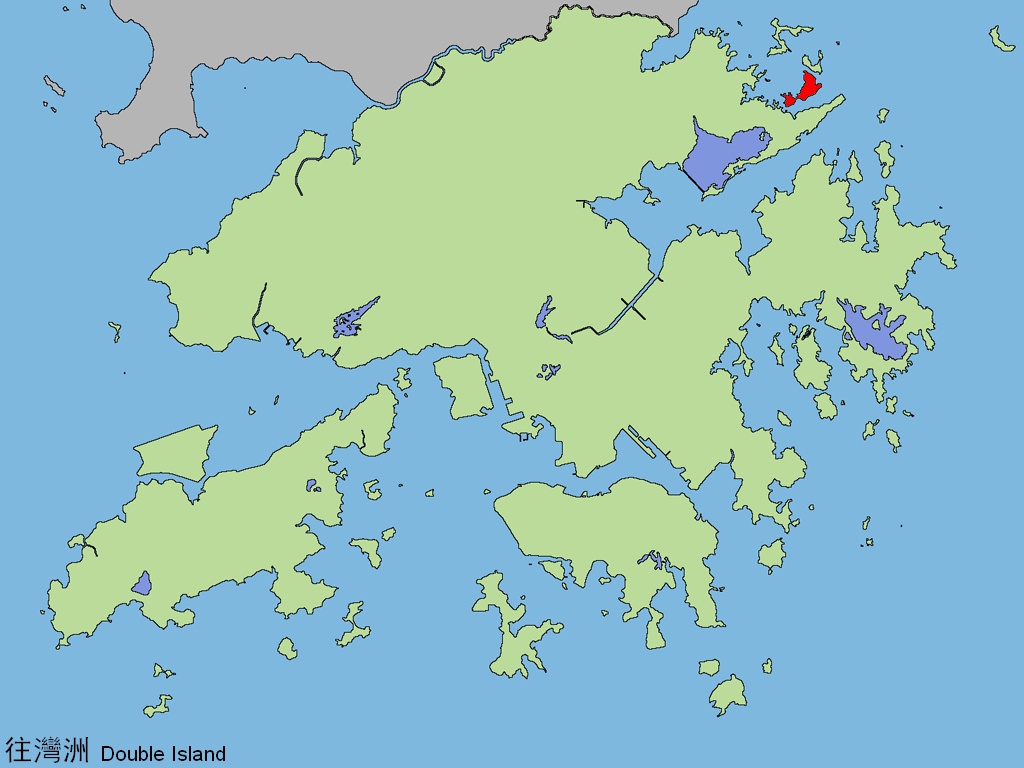
Location of Double Island in Hong Kong

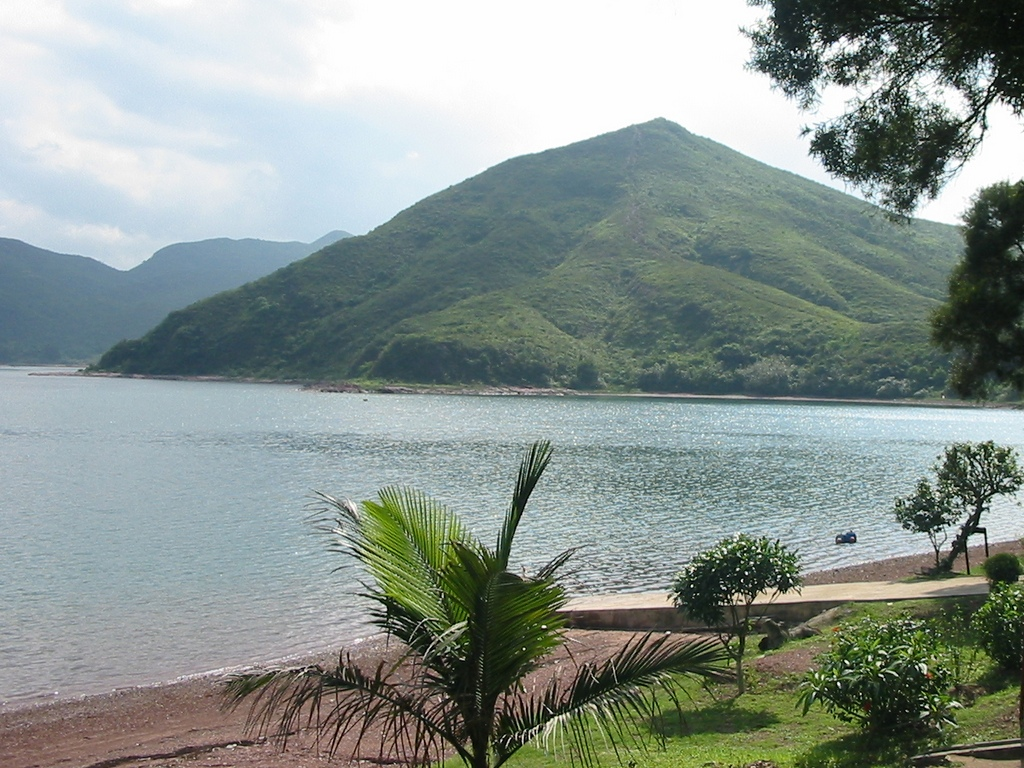
View of Wong Wai Sai Teng (往灣西頂), a 136m high hill on Wong Wan Chau, from across Wong Wan (往灣) bay.

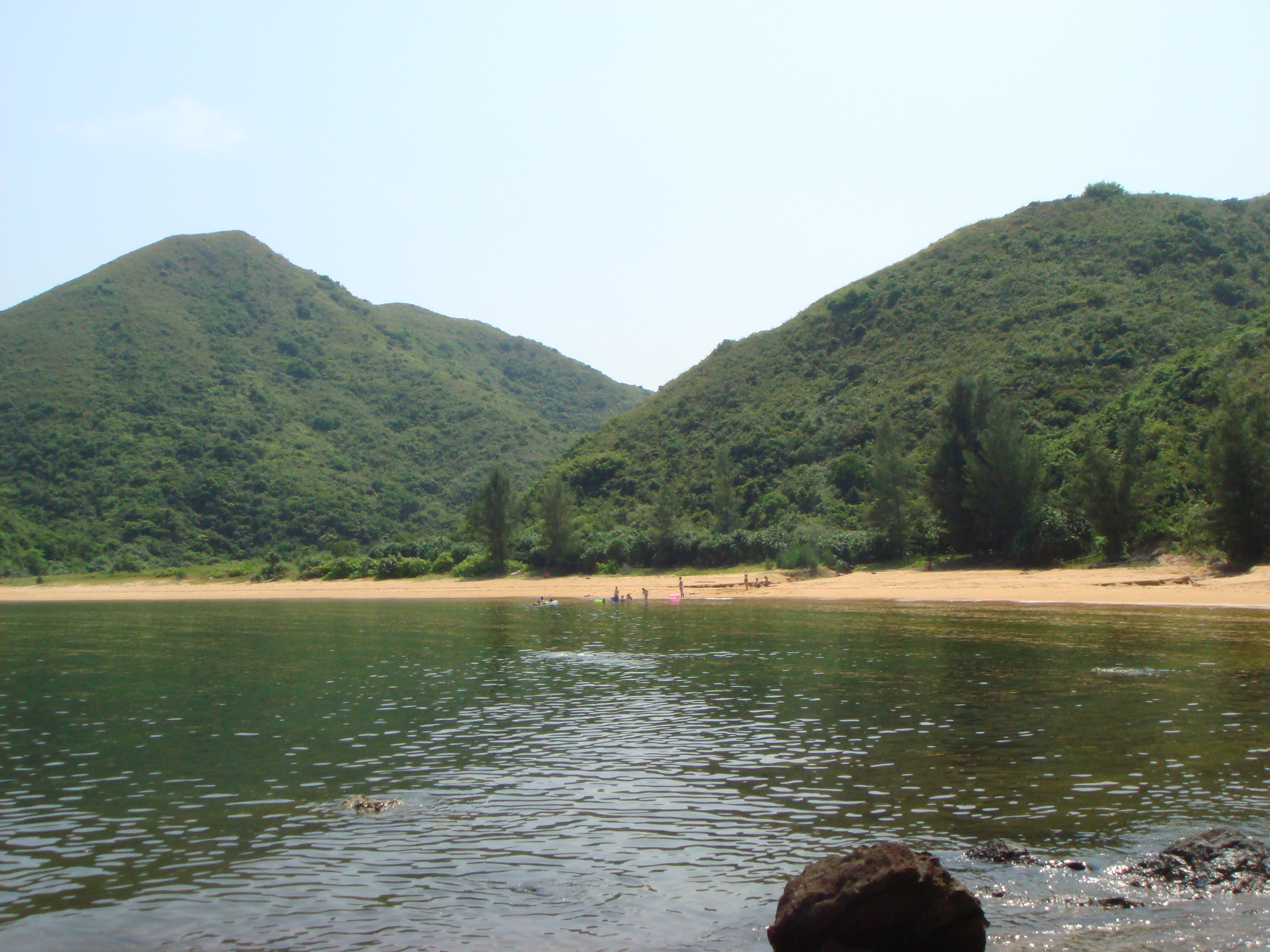
Beach at Tung Wan (東灣; 'East Bay') of Double Island.

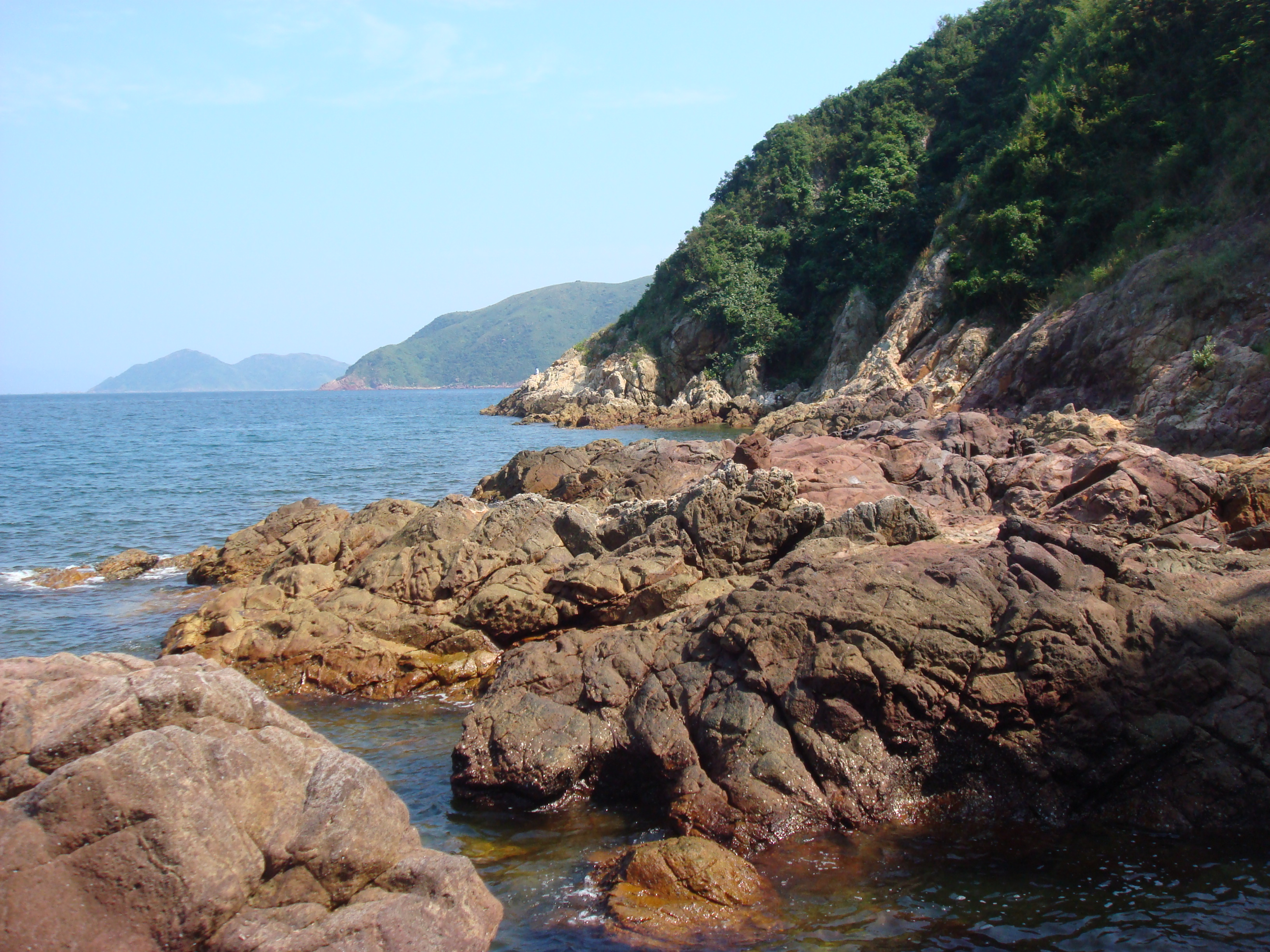
Coast of Double Island at Tung Wan (東灣; 'East Bay').

Double Island or Wong Wan Chau (Chinese: 往灣洲) is an island located in the north-eastern part of Hong Kong. Administratively, it is part of North District.

== Geography ==
Double Island has an area of 2.13 km². It is the second largest island in North District, the largest being Crooked Island. Its highest point is at 139 m. Its western coast is facing Double Haven.

Wong Wan (往灣) is a bay of Double Island. It is one of the 26 designated marine fish culture zones in Hong Kong.

== Conservation ==
Double Island became part of the Plover Cove (Extension) Country Park in 1979.

== Facilities ==
- Outward Bound Hong Kong Adventure Base

== History ==
=== Typhoon of 1858 ===
It is wrongly suggested that it was the Double Island in Hong Kong's Double Haven (Yan Chau Tong, 印洲塘) where the September Typhoon of 1858 destroyed several well-known opium clippers, including the Anonyma, Gazelle, Pantaloon, and Mazeppa. Basil Lubbock's The Opium Clippers, cited in the original entry, is quite clear (p.347) that the Double Island in question was that at what was then called Swatow (today Shantou). The island is one of two that lie in the entrance to the river at Shantou and is the inner one, then called Masu. Today it is called Mayu (媽嶼島). For corroboration see Mayers & Dennys, for the identity of Double Island. For the typhoon and the damage to the vessels, The Courier (Hobart, Tasmania), 22 December 1858, p.3 for a report of Mr Midwood, of the Commissariat service, resident on Double Island during the typhoon.

== See also ==
- Mirs Bay
