= North District, Hong Kong =

District in New Territories, Hong Kong

North District 北區
- District
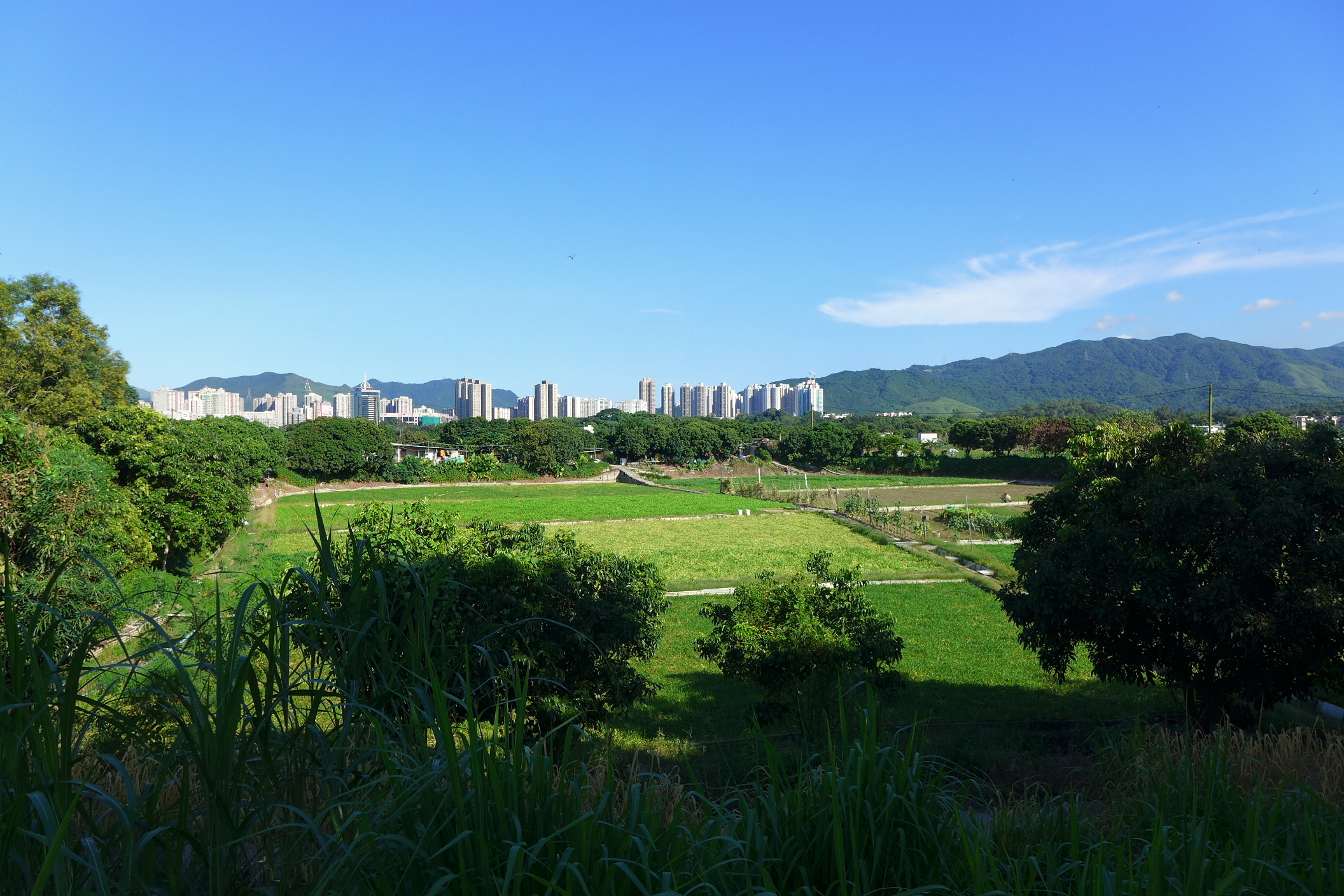
- Day view of Long Valley in the North District

- Location of North within Hong Kong
- Coordinates: 22°29′41″N 114°08′17″E
- Country: China
- Region: Hong Kong
- Constituencies: 16

Government
  - District Council Chairman: Law Ting-Tak (Independent)
  - District Council Vice-Chairman: Li Kon-hong
  - District Officer: Chong Wing-wun

Area
  - Total: 168 km^{2} (65 sq mi)

Population (2016)
  - Total: 315,270
  - Density: 1,880/km^{2} (4,860/sq mi)
- Time zone: UTC+8 (Hong Kong Time)
- Website: North District Council

North District
- Traditional Chinese: 北區
- Simplified Chinese: 北区
- Jyutping: Bak1 Keoi1
Transcriptions
Hakka
- Romanization: Bet^{5}Ki^{1}
Yue: Cantonese
- Yale Romanization: Bāk Kēui
- Jyutping: Bak1 Keoi1
- IPA: [pɐk̚˥ kʰɵɥ˥]

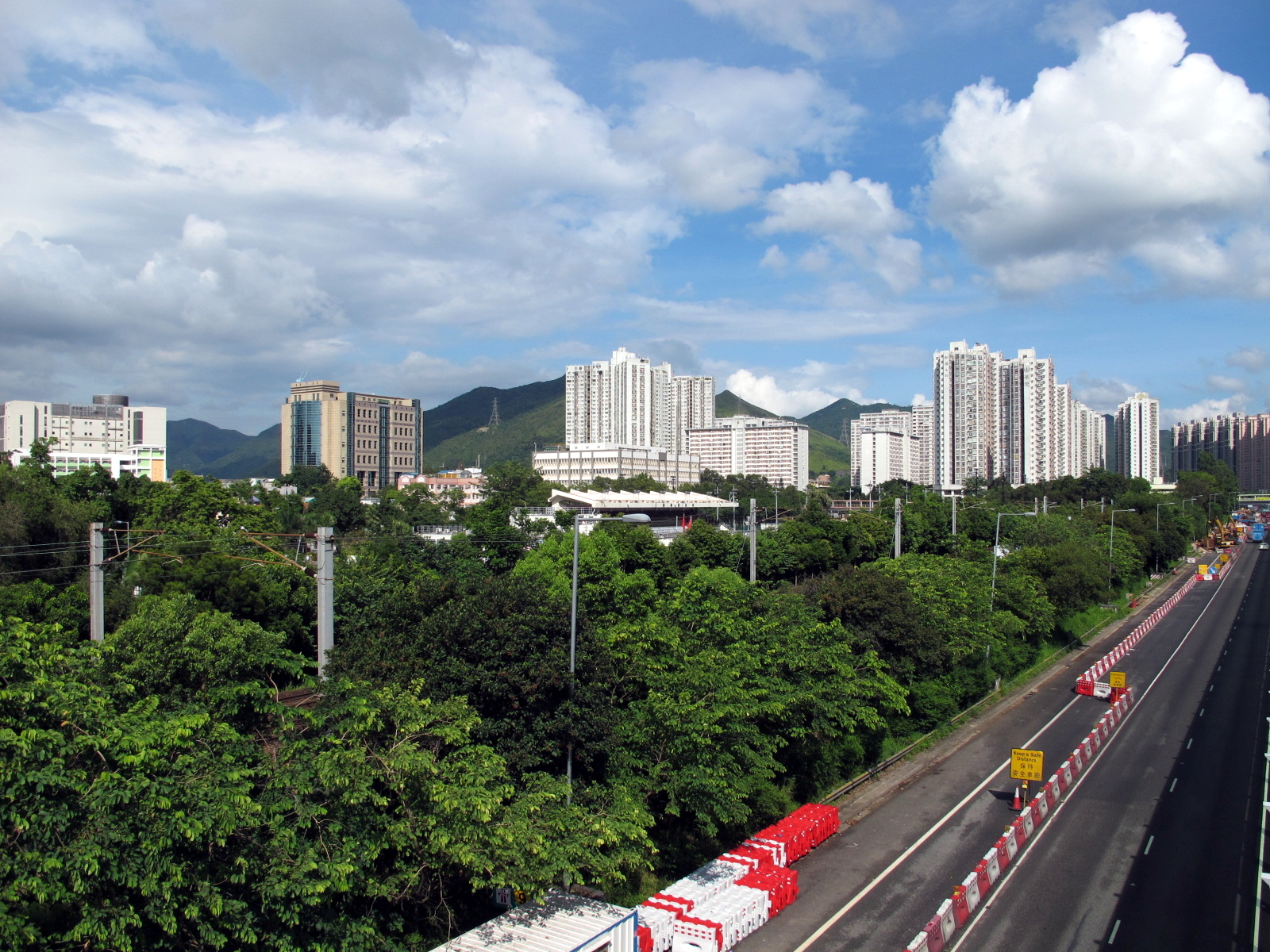
Fanling New Town

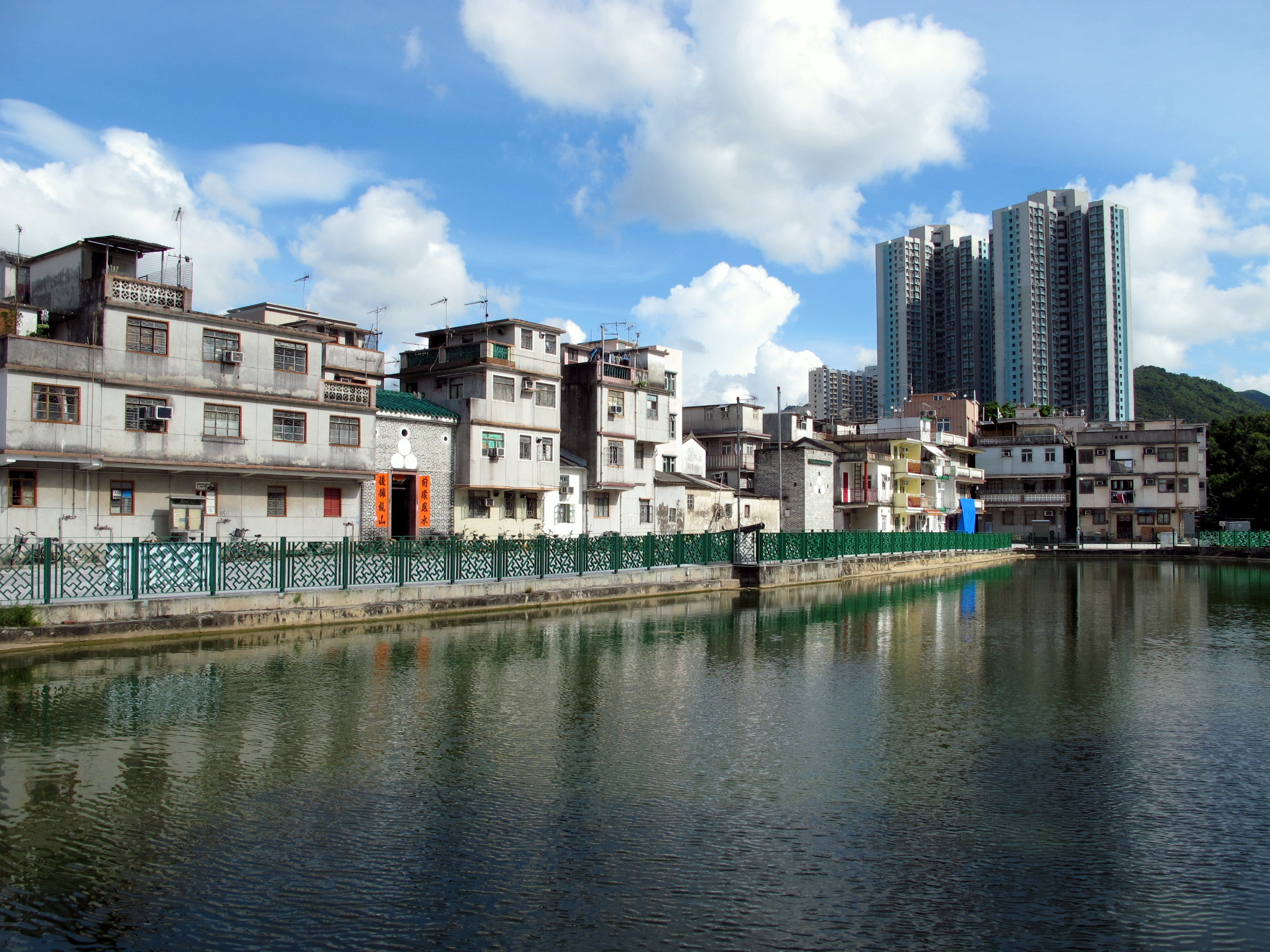
Fanling Wai

The North District (Chinese: 北區) is the northernmost district of the 18 districts of Hong Kong. It is located in the northeastern part of the New Territories. The new town of Fanling–Sheung Shui is within this district. It had a population of 298,657 in 2001. The district has the second lowest population density in Hong Kong.

It borders with Shenzhen city with the Sham Chun River. Most major access points to mainland China from Hong Kong lie in this district. The North District is about 168 km^{2} (65 sq mi) in area.

== Demographics ==
According to statistics, 70% of the district population lives in the public estates in the Fanling–Sheung Shui New Town. 40,000 villagers living around the two town centres and the main rural towns (Sha Tau Kok and Ta Kwu Ling) account for most residents in the district.

== Islands of the district ==
- A Chau (鴉洲)
- Ap Chau Mei Pak Tun Pai (鴨洲尾白墩排)
- Ap Chau Pak Tun Pai (鴨洲白墩排)
- Ap Chau (鴨洲, Robinson Island)
- Ap Lo Chun (鴨螺春)
- Ap Tan Pai (鴨蛋排)
- Ap Tau Pai (鴨兜排)
- Chap Mo Chau (執毛洲)
- Cheung Shek Tsui (長石咀)
- Fu Wong Chau (虎王洲)
- Fun Chau (墳洲)
- Hung Pai (紅排)
- Kat O Chau (吉澳洲, Crooked Island)
- Ko Pai (高排)
- Kok Tai Pai (角大排)
- Lan Shuen Pei (爛樹排)
- Lo Chi Pai (鷀鸕排)
- Ngo Mei Chau (娥眉洲, Crescent Island)
- Pak Ka Chau (筆架洲)
- Pak Sha Chau (白沙洲, Round Island)
- Pat Ka Chau (筆架洲)
- Sai Ap Chau (細鴨洲)
- Sha Pai (沙排)
- Shau Kei Pai (筲箕排)
- Sheung Pai (雙排)
- Shui Cham Tsui Pai (水浸咀排)
- Siu Nim Chau (小稔洲)
- Ta Ho Pai (打蠔排)
- Tai Nim Chau (大稔洲)
- Tsing Chau (青洲, Table Island)
- Wong Nai Chau (黃泥洲)
- Wong Nai Chau (黃泥洲)
- Wong Wan Chau (往灣洲, Double Island)
- Wu Chau (烏洲)
- Wu Pai (烏排)
- Wu Yeung Chau Pai (湖洋洲排)
- Yan Chau (印洲)
- Yeung Chau (洋洲)

== Education ==
Hong Kong Public Libraries has four libraries in the district: Fanling, Fanling South, Sha Tau Kok, and Sheung Shui.

== Miscellaneous ==
The northern end of the Wilson Trail hiking path is located in the North District. The trail ends at Nam Chung.

== Transport ==
North District is served by the East Rail line, Fanling Highway, San Tin Highway and Sha Tau Kok Road.

=== MTR Stations ===
- Fanling station
- Sheung Shui station
- Lo Wu station (terminus of East Rail line)

=== Border crossings ===
- Sha Tau Kok (road)
- Man Kam To (road)
- Lo Wu (train)

== See also ==
- Fanling
- Frontier Closed Area
- Wo Hop Shek
- List of areas of Hong Kong
- North District FC
