= Wong Ka Wai =

Wong Ka Wai may refer to:

- Kawai Wong (born Wong Ka Wai (黃家惠), Hong Kong magazine editor, writer and fashion stylist
- Wong Ka Wai (Tung Chung) (黃家圍) in Tung Chung, Lantau Island
- Wong Ka Wai (Tuen Mun) (皇家圍) in San Hui
