= Kawai Wong =

Hong Kong magazine editor

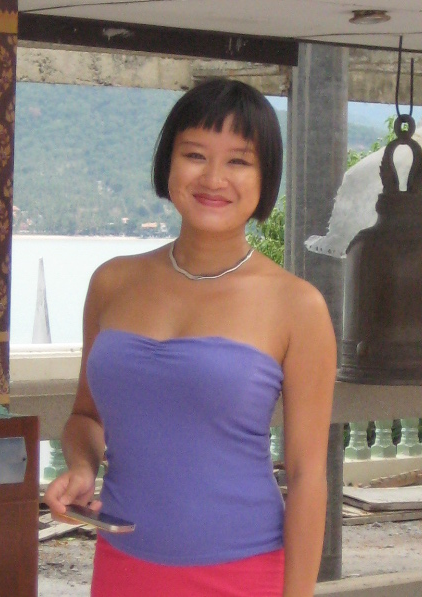
- Kawai Wong, in 2012
- Born: 4 February 1986 (age 40); Hong Kong, British Hong Kong
- Education: Imperial College London
- Occupations: Journalist, magazine editor, writer, fashion stylist

Chinese name
- Traditional Chinese: 黃家惠
- Simplified Chinese: 黄家惠
Transcriptions
Standard Mandarin
- Hanyu Pinyin: Huáng Jiāhuì

Kawai Wong (born Wong Ka Wai (黃家惠); 4 February 1986) is a magazine editor, writer and fashion stylist. She started her Hong Kong journalism career with Time Out Hong Kong in 2010 and went on to edit the Shopping & Style section. Wong helped to re-invent the section by adding new regular fixtures such as Things We Love About... and Style Agenda. Her notable works include a one-on-one interview with Tom Ford in 2011 and a six-hour interview with the "King of Asian Pop" Eason Chan in 2012. Wong also contributed to the official website of Hong Kong Tourism Board and translated articles for the arts webzine City Reborn. She had worked with Sasha Slater at London Evening Standard and Hilary Alexander at The Daily Telegraph. Wanderlister+ dubbed Wong a "tough as nail interviewer" in 2012.

== Early life and background ==
Wong was born in Hong Kong and was educated at New Territories Heung Yee Kuk Yuen Long District Secondary School. She was briefly exchanged to Singapore's Zhonghua Secondary School in 2000. After spending a year as the chairperson of her Hong Kong school's Student Association, Wong won a scholarship to study in the UK before reading Biochemistry at Imperial College London. She became the fashion editor of the college's weekly newspaper Felix, where she creative directed a fashion photoshoot in association with Oxfam and Toni&Guy. She also interviewed Bruce Pask (of The New York Times T Magazine), Harold Tillman and Hilary Alexander for the student newspaper. Wong was the editor of the college's annual arts magazine, Phoenix.

== Career ==
At Time Out Hong Kong, Wong interviewed fashion figures Tom Ford, Victoria Beckham, Anna Dello Russo, Gareth Pugh, Henry Holland, Richard Nicoll, Christian Audigier, Georgina Goodman, Kevin Carrigan, as well as helping to expand the Made in Hong Kong section to put hitherto little known design talents on the Hong Kong media map. Wong was the first in the English media to write feature length articles about Hong Kong fashion icon Joey Ma and fashion designer Singchin Lo of Plotz. Wong also pioneered new fixtures in the magazine, including Things We Love About... and Style Agenda. Wong creative directed fashion shoots involving notable Chinese celebrities including Sammi Cheng, Wyman Wong and Eason Chan.

Apart from entertainment and fashion related works, Wong also participates in cultural and political writing. In 2010, Wong interviewed comic artist Lau Wan Kit about his top-selling pop-up book. In 2011, Wong wrote an article documenting the verbal gaffes of Henry Tang, one of the three candidates running for the 2012 Hong Kong Chief Executive election. Political blog Biglychee dubbed the writing "hilarious". In 2012, Wong mediated a question and answer session with celebrity jeweller Stephen Webster at Liberatum Hong Kong. Wong has also interviewed Pablo Ganguli, editorial director of Vogue China Angelica Cheung amongst many other social/cultural figures.

== Tom Ford ==
Wong's Time Out interview with Tom Ford in 2011 was reprinted in Dubai, Beirut, Beijing, Amsterdam and London. The interview courted internet controversy, leading to a widespread online debate . The interview was discussed on Vogue, Huffington Post and many other online media outlets.
