= Demet Müftüoğlu =

Turkish stylist (born 1974)

Demet Müftüoğlu Eşeli (born 1974) is a curator, creative director and the co-founder of ISTANBUL’74. Since 2010, she has been the Creative Head of Istanbul International Arts & Culture Festival (IST. FESTIVAL) which she produced with Alphan Eşeli for the festival founder Liberatum and Pablo Ganguli.

== Background & Early Life ==
Demet Müftüoğlu-Eşeli studied Business Administration at Bilkent University, followed by a move to New York where she studied at the Fashion Institute of Technology.

== ISTANBUL’74 and Career ==
In 2009, Müftüoğlu-Eşeli co-founded ISTANBUL'74 with her husband Alphan Eşeli, an independent platform that has been organizing cultural events festivals, exhibitions and artistic collaborations with creative thought leaders from around the world. ISTANBUL’74 has collaborated with leading international galleries such as Lehmann Maupin Gagosian , Hauser and Wirth as well as designers and artists including Sandro Kopp Tracy Emin, Alex Prager, Angel Otero, Robin Rhode, JR, Idris Khan, Jonah Freeman & Justin Lowe, José Parlá, Inez & Vinoodh, Anton Corbijn, Defne Koz, Kezban Arca Batıbeki, Mehmet Ali Uysal, Diana Al-Hadid, Delfina Delettrez, André Saraiva, Robert Montgomery Stephen Jones, Sandro Kopp, Waris Ahluwalia amongst others.

In 2010, Müftüoğlu-Eşeli produced the Istanbul International Arts and Culture Festival, (IST. Festival) for Liberatum and festival creator Pablo Ganguli.
