= Istancool =

Istancool, also known as the Istanbul International Arts & Culture Festival and IST. Festival, is an annual international cultural celebration in Istanbul, created by Liberatum as the brainchild of Pablo Ganguli, and first held in 2010 to celebrate the city's 2010 European Capital of Culture status.

The festival was founded by the famed entrepreneur Pablo Ganguli. Film director Alphan Eşeli and his wife Demet Muftuoglu, and Dazed & Confused editor Jefferson Hack were producers. Ganguli described the aims as "to bring both local and international creative minds to Turkish audiences for a programme that does not understand citizenship, passport, themes, race, gender or visa". Istancool was sponsored by the Turkish Ministry of Culture and Tourism, Güler Sabancı, W Istanbul and Vakko. It was the first venture of Liberatum in Turkey. Participants have included global creative icons including Ganguli's collaborators V. S. Naipaul, Zaha Hadid, Terence Koh, Haluk Akakçe, Gareth Pugh, Lily Cole, Tilda Swinton, Kirsten Dunst, Sophie Calle, Reha Erdem, Serra Yilmaz, Courtney Love, Terry Gilliam, Michael Stipe, Gore Vidal, Daphne Guinness, Philip Treacy, Michael Nyman, Hanif Kureishi and Stephen Frears.

The festival took place for the fourth time in June 2014.

== See also ==
- Istanbul International Music Festival
