= Sha Tau Kok Chuen =

Public housing estate in Sha Tau Kok, Hong Kong

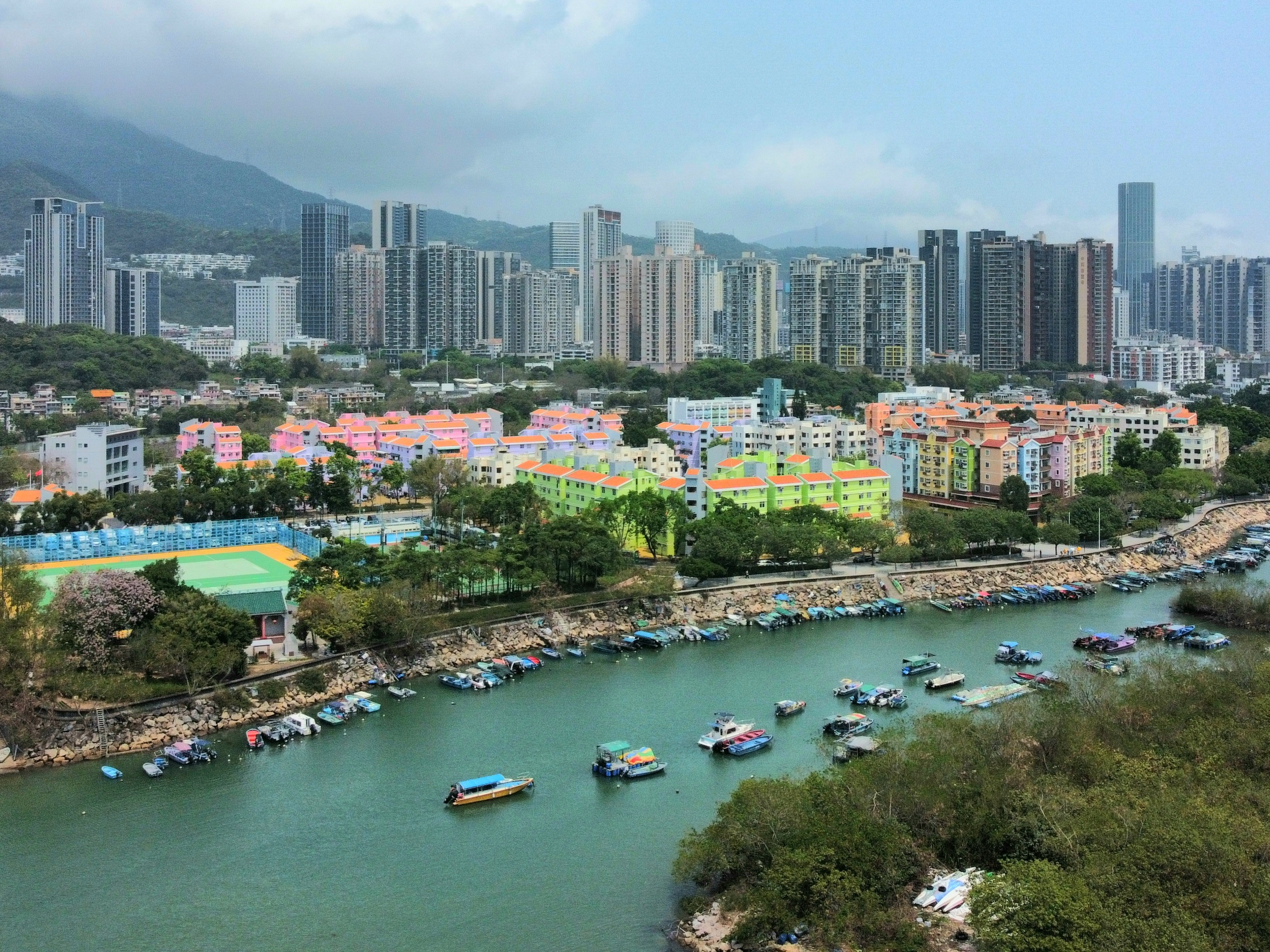
- The colourful apartment blocks of Sha Tau Kok Chuen (foreground) in 2024
- Interactive map of Sha Tau Kok Chuen

General information
- Location: Shun Hing Street, Sha Tau Kok; New Territories, Hong Kong
- Coordinates: 22.546°N 114.222°E
- Status: Completed
- Category: Public rental housing
- No. of blocks: 52
- No. of units: 802

Construction
- Constructed: 1988; 38 years ago
- Authority: Hong Kong Housing Society

Sha Tau Kok Chuen
- Traditional Chinese: 沙頭角邨
- Simplified Chinese: 沙头角邨
Transcriptions
Standard Mandarin
- Hanyu Pinyin: Shā Tóu Jiǎo Cūn
Yue: Cantonese
- Jyutping: Saa1 Tau4 Gok3 Cyun1

Sha Tau Kok Chuen (Chinese: 沙頭角邨) is a public housing estate developed by the Hong Kong Housing Society within the Frontier Closed Area in Sha Tau Kok, New Territories, Hong Kong. It was built to resettle the aboriginal residents of Yim Liu Ha and Tsoi Yuen Kok (菜園角) affected by redevelopment in Sha Tau Kok Closed Area, consisting of 52 residential blocks completed in 1988, 1989, 1991 and 2017 respectively. It is the public housing estate with the most blocks in Hong Kong and is the only public housing estate to be located within the Frontier Closed Area.

Hong Kong Public Libraries operates the Sha Tau Kok Public Library in Ying Hoi House, Sha Tau Kok Chuen.

== Houses ==
Name	Chinese name	Completed
Block 1	第1座	1988
Block 2	第2座	1988
Block 3	第3座	1988
Block 4	第4座	1988
Block 5	第5座	1988
Block 6	第6座	1988
Block 7	第7座	1988
Block 8	第8座	1988
Block 9	第9座	1988
Block 10	第10座	1988
Block 11	第11座	1988
Block 12	第12座	1988
Block 13	第13座	1988
Block 14	第14座	1988
Block 15	第15座	1988
Block 16	第16座	1988
Block 17	第17座	1988
Block 18	第18座	1988
Block 19	第19座	1988
Block 20	第20座	1988
Block 21	第21座	1988
Block 22	第22座	1988
Block 23	第23座	1988
Block 24	第24座	1988
Block 25	第25座	1991
Block 26	第26座	1991
Block 27	第27座	1991
Block 28	第28座	1989
Block 29	第29座	1989
Block 30	第30座	1989
Block 31	第31座	1989
Block 32	第32座	1989
Block 33	第33座	1989
Block 34	第34座	1989
Block 35	第35座	1989
Block 36	第36座	1989
Block 37	第37座	1989
Block 38	第38座	1989
Block 39	第39座	1989
Block 40	第40座	1989
Block 41	第41座	1989
Block 42	第42座	1991
Block 43	第43座	1991
Block 44	第44座	1991
Block 45	第45座	1991
Block 46	第46座	1991
Block 47	第47座	1991
Block 48	第48座	1991
Block 49	第49座	1991
Block 50	第50座	1991
Block 51	第51座	1991
Ying Hoi House (Block 52)	迎海樓 (第52座)	2017

== Politics ==
Sha Tau Kok Chuen is located in Sha Ta constituency of the North District Council. It is currently represented by Vincent Ko Wai-kei, who was elected in the 2019 elections.

== See also ==
- Sha Tau Kok
