= Sha Tau Kok Public Pier =

Public pier in North District, Hong Kong

Coordinates: 22.5427°N 114.2265°E

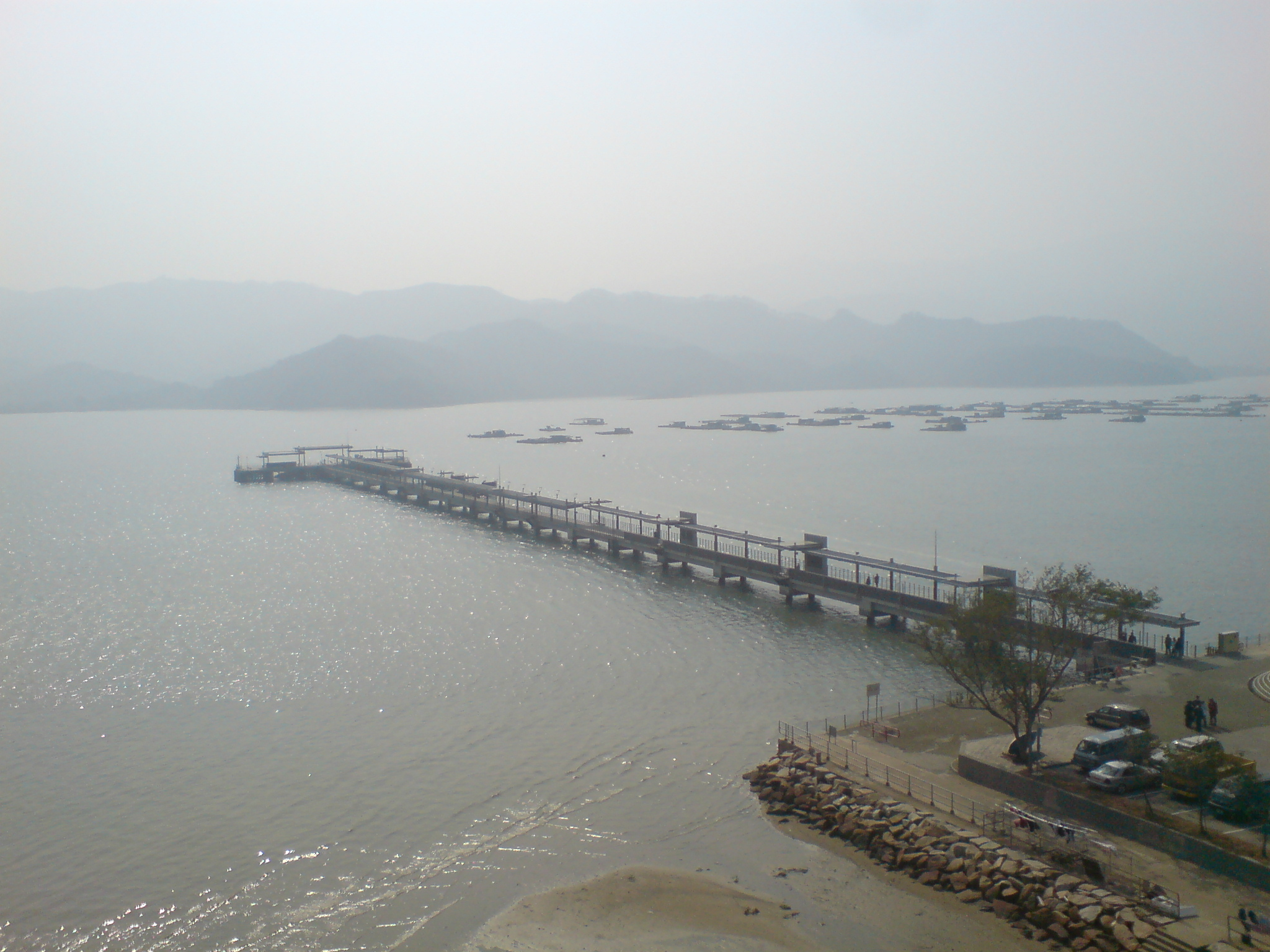
Sha Tau Kok Public Pier

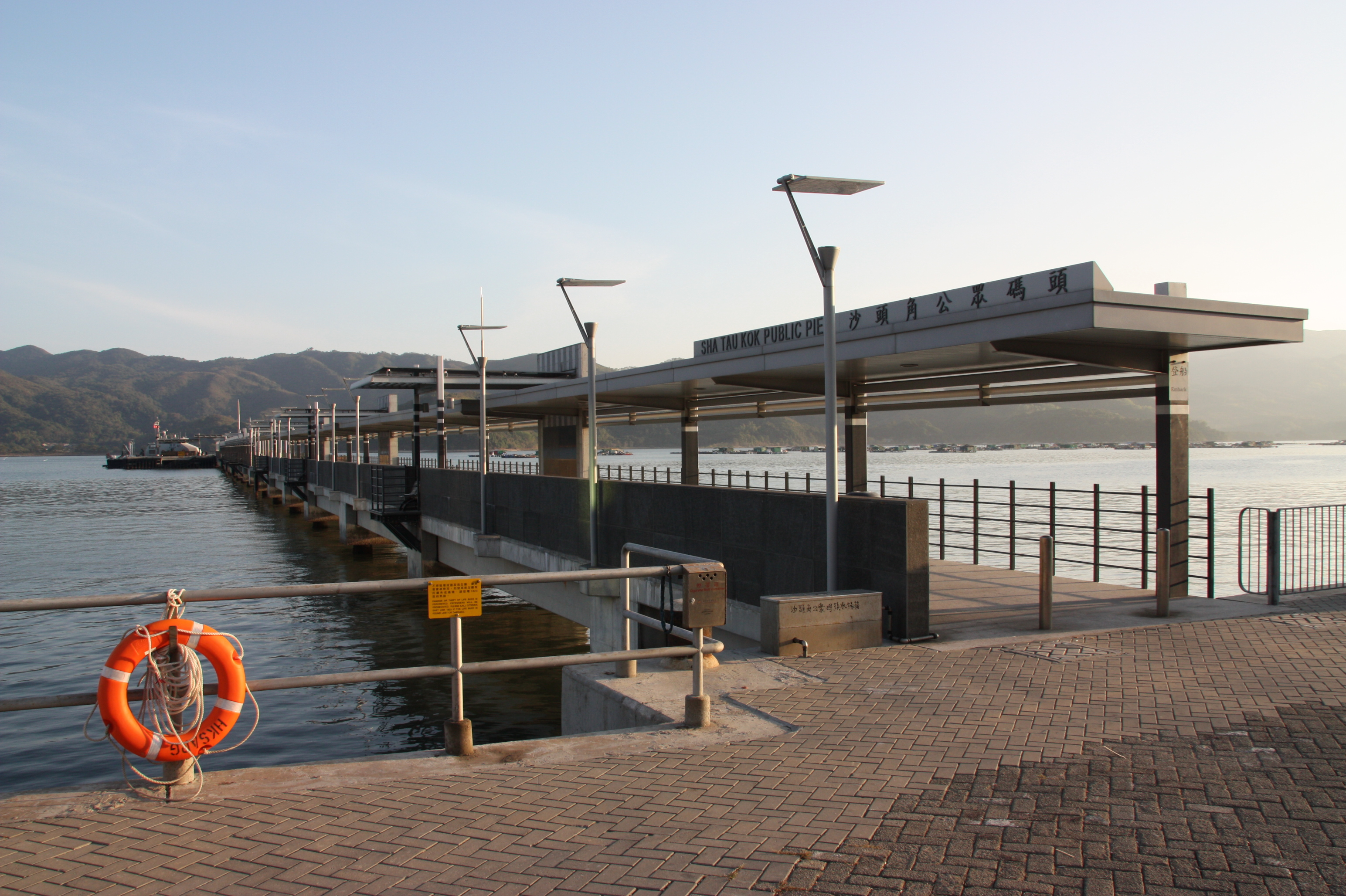
Sha Tau Kok Public Pier entrance

Sha Tau Kok Public Pier (Chinese: 沙頭角公眾碼頭) or Sha Tau Kok Pier (沙頭角碼頭) is a public pier in Sha Tau Kok, New Territories, Hong Kong. It is located at the easternmost land border between Hong Kong and Shenzhen, China, and lies to the west of the former Sha Tau Kok Public Pier.

The pier is used for loading and unloading goods and berthing of kaitos operating between Sha Tau Kok and Kat O, Sam A and other northeast rural areas. The original pier was built in the 1960s, but was replaced by a new one in 2007.

Sha Tau Kok Public Pier is within the Frontier Closed Area (FCA), and remained so even after the large reduction in the size of the FCA in 2008. The government maintains a policy of issuing Closed Area Permits to area non-residents only when they can demonstrate a "genuine need" to enter the area, such as for work, business, or visiting relatives within the area. The Security Bureau conducted discussions with local residents about opening the pier to public access for decades, but expressed concern that such opening might affect security along the boundary with mainland China. Accordingly, the general public could not make use of kaitos departing from the pier for purposes of tourism to islands in Mirs Bay, and instead had to take a much longer journey from Ma Liu Shui pier via Tolo Harbour. As part of the Northern Metropolis development strategy, the government proposed to open Sha Tau Kok Public Pier to tour groups starting from mid-2022.
