= Wong Ka Wai (Tuen Mun) =

Coordinates: 22.400105°N 113.979002°E

- Traditional Chinese: 黃家圍
- Simplified Chinese: 黄家围
Transcriptions
Standard Mandarin
- Hanyu Pinyin: Huáng Jiāwéi

Wong Ka Wai (Chinese: 黃家圍) is a village in Tuen Mun, Tuen Mun District, Hong Kong.

== Administration ==
Wong Ka Wai is a recognized village under the New Territories Small House Policy.

== History ==
Salt fields were historically farmed at Wong Ka Wai. Other salt fields were in Tai O on Lantau Island, San Hui in Tuen Mun, Yim Liu Ha in Sha Tau Kok, Yim Tin Tsai in Sai Kung and Yim Tin Tsai in Tai Po.

At the time of the 1911 census, the population of Wong Ka Wai was 50. The number of males was 20.
