= Yim Liu Ha =

Coordinates: 22.5448°N 114.2249°E

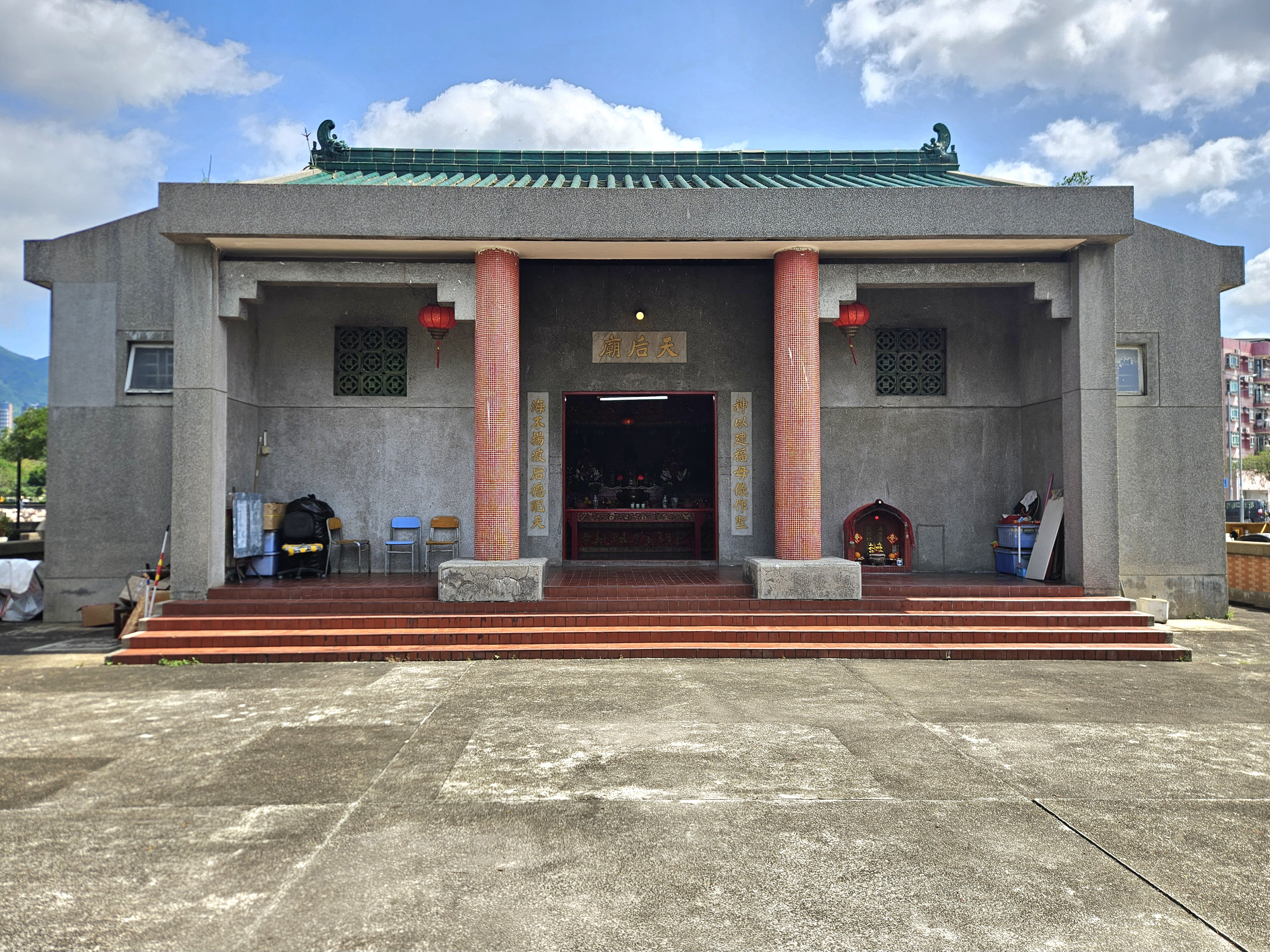
Tin Hau Temple in Yim Liu Ha

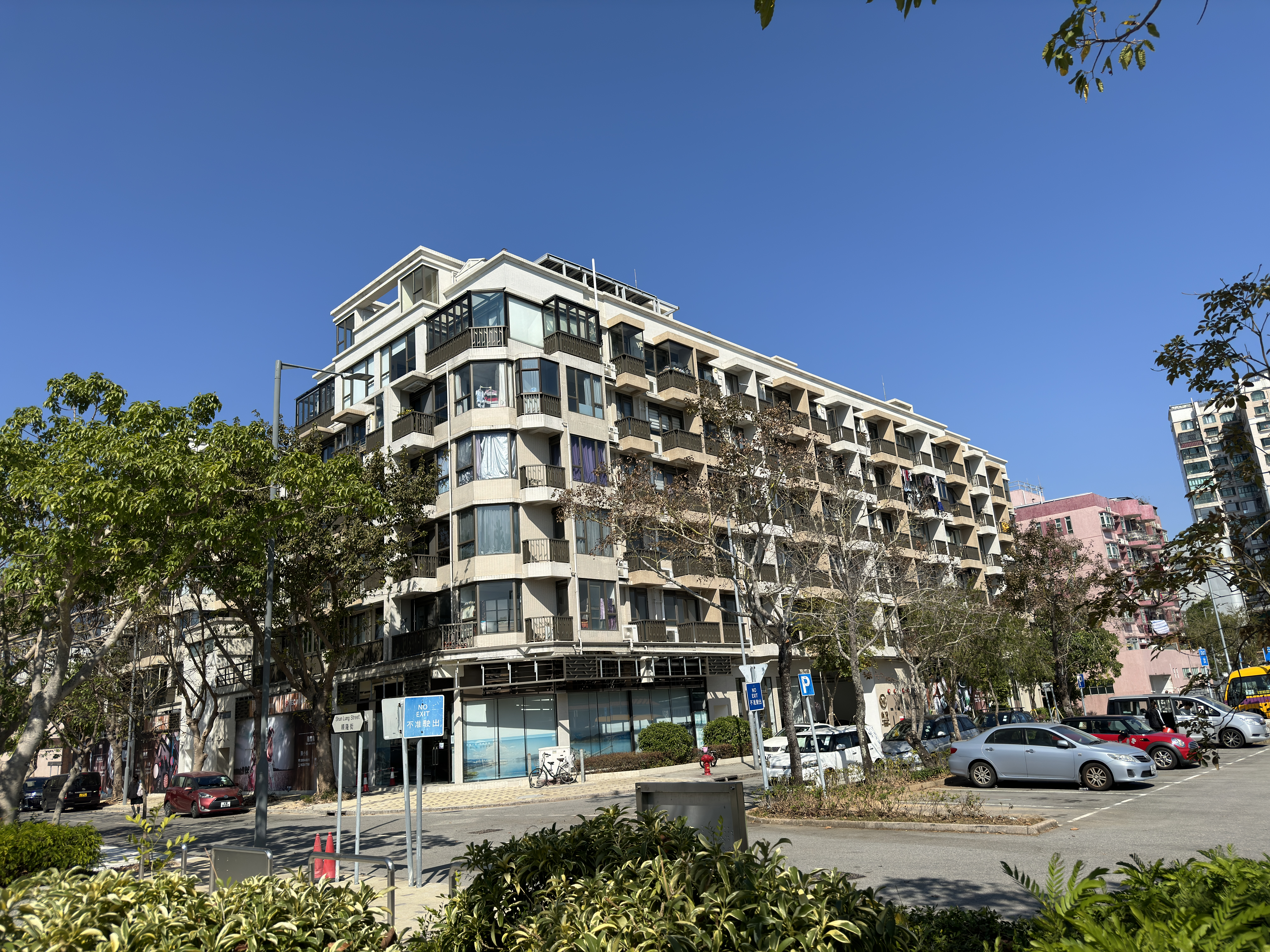
Yim Liu Ha

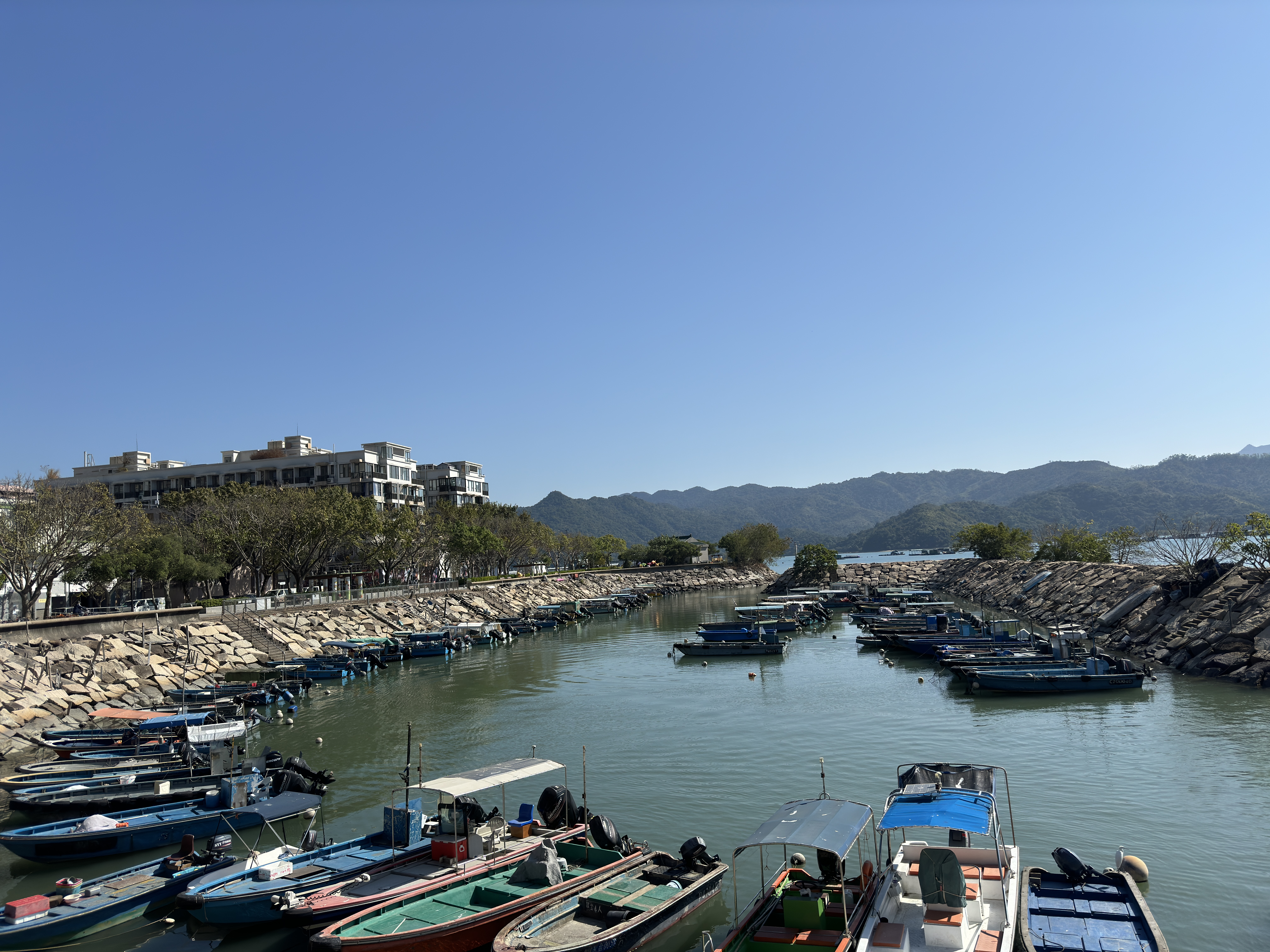
Typhoon shelter in Yim Liu Ha

Yim Liu Ha (Chinese: 鹽寮下) is an area part of Sha Tau Kok, in North District, Hong Kong.

== Administration ==
For electoral purposes, Yim Liu Ha is part of the Sha Ta constituency of the North District Council. It is currently represented by Ko Wai-kei, who was elected in the local elections.

== History ==
Salt fields were historically farmed at Yim Liu Ha as early as the Ming Dynasty. Other salt fields were in Tai O on Lantau Island, San Hui and Wong Ka Wai in Tuen Mun, Yim Tin Tsai in Sai Kung and Yim Tin Tsai in Tai Po.

Around 1898, Hoklo fishermen from Chaoyang, Jieyang and Shanwei moved to the Sha Tau Kok area and settled in Yim Liu Ha Village (鹽寮下村).

At the time of the 1911 census, the population of Yim Liu Ha was 47. The number of males was 29.

During the 1936 typhoon season of Hong Kong, the fishing boats anchored in Yim Liu Ha were damaged. The boat people repurposed the damaged boats by flipping them and using them as roofs for temporary housing.

During the 1960s, the boat population of Hoklo and Tanka origin had increased significantly in Yim Liu Ha. But in 1962 typhoon Wanda struck Hong Kong, sinking ships and forcing the boat population to resettle on land. Wooden huts were built, marking the start of Yim Liu Ha as a squatter village (Chinese: 寮屋區).

In 1988 the first stage of Sha Tau Kok Chuen was built, housing the people affected by the redevelopment of Sha Tau Kok such as the residents of Yim Liu Ha village. Squatter villages have since been demolished.
