= Sha Tau Kok =

Closed town in North District, Hong Kong

Sha Tau Kok 沙頭角 Sathewkok
- Closed town
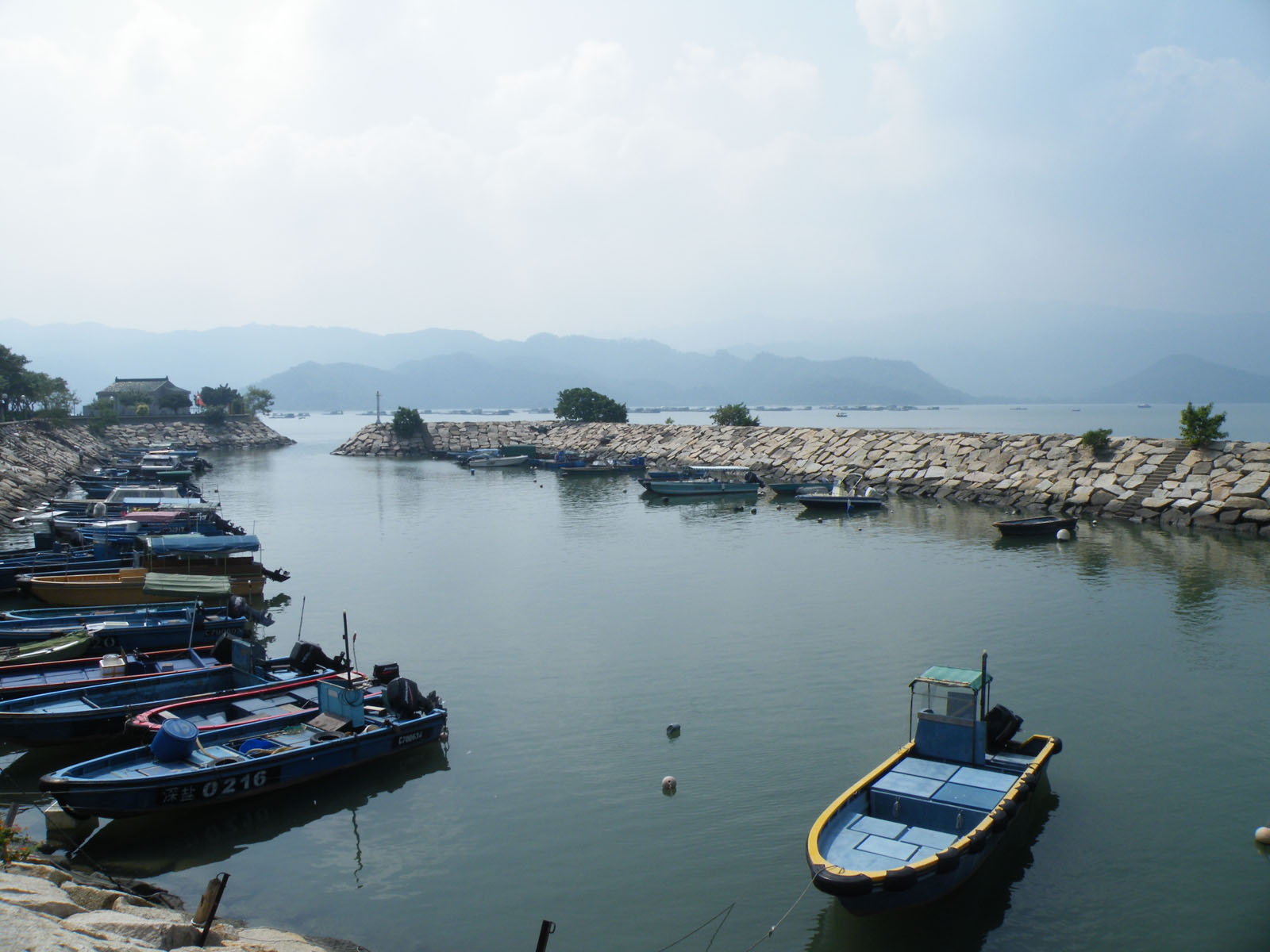
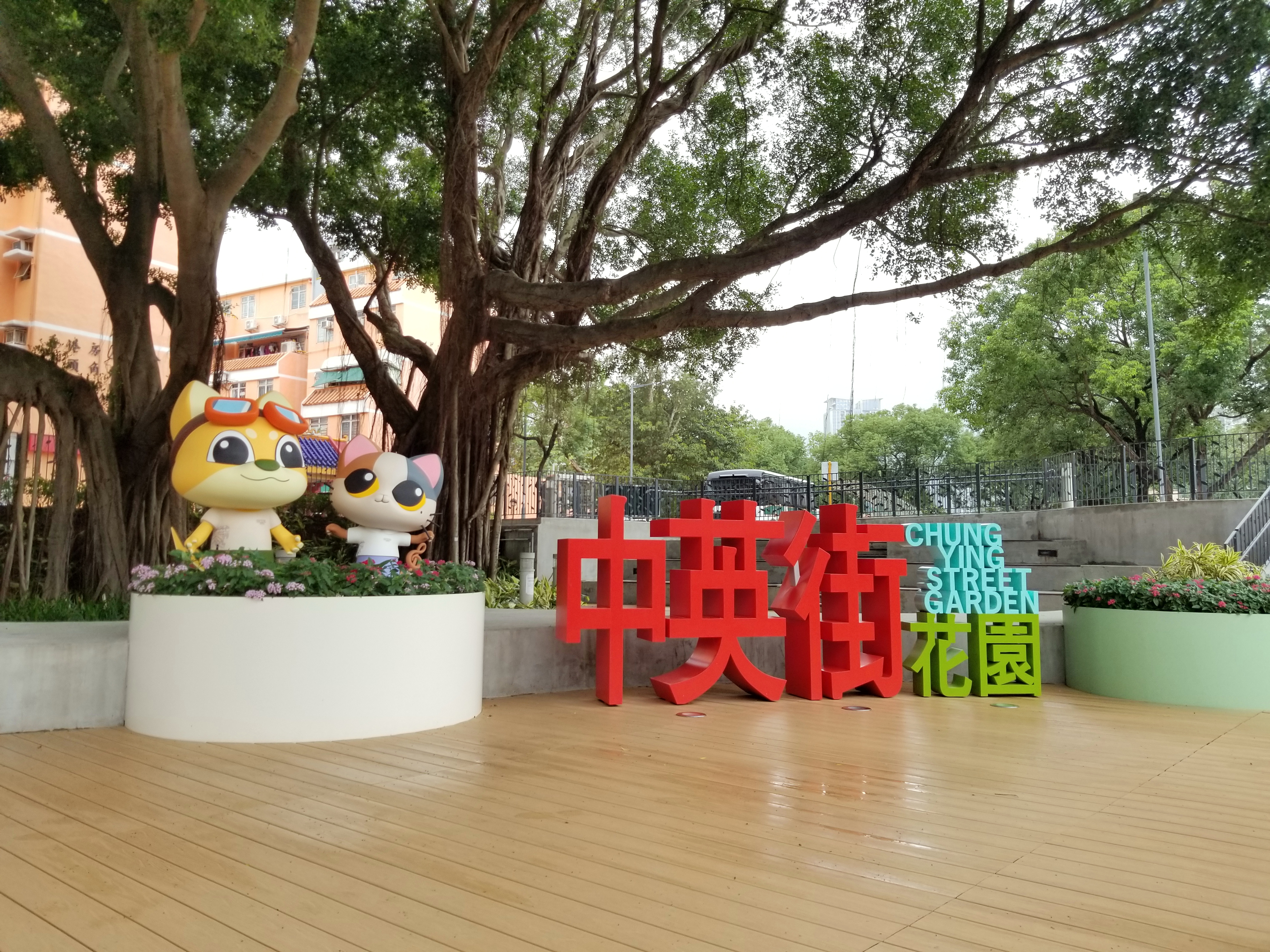
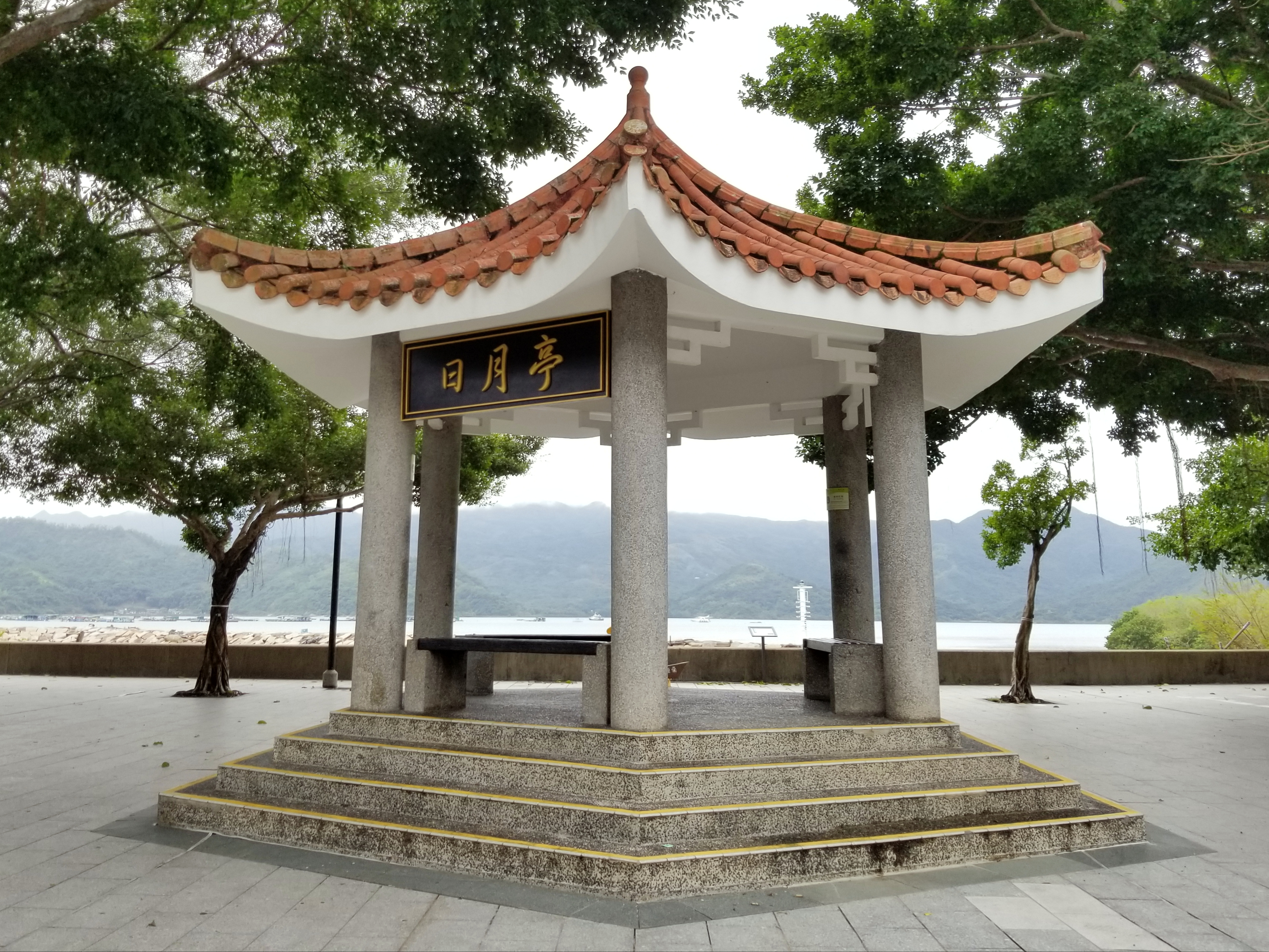
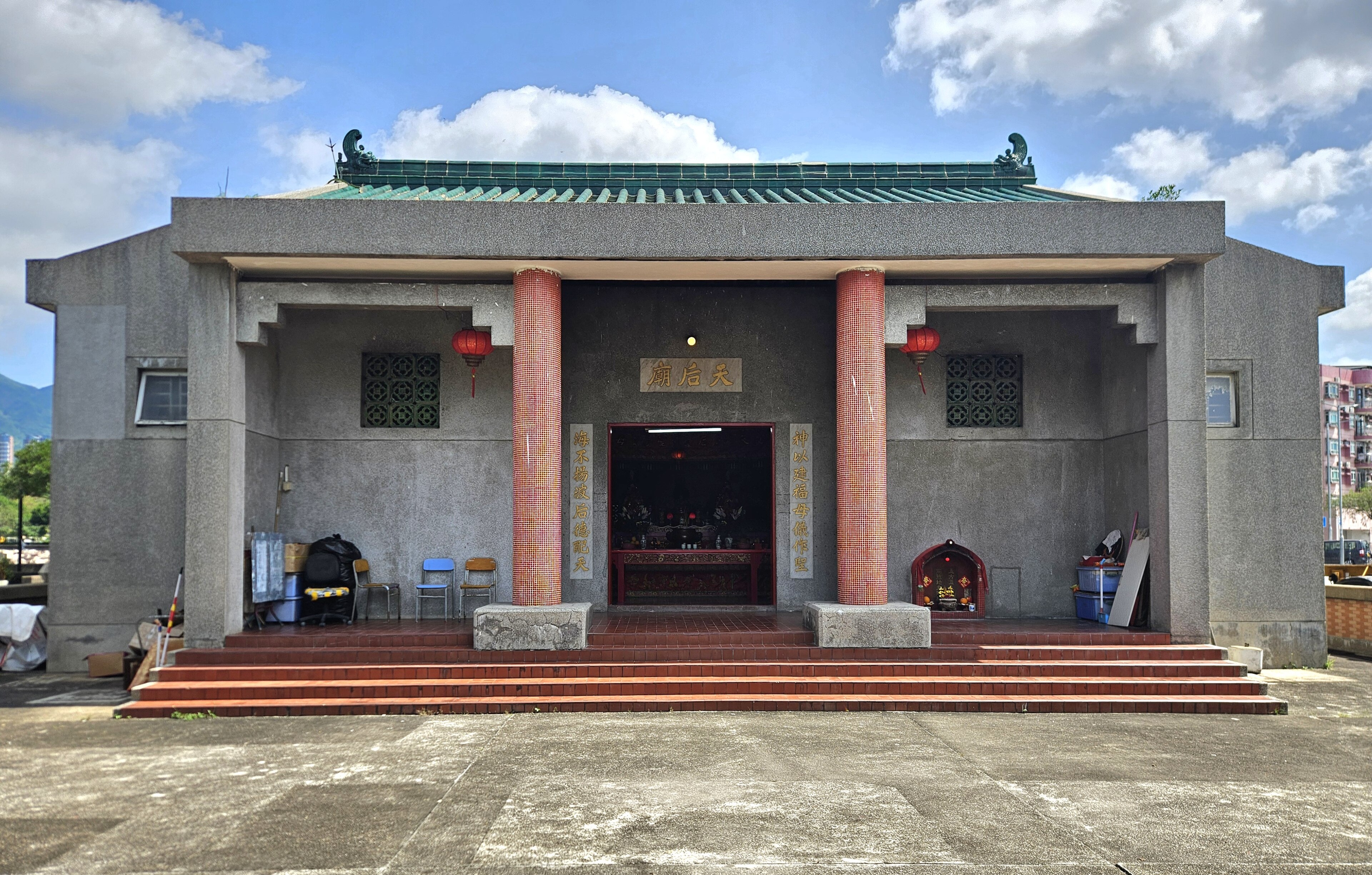
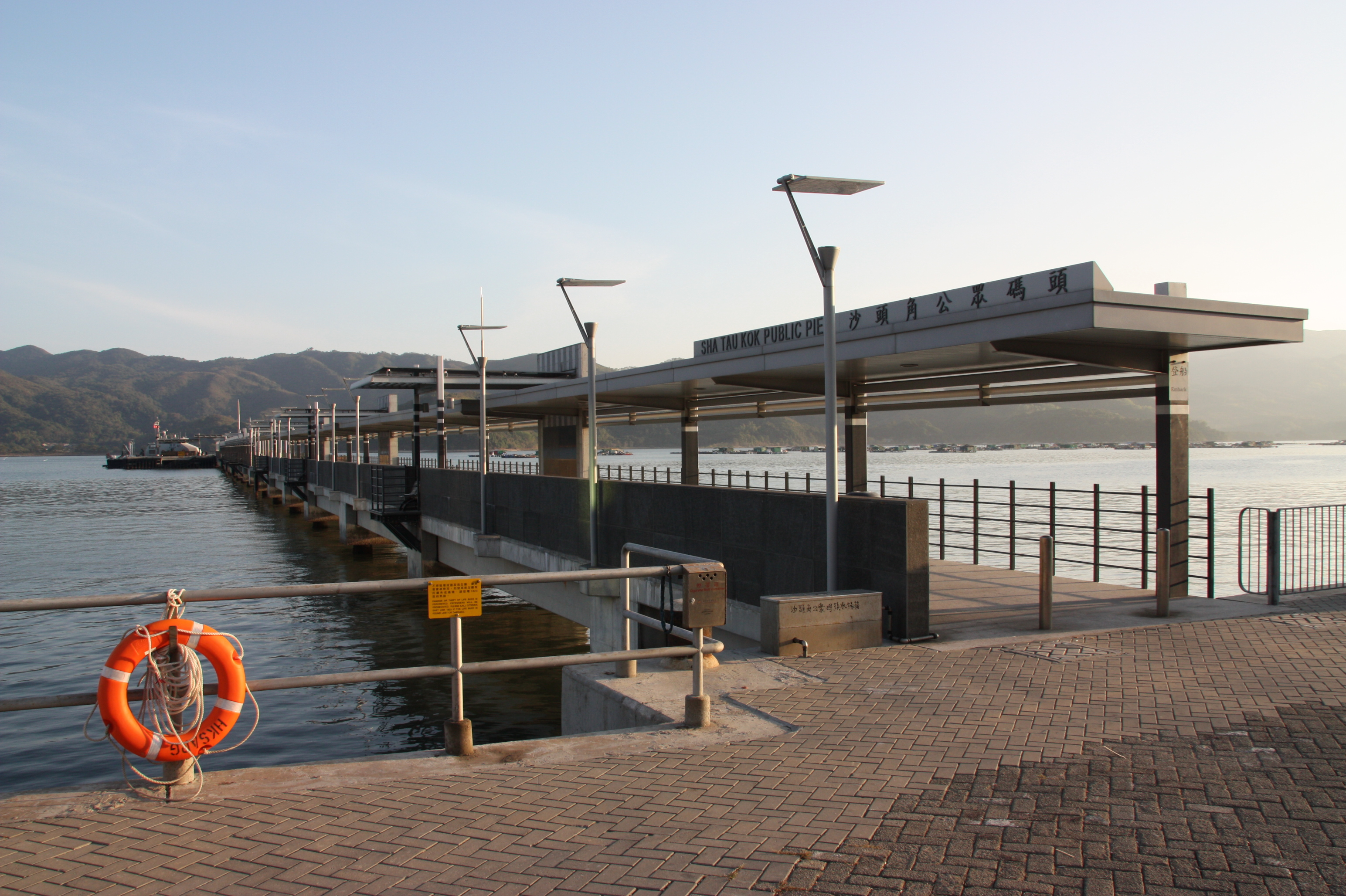
- Sha Tau Kok typhoon shelter Chung Ying Street Garden Sun and Moon Pavilion Tin Hau temple in Yim Liu Ha Sha Tau Kok Public Pier

- Location in Hong Kong
- Coordinates: 22°33′N 114°13′E
- Country: China
- Special administrative region: Hong Kong
- District: North District
- District council: North District Council

Population (2021 census)
  - Total: 4,056

Sha Tau Kok (Chinese: 沙頭角; Cantonese Yale: Sā Tàuh Gok) is a closed town in North District, Hong Kong. It is the last remaining major settlement in the Frontier Closed Area and is Hong Kong's northernmost town. Its residents are mostly descendants of Hakka farmers and Hoklo fishermen who settled the area as a consequence of the Qing dynasty's "Great Clearance" in the 17th century.

The town can be accessed via Sha Tau Kok Road and public transit beginning in Sheung Shui. However, visitors who do not possess a valid Closed Area Permit and identification are turned away at the police checkpoint guarding the entrance to the town. There are additional restrictions on access to Chung Ying Street, which separates the Hong Kong portion of Sha Tau Kok from the mainland Chinese portion in Shenzhen (Shatoujiao Subdistrict). Although the Hong Kong government now promotes tourism in the historically isolated town, Chung Ying Street remains closed off to most outsiders, including Hong Kong residents without permits.

== Etymology ==
Sha Tau Kok
- Traditional Chinese: 沙頭角
- Simplified Chinese: 沙头角
- Cantonese Yale: Sā Tàuh Gok
Transcriptions
Standard Mandarin
- Hanyu Pinyin: Shātóujiǎo
Hakka
- Romanization: sa^{1} tiu^{2} gok^{5}
Yue: Cantonese
- Yale Romanization: Sā Tàuh Gok
- Jyutping: saa^{1} tau^{4} gok^{3}

The English name Sha Tau Kok is transliterated from the Cantonese pronunciation of the Chinese name 沙頭角, which first appeared in the genealogy of the Ng (吳) Hakka clan of Sha Lan Ha (沙欄吓) in 1863. The Ngs of Sha Lan Ha wrote that Sha Tau Kok was originally the name of the bay. Italian Catholic missionary Simeone Volonteri labelled the northwestern part of Mirs Bay as Sha Tau Kok in his 1866 map of Sun On District. Sathewkok – a transliteration from Hakka Chinese – is sometimes used in English works relating to the Hakka people.

According to local legend, the name Sha Tau Kok is derived from a poem written by Qing officials when they inspected the area: "The sun rises from the beach (Sha Tau), the moon hangs above the cape (Kok)" (日出沙頭，月懸海角). The poem is written in red traditional Chinese characters on a stone tablet at the Cape of Sha Tau Kok, the town's easternmost point.

== History ==
=== Prehistory ===
Stone tools such as hammers, pounders, axes, and adzes dating to the Neolithic period were excavated from San Tsuen, Sha Tau Kok, in 2001. Pottery dating to the Han dynasty was also found there.

=== 17th–18th century ===
Not much is known about settlements in the area before the Qing dynasty (1644–1912). The provincial imperial government expressed interest in the Mirs Bay area because of its salt flats and pearl beds, in the 5th century and 8th century, respectively.

The "Great Clearance" of the 17th century expelled most of the area's original settlers, who immigrated to locations such as present-day Yuen Long and Shenzhen. At the same time, the first Hakka settlers of Sha Tau Kok arrived to settle the northern shoreline of Mirs Bay, with more Hakka villages being established in the 18th century.

=== 19th century ===
The Sam Heung village alliance (三鄉; 'Alliance of Three Villages') occupied the original shoreline of Sha Tau Kok, which was called Tai Tan Tung (大坦洞). The three villages included Shan Tsui, Tong To, and Tam Shui Hang.

During the early 1800s, five wealthy villages – Shan Tsui, Tam Shui Hang, Wo Hang, Nam Chung, and Luk Keng – invested in the reclamation of Sha Tau Kok to provide more farmland for the growing population.

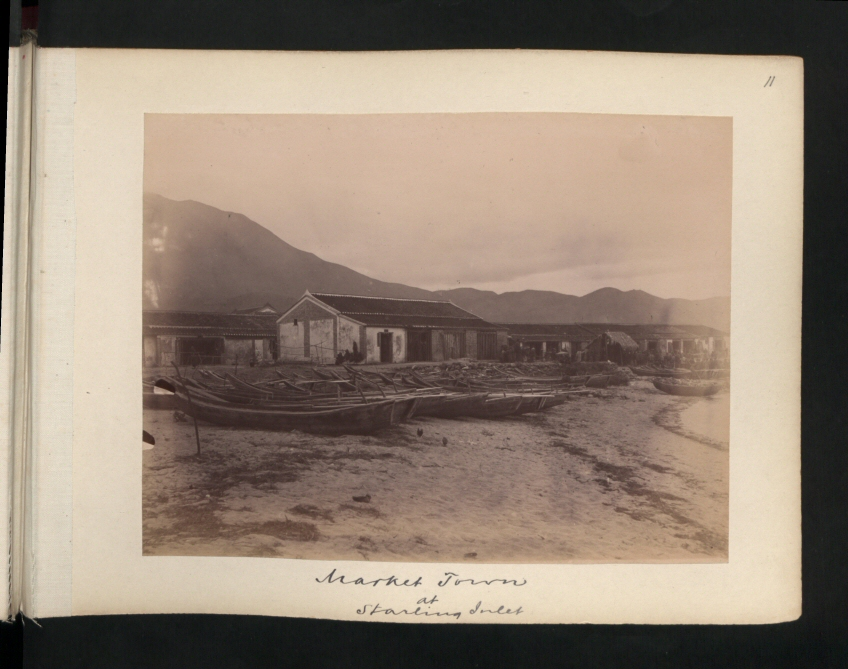
Tung Wo Market in 1898

Around the 1830s, leaders from 10 or so villages formed an alliance called the Shap Yeuk (十約) to establish a new market at the newly reclaimed Sha Lan Ha, that would allow the Sha Tau Kok area to operate independently from older markets in Shenzhen. The market was later named Tung Wo Market (東和墟; 'Eastern Peace Market') and described in 1848 by Basel missionary Theodore Hamberg as "a great market, quite given over to trade, newly built, and bustling with business". In the 1850s there were approximately 50 shops.

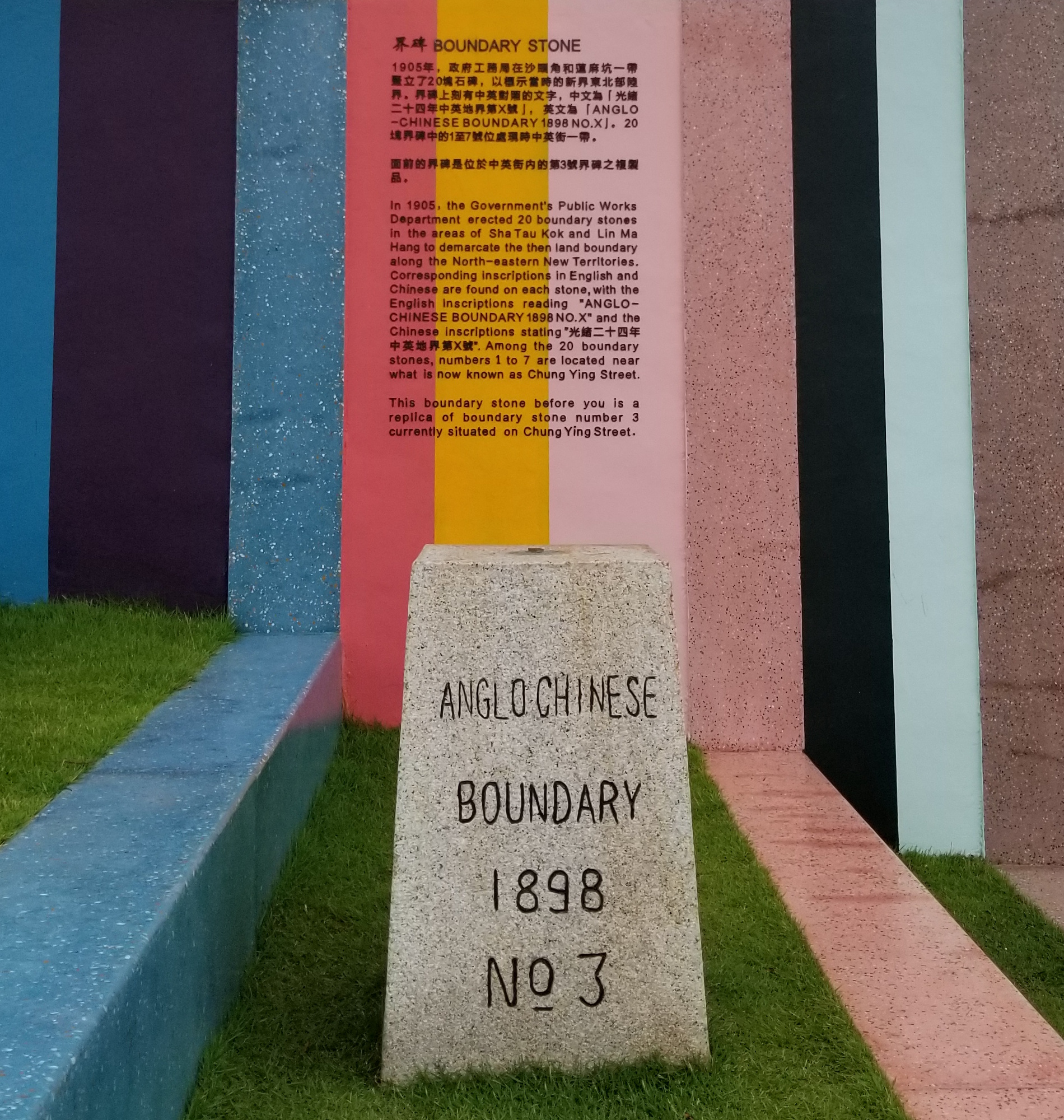
Replica of a boundary stone used to demarcate the border between British Hong Kong and Qing China

As a result of the Convention for the Extension of Hong Kong Territory, Sha Tau Kok was leased to the British in 1898. Within the lease, Tung Wo Market was not included, leading to the problem of shopkeepers in Tung Wo being cut off from their ancestral villages in Hong Kong. On 19 April 1899, the elders of Shap Yeuk petitioned the district magistrate and begged that the lease not go forward, fearing excessive taxation and practical problems if they lived in British territory while their market was in Chinese territory. This petition failed to change the lease, leading to a host of problems in the 20th century which led to the decline of Tung Wo Market.

=== 20th century ===
At the time of the 1911 government census, the population of Sha Tau Kok District was 8,570, while the population of Sha Tau Kok Village (British territory) was 14. The census recorded that, at home, 95.5% of the population spoke Hakka, 4.0% Cantonese ("Punti"), and 0.5% Hoklo (Hokkien). (Note: The exact boundary of Sha Tau Kok District and Sha Tau Kok village during the 1911 census is unknown. However, the modern district encompasses 46 villages under the List Of Recognised Villages Under The Small House Policy.)

The present-day area of Sha Tau Kok Chuen and Yim Liu Ha was at that time covered with marshes and salt fields. A sizeable Hoklo population worked at those salt fields; they were the largest community of Hoklo speakers in the North District. The total population of Sha Tau Kok District was 8,357 in 1921, growing to 8,941 in 1931. (Note: As defined by the area of Sha Tau Kok Police District) During the 1920s, there were around a hundred shops in Tung Wo Market, with some moving across the border to San Lau Street.

==== Battle of Hong Kong and Japanese occupation ====
During the Battle of Hong Kong in 1941, a regiment of Japanese troops entered Hong Kong through Sha Tau Kok. The Sha Tau Kok Anti-Japanese War Memorial Hall, originally built in 1930 as a residence, was converted to a museum for "patriotic education."

==== 1967 Hong Kong riots ====
On 8 July 1967, amid the 1967 Hong Kong riots, several hundred demonstrators from the People's Republic of China (mainland China), including members of the People's Militia, crossed the border at Sha Tau Kok and attacked the police post there. The police attempted to disperse the crowd using tear gas and wooden bullets. They then came under fire from several points, including automatic fire from Chinese territory, prompting an exchange of gunfire. Five police officers were killed and eleven were injured. Gunfire stopped with the arrival of a battalion from the British garrison.

=== 21st century ===
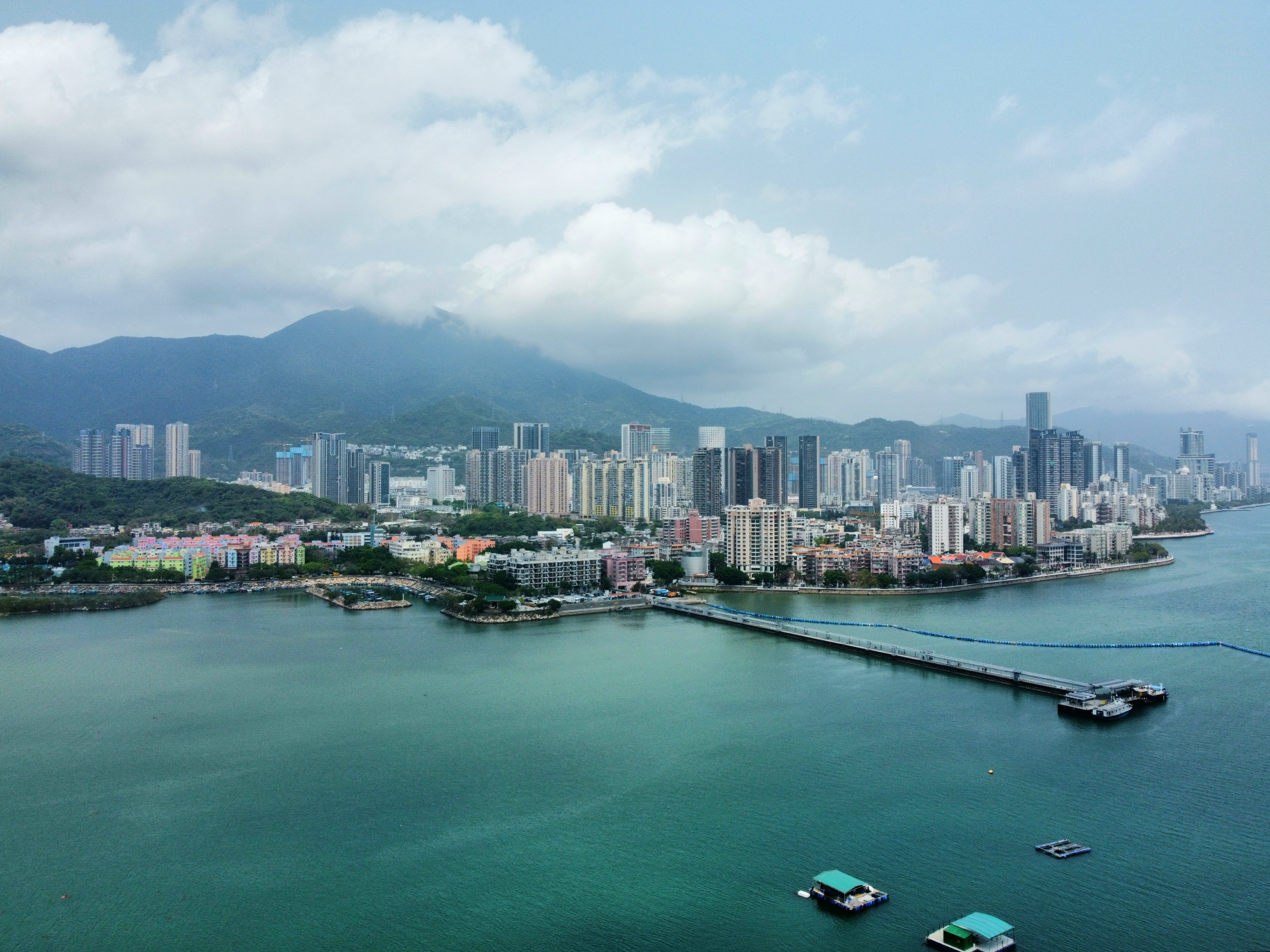
Sha Tau Kok, Hong Kong (left), and Shatoujiao, Shenzhen (right), in 2024

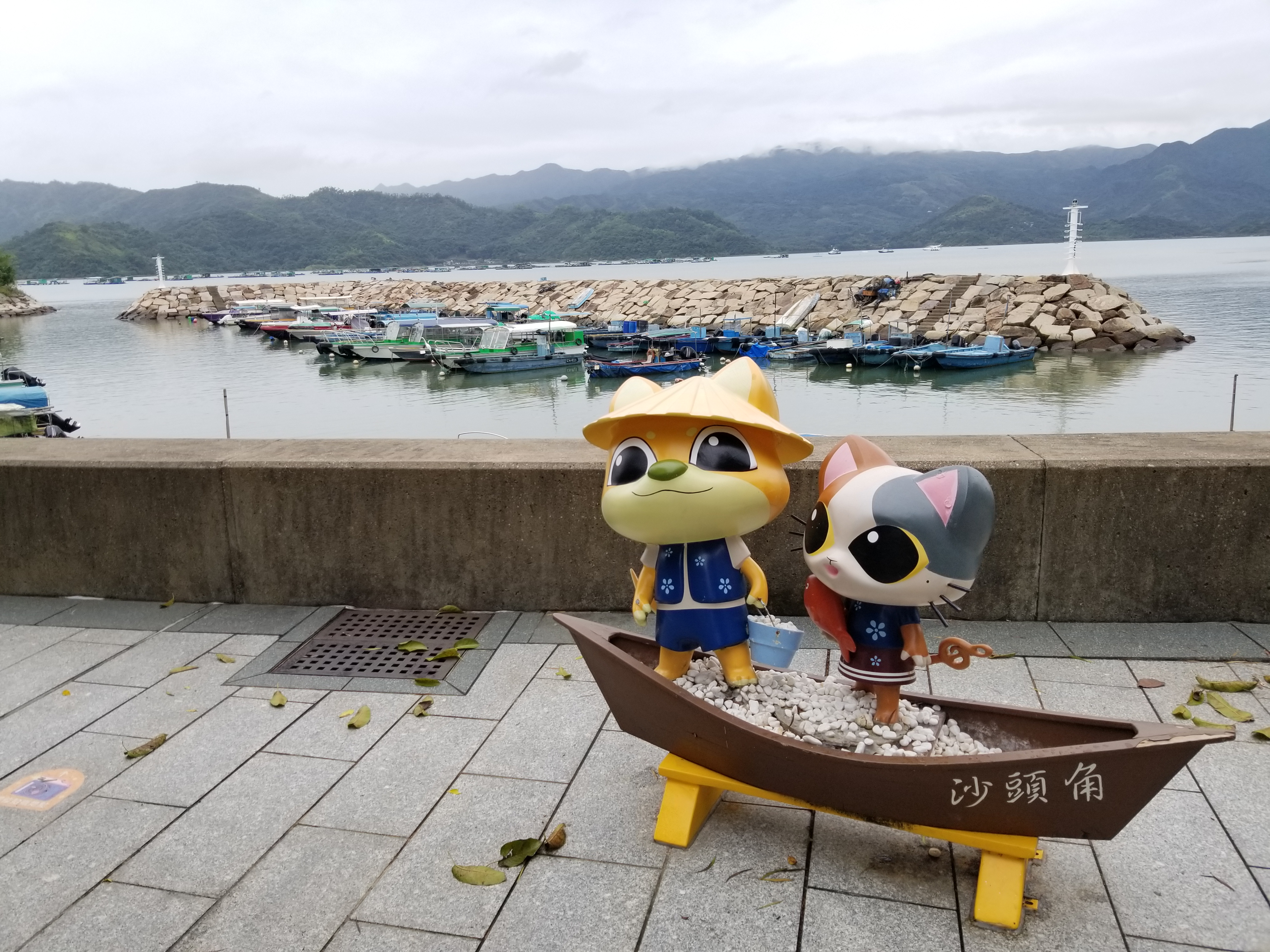
Enggie Pup and Arttie Kitty, mascots of the Hong Kong government's Leisure and Cultural Services Department, in front of the Sha Tau Kok typhoon shelter in 2024

In 2022, the Hong Kong government announced a pilot scheme in which limited areas of the town would be opened to tourists. The following year, the government announced it was working on a feasibility study to redevelop the town's border control point with mainland China.

As of December 2025, a daily quota of 2,300 individual visitors and 700 group visitors are permitted to visit Sha Tau Kok on weekends and holidays, with no limits on weekdays. Visitors must possess a Tourism Closed Area Permit, and individual travellers are only allowed to enter the area by public transport. Although tourists can visit most parts of Sha Tau Kok, Chung Ying Street remains off limits. Although some residents are supportive of the opening up, the move has also led to concern from some residents that tourists might affect the historically closed community.

== Geography ==
Located within the Mirs Bay area, Sha Tau Kok is located on the northern shoreline of Starling Inlet, 10 km northeast of Fanling. The town centre is by the sea and the northern part of the town encompasses the hill known as Yuen Tuen Shan (元墩山).

The Cape of Sha Tau Kok (沙頭角之角) is the easternmost point of Sha Tau Kok. It is the location of a sign and stone stone tablet; the sign displays the cape's coordinates, while the Chinese text on the tablet is a poem which translates to "The sun rises from the beach (Sha Tau), the moon hangs above the cape (Kok)" (日出沙頭，月懸海角).

A section of Starling Inlet located offshore of Sha Tau Kok is one of the 26 designated marine fish culture zones in Hong Kong.

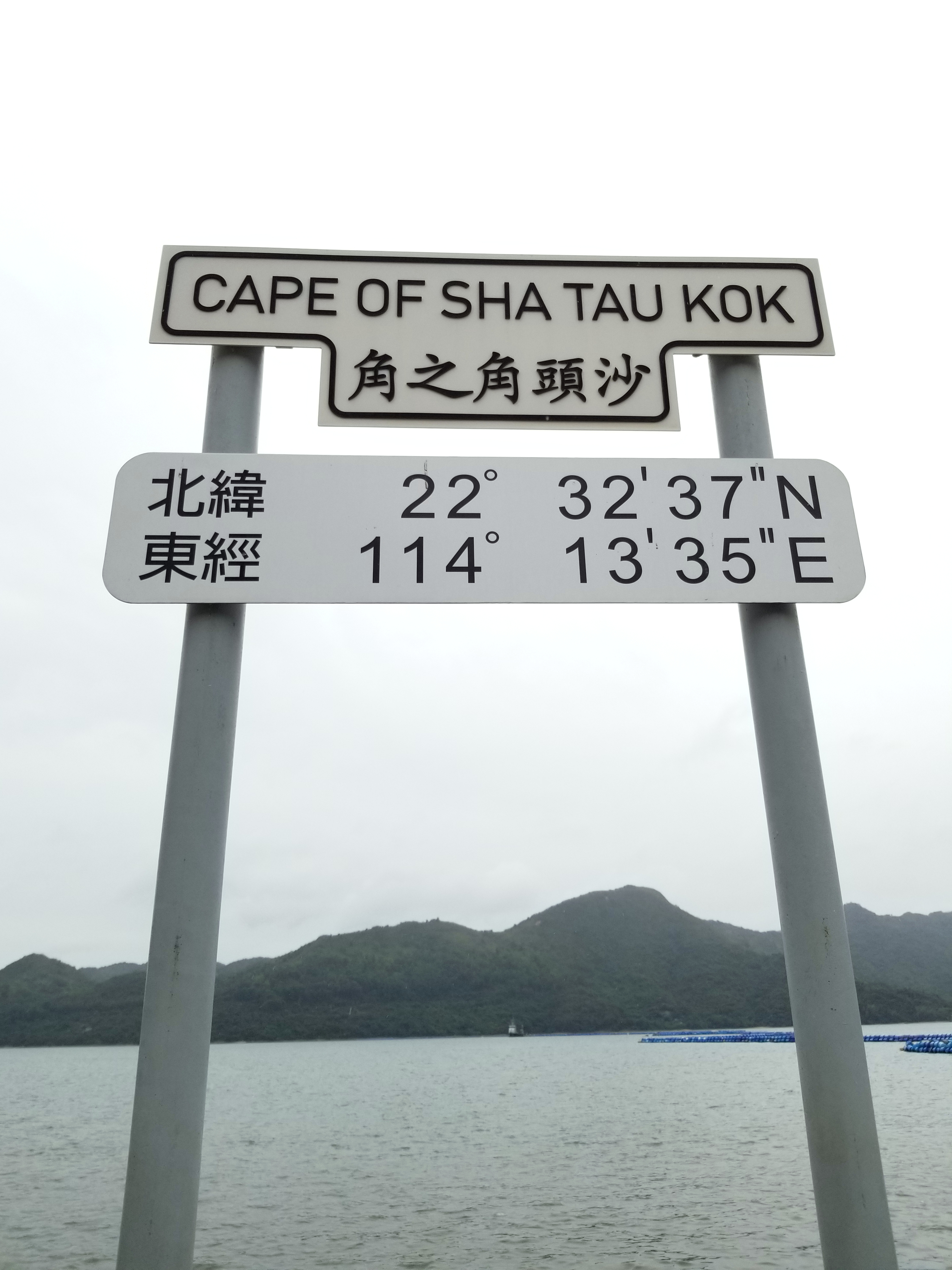
Cape of Sha Tau Kok sign

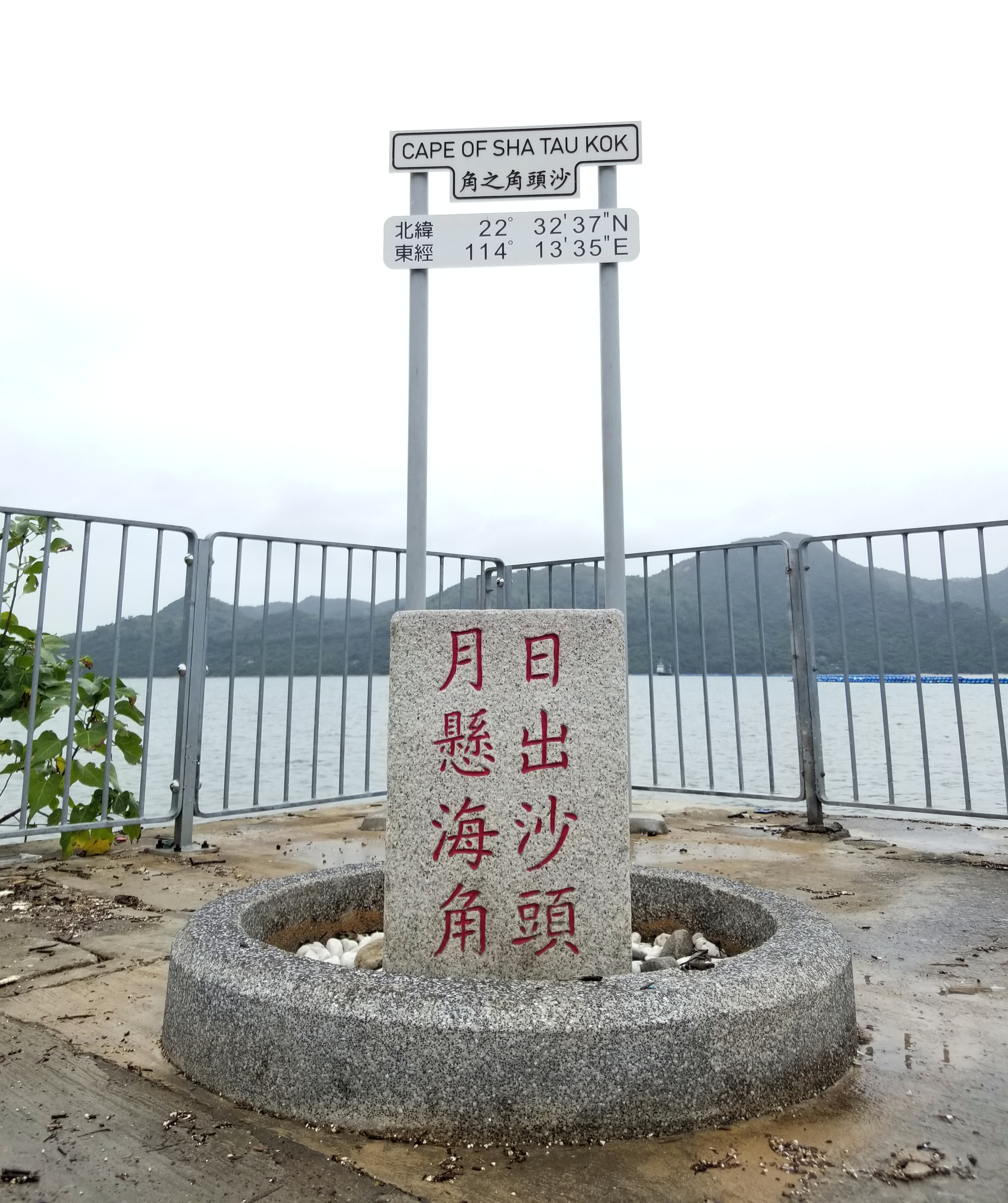
Cape of Sha Tau Kok sign and stone tablet

== Border with mainland China ==
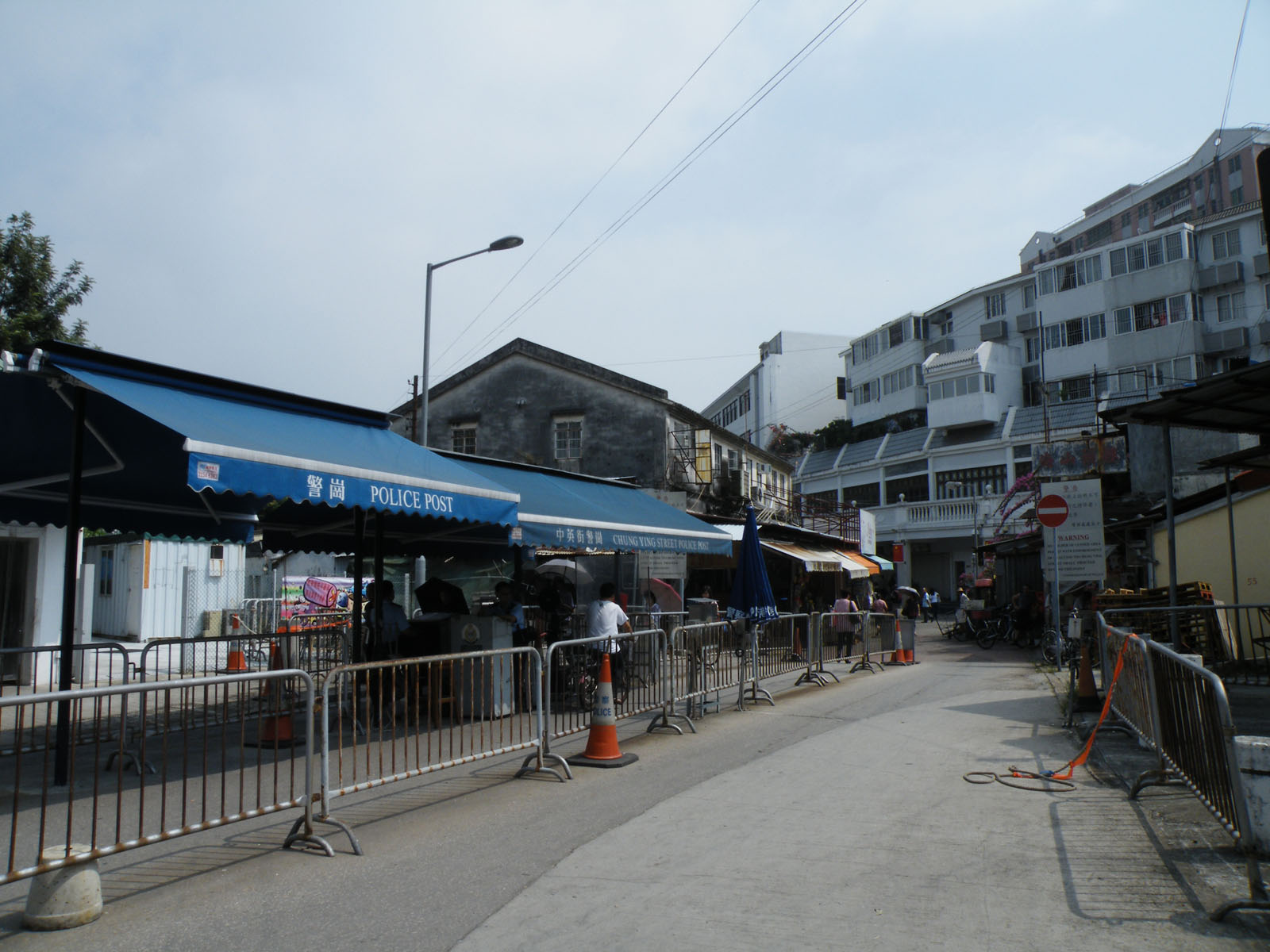
The Chung Ying Street border crossing in 2011

Sha Tau Kok Control Point is one of Hong Kong's border crossings along the geographical land border between Hong Kong and Shenzhen. The others are Man Kam To Control Point, Lo Wu Control Point, Lok Ma Chau Control Point, Lok Ma Chau Spur Line Control Point, Heung Yuen Wai Control Point and Shenzhen Bay Control Point.

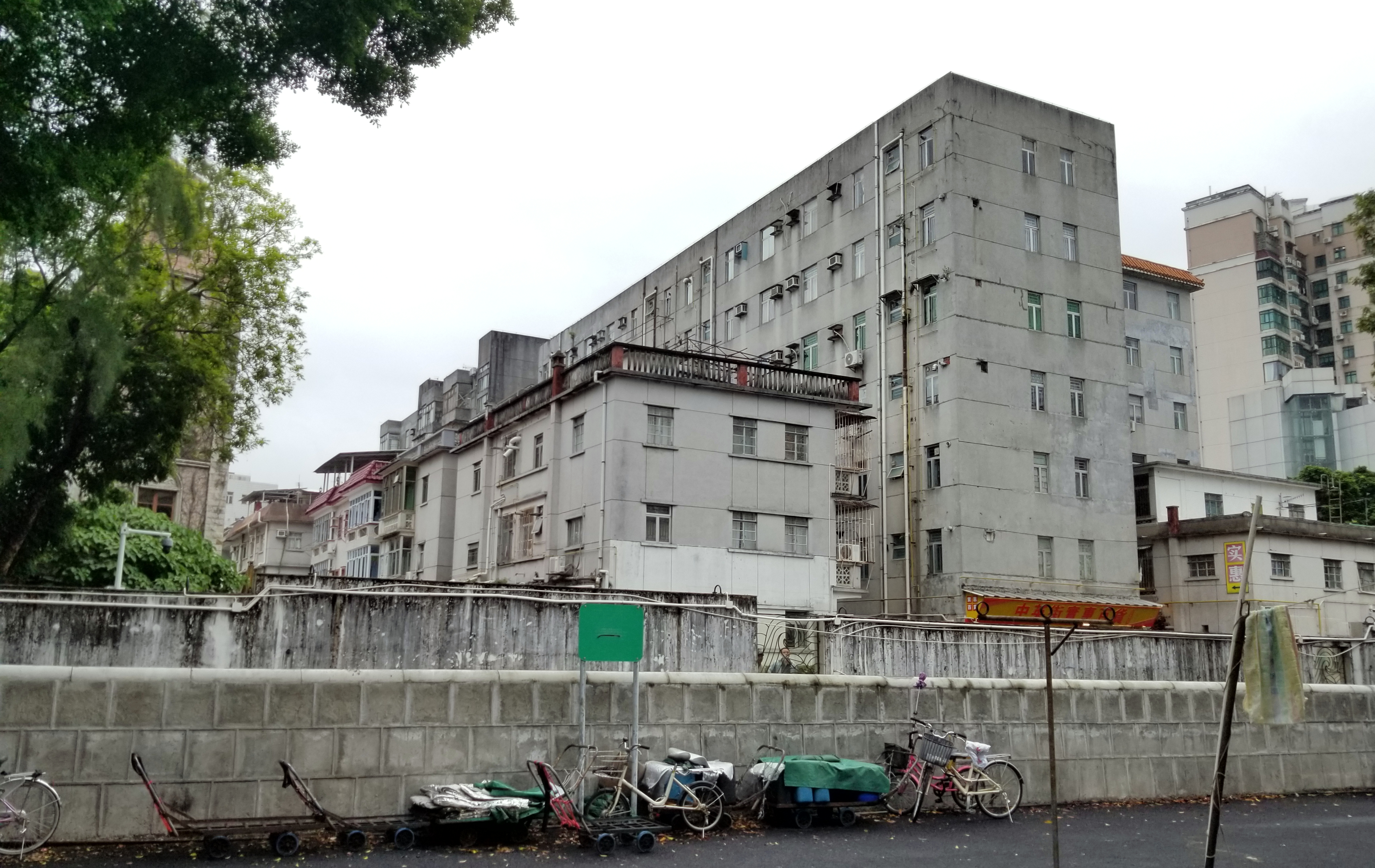
The Sha Tau Kok–Shatoujiao border wall as seen from San Lau Street in Sha Tau Kok

Sha Tau Kok is bordered by the Shatoujiao Subdistrict of Shenzhen; Shatoujiao is the pinyin romanisation of 沙頭角, while Sha Tau Kok is the Hong Kong Government Cantonese Romanisation. A border wall separates what was formerly one town, with Chung Ying Street being the only unwalled section of the Sha Tau Kok–Shatoujiao border. Before the implementation of the "open door" policy in the 1980s, both sides exercised strict control over cross-boundary activities on the street. Even in the present day, non-residents must have a permit to visit Chung Ying Street.

After the "open door" policy was put in place to allow freer travel between the two sides, mainland Chinese travellers flocked to Chung Ying Street to purchase goods unavailable in mainland China for personal use. However, it simultaneously became a notorious point of goods trafficking, attracting businessmen and unemployed individuals looking to capitalise on the market opportunities created by the policy. Hawking and touting, smuggling, unlawful import and export of goods, and illegal employment became prominent on Chung Ying Street.

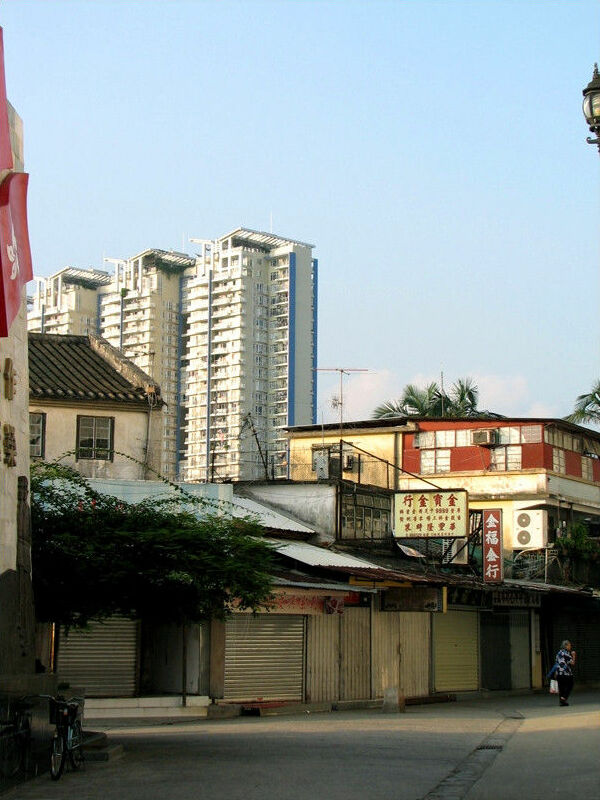
Chung Ying Street with high rise buildings in Shatoujiao in the background

Traffickers would enter Chung Ying Street with visitor permits, some making several trips a day acquiring goods and abusing the custom tariff limits on goods such as baby formula, soaps, electronics, and fabrics. These traffickers would then unload their burden to collect their pay inside Shatoujiao, or sell further inland in the mainland for greater profits. Although there are a lot of goods leaving Hong Kong from Sha Tau Kok via Chung Ying Street, there is also an inflow of foodstuffs and other commodities that come through from China into Hong Kong throughout the day, only limited by the closure of the Chinese customs post.

A variety of items have been smuggled through the border. In 1996, 2,511 kilograms of raw uninspected meat was seized in a single case. In 1997, counterfeit trademarked clothes and imported garments without licence valued at over $4.5 million were seized. Live chickens, pirated CDs, animal products of protected species as pangolins, owls, eagles and tigers have also been seized. Attempted drugs trafficking is common to the present day, with cocaine, methamphetamine, and cannabis being intercepted at the Sha Tau Kok border. Illegally imported pet animals such as cats and dogs, are also common.

The control point of access to Shenzhen is located northwest of the hill in Shan Tsui (山咀). It is possible to travel into Shatoujiao on the China side, via the Sha Tau Kok border. A dedicated coach line, the Sha Tau Kok express (沙頭角快線), runs at a regular schedule from Sheung Shui MTR station, Fan Ling MTR station, Kowloon Tong, and Yau Ma Tei. Travellers are taken through the Shek Chung Au (石涌凹) border checkpoint without a permit search, then head directly to the Sha Tau Kok Control Point. There, passengers disembark, go through customs, and have their documents processed, before reboarding the coach to be driven to the mainland border immigration checkpoint. There, they disembark and take all their belongings through the mainland Chinese customs and again have their documents processed. Travellers from outside China are advised to obtain entry visas from the appropriate authorities, or via a travel agent before attempting the entry. Hong Kong residents of Chinese nationality should hold Home Return Permits for entry into China.

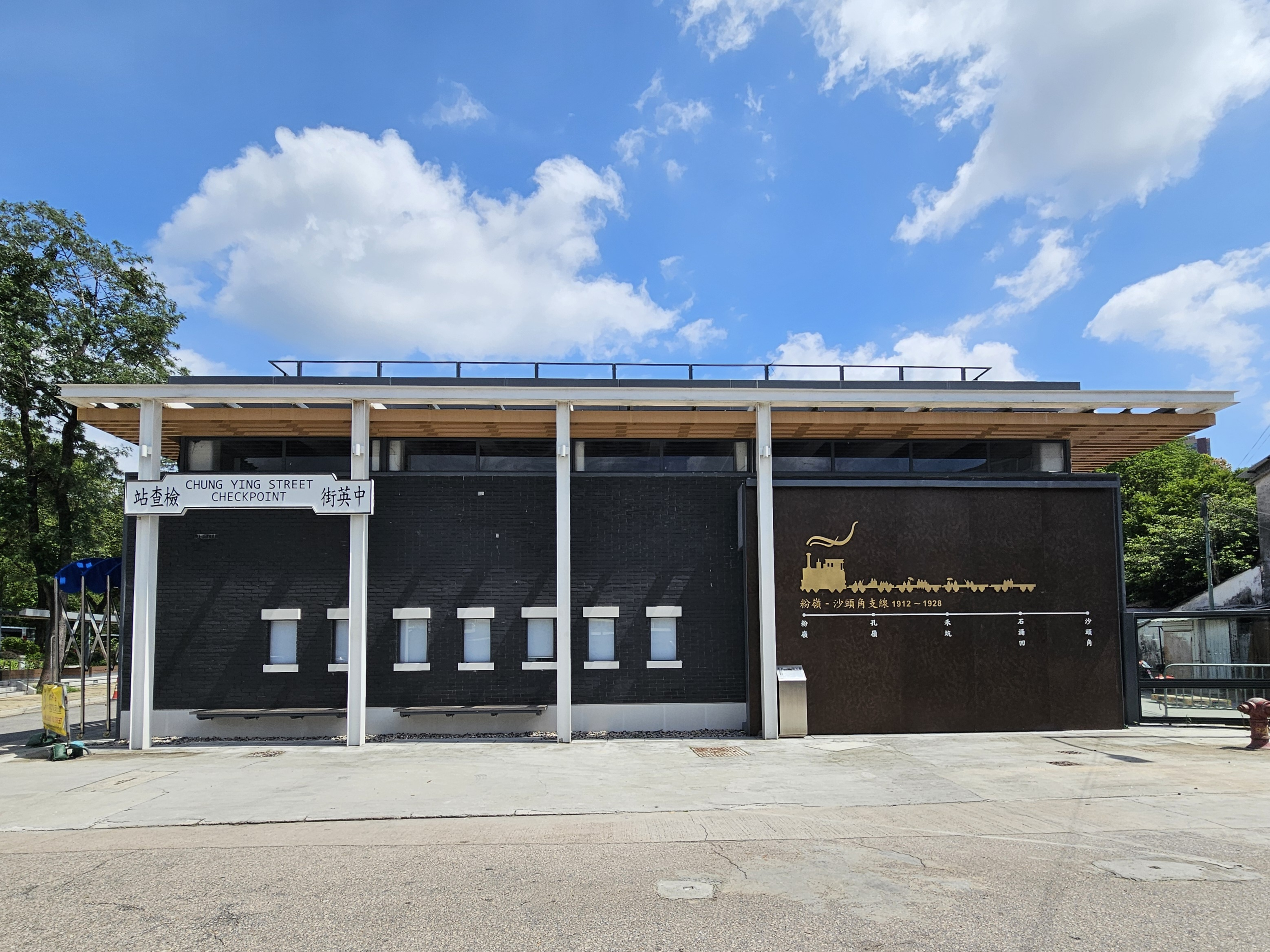
The Chung Ying Street checkpoint building

The Chung Ying Street checkpoint building was opened on 23 December 2024.

== Public housing ==
Sha Tau Kok Chuen is a public housing estate within the Sha Tau Kok Closed Area built to accommodate the residents affected by the clearance of the area. It consists of 51 low-rise blocks completed in 1988, 1989 and 1991, and it is the public housing estate with the most number of blocks in Hong Kong.

== Demographics ==
Most residents are descendent from Hakka-farming or Hoklo-fishing backgrounds. As both farming and fishing have declined in the past few decades, better-educated young people tend to move out to live and work in urban areas and overseas. However, older villagers remain, most of whom live in Sha Tau Kok Chuen or in nearby villages. Many working families return to visit on the weekends, during festivals or on holidays to attend ceremonies, such as the deity-thanking ceremony at the Tin Hau temple in Yim Liu Ha.

As of the 2021 census, Sha Tau Kok has a population of 4,056 people. The male-to-female ratio is about 1.19, i.e. 835 females for every 1,000 males. The median age is 46.7 years old. The median monthly household income is HK$27,650.

== Government ==
Sha Tau Kok District is a rural committee district encompassing 46 villages within North District.

== Education ==
Sha Tau Kok is in Primary One Admission (POA) School Net 83. Within the school net are two aided schools (operated independently but funded with government money): Fuk Tak Education Society Primary School (formerly the Shan Tsui Public School) and Sha Tau Kok Central Primary School. No government schools are in the net. In 2013, 90% of the roughly 200 students were Hong Kong residents living in Shenzhen. Other schools include Kwan Ah School, Sha Tau Kok Central Primary School, and Tai Wah Public School.

Hong Kong Public Libraries operates the Sha Tau Kok Public Library in Sha Tau Kok Chuen.

== Transportation ==
Before there were roads to access Sha Tau Kok, a branch of the Kowloon–Canton Railway (KCR), Sha Tau Kok Railway, served as the town's main transport. Completed in 1912, this service had three stops, linking Fanling Station to Sha Tau Kok Station. It was built from the original narrow gauge of the KCR British Section, and later replaced by standard gauge. After Sha Tau Kok Road was completed, the Sha Tau Kok Railway and its terminus ceased operations on 1 April 1928. The area formerly occupied by the terminus is still known colloquially as "train station terminus" (火車頭).

Currently, there are both Kowloon Motor Bus and minibus services in Sha Tau Kok. The town has a bus terminus served by the KMB route 78K service as well as the smaller sixteen-seater minibus or public light bus service route number 55K. Both begin in Sheung Shui and pass through Luen Wo Hui before terminating at Sha Tau Kok. Travelers can also board the KMB route 277A from Lam Tin station to Sha Tau Kok. Alternatively, visitors can also travel by taxi. However, passengers will not be allowed to proceed through the Closed Area border checkpoint if they do not carry a valid permit. Police personnel will board the bus at the checkpoint to check the identification documents and the required Frontier Closed Area permit of each passenger. If passengers do not possess these documents, they will be asked to leave by police personnel.

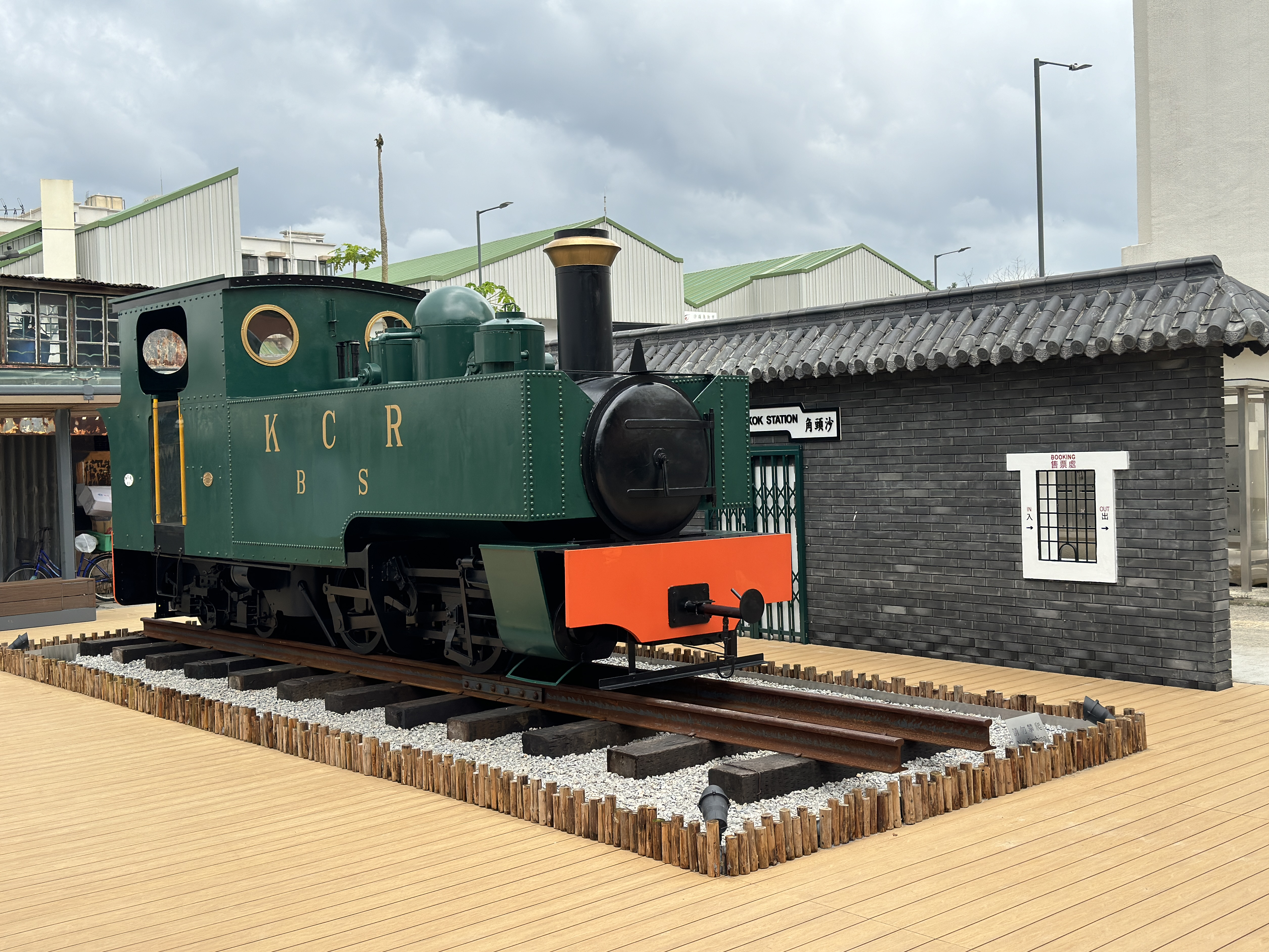
Replicas of the Sha Tau Kok Station facade and a KCR train in Chung Ying Street Garden

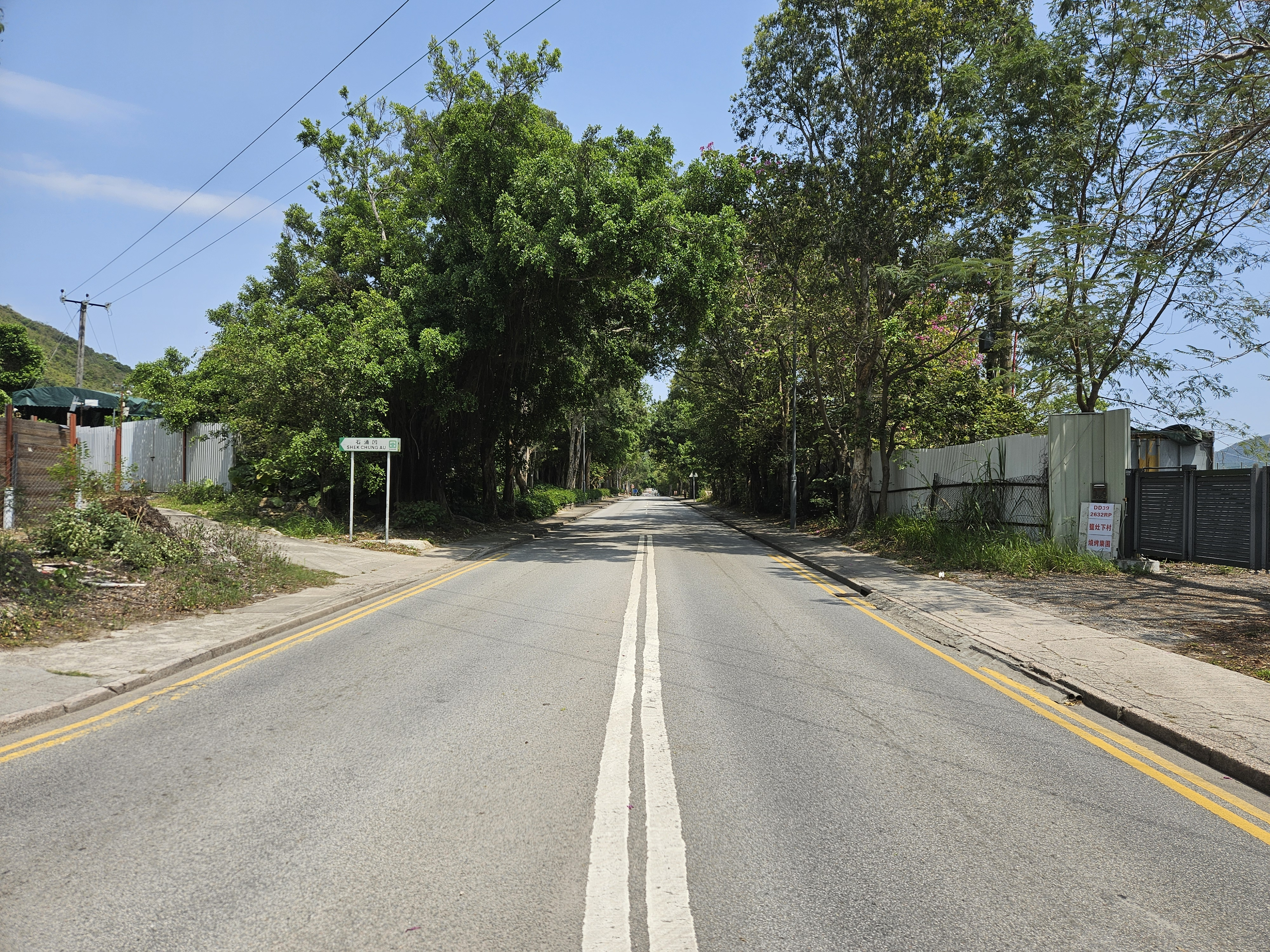
Sha Tau Kok Road – Shek Chung Au

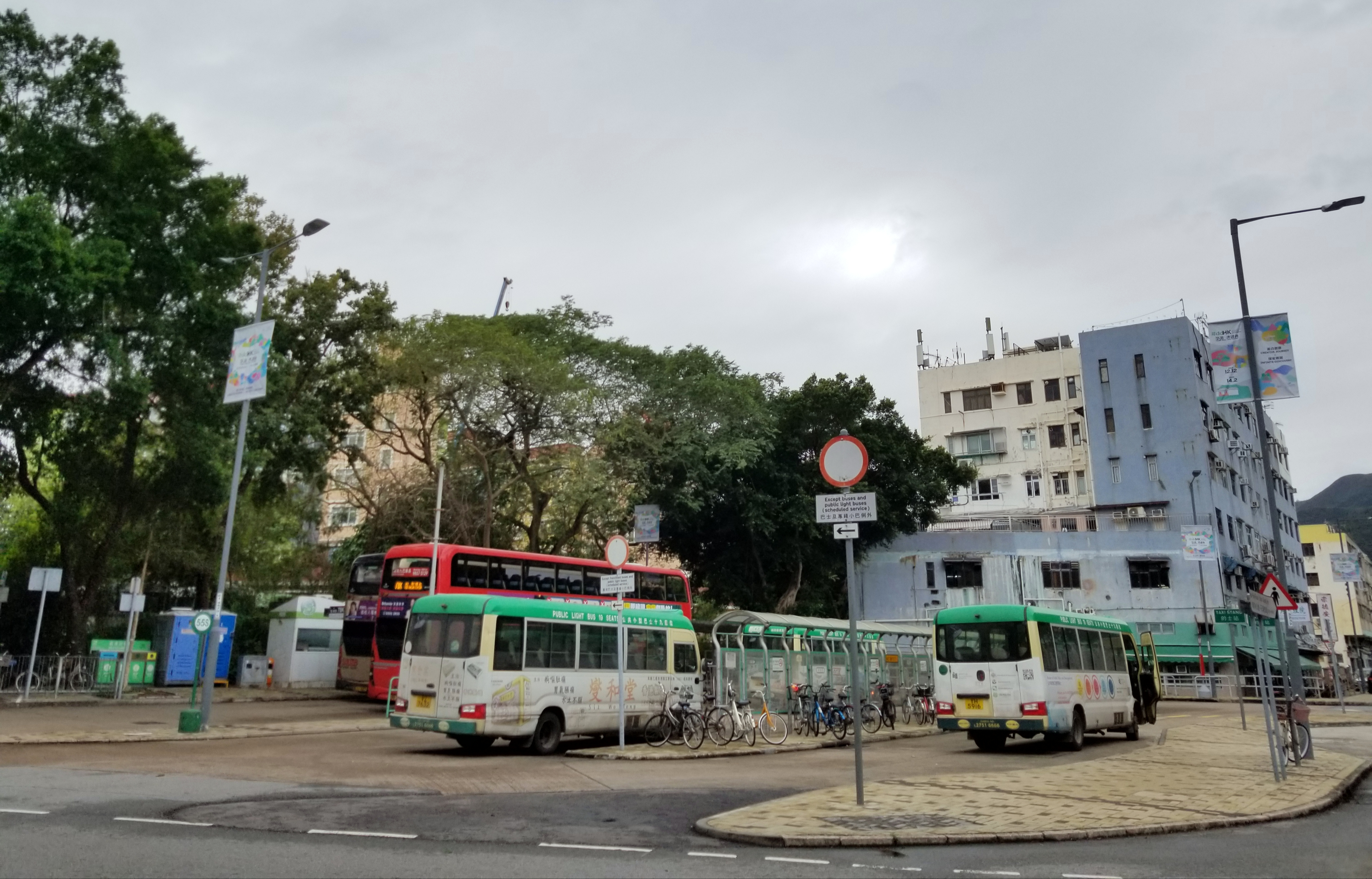
Sha Tau Kok bus terminus

== Public pier ==
The Sha Tau Kok Public Pier is located at the town's northeast coast and is the longest pier in Hong Kong. It spans 280 meters to reach the deeper waters of Starling Inlet, allowing larger vessels to berth at Sha Tau Kok. The pier is used to load and unload goods and berth kaito (街渡) ferries operating between Sha Tau Kok, Kat O, Sam A, Ap Chau, and other northeast rural areas. The original pier was built in the 1960s and renovated from 2004 to 2007. Previously, non-residents of Sha Tau Kok could not make use of kaito ferries departing from the pier for purposes of tourism to islands in Mirs Bay, and instead had to take a much longer journey from Ma Liu Shui pier via Tolo Harbour. As part of the Northern Metropolis development strategy, the government proposed to open Sha Tau Kok Public Pier to tour groups starting from mid-2022. Island hopping for tourists is now possible, with trips to other islands taking 20 to 30 minutes.

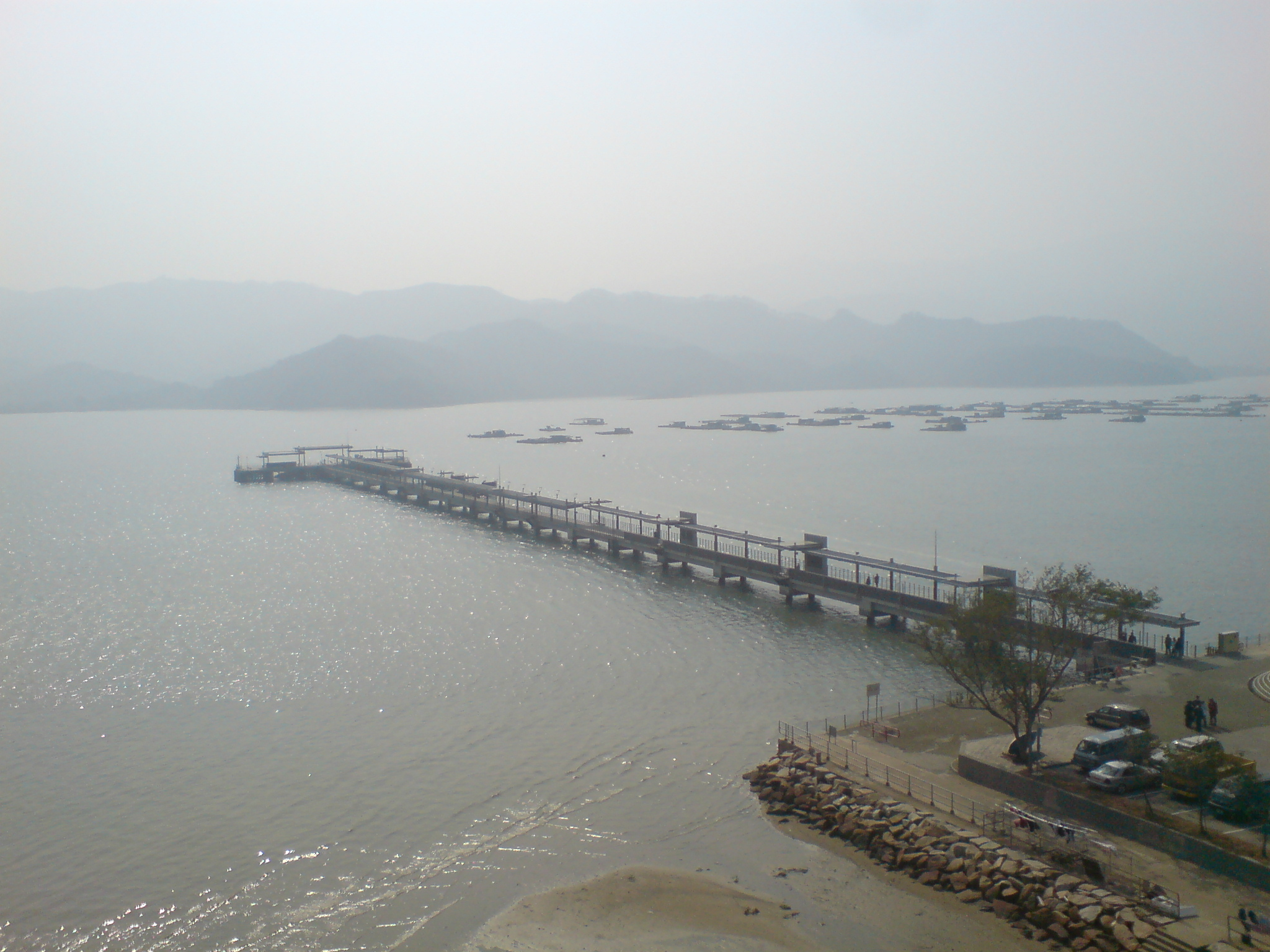
Sha Tau Kok Public Pier

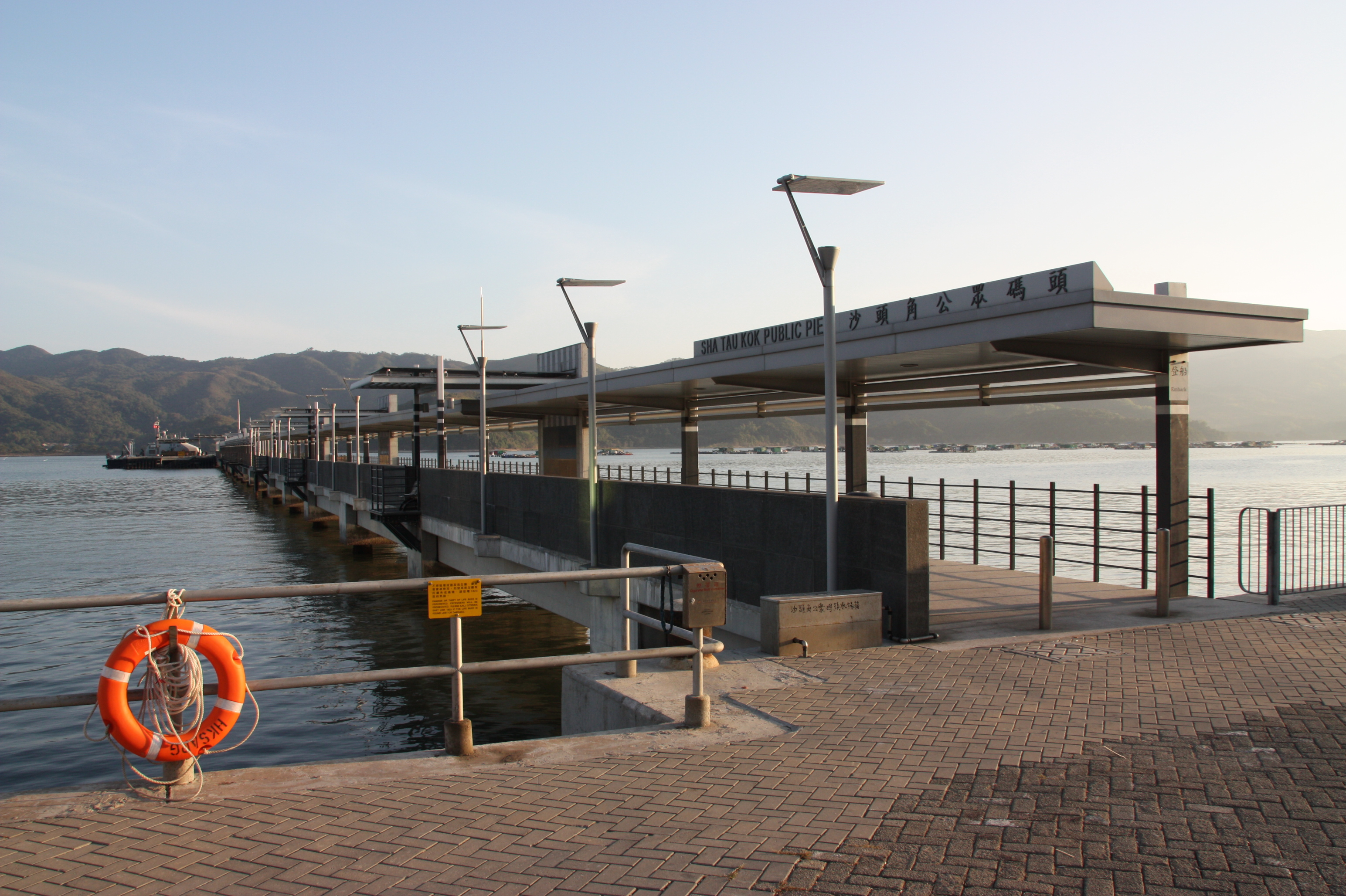
Entrance to the pier

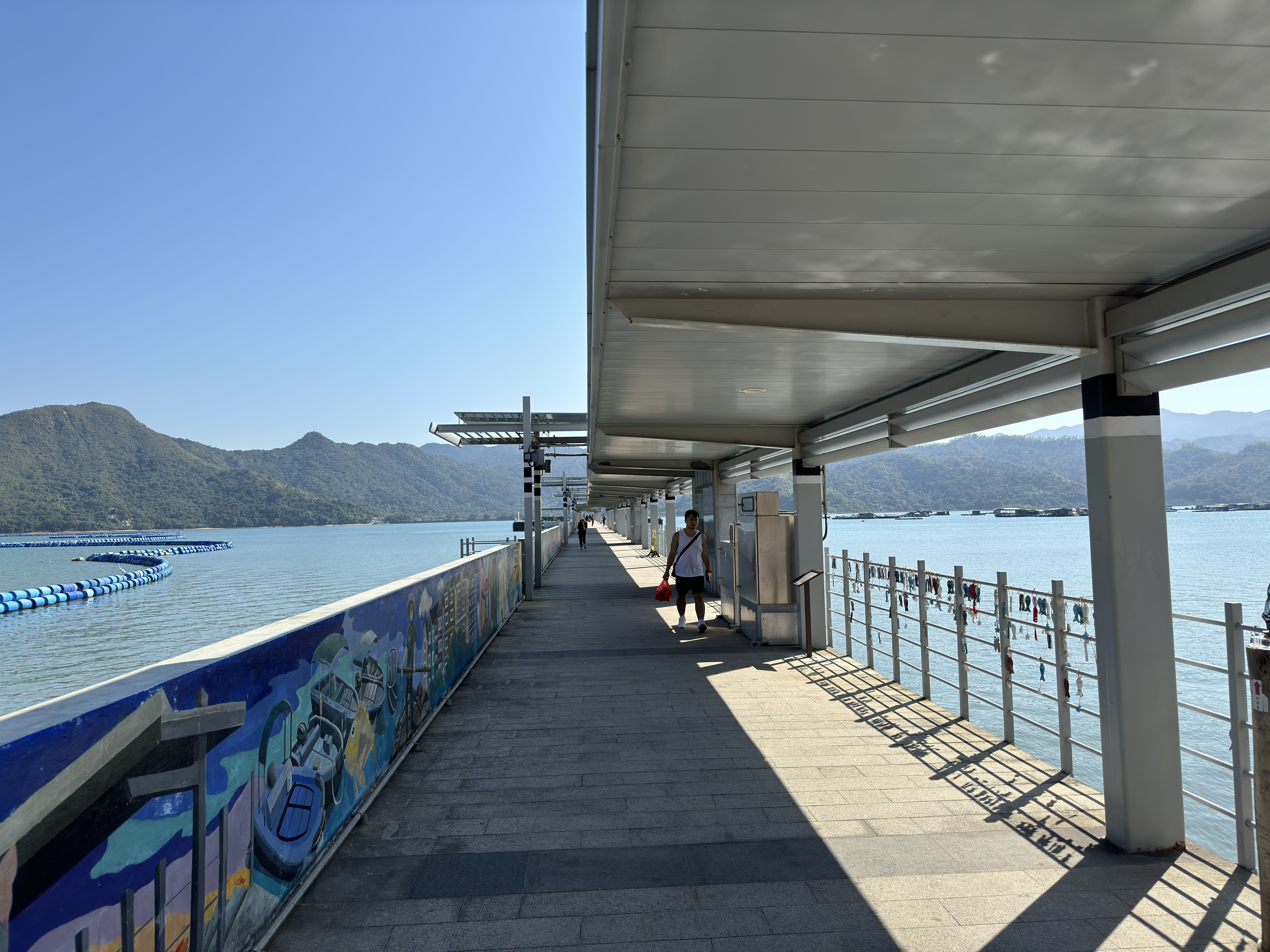
Looking down the pier

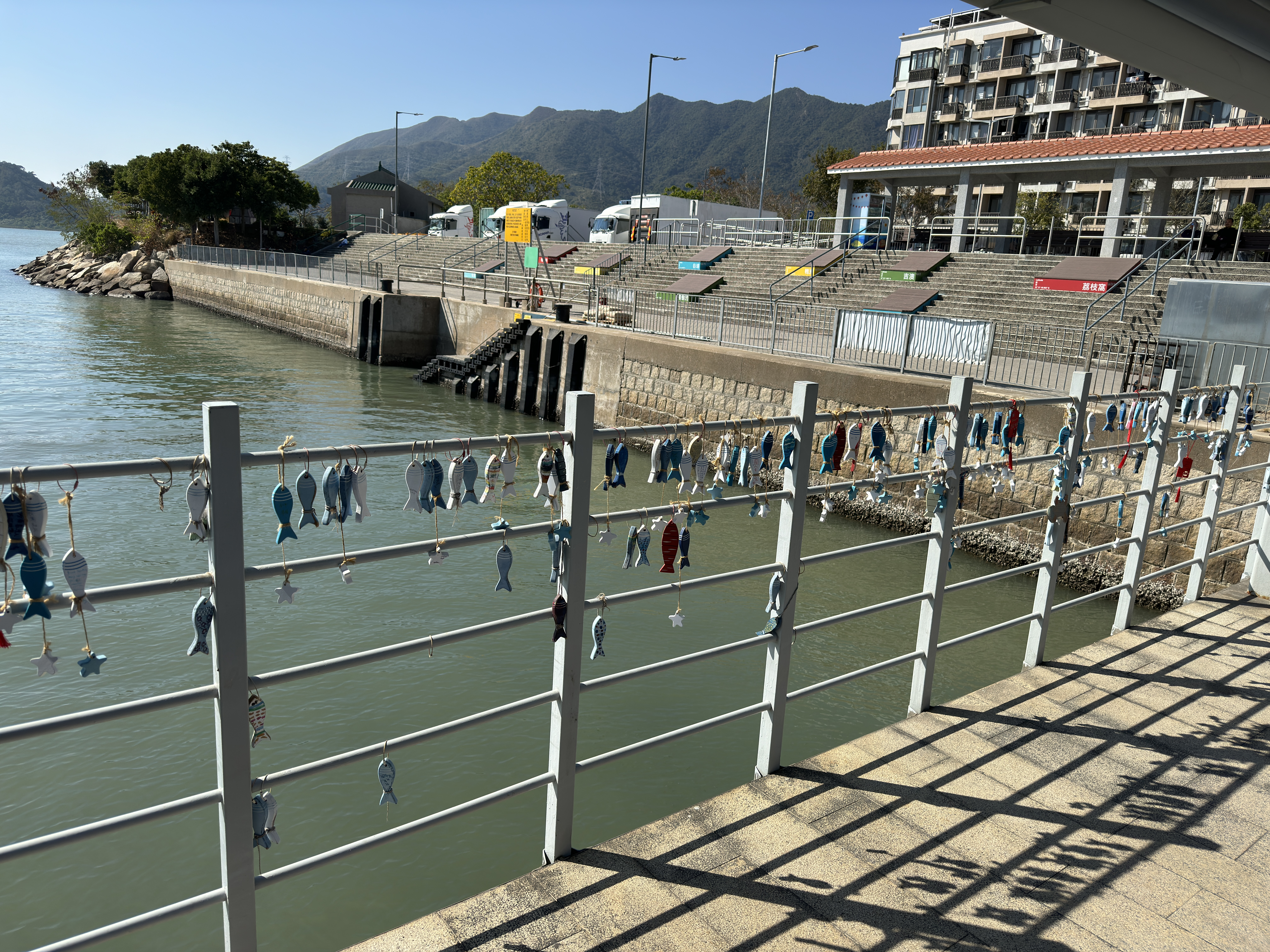
"Wish fish" charms hung on the pier's handrail

== Notable people ==
- Brothers Lee Hong Lim and Lee Wai Lim, former professional footballers who competed in the Hong Kong First Division League
- Alan Yau, restaurateur who was born in Sha Tau Kok and moved to the United Kingdom when he was 12

== See also ==
- Kuk Po
- Lai Chi Wo
- List of places in Hong Kong
- List of villages in Hong Kong
- MacIntosh Forts
