= Sha Tau Kok Control Point =

Border crossing between Hong Kong and mainland China

- 沙頭角管制站
- Interactive map of the Sha Tau Kok Control Point area

General information
- Type: Border control
- Location: Sha Tau Kok, New Territories, Hong Kong, China
- Coordinates: 22°32′56.8″N 114°13′23.8″E
- Opened: 28 February 1985; 41 years ago
- Operator: (Hong Kong) Customs and Excise Department, Immigration Department

Website
- td.gov.hk (Hong Kong)
- Coordinates: 22°32′59″N 114°13′24″E
- Carries: Vehicles (cars and lorries)
- Crosses: Frontier Closed Area

Statistics
- Toll: No toll

Location
- Interactive map of Sha Tau Kok Control Point

Sha Tau Kok Control Point (Chinese: 沙頭角管制站) is a land immigration control point of Hong Kong, located in Sha Tau Kok, North District, New Territories, Hong Kong, along the border between mainland China and Hong Kong.

== Opening ==
Sha Tau Kok was the second cross-border road link between Hong Kong and mainland China, after Man Kam To Control Point. It was officially opened on 28 February 1985 by Zhen Xipui, deputy mayor of Shenzhen, and John Boyd, a Hong Kong government official.

The crossing is open from 7 am to 10 pm. Its counterpart across the border is the Shatoujiao Port.

== Traffic ==
The control point is mainly used by vehicles (cars and lorries). It acts as a border gateway from or to places in eastern Guangdong Province, such as Huizhou and Chaoshan. But it is one of the least frequently used immigration control point in Hong Kong.

Including both drivers and passengers, the Sha Tau Kok Control Point processed 3,866,065 people in 2015, making it the least-used of the four road border crossings in Hong Kong.

== Public transport ==
'Sha Tau Kok Express' buses run to and from Sheung Shui bus station.

== See also ==
- Sha Tau Kok
- Shan Tsui
