= Man Kam To Control Point =

- 文錦渡管制站
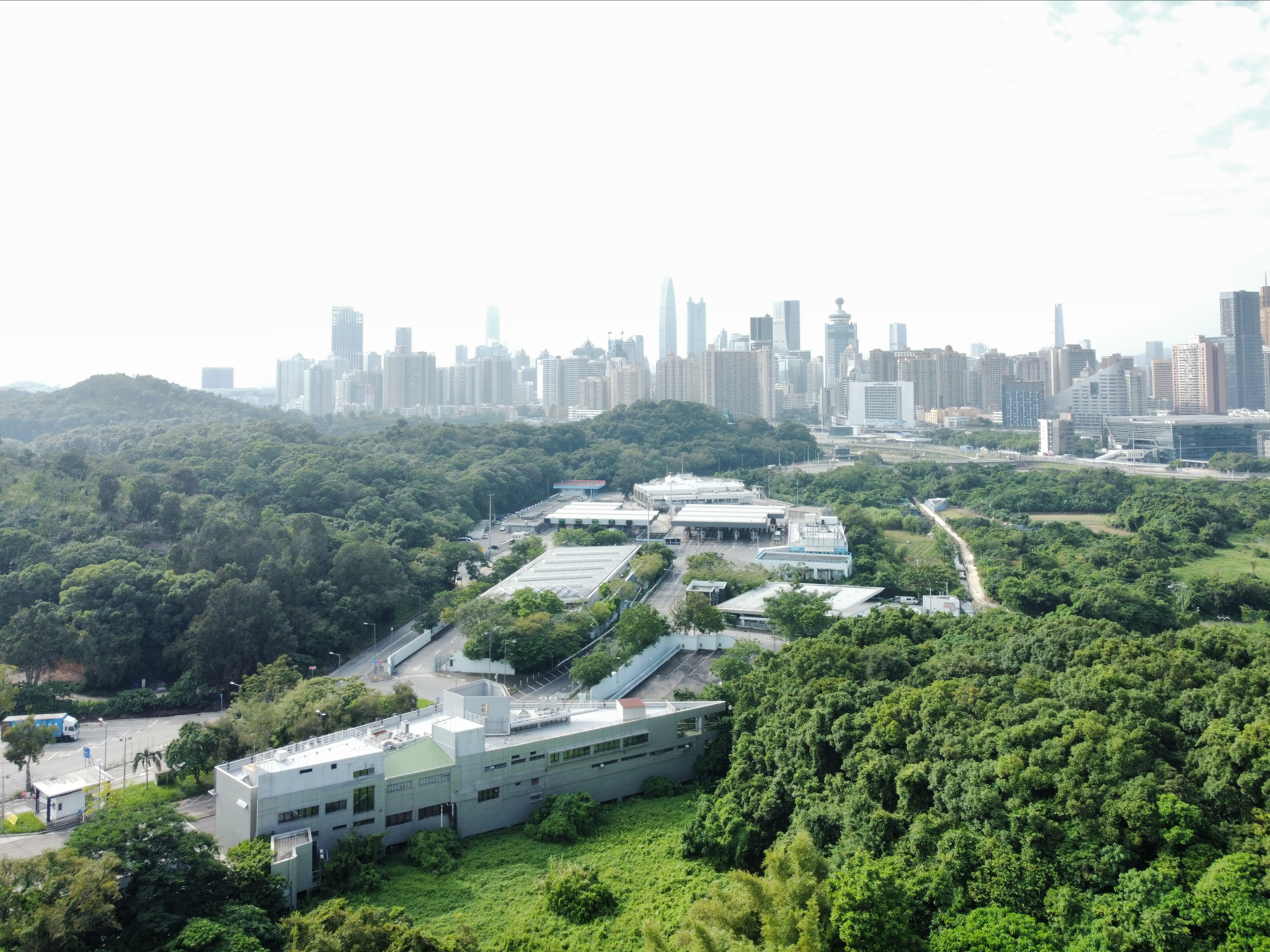
- Interactive map of the Man Kam To Control Point area

General information
- Type: Border control
- Location: Man Kam To, New Territories, Hong Kong
- Coordinates: 22.5370°N 114.1294°E
- Opened: 1976; 50 years ago
- Management: (Hong Kong) Immigration Department, Customs and Excise Department

Website
- ka.sz.gov.cn (mainland China) td.gov.hk (Hong Kong)
- Coordinates: 22°32′13″N 114°07′44″E
- Crosses: Frontier Closed Area

Statistics
- Toll: No toll

Location
- Interactive map of Man Kam To Control Point

Man Kam To Control Point
- Traditional Chinese: 文錦渡管制站
- Simplified Chinese: 文锦渡管制站
- Jyutping: man4 gam2 dou6 gun2 zai3 zaam6
Transcriptions
Standard Mandarin
- Hanyu Pinyin: Wénjǐndù Guǎnzhìzhàn
- Wade–Giles: Wen-chin-tu Kuan-chih-chan
Yue: Cantonese
- Jyutping: man4 gam2 dou6 gun2 zai3 zaam6

Man Kam To Control Point (Chinese: 文錦渡管制站) is a border control point in Man Kam To, New Territories, Hong Kong, within the Closed Area on the border with Shenzhen, Guangdong. It was the first vehicular clearance border crossing in Hong Kong. Its counterpart across the border is the Wenjindu Port, located within Luohu District, Shenzhen, Guangdong Province.

Until 1985, when the Sha Tau Kok border crossing opened, Man Kam To Control Point was the only vehicular link between Hong Kong and China.

== History ==
A new concrete bridge opened at Man Kam To in 1976, replacing an older wooden bridge spanning the Sham Chun River that had deteriorated since. A second concrete bridge, located slightly upriver, was completed in 1984.

As part of the Sham Chun River training works, a new four-lane bridge was built in 2003. Both of the older bridges were demolished at this time.

On 30 January 2020, the border checkpoint closed all border crossing services with the exception of freight trucks, this was due to the COVID-19 pandemic. The border checkpoint reopened on 8 January 2023.

== See also ==
- Heung Yuen Wai Control Point
