= List of Hong Kong journalists =

List of Hong Kong journalists and media professionals, past and present:

== C ==
- Lavender Cheung, i-Cable TV chief anchor
- Cheung Wai-tsz, former Cable TV reporter, now ATV Home journalist and news anchor
- Ching Cheong, The Straits Times Hong Kong correspondent, once jailed for political reasons in mainland China

== J ==
- Jeffrey James, anchor at HKTVB Pearl, Deutsche Welle DW-TV, and CNBC

== K ==
- Kwok Tse Ting, ATV news reporter based in Guangzhou

== L ==
- Jimmy Lai, founder and publisher of Apple Daily
- Willy Wo-Lap Lam, former China head of the South China Morning Post
- Kevin Lau, former editor-in-chief of Ming Pao who was stabbed in an attack widely considered to be an endangerment of press freedom

== R ==
- Renato Reyes, ATV journalist

== T ==
- William Tarrant, journalist in early colonial Hong Kong
