= Liberatum =

Organization

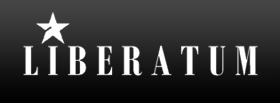
- Liberatum
- Type: Arts

Construction
- Opened: 2001

Website
- www.liberatum.org

Liberatum is an international cultural diplomacy organisation, multimedia and cultural content company founded by Pablo Ganguli in 2001. It creates and presents multidisciplinary artistic platforms and promotes contemporary arts, film, media, literature and culture worldwide through its own festivals, films, summits and other programming. Liberatum champions human rights, freedom of expression and women in creativity through its platforms across the world.

== History ==
Liberatum was founded by Pablo Ganguli in 2001 while he was living in Port Moresby, Papua New Guinea.

== Global programme ==
Liberatum festivals, shows, content, programmes and summits are hosted in worldwide. They have taken place in Russia, Turkey, Papua New Guinea, Germany, Hong Kong, Italy, United Kingdom, France, United States, Brazil, India, Morocco. The festivals encourage new and established artists to perform, discuss and promote their work in front of audiences so that they can debate and interact with their work. The artists are generally from different fields. Liberatum merged the worlds of art, fashion, music, both classical and contemporary encouraging them to collaborate.

Notable figures who have attended and taken part in Liberatum events include Peter Donohoe, Stephen Frears, Sir Norman Rosenthal, Charles Saumarez Smith, Shekhar Kapur, Valery Gergiev, Thomas Ades, Tilda Swinton, Pharrell Williams, Kirsten Dunst, Michael Nyman, Michael Stipe, Philip Treacy, Sir VS Naipaul, Zaha Hadid, Daphne Guinness, Wole Soyinka, Richard Branson, Annie Lennox, Clare Short, Shabana Azmi, Marianne Faithfull, Shashi Tharoor, Courtney Love, Gore Vidal and Goldie Hawn.

== Film ==
Liberatum and illy made a short film in 2014 called Inspiring Creativity featuring James Franco, Hans Zimmer, Tracey Emin, Joan Smalls about what drives their creativity. They have also made a film with W Hotels about transformation, including the performance artist Dita Von Teese; it was directed by Pablo Ganguli and Tomas Auksas.

Liberatum's other film 'Artistry/Technology' is a documentary on the relationship between creativity and technological advancement. David Hockney and Francis Ford Coppola agreed to be in the film.

Liberatum made a feature-length documentary about the environment and climate change entitled In This Climate featuring Sir David Attenborough, Mark Ruffalo, Noam Chomsky and Cher.

== Style ==
Liberatum has presented a wide range of cultural diplomacy programmes and festivals around the world including multidisciplinary ventures in Turkey such as "Istancool" and has developed similar ventures in Hong Kong, Marrakech, Moscow and Berlin consisting of merging several artforms and striking performance art elements. The New York Times described Liberatum as a "cultural festival known for its hip quotient."
