= Pablo Ganguli =

Indian cultural entrepreneur (born 1983)

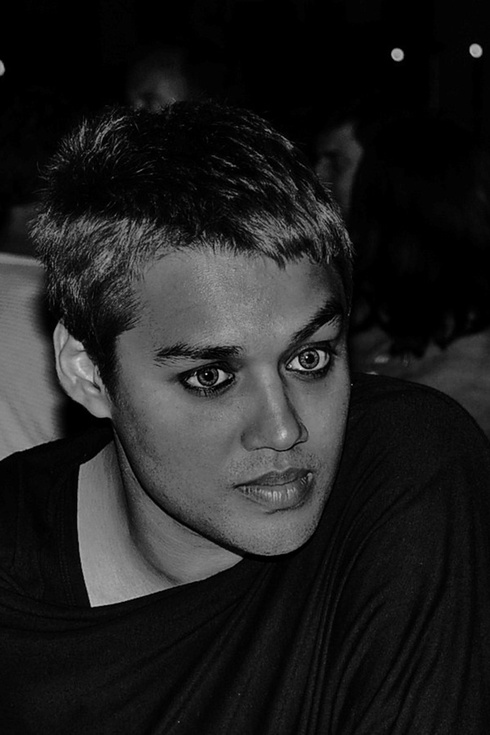
- Born: Kolkata, India
- Education: Port Moresby International High School
- Occupations: Director, Producer, Impresario
- Years active: 2001–present
- Known for: Founder, Liberatum

Pablo Ganguli is an entrepreneur, artist, producer, director and impresario who has created and directed several international festivals, movements and summits of arts, literature, media, film, fashion and culture, through his organisation Liberatum.

Ganguli has led cultural diplomacy ventures worldwide. Ganguli's organisation Liberatum also promotes environmental, human rights, freedom of speech and other important issues.

== Early life ==
Ganguli was born in a Bengali family in Kolkata, West Bengal, India. Some sources state that one of his great-grandfathers was the private secretary to Rabindranath Tagore, the Bengali poet who was Asia's first Nobel laureate. As an infant, Ganguli was brought up by his grandmother. He claimed he had never met his mother, and throughout his childhood was only visited by his art-historian father once a month. He grew up in Kolkata in a creative environment pursuing artistic interests.

== Career ==
In 2001 at the age of 17 Ganguli founded his company, Liberatum, to organise events around the world.

In August 2006, in an article "The Boy Who Beguiled London's Literary Luvvies", a columnist in the Evening Standard of London noted that Ganguli had made 'the remarkable journey from a student studying French in Calcutta to, seemingly, one of the world's leading literary salonistas in just three years'.

In November 2010 and 2011, Ganguli was selected as one of the 1000 most influential figures in London by the Evening Standard.

In March 2011, Ganguli said with regard to the festivals he puts on: "It’s not a job. It’s my life. It’s what I dream about and have nightmares about". The principal source of income for his festivals is sponsorship, which he says is "never easy to get and requires a lot of hard work". He does not pay the speakers at his festivals: "It’s like giving a fee to someone for attending the Oscars."

== Ventures ==
=== Papua New Guinea ===
In 2001, Ganguli created Connect UK, a Papua New Guinea based organisation, whose stated purpose was to forge cultural ties between the South Pacific and Britain. In November 2002, the British High Commission and Connect UK jointly put on the first 'British Week' in that country, 'a celebration of British arts, culture, design, education and science and technology'. Festival participants included Janet Street-Porter and Benjamin Zephaniah.

Ganguli directed the first Women's Rights Conference in Papua New Guinea supported by the PNG, Australian, United States and British governments. Baroness Valerie Amos, the then British Secretary of State for International Development sent a message of good wishes for the conference. The British Council and the Foreign and Commonwealth Office supported the work of Ganguli in Papua New Guinea. Connect UK organised events promoting human rights, youth issues and Aids awareness projects.

=== Morocco ===
Between 2003 and 2006, Ganguli spent part of his time in Morocco. Ganguli was head of public relations and events at Kasbah Agafay and Kssour Agafay, a private member's club and luxury hotel in Marrakesh. Tim Willis in The London Evening Standard on 5 January 2010 reported of Ganguli's deportation from Morocco in 2005 thus: "when, returning from a trip to India in 2005, he learnt that his ex had been expelled from Morocco and that he had 48 hours to leave the country. "I was never given a reason", he says. Ganguli moved into a house owned by Scaddan (his ex lover) in Edinburgh".

=== United Kingdom and Festivals by Ganguli ===
Beginning in 2005, Ganguli moved to the United Kingdom to make it his base. Around the same time, he started creating and directing cultural festivals in different parts of the world.

==== North Africa ====
Arts in Marrakech Festival

The Arts in Marrakech International Festival, a festival of English and Arabic art and literature, was organised by Ganguli and held in Morocco from 29 September to 3 October 2005, and was preceded by Scottish Week Marrakesh, 21–28 September, also organised by Ganguli.

==== India ====
Kitab New Delhi

Kitab, sponsored by the Hindustan Times, with The Times (UK) as its English media partner, was held at the India Habitat Centre in south Delhi, India, 7–9 April 2006. It was India's first international literary festival.

Kitab Mumbai

The second Kitab was held in Mumbai, India, February 23–36, 2007.

==== China ====
Liberatum Hong Kong

Asia Tatler and the Wall Street Journal announced that Ganguli would present Liberatum in Hong Kong in 2012. Participants include Pharrell Williams, Rossy de Palma, Paul Schrader, Thomas Heatherwick, Daniel Wu and Khalil Fong. Vogue China editor in chief said it was one of the very few free cultural events open to the public. The event was reportedly a wild ride with Pharrell Williams as the headliner.

==== Arab World ====
Majestic Petra

The Majestic Petra Festival was originally scheduled to be held in December 2006 in Petra, Jordan. Ganguli postponed the festival in October, citing 'security concerns'. In mid-December 2006 it was reported that the festival's location had changed to Dubai. It eventually did not take place.

==== Russia ====
Jewel of Russia

An international festival of arts, literature and music called "Jewel of Russia" was held in St Petersburg from 27 to 31 October 2007. As of February 2007, Ganguli was hoping to stage talks, readings and discussions.

The St PetersBall

Pablo Ganguli and Liberatum were commissioned by Corinthia Hotels to develop a festival in St Petersburg in November 2010. The St PetersBall celebrated ballet, art, film and fashion.

==== Turkey ====
Istancool

Ganguli founded and directed a major festival of cultural diplomacy and international arts in Istanbul in July 2010 under the title 'Istancool'.

Istancool 2

Liberatum and Ganguli worked in partnership with Turkish agency Istanbul '74 and AnOther Magazine on the second edition of Istancool in May 2011.

==== Europe ====
England

On 23 November 2010, Pablo Ganguli launched the Liberatum Cultural Honour award and hosted a Liberatum dinner in honour of Nobel Laureate Sir VS and Lady Naipaul. The dinner was held in London at the Langham Hotel.

In 2011, Pablo Ganguli, Liberatum and W Hotels hosted an event celebrating fashion and cinema with Andre Leon Talley, Dame Vivienne Westwood and Manolo Blahnik in London.

== Films ==
Inspiring Creativity

Ganguli directed a short film with illy in international press. The film featured several world-renowned artists, musicians and actors such as James Franco, Tracey Emin and Hans Zimmer. It was co-directed by Tomas Auksas.

Artistry/Technology

Ganguli directed another short film with Tomas Auksas on the relationship between art and technology featuring Frank Gehry, David Hockney, Francis Ford Coppola and MIA.

In This Climate

Ganguli made a feature-length documentary with Tomas Auksas on climate change and the environment called in This Climate featuring Sir David Attenborough, Mark Ruffalo and Cher.

== Personal life ==
In 2000, Ganguli met Simon Scaddan, then British Deputy High Commissioner to eastern India, at a musical soiree in the French Consulate in Calcutta. When Scaddan became British High Commissioner to Papua New Guinea in 2001, Ganguli moved into his diplomatic residence as his official consort/partner. The relationship became public in 2003.

In August 2006 it was reported that the Ganguli and Scaddan had split, although remaining friends, and that Ganguli was living in Scaddan's Edinburgh apartment. In 2007, it was reported that Ganguli was living in Wales. In 2009, The Times stated that Ganguli was based in London.

The Times reported in 2009 that Ganguli's partner was the Lithuanian artist Tomas Auksas who joined him at his Moscow festival. In 2024, Ganguli was photographed with his Brazilian fiancé Lucas Vilas by Vanity Fair in Venice at a Liberatum award event honouring the American actress Ellen Burstyn.
