= Wo Hang (disambiguation) =

Wo Hang (Chinese: 禾坑) is an area in Sha Tau Kok, Hong Kong. The term is part of the name of several places in Hong Kong, including:

- Ha Wo Hang, a village
- Sheung Wo Hang, a village
- Tso Wo Hang, a village
- Wo Hang Tai Long, a village
