= Au Ha =

Hakka village in China

Au Ha 凹下
- Village
- Location within Hong Kong
- Coordinates: 22.527625°N 114.195578°E
- Country: People's Republic of China
- Special administrative region: Hong Kong
- Region: New Territories
- Time zone: UTC+8:00 (HKT)

Au Ha (Chinese: 凹下) is a Hakka village in northern New Territories in Hong Kong. Au Ha is located on the south side of Sha Tau Kok Road (Wo Hang Section) between Fanling and Sha Tau Kok, north of Sheung Wo Hang and west of Ha Wo Hang. Its name means "below the mountain pass" in Cantonese.

== Administration ==
Au Ha is a recognized village under the New Territories Small House Policy. It is one of the villages represented within the Sha Tau Kok District Rural Committee. For electoral purposes, Au Ha is part of the Sha Ta constituency, which is currently represented by Ko Wai-kei.

== History ==
The villages of Ma Tseuk Leng (upper and lower), Yim Tso Ha, Wu Shek Kok and Au Ha formed a yeuk (約), a form of oath-sworn, inter-village, mutual-aid alliance.

== See also ==
- Sha Tau Kok Railway
