= Ma Tseuk Leng =

Village in Sha Tau Kok, Hong Kong

Coordinates: 22.533473°N 114.199946°E

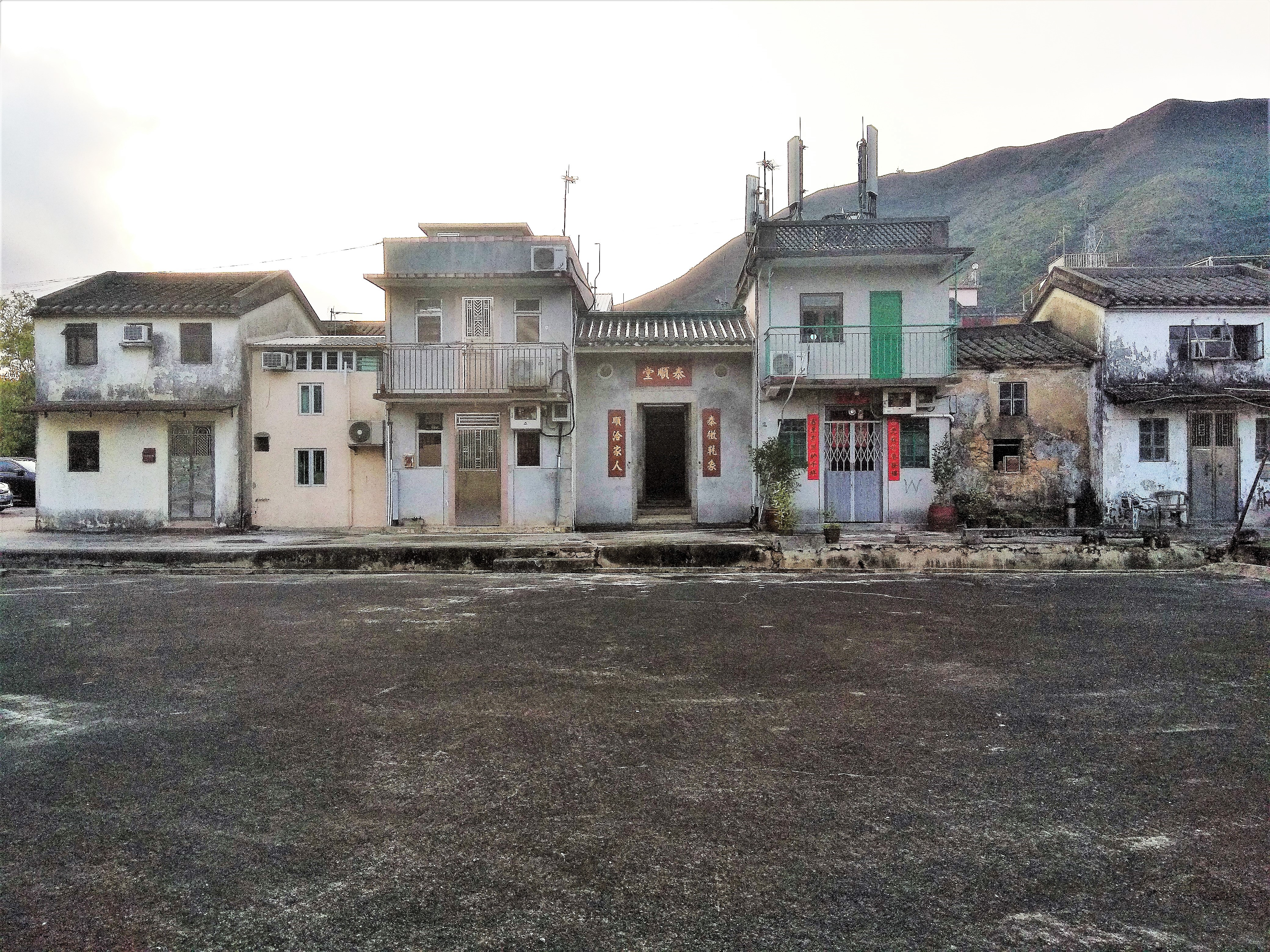
Ma Tseuk Leng San Uk Ha (麻雀嶺新屋下) is a walled village.

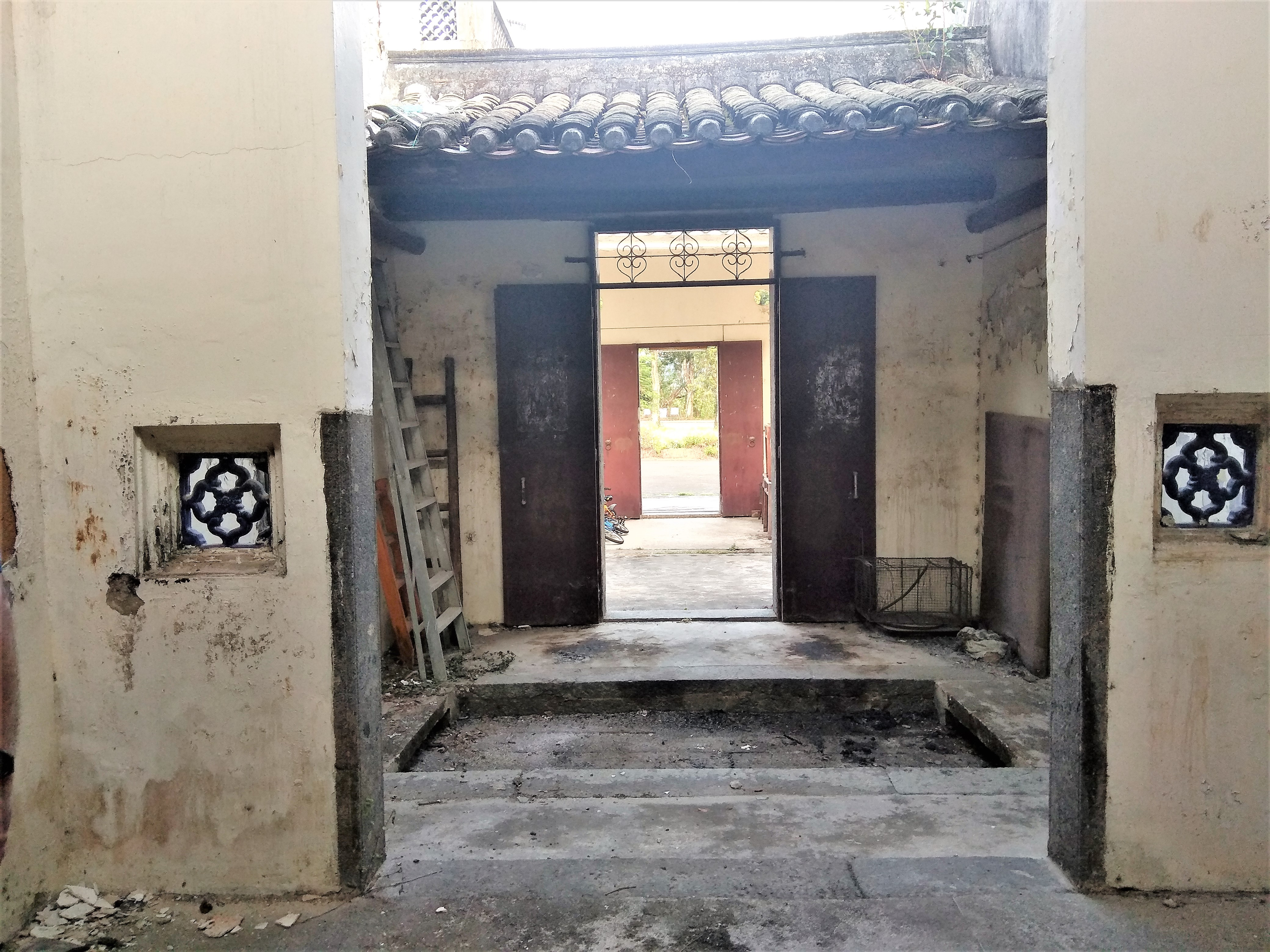
Ma Tseuk Leng San Uk Ha.

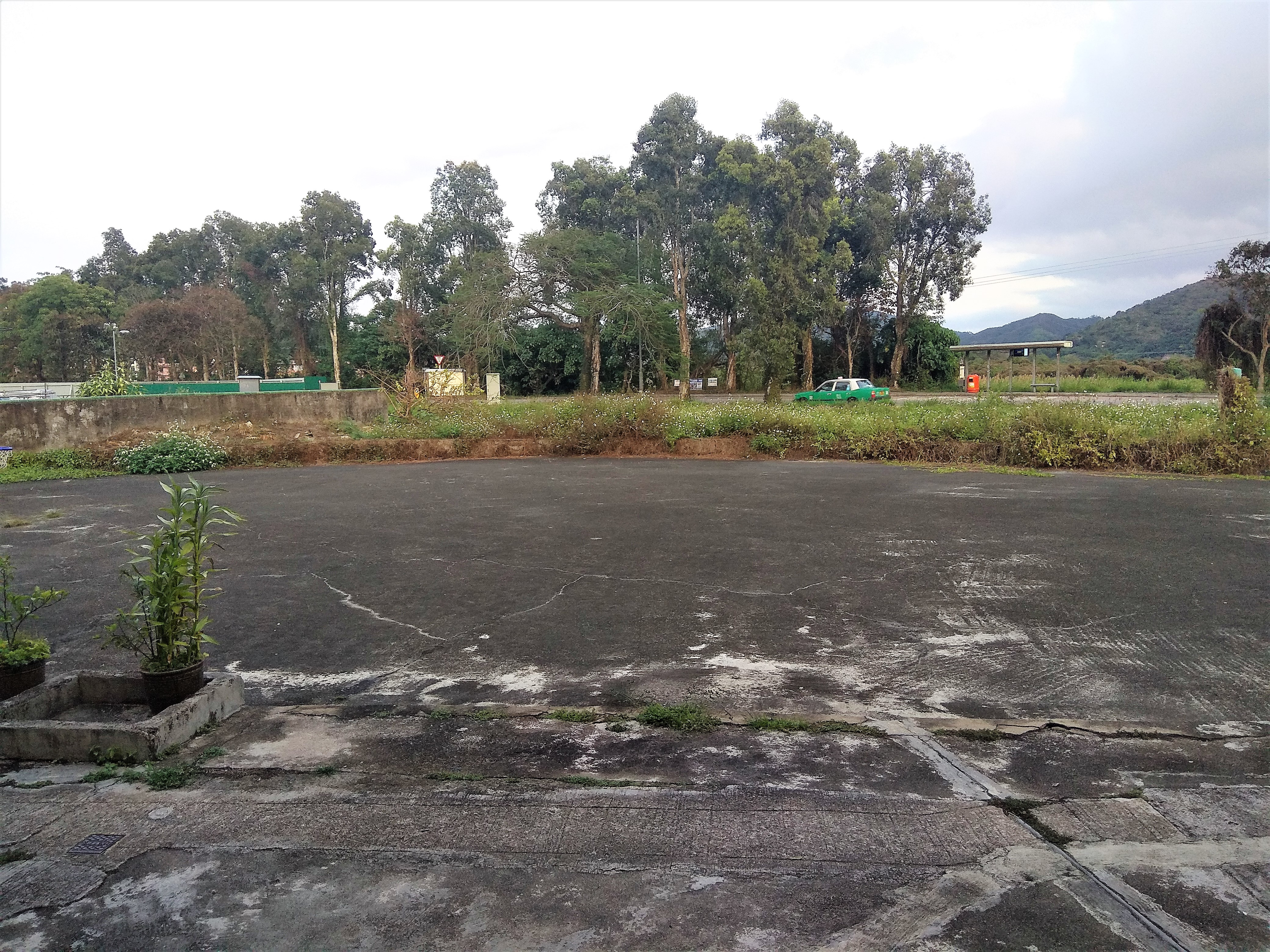
Former village pond of Ma Tseuk Leng San Uk Ha, with Sha Tau Kok Road in the background.

Ma Tseuk Leng (Chinese: 麻雀嶺), sometimes transliterated as Ma Tseuk Ling, is an area in Sha Tau Kok, North District, Hong Kong.

The area contains the villages of Ma Tseuk Leng Sheung (麻雀嶺上; 'Upper Ma Tseuk Leng') and Ma Tseuk Leng Ha (麻雀嶺下; 'Lower Ma Tseuk Leng'). Ma Tseuk Leng San Uk Ha (麻雀嶺新屋下; 'New Lower Ma Tseuk Leng'), part of Ma Tseuk Leng Ha, is a historic Hakka walled village.

== Administration ==
Ma Tseuk Leng is a recognized village under the New Territories Small House Policy. It is one of the villages represented within the Sha Tau Kok District Rural Committee. For electoral purposes, Ma Tseuk Leng is part of the Sha Ta constituency, which is currently represented by Ko Wai-kei.

== History ==
Ma Tseuk Leng Sheung is a Hakka village that was historically inhabited by nine clans. Some of them left and the remaining clans were the Tsang (曾), the Yeung (楊), the Yau (邱), the Mo (巫) and the Lee (李). The first settlers of the village were the Tsang and the Yeung. They arrived in 1655. The Tsang had moved from Changle (長樂) in Guangdong province and have the same ancestor with the Tsang of Sam A Tsuen and Lai Chi Wo.

When the ban on human settlement of coastal areas of the Great Clearance was lifted in 1668, the coastal defense was reinforced. Twenty-one fortified mounds, each manned with an army unit, were created along the border of Xin'an County, and at least five of them were located in present-day Hong Kong. 1) The Tuen Mun Mound, believed to have been built on Castle Peak or Kau Keng Shan, was manned by 50 soldiers. 2) The Kowloon Mound on Lion Rock and 3) the Tai Po Tau Mound northwest of Tai Po Old Market had each 30 soldiers. 4) The Ma Tseuk Leng Mound stood between present-day Sha Tau Kok and Fan Ling and was manned by 50 men. 5) The fifth one at Fat Tong Mun, probably on today's Tin Ha Shan Peninsula, was an observation post manned by 10 soldiers. In 1682, these forces were re-organized and manned by detachments from the Green Standard Army with reduced strength.

According to the 1688 Gazetteer of Xin'an County, only two villages were established in the modern day Sha Tau Kok area: Ma Tseuk Leng and Man Uk Pin. Both were small agricultural settlements. Wo Hang, although existing, was not recognized.

The villages of Ma Tseuk Leng (upper and lower), Yim Tso Ha, Wu Shek Kok and Au Ha formed a yeuk (約), a form of oath-sworn, inter-village, mutual-aid alliance.

At the time of the 1911 census, the total population of Ma Tseuk Leng was 125. The number of males was 47.

== Features ==
Two ancestral halls of the Tsang were built in Ma Tseuk Leng Sheung. One of them was built in the 19th century. It was rebuilt in 1929 and renovated in 1951. The other one collapsed before the Japanese Occupation of Hong Kong.

== See also ==
- Walled villages of Hong Kong
- Robin's Nest, a nearby hill. The former Chinese name of Robin's nest is 麻雀嶺 (Ma Tseuk Leng)
