= Shek Chung Au =

Village in Hong Kong

Coordinates: 22.536738°N 114.209073°E

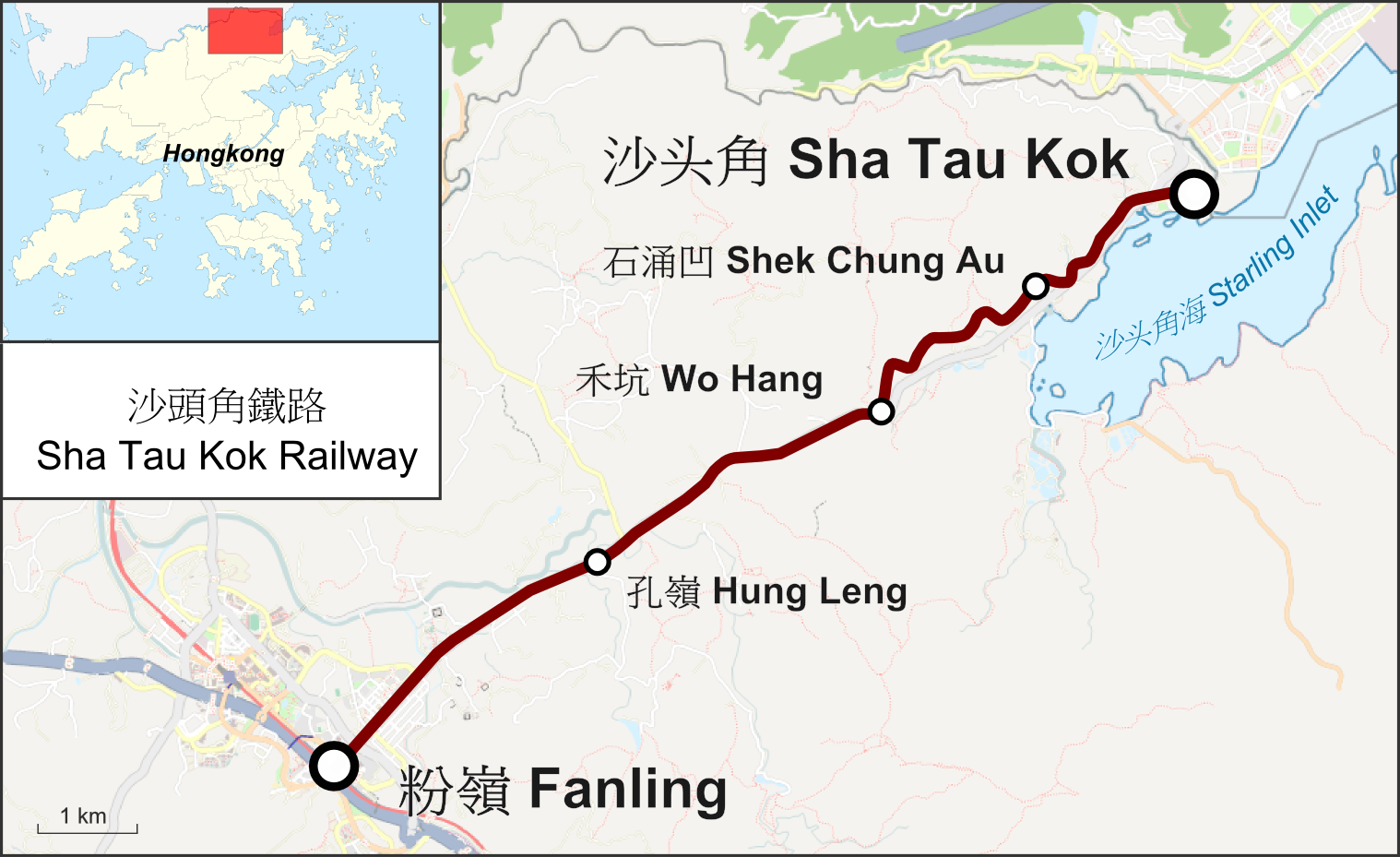
Map of the former Sha Tau Kok Railway showing the location of Shek Chung Au Station.

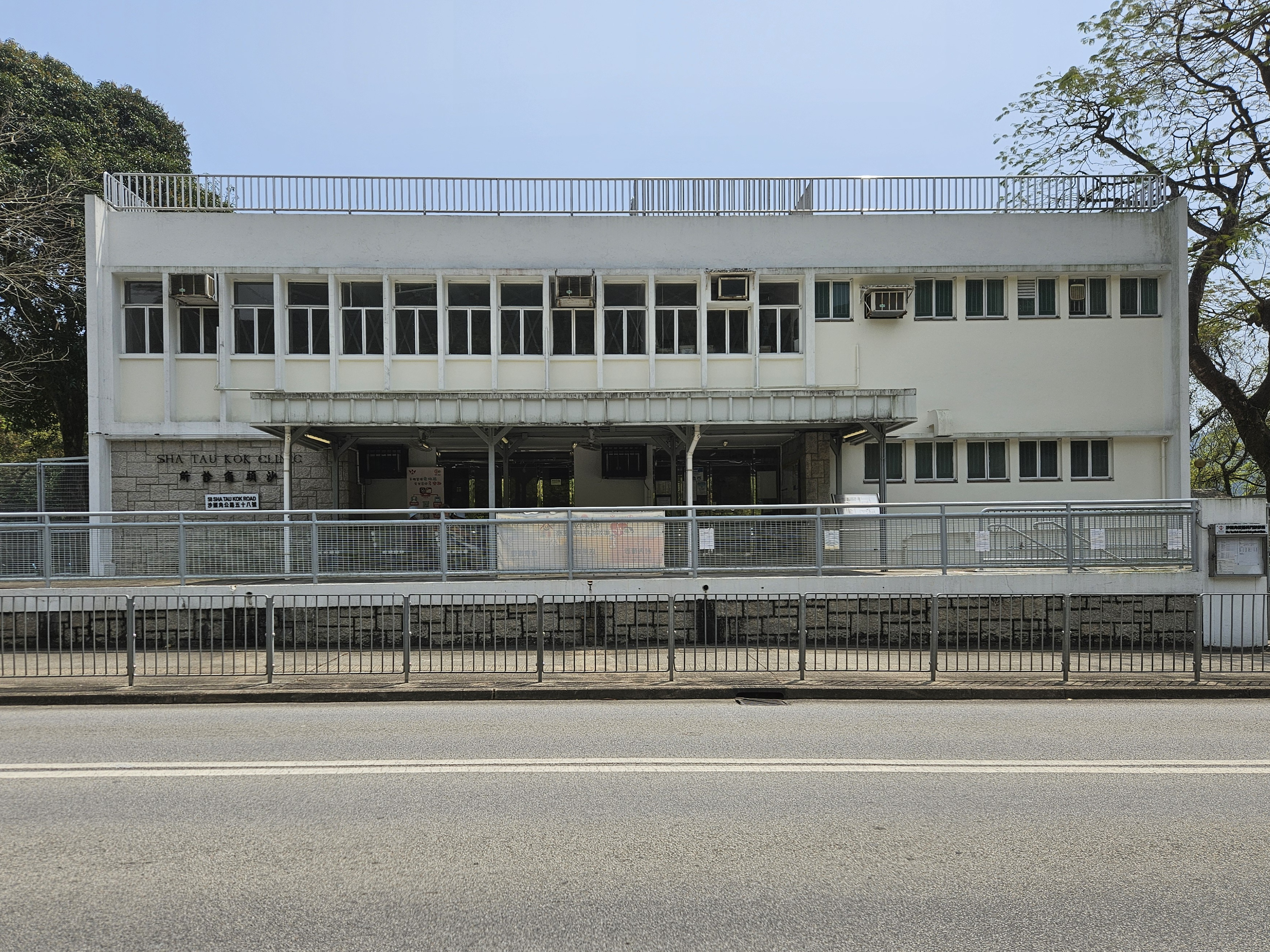
Sha Tau Kok Clinic along Sha Tau Kok Road - Shek Chung Au at Shek Chung Au.

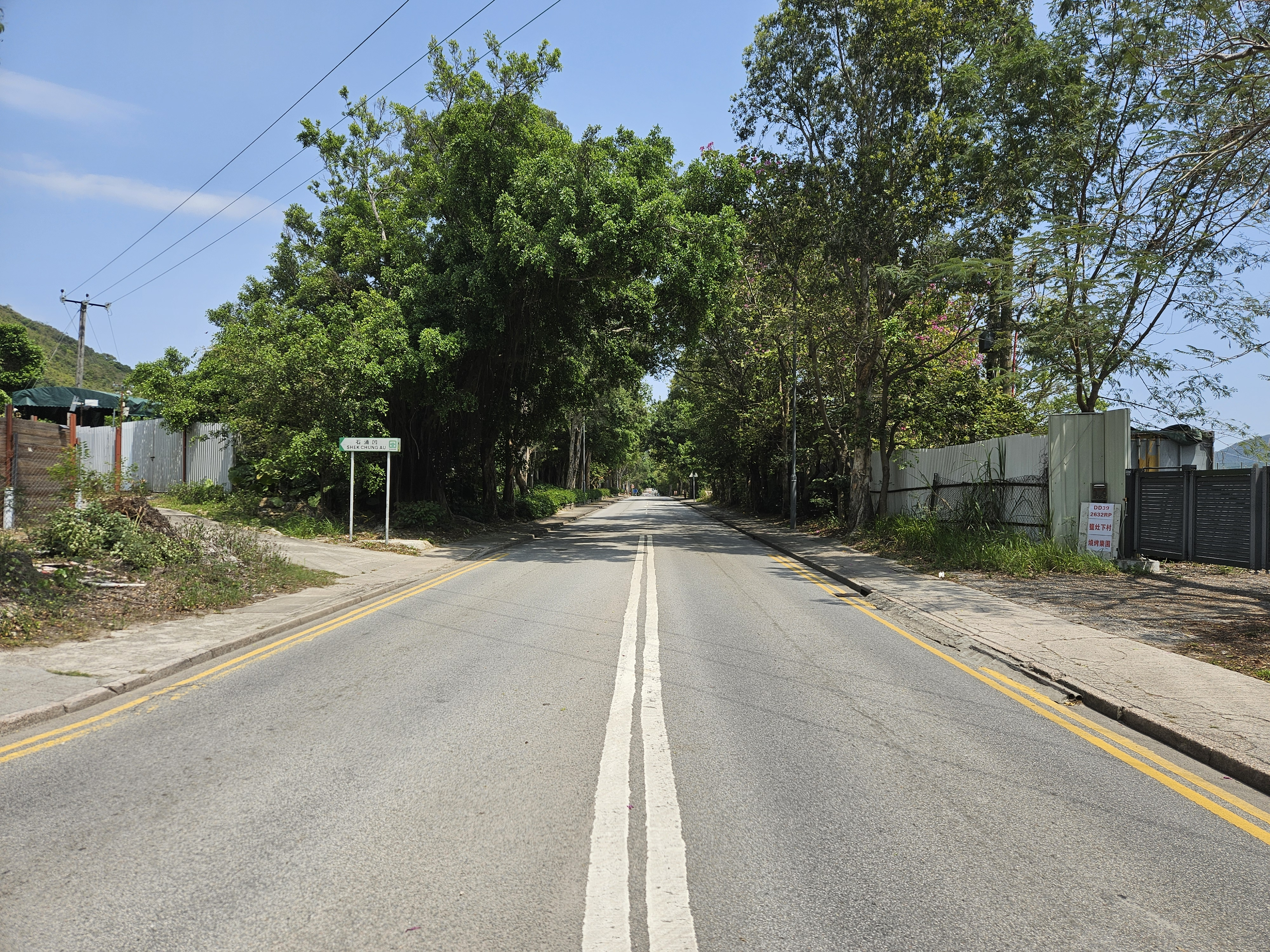
Sha Tau Kok Road - Shek Chung Au near Shek Chung Au.

Shek Chung Au (Chinese: 石涌凹) is a village in the Sha Tau Kok area of North District of Hong Kong.

== Administration ==
Shek Chung Au is a recognised village under the New Territories Small House Policy. It is one of the villages represented within the Sha Tau Kok District Rural Committee. For electoral purposes, Shek Chung Au is part of the Sha Ta constituency, which is currently represented by Ko Wai-kei.

== Location ==
Nearby villages include Wu Shek Kok, located southeast of Shek Chung Au, directly across Sha Tau Kok Road; Shek Kiu Tau in the southwest and Tong To in the northeast.

== History ==
Shek Chung Au was historically an important traffic node, and a military post was located there during several hundred years, until the mid-19th century.

In 1911, the Sha Tau Kok Railway was opened as far as Shek Chung Au. The light railway was then extended to Sha Tau Kok in 1912. Shek Chung Au Station (石涌凹站) remained as one of the five stations of the line.

On 15 February 2012, areas around Sha Tau Kok (but not the town itself), as well as Mai Po, were taken out of the Frontier Closed Area, opening up 740 hectares (1,800 acres) of land for public access. A checkpoint on the original perimeter, operated by the Police and the Customs and Excise Department at Shek Chung Au, was officially decommissioned on 14 February 2012, and its functions taken over by a new checkpoint outside of Sha Tau Kok.

== See also ==
- Sha Tau Kok Road
- International College Hong Kong
- Starling Inlet
