= Hung Fa Chai =

Hill in the New Territories of Hong Kong

- 紅花寨
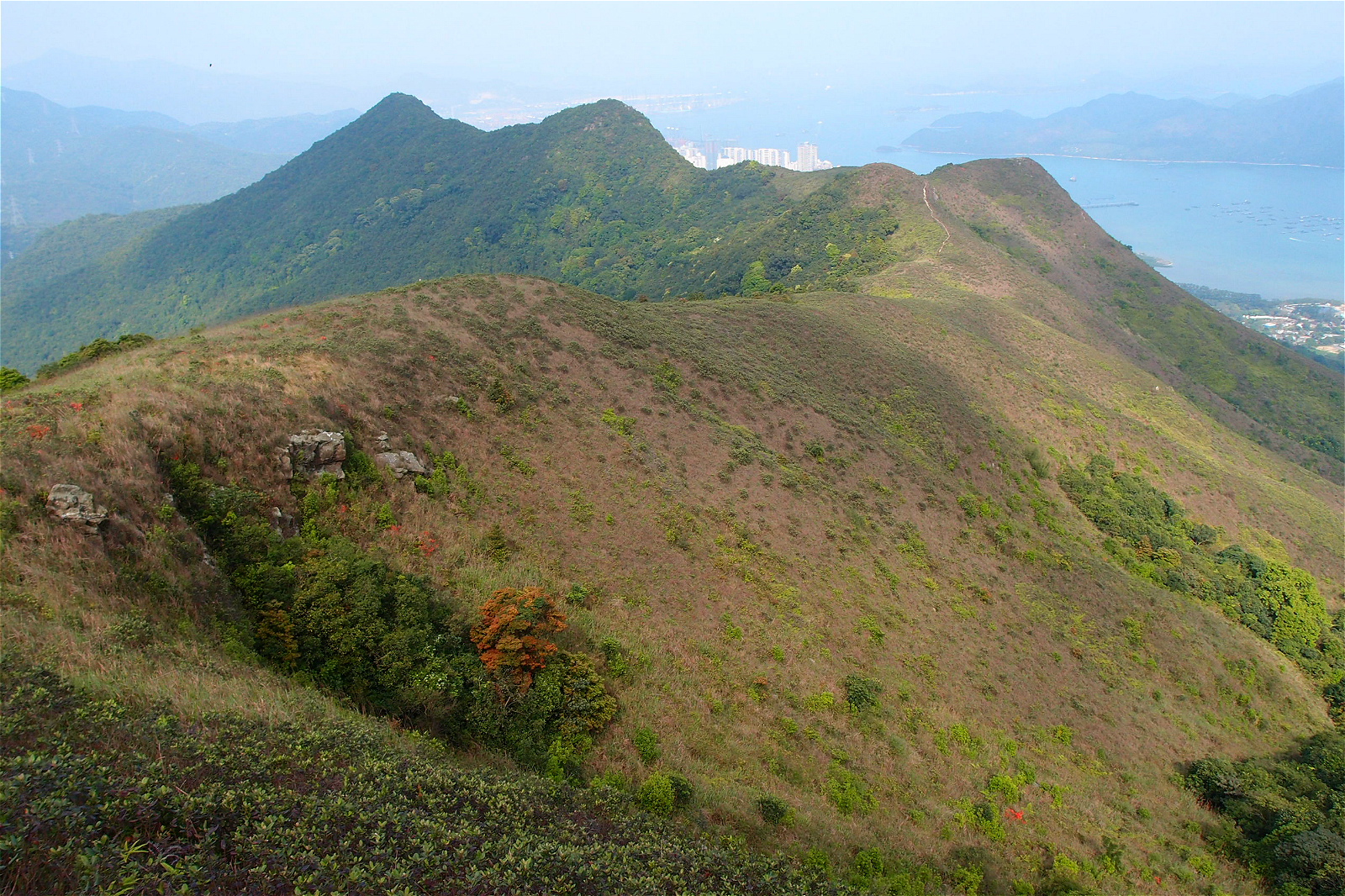
- View of Hung Fa Chai Ridge

Highest point
- Elevation: 489 m (1,604 ft)
- Coordinates: 22.54298°N 114.19410°E

Geography
- Location within Hong Kong
- Location: Hong Kong

Hung Fa Chai (Chinese: 紅花寨) is a hill in Robin's Nest Country Park, New Territories, Hong Kong. With a height of 489 metres (1,604 ft), it lies 500 metres (1,600 ft) to the northeast of Robin's Nest, and is no longer inside the Frontier Closed Area south of the border with Shenzhen in mainland China. Hikers can reach there without any permit. On old Colonial maps of Hong Kong, it was marked as Ben Nevis, after the highest mountain in Scotland. It is the most northerly of all Hong Kong's hills over 300 metres (980 ft) featured in the list of mountains, peaks and hills in Hong Kong.

Hung Fa Chai (紅花寨) has the same 'red flower' root (紅花) as Robin's Nest while Chai (寨) can mean either 'stockaded village', 'camp' or 'mountain stronghold'.

== See also ==
- Robin's Nest
