= Man Uk Pin =

Hakka walled village in Hong Kong

Coordinates: 22.526382°N 114.184367°E

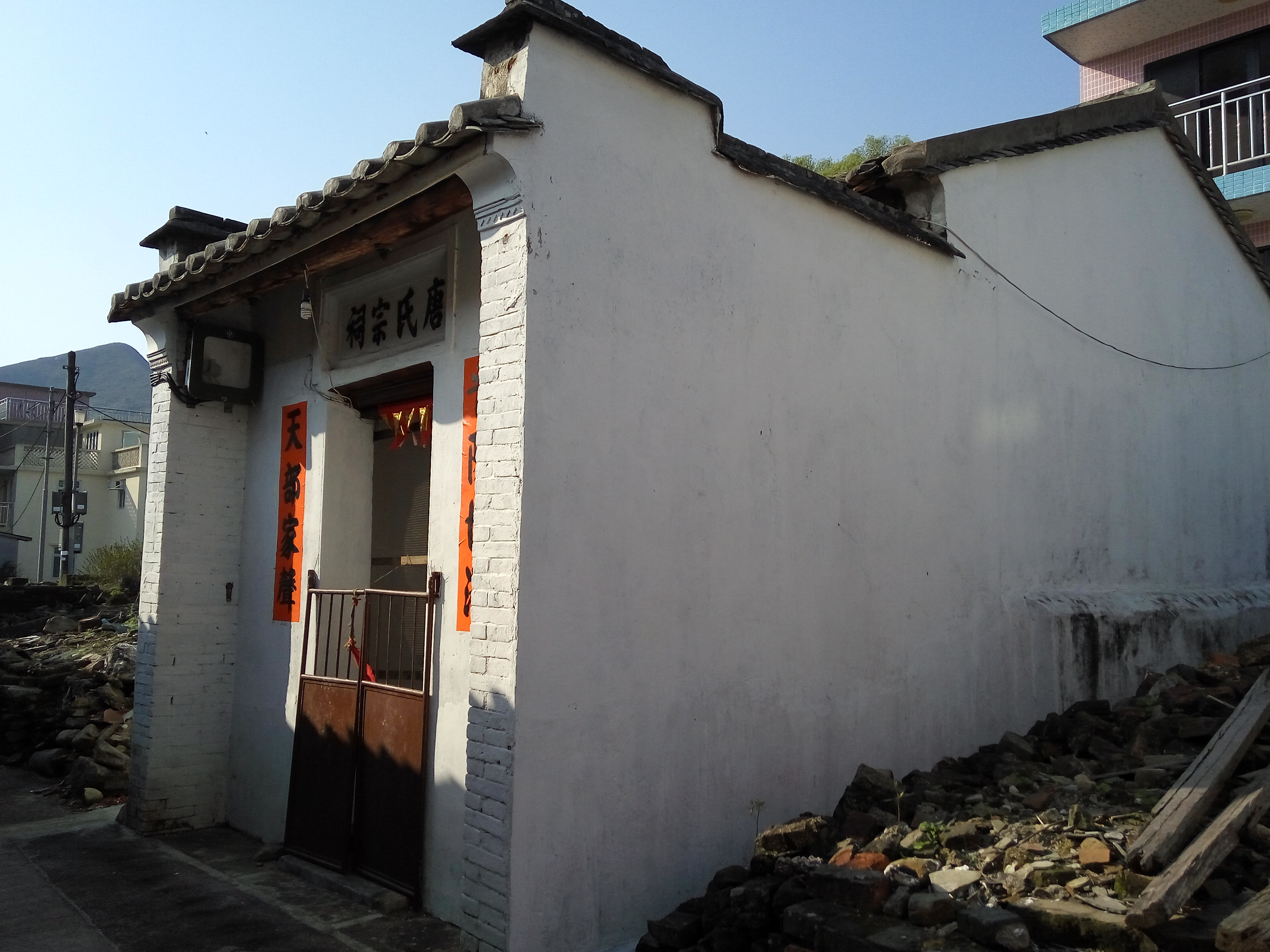
Tong Ancestral Hall in Man Uk Pin.

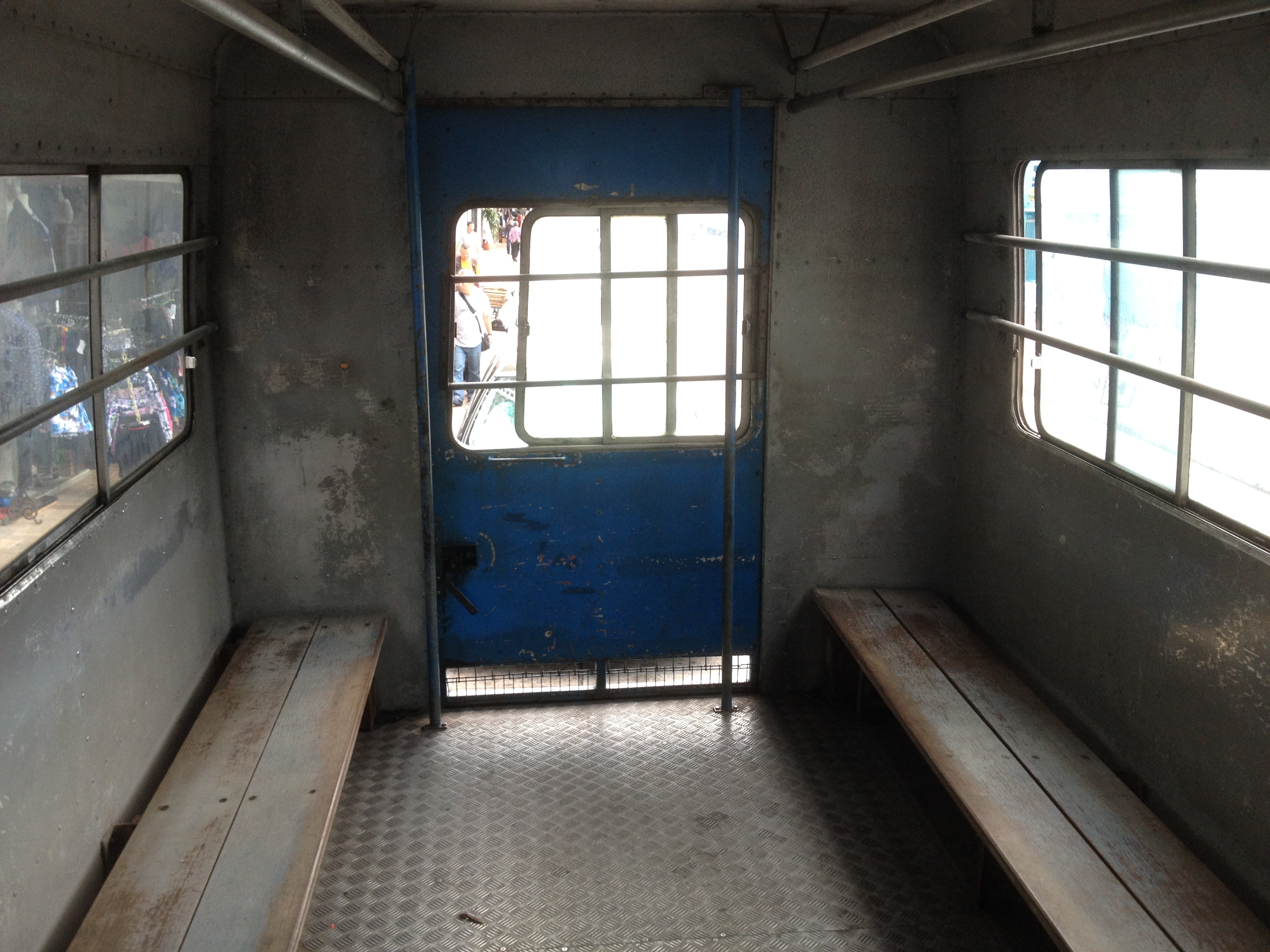
Interior of a "lorry bus" serving Man Uk Pin.

Man Uk Pin (Chinese: 萬屋邊) is a Hakka walled village in Sha Tau Kok, North District, Hong Kong.

== Administration ==
Man Uk Pin is a recognized village under the New Territories Small House Policy. It is one of the villages represented within the Sha Tau Kok District Rural Committee. For electoral purposes, Man Uk Pin is part of the Sha Ta constituency, which is currently represented by Ko Wai-kei.

== Geography ==
Man Uk Pin is located in the north-eastern New Territories of Hong Kong, on the north-western side of Sha Tau Kok Road, close to Wo Hang.

== History ==
According to the 1688 Gazetteer of Xin'an County, only two villages were established in the modern day Sha Tau Kok area: Ma Tseuk Leng and Man Uk Pin. Both were small agricultural settlements. Wo Hang, although existing, was not recognized.

Man Uk Pin was recorded as a Hakka village in the 1819 Gazetteer of Xin'an County. It was first settled in the late 17th century by the Man (萬) who came from Wuhua (五華) in Guangdong province. The Man later moved out of the village and stayed in Heung Yuen, Ping Che and Tong Fong nearby. The village was later settled by the Chung (鍾) and the Fu (傅) in the 18th century and later by the Tong (唐), the Law (羅), the Chan (陳) and others. The Tong came to the village around the 19th century from Pingshan (坪山) in Guangdong.

== Features ==
Out of the eight ancestral halls that were built in the village, four are still standing today. One of them, the Tong Ancestral Hall, has been listed as a Grade III historic building.

== See also ==
- Walled villages of Hong Kong
