= Shek Kiu Tau =

Coordinates: 22.532308°N 114.204011°E

Shek Kiu Tau (Chinese: 石橋頭) is a village in the Sha Tau Kok area of North District of Hong Kong.

== Administration ==
Shek Kiu Tau is a recognized village under the New Territories Small House Policy. It is one of the villages represented within the Sha Tau Kok District Rural Committee. For electoral purposes, Shek Kiu Tau is part of the Sha Ta constituency, which is currently represented by Ko Wai-kei.

== History ==
At the time of the 1911 census, the population of Shek Kiu Tau was 98. The number of males was 37.

== See also ==
- Shek Chung Au
