= Robin's Nest =

Robin's Nest may refer to:

- Robin's Nest (Hong Kong), a hill and country park in northeastern New Territories of Hong Kong
- Robin's Nest (TV series), a British sitcom made by Thames Television
- Robin's Nest (estate), the fictional Hawaiian estate in Magnum P.I.
- The Robins' Nest, home ground of English football club Knowle F.C.
