= San Tsuen =

Coordinates: 22.5446°N 114.2148°E

- Chinese: 新村
- Literal meaning: New Village
Transcriptions
Standard Mandarin
- Hanyu Pinyin: Xīncūn
- Wade–Giles: Hsin^{1}-ts‘un^{1}
- IPA: [ɕín.tsʰwə́n]
Hakka
- Pha̍k-fa-sṳ: Sîn-chhûn
Yue: Cantonese
- Yale Romanization: Sānchyūn
- Jyutping: san1 cyun1
- IPA: [sɐn˥.tsʰyn˥]

San Tsuen (Chinese: 新村; lit. 'New Village') is a village situated in the north eastern New Territories of Hong Kong, to the west of the town of Sha Tau Kok.

The village is inhabited by the Yau (邱, Hakka: k^{h}iu33) clan. It is a Hakka-speaking village.

San Tsuen was the village that linguist Henry Henne chose to source his informant Khjew Fuj (邱惠) for the Hakka dialect of Sha Tau Kok. He collected his information between July 1949 and April 1950.

== Administration ==
San Tsuen is a recognized village under the New Territories Small House Policy. It is one of the villages represented within the Sha Tau Kok District Rural Committee. For electoral purposes, San Tsuen is part of the Sha Ta constituency, which is currently represented by Ko Wai-kei.

San Tsuen is a recognized village under the New Territories Small House Policy.

== History ==
San Tsuen was served by the San Tsuen station of the former Sha Tau Kok Railway, which was in operation from 1911 to 1928. San Tsuen station was opened in February 1916.

== See also ==
- List of villages in Hong Kong
