= Yim Tso Ha =

Area and village in Hong Kong

Yim Tso Ha Chinese: 鹽灶下
- Area and village
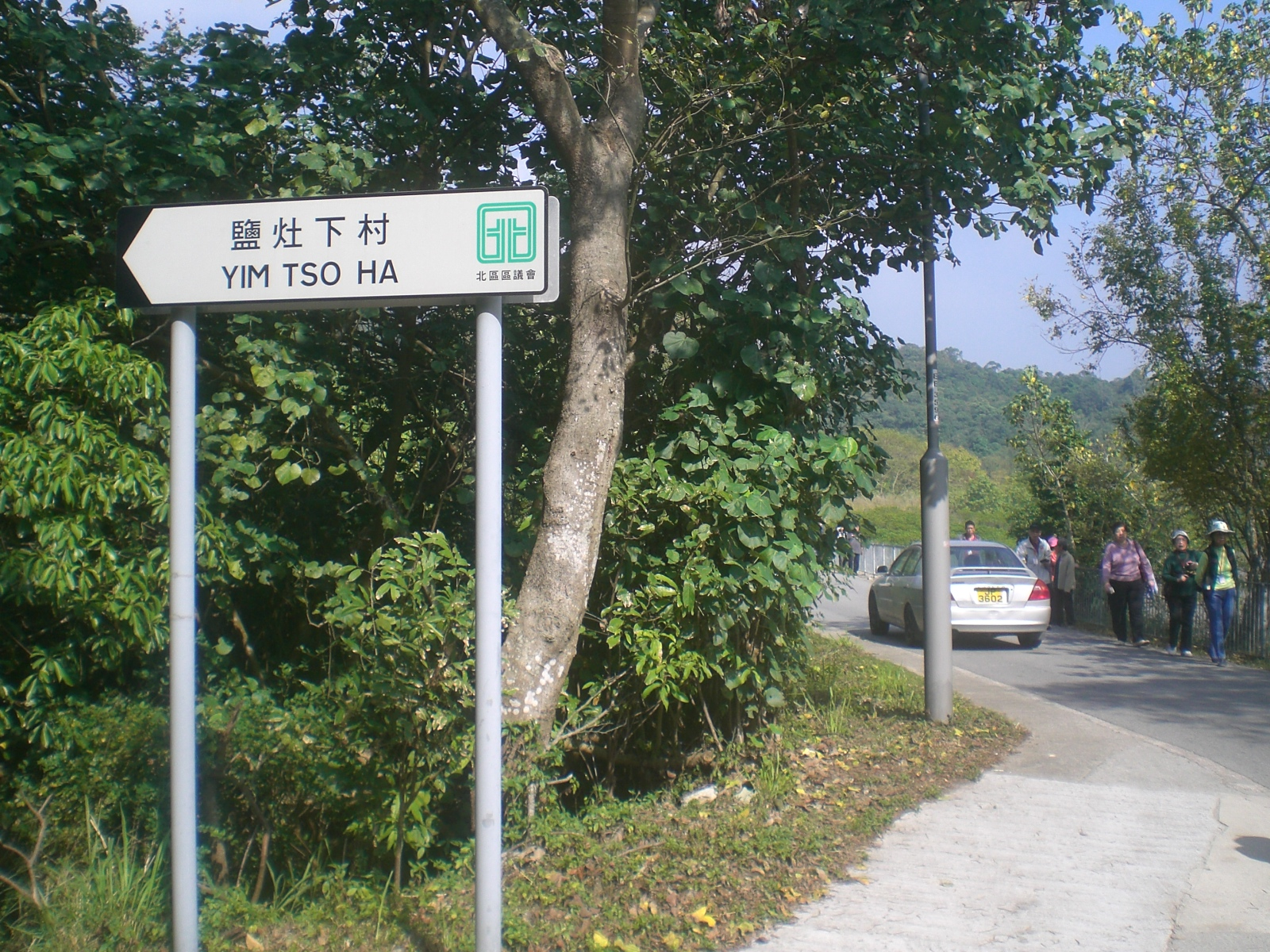
- Yim Tso Ha village sign along Luk Keng Road.

- Location within Hong Kong
- Coordinates: 22.53234°N 114.20695°E
- Country: People's Republic of China
- Special administrative region: Hong Kong
- District: North District
- Area: Sha Tau Kok
- Time zone: UTC+8:00 (HKT)

Yim Tso Ha (Chinese: 鹽灶下) is an area and a village in Sha Tau Kok, North District, Hong Kong.

== Administration ==
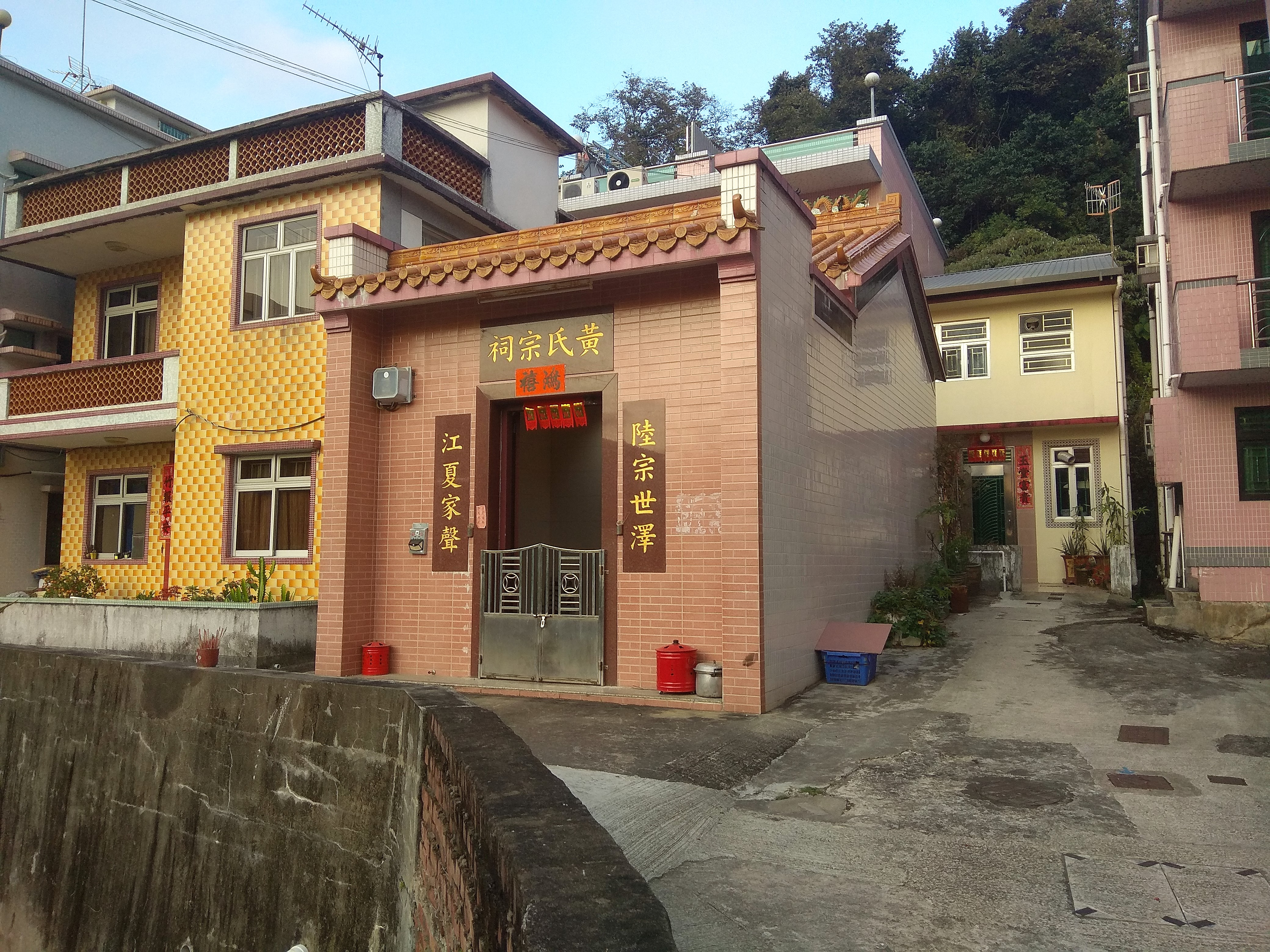
Wong Ancestral Hall in Yim Tso Ha.

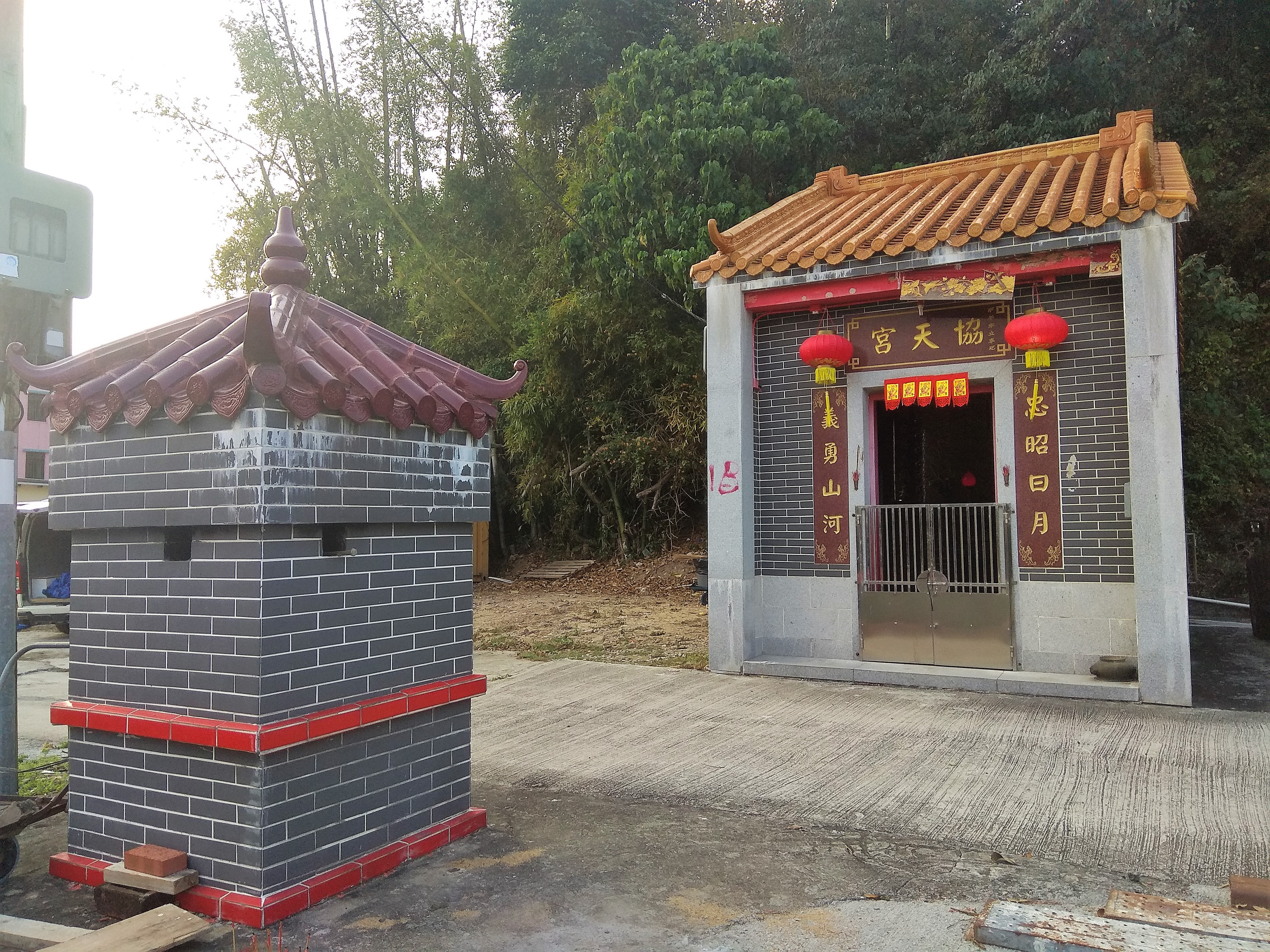
Hip Tin temple in Yim Tso Ha.

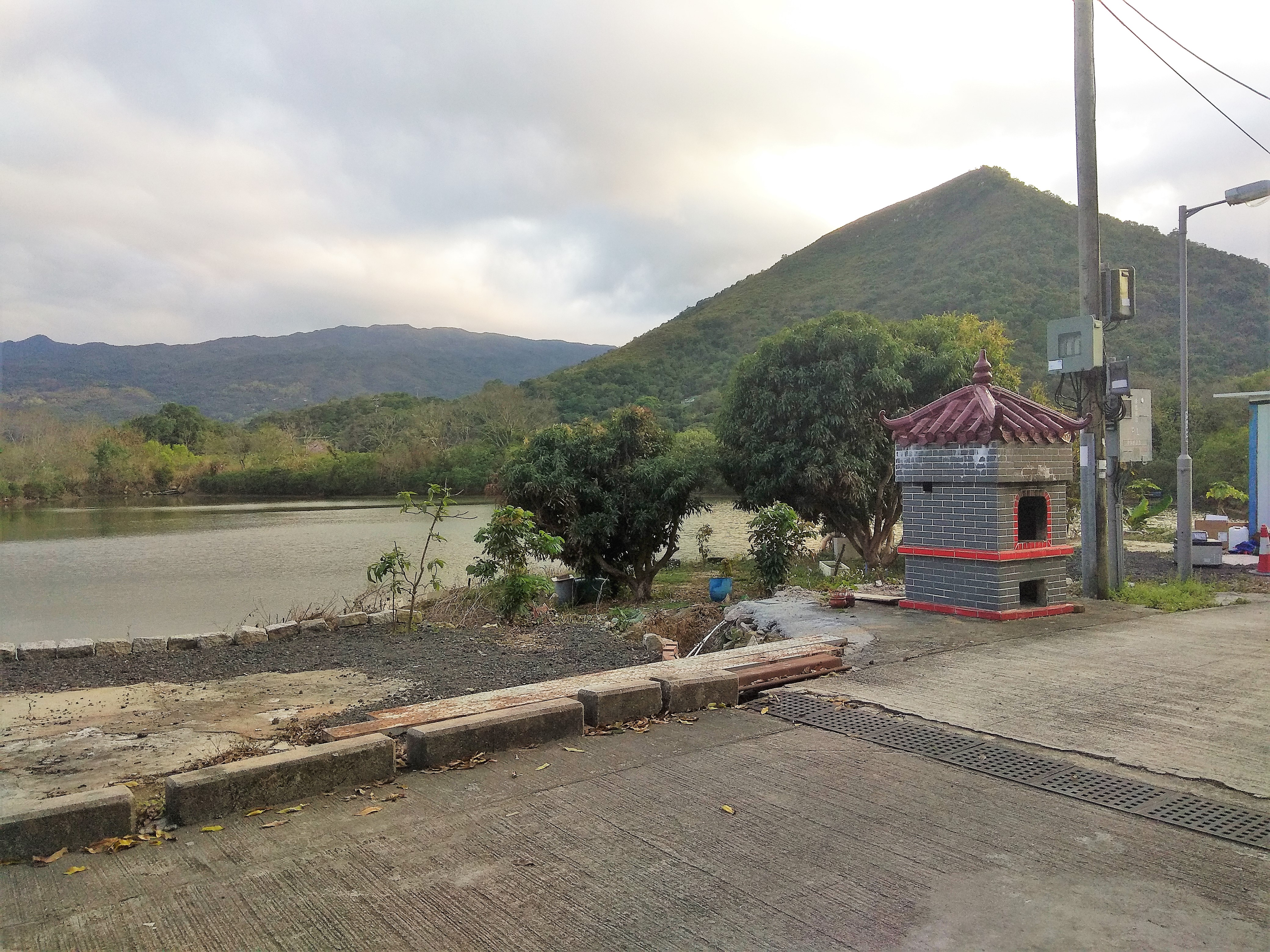
Pond near Yim Tso Ha.

Yim Tso Ha is a recognized village under the New Territories Small House Policy. It is one of the villages represented within the Sha Tau Kok District Rural Committee. For electoral purposes, Yim Tso Ha is part of the Sha Ta constituency, which is currently represented by Ko Wai-kei.

== History ==
The villages of Ma Tseuk Leng (upper and lower), Yim Tso Ha, Wu Shek Kok and Au Ha formed a yeuk (約), a form of oath-sworn, inter-village, mutual-aid alliance.

At the time of the 1911 census, the population of Yim Tso Ha was 47. The number of males was 18.

== Features ==
There is a Hip Tin temple in Yim Tso Ha.

== Fauna ==
In the past, Yim Tso Ha was the site of an egretry, with the earliest records dating back to 1958. The egretry has been abandoned since 1993 and it is believed that the birds that used to breed there have moved to A Chau. The Yim Tso Ha egretry was the first Site of Special Scientific Interest (SSSI) in Hong Kong, listed in 1975. At that time, it was the most important egretry in Hong Kong. Having been abandoned for a long period of time, the Yim Tso Ha Egretry SSSI was de-listed in March 2016.

== See also ==
- Pat Sin Leng Country Park
- Starling Inlet
- Pok Tau Ha
