= Tai Tong Wu =

Village in Sha Tau Kok, Hong Kong

Coordinates: 22.5208559°N 114.1757179°E

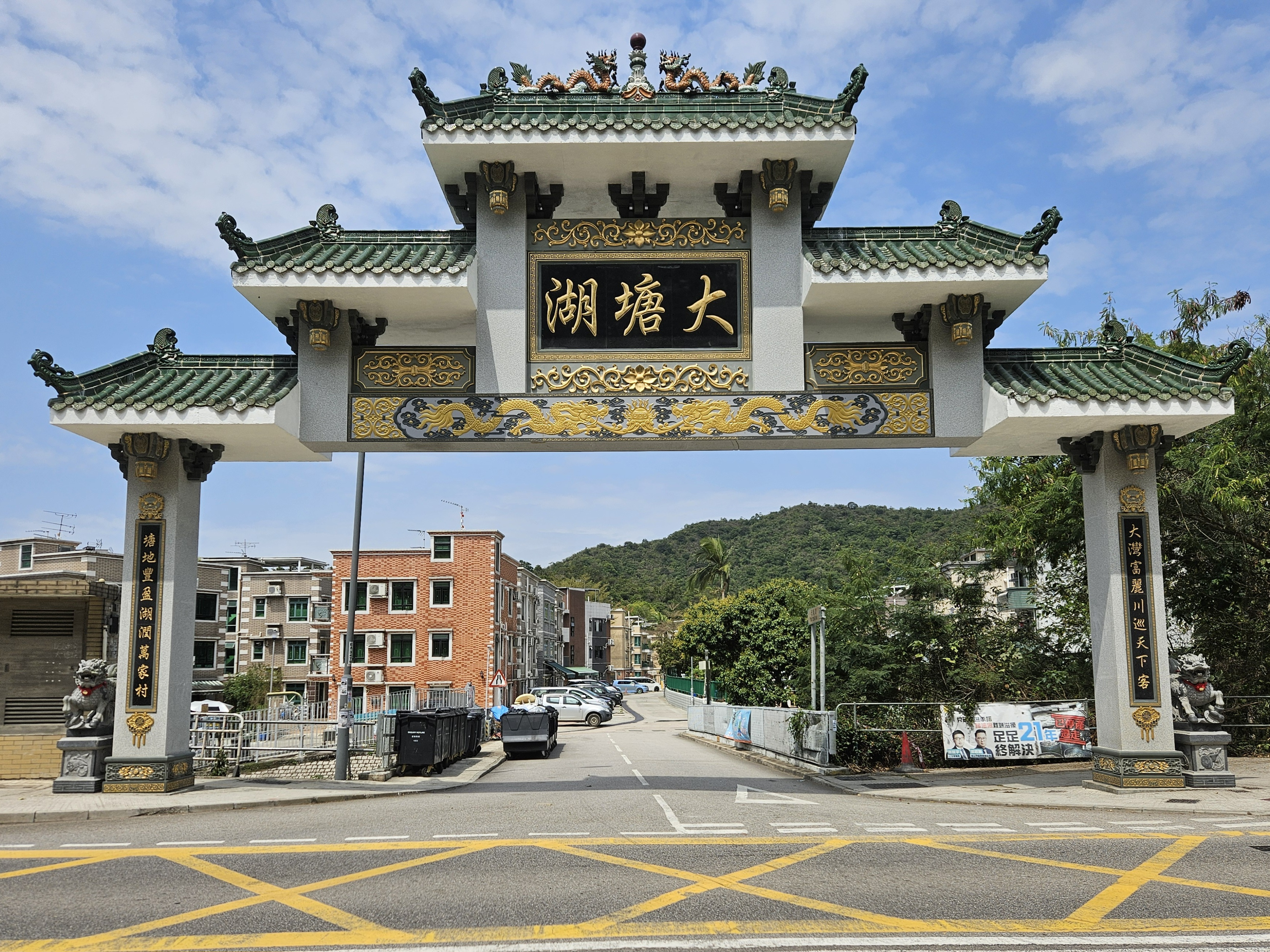
Paifang of Tai Tong Wu.

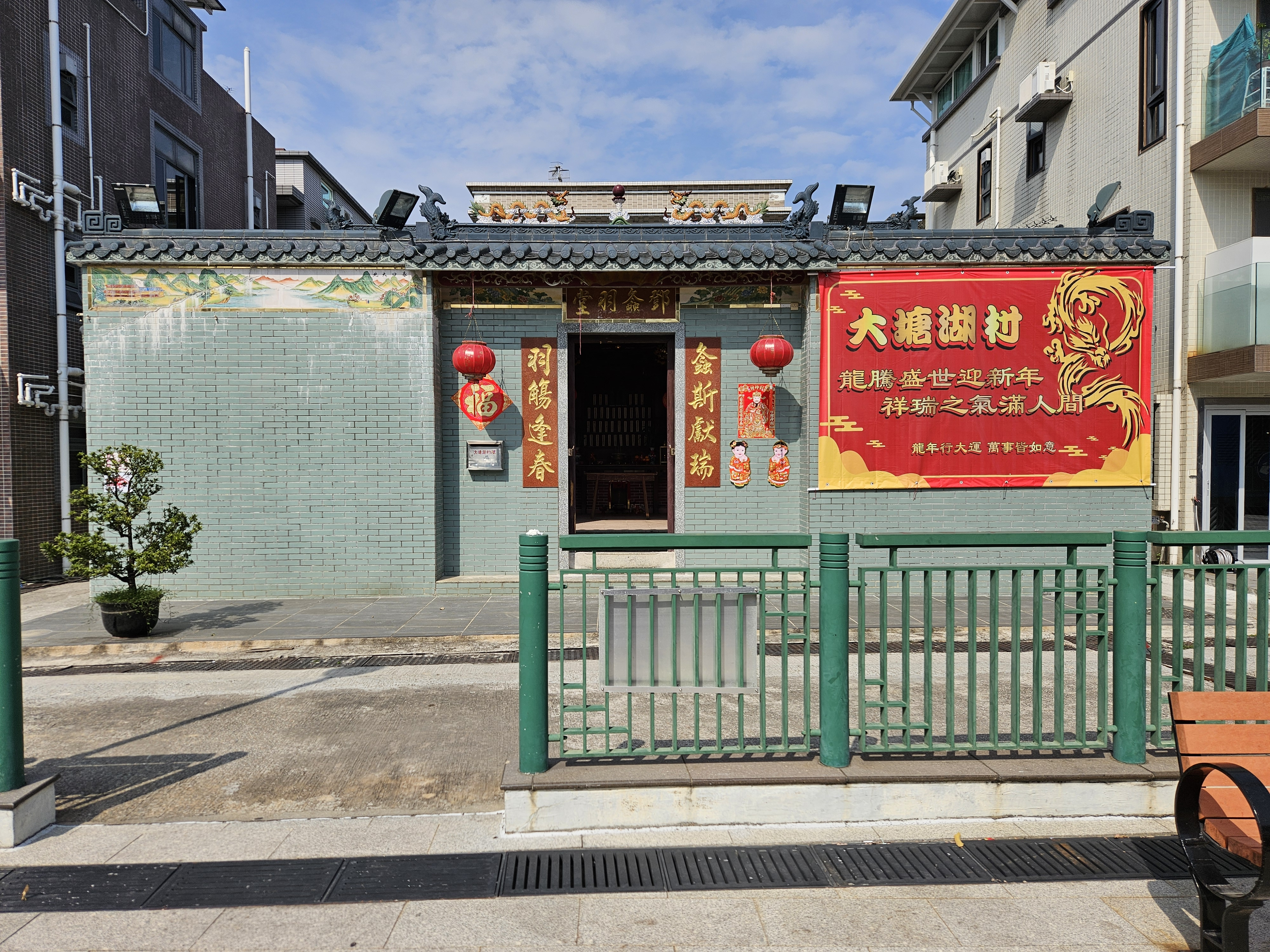
Tang Chung Yu Tong Ancestral Hall, Tai Tong Wu

Tai Tong Wu (Chinese: 大塘湖) is a village in Sha Tau Kok, North District, Hong Kong.

== Administration ==
Tai Tong Wu is a recognized village under the New Territories Small House Policy. It is one of the villages represented within the Sha Tau Kok District Rural Committee. For electoral purposes, Tai Tong Wu is part of the Sha Ta constituency, which is currently represented by Ko Wai-kei.
