= Wo Hang Tai Long =

Village in Hong Kong

Coordinates: 22.530851°N 114.198104°E

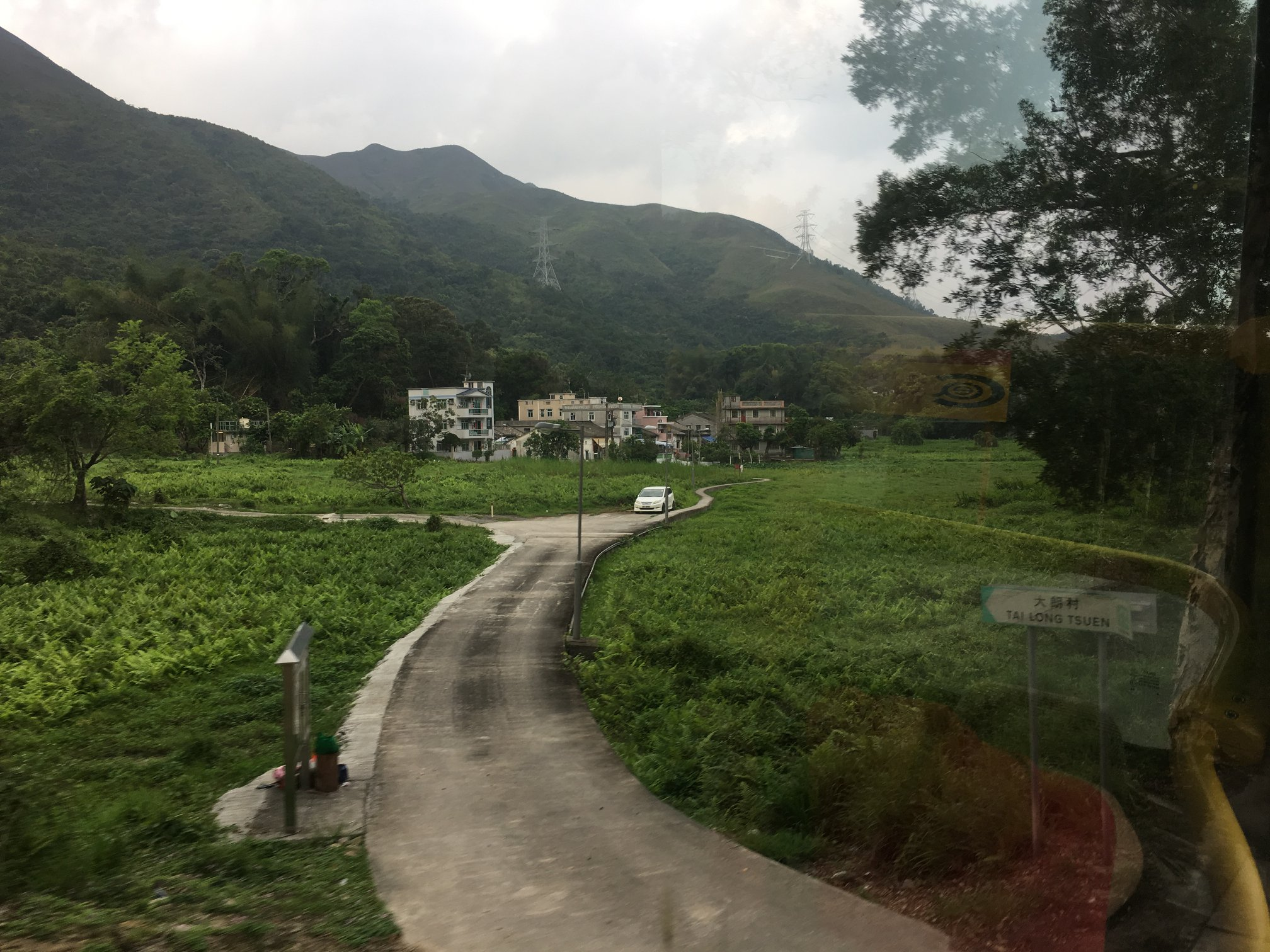
Wo Hang Tai Long

Wo Hang Tai Long (Chinese: 禾坑大朗) is a village in the Wo Hang, Sha Tau Kok area of North District of Hong Kong.

== Administration ==
Wo Hang Tai Long is a recognized village under the New Territories Small House Policy. It is one of the villages represented within the Sha Tau Kok District Rural Committee. For electoral purposes, Wo Hang Tai Long is part of the Sha Ta constituency, which is currently represented by Ko Wai-kei.

== History ==
At the time of the 1911 census, the population of Tai Long Tau was 46. The number of males was 20.

Wo Hang Tai Long was served by the Tai Long station of the former Sha Tau Kok Railway, which was in operation from 1911 to 1928. Tai Long station was opened in February 1916.
