= Sha Tau Kok Branch =

Former railway line in Hong Kong

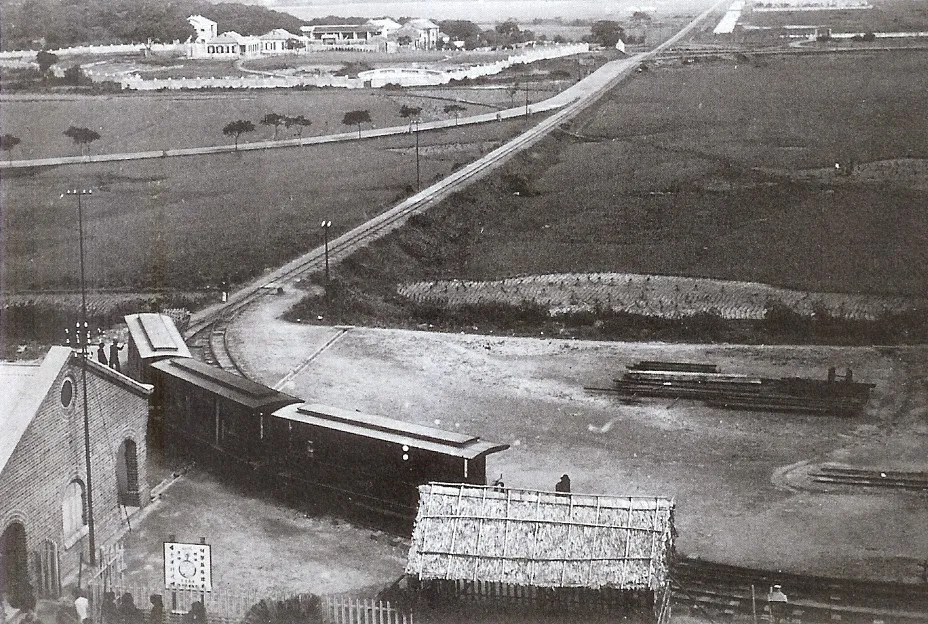
- Sha Tau Kok Railway viewed from Fanling station

Overview
- Native name: 沙頭角支綫
- Status: Closed
- Locale: Hong Kong
- Termini: Sha Tau Kok; Fanling

Service
- Type: Light rail
- Operator: Kowloon–Canton Railway (British section)
- Ridership: 82,505 (1924, annual)

History
- Opened: 21 December 1911
- Closed: 1 April 1928

Technical
- Line length: 7.25 mi (11.67 km)
- Track gauge: 2 ft (610 mm)
- Operating speed: 7.91 mph (12.73 km/h)

The Sha Tau Kok Branch (Chinese: 沙頭角支綫) was a 2 ft (610 mm) narrow-gauge light rail operated by the Kowloon–Canton Railway Corporation, running from Fanling to Sha Tau Kok in the northern New Territories of Hong Kong. It was 7.25 miles (11.67 km) long and had eight services a day. The time it took to travel from Fanling to Sha Tau Kok was 55 minutes.

== Background ==
Following the opening of KCR British Section in 1911, local authorities in Tai Po District Office proposed the construction of railway branch to boundary town Sha Tau Kok, which was likely to increase the revenue of mainline considering the stable movement of villagers between Sha Tau Kok Market and Sham Chun Market (now Shenzhen). The proposal was accepted by the Hong Kong Government on 28 April 1911.

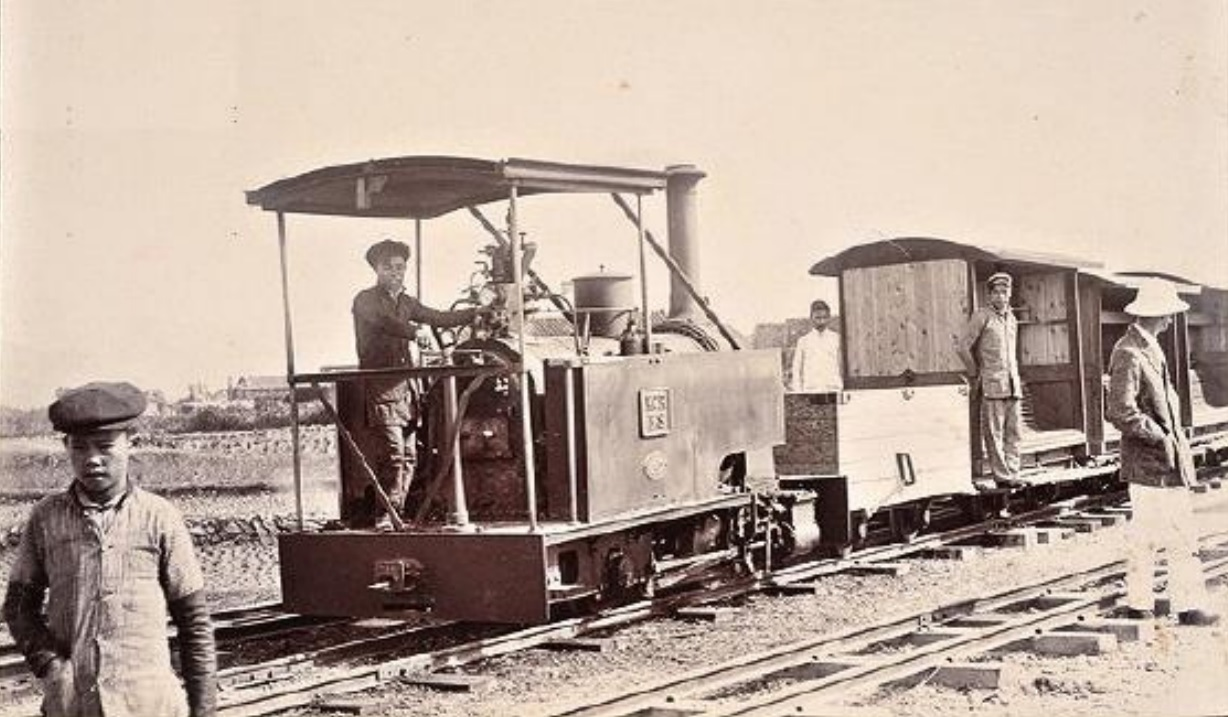
Narrow-gauge steam locomotive used during the construction and commissioning of the Sha Tau Kok Railway

The branch was built reusing the narrow gauge works railway tracks and rolling stock previously used to help construct the mainline. There were also plans to extend the branch south-westerly to Castle Peak, and the Hong Kong Government believed the Chinese Government could okay the extension to Mirs Bay.

== Service ==
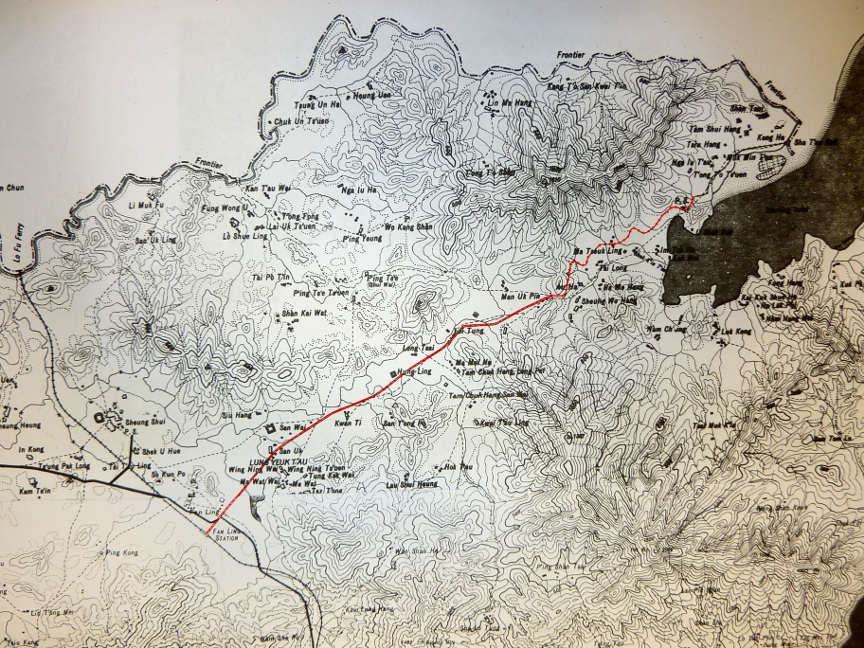
Sha Tau Kok railway alignment 1915

The line was opened to public in two phases, on 21 December 1911 from Fanling to Shek Chung Au, and on 1 April 1912 to Sha Tau Kok. The delay was the result of alignment disputes over concerns of fung shui.

The branch facilitated the officials travelling to Sha Tau Kok, and benefited the villagers in the region, and merchants and workers frequently crossing the Hong Kong–China border. The line was divided into four sections, between Fanling, Hung Leng, Wo Hing, Shek Chung Au, and Sha Tau Kok. The fare was five cents each section, and hence, for example, Fanling to Sha Tau Kok was 20 cents. A tramway system was adopted in February 1916, along with a new fare system of 2 cents from halt to halt.

The number of passengers peaked in 1924 with 82,505 in the particular year, and dropped significantly afterwards until the closure four years later.

== Closure ==
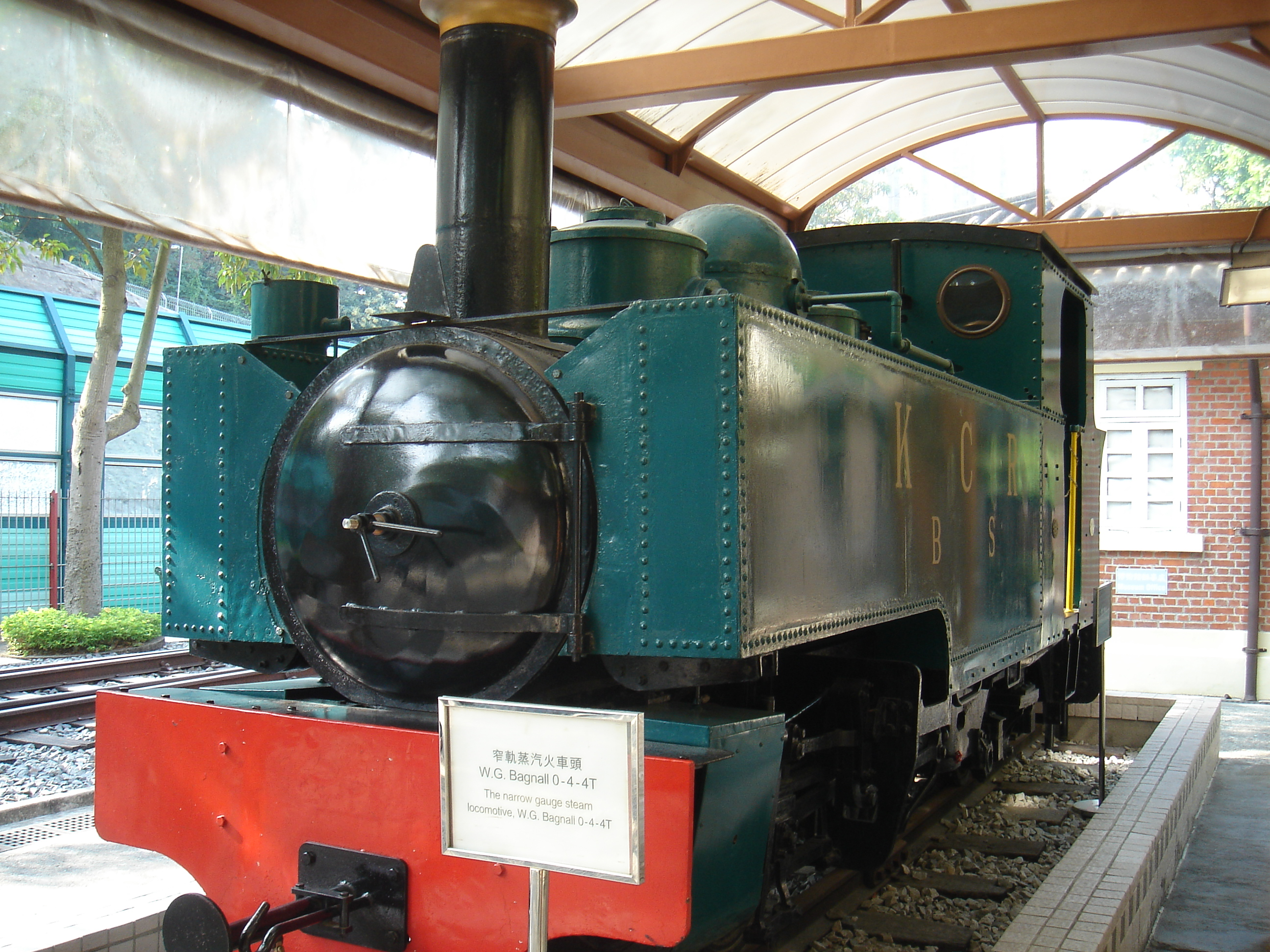
WG Bagnall built 0-4-4T steam locomotive, used on former Sha Tau Kok Branch Line

1922 seamen's strike and political instability forced the periodical suspension of train service, with trains not stopping Sha Tau Kok station occasionally in 1922 and 1923. Foreseeing the inevitable closing of branch after the decision to build Sha Tau Kok Road in 1923, the KCR Corporation kept the expenditure as low as possible, but the number of passenger carried ironically rose to a record high. 1925 Canton–Hong Kong strike further disturbed the operation of branch. Train service stopped between 11 January and 3 May 1926 according to KCR's official report.

The Sha Tau Kok Railway ceased operations on 1 April 1928, after only seventeen years of existence, under the government's order as a result of falling patronage and revenues due to competition from motor vehicles using the recently completed Sha Tau Kok Road. Railway tracks and buildings were demolished by June. Only the building of Hung Leng station is preserved amongst other stations as a proof of the railway's existence, while the Fanling station used by the KCR's mainline continues the service. Trenches previously used by rails can still be traced through the dense foliage of the countryside today.

After the closure, the two WG Bagnall built locomotives were sold to the North Negros Sugar Company of Iloilo in the Philippines. They were first used to transport cut sugar cane to nearby sugar mills, and later for track maintenance and shunting work. In 1990, they were decommissioned, and in 1995 acquired by the Kowloon-Canton Railway Corporation and brought back to Hong Kong. One was cosmetically restored and is now on display in the Hong Kong Railway Museum. The second was donated by the Corporation to the Phyllis Rampton Narrow Gauge Railway Trust in 2007. It is now in England for restoration to working condition and may run on the Vale of Rheidol Railway in Wales.

== Stations ==
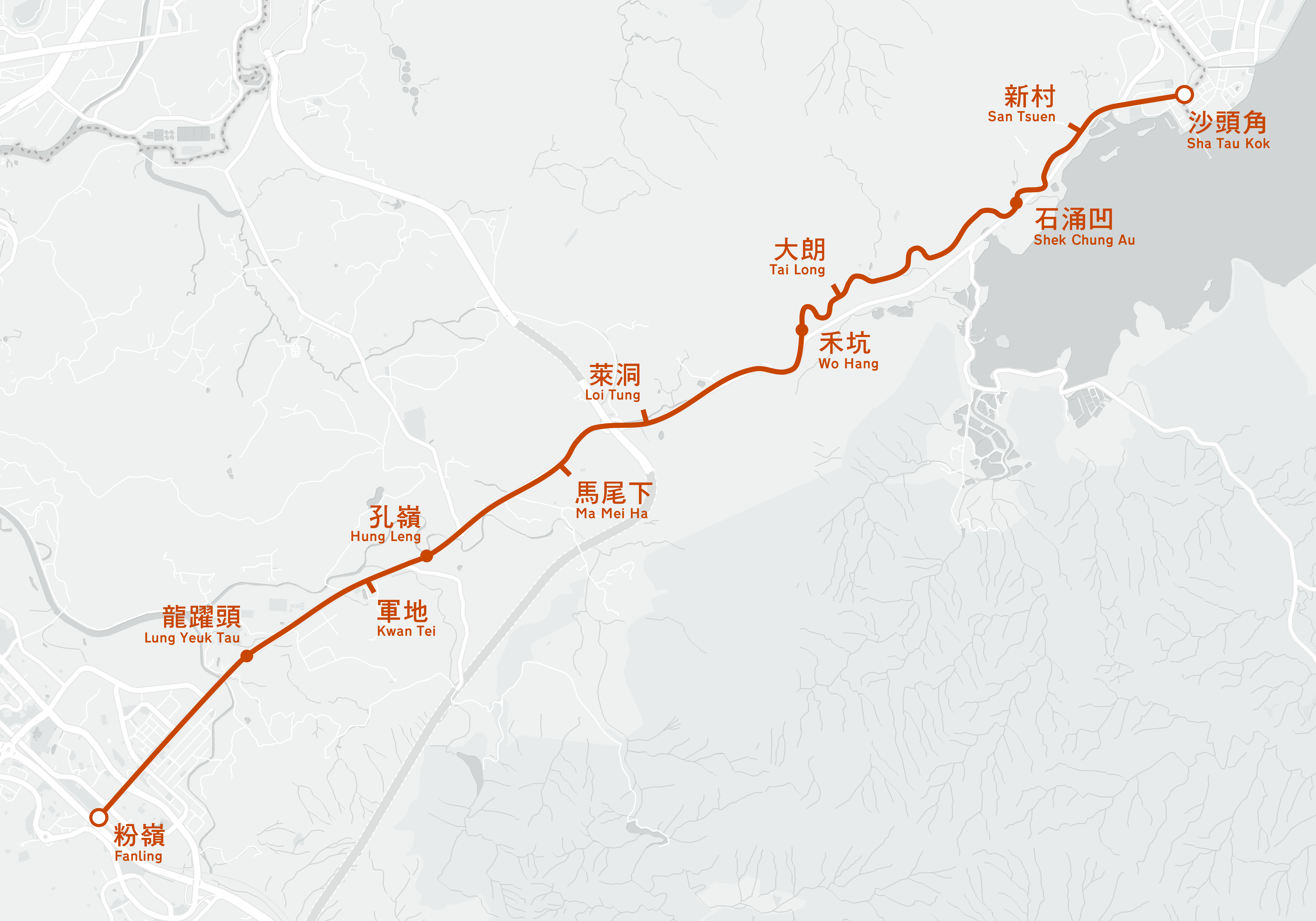
Map of Sha Tau Kok Railway under the modern road network (2022)

Sha Tau Kok Branch was a single-track railway, except passing loop at Wo Hang station and sidings at both termini, at 1.5 miles (near Wo Hang) and 4 miles (or at around 6 miles, near Shek Chung Au) from Fanling. For the first four miles from Fanling to a point close to the village of Au Ha the railway was constructed alongside and as part of a new road. From Au Ha to Sha Tau Kok the geography required that the line took its own less easy route, involving gradients as steep as 1:45 and curves of radius down to 150 feet (46 m).

Simple station buildings were constructed for the stations. Stations and halts of the Sha Tau Kok Railway are as follows:

Name		Type	Opening date	Location
English	Chinese	Type	Opening date	Location
Fanling	粉嶺	Terminus; Interchange for KCR mainline	21 December 1911; 1 October 1910 for mainline structure	Near 22.49275°N 114.13848°E
Lung Yeuk Tau	龍躍頭	Station	21 December 1911	Unclear
Kwan Tei also Kwan Ti	軍地	Stop/Halt	February 1916	Unclear
Hung Leng also Hung Ling and Kung Ling	孔嶺	Station	21 December 1911	22.511750°N 114.164532°E
Ma Mei Ha	馬尾下	Stop/Halt	February 1916	Unclear
Loi Tung also Lai Tung	萊洞	Stop/Halt	February 1916	Unclear
Wo Hang	禾坑	Station	21 December 1911	Near 22.528817°N 114.194823°E
Tai Long	大朗	Stop/Halt	February 1916	Unclear
Shek Chung Au	石涌凹	Station	21 December 1911	Near 22.538968°N 114.212069°E
San Tsuen	新村	Stop/Halt	February 1916	Unclear
Sha Tau Kok also Shataukok	沙頭角	Terminus	1 April 1912	Near 22.54587°N 114.22526°E

Lung Yeuk Tau station was likely to have closed before the branch ceased operation. The location of Wo Hang station and Shek Chung Au station, which the papers described as near to the police station, were confirmed by villagers, whilst both termini can be seen in aerial photos taken in 1924. Che Ping Street (Chinese: 車坪街; lit. 'Car Flatland Street') in Sha Tau Kok is named after the terminus.

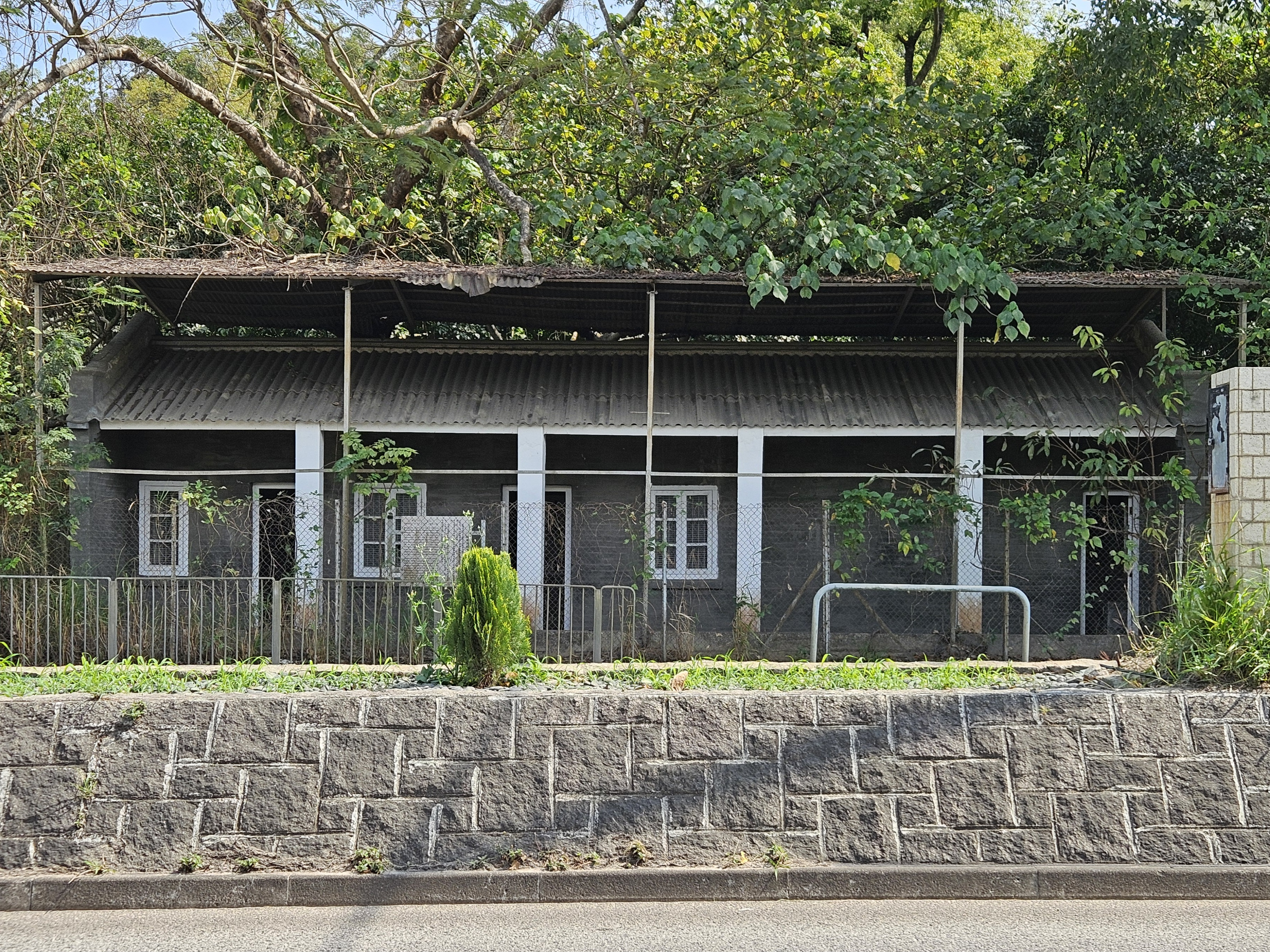
Former Hung Leng Station of the Sha Tau Kok Railway. All other stations of this railway have been demolished.

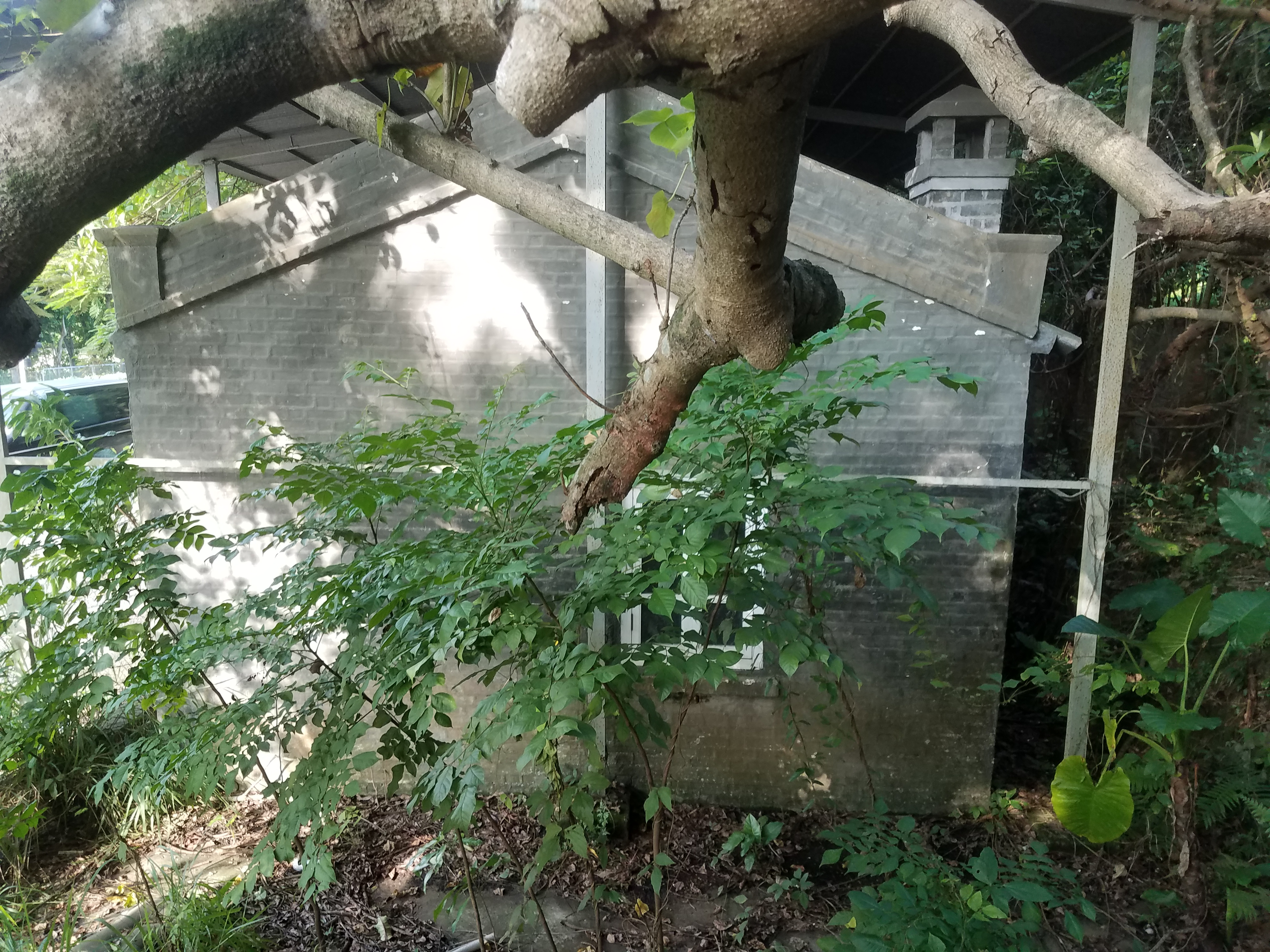
Side view of former Hung Leng Station.

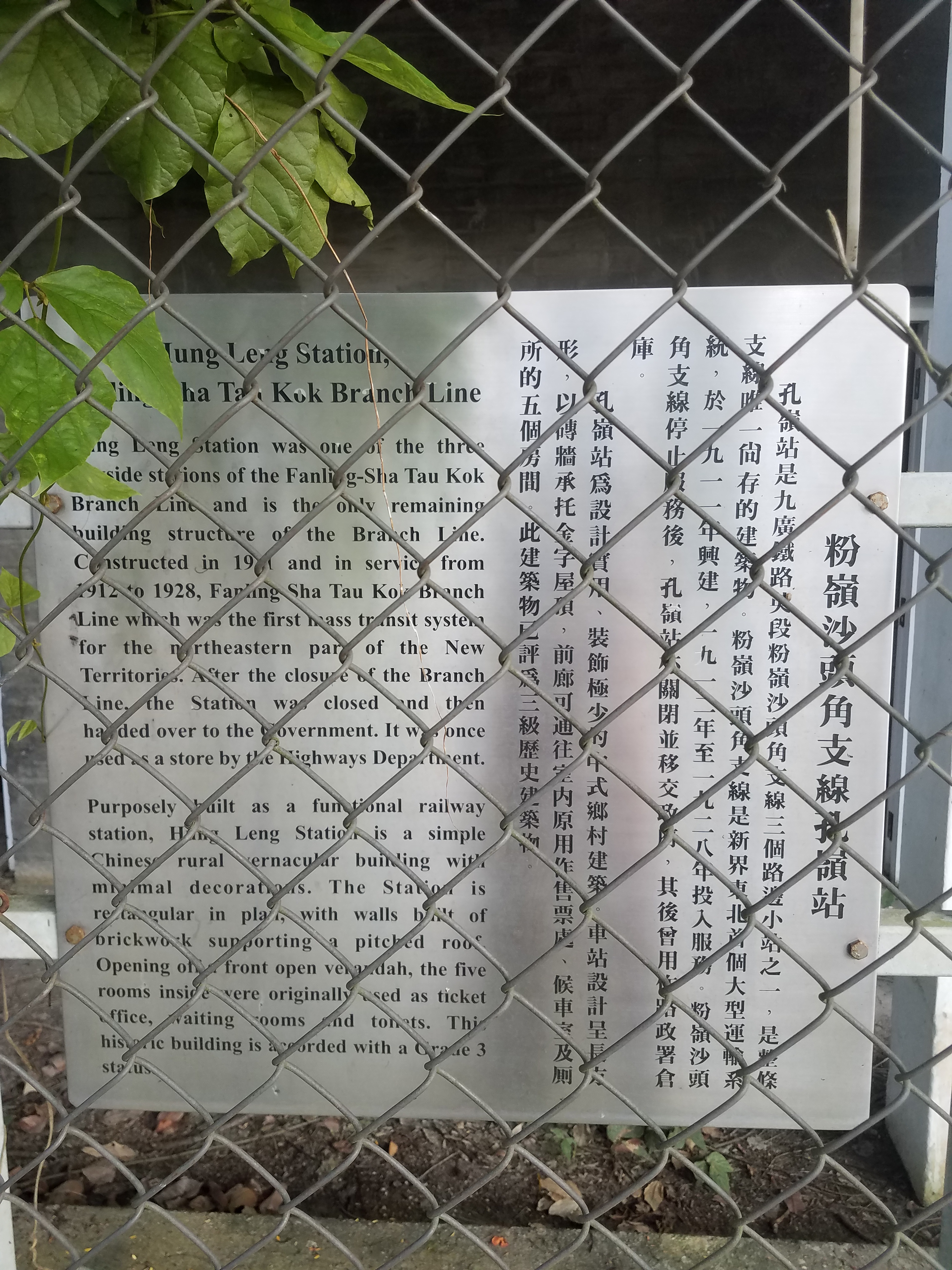
Information board at former Hung Leng Station.
