= Tong Fong =

Village in Ta Kwu Ling, North District, Hong Kong

Coordinates: 22.536950°N 114.151168°E

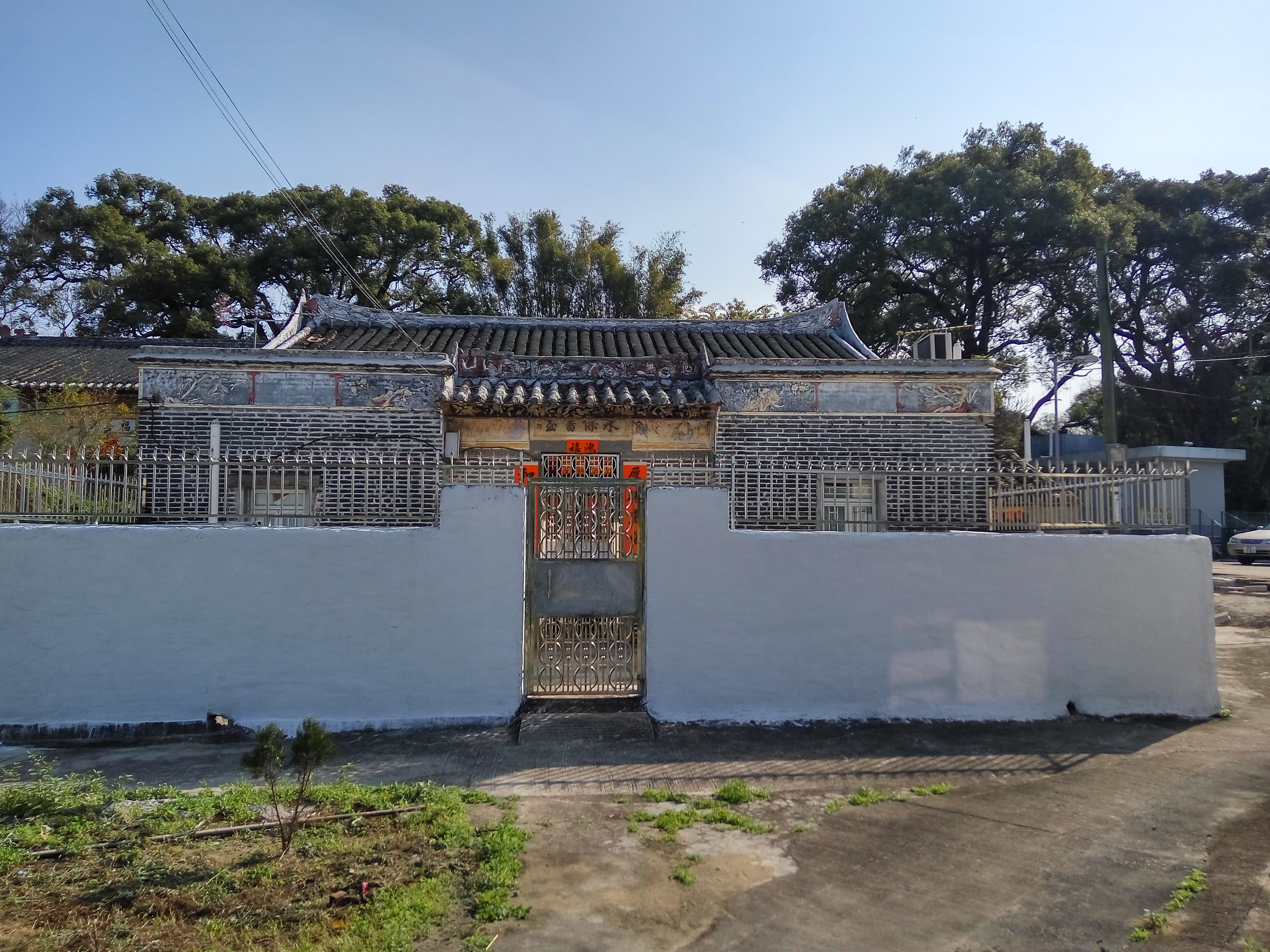
Wing Kit Study Hall in Tong Fong.

Tong Fong (Chinese: 塘坊) is a small village in Ta Kwu Ling, North District, Hong Kong.

== Administration ==
Tong Fong is a recognized village under the New Territories Small House Policy.

== History ==
The village of Man Uk Pin in North District was first settled in the late 17th century by the Man (萬) who came from Wuhua (五華) in Guangdong province. The Man later moved out of the village and stayed in Heung Yuen, Ping Che and Tong Fong nearby.

== Features ==
The Wing Kit Study Hall in Tong Fong has been listed as a Grade III historic building.
