= Henry Henne =

Norwegian linguist (1918–2002)

Henry Henne (21 October 1918 – 29 June 2002) was a Norwegian linguist.

Henne was born in Bergen, and grew up in Solheimsviken, as a son of Halvar Henne (1894–1965) and Marie Bjørkly (1884–1959). He was married twice, the second time to an American citizen.

Henne finished his secondary education in 1938. He studied different languages on his own, and during the Second World War he received private tuition in Russian language from professors Christian Schweigaard Stang and Erik Krag. He received a Rockefeller Foundation grant in 1946 to study the Chinese language under Bernhard Karlgren in Sweden, and Henne graduated with the fil.kand. degree from the Stockholm University College in 1948, and went to South China to study further. He made a name studying Hakka Chinese, and later learnt Japanese, Korean, Vietnamese and Thai in Japan and the United States. He was a research fellow at the University of Oslo from 1952 to 1956, before taking the fil.lic. degree at Stockholm University College in 1958. He was a professor at the International Christian University, Tokyo from 1958 to 1963, at Cornell University from 1963 to 1965, at the International Christian University, Tokyo from 1965 to 1966, at the University of Oslo from 1966 to 1981 and the University of Bergen from 1981 to 1988. He then worked with Japanese tuition at the Norwegian School of Economics and Business Administration from 1988 to 1992.

Henne was the chairman of the Institute for Comparative Research in Human Culture from 1975 to 1986 and a board member of the Central Nordic Institute of Asian Studies from 1967 to 1988. He was a member of the Norwegian Academy of Science and Letters from 1970 and the Royal Danish Academy of Sciences and Letters from 1979, and was decorated with the Order of the Rising Sun in 1988. He died in 2002.

== See also ==
- San Tsuen
