= Robin's Nest (Hong Kong) =

Mountain in New Territories, Hong Kong

- 紅花嶺
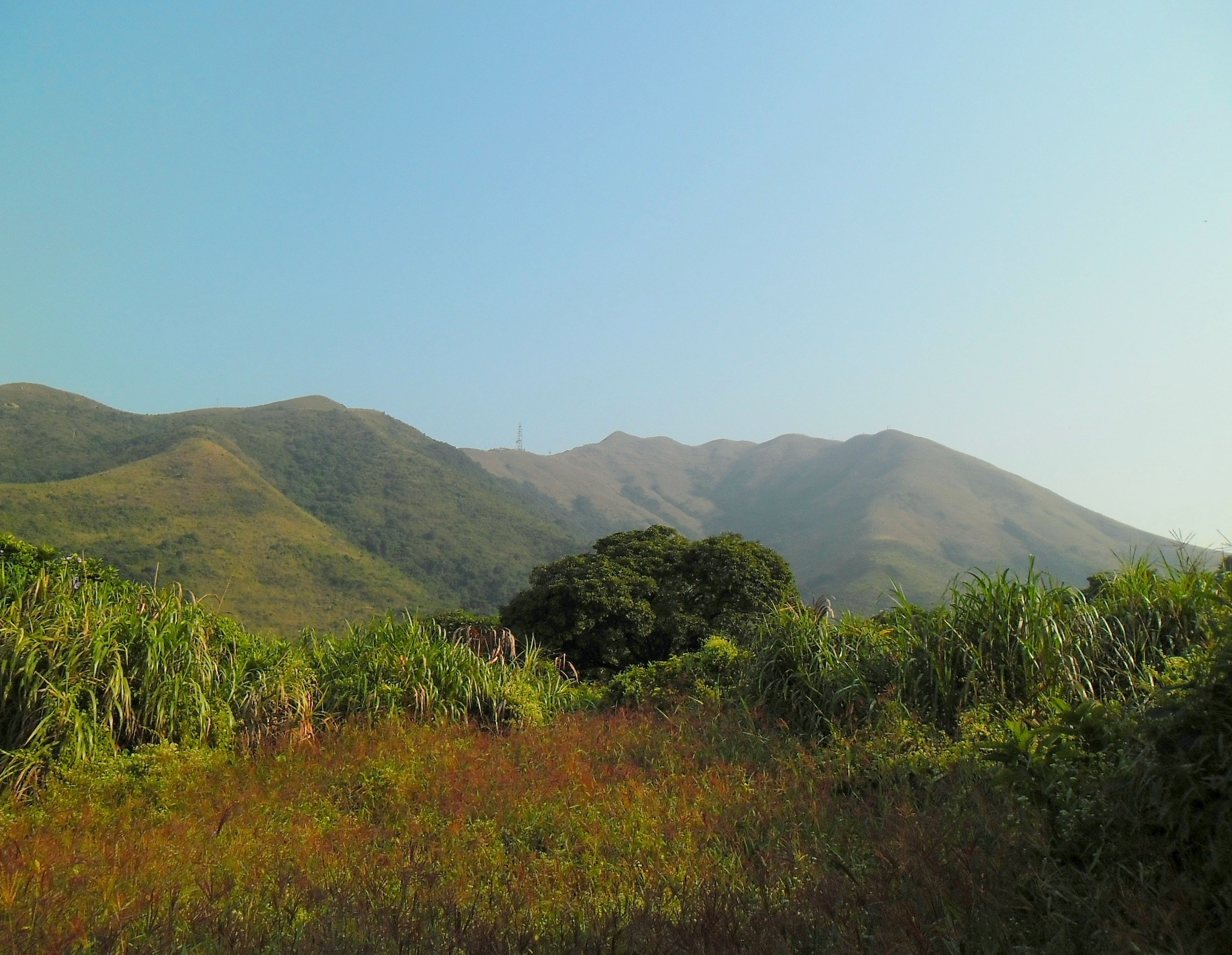
- Robin's Nest, as viewed from the Man Uk Pin Village near Sha Tau Kok.

Highest point
- Elevation: 492 m (1,614 ft)
- Coordinates: 22°32′29″N 114°11′24″E

Geography
- Location within Hong Kong
- Location: Eastern New Territories, Hong Kong

Robin's Nest (Chinese: 紅花嶺; Jyutping: Hung4 Faa1 Leng5 (former name:麻雀嶺)) is a hill located in Robin's Nest Country Park, northeastern Hong Kong, south of the border between Hong Kong and Shenzhen in the New Territories. Robin's Nest is the 55th tallest hill in Hong Kong.

The name Hung Fa Leng (紅花嶺) does not translate directly as 'Robin's Nest' but as 'Red Flower Ridge'.

== New Country Park ==
In 2017, the Hong Kong Government announced that it was planning to designate the area surrounding Robin's Nest as a country park, called Robin's Nest Country Park. This proposed designation was made in June 2019. As of 2021, the final legislative work on the designation is still in progress. On March 1, 2024, Robin's Nest Country Park was officially established, becoming Hong Kong's 25th Country Park.

== See also ==
- Hung Fa Chai, a nearby hill
- List of mountains, peaks and hills in Hong Kong
- Ma Tseuk Leng (麻雀嶺), a nearby area and village, which has the same name as the former Chinese name of Robin's Nest
- Lin Ma Hang, a village with an old abandoned lead mine and MacIntosh Fort below Robin's Nest
