= Pok Tau Ha =

Village in Hong Kong

Coordinates: 22.531383°N 114.209036°E

Pok Tau Ha (Chinese: 膊頭下) is a village in the Sha Tau Kok area of North District of Hong Kong.

== Features ==
The Pok Tau Ha Old Lime Kiln (膊頭下古石灰窰) is listed as a "Site of Archaeological Interest".

== See also ==
- Yim Tso Ha
