= Wu Shek Kok =

Village in North District, Hong Kong

Wu Shek Kok Chinese: 烏石角
- Village
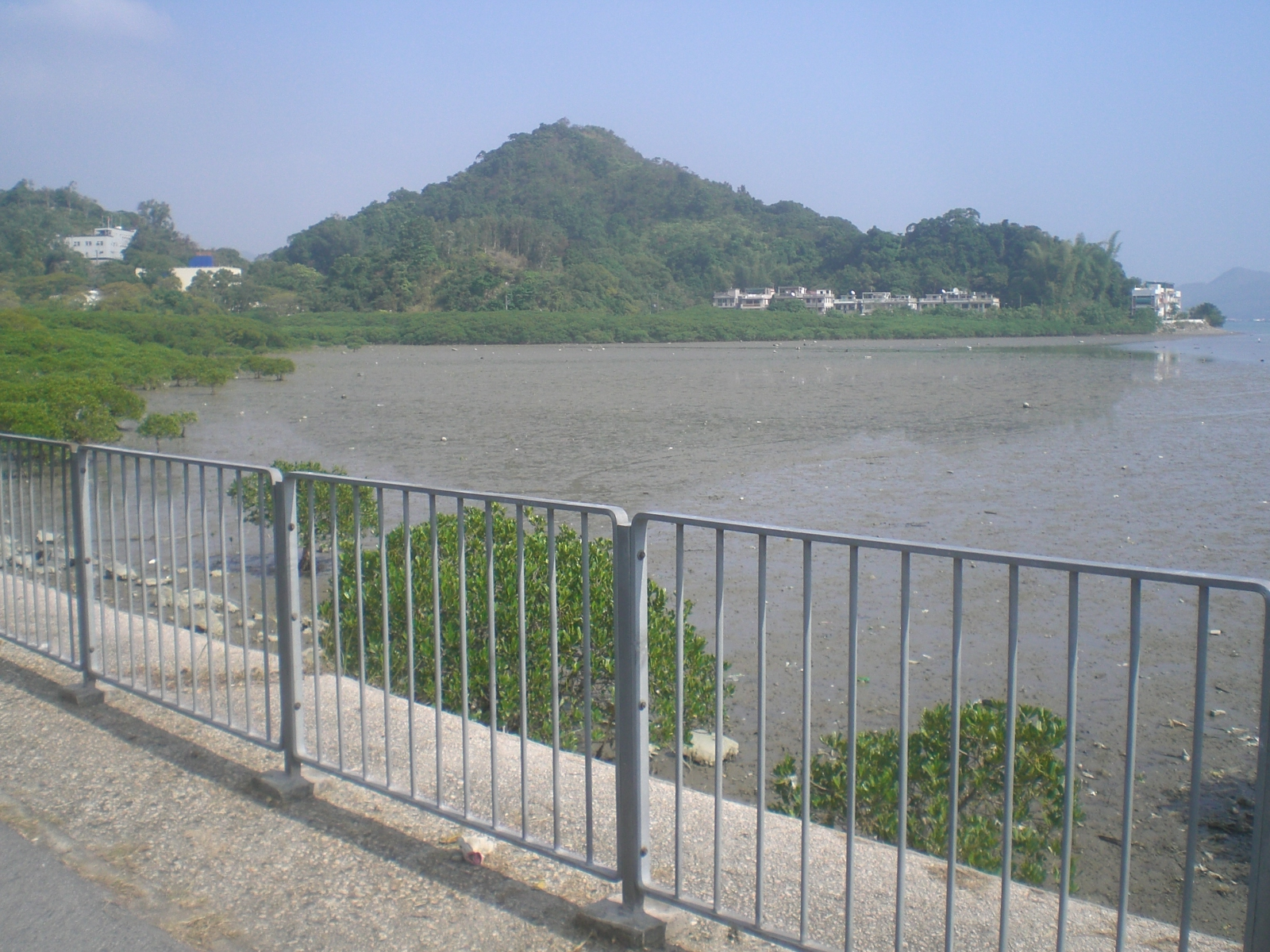
- Wu Shek Kok and Starling Inlet seen from Luk Keng Road.

- Location within Hong Kong
- Coordinates: 22.534855°N 114.211598°E
- Country: People's Republic of China
- Special administrative region: Hong Kong
- District: North District
- Area: Sha Tau Kok
- Time zone: UTC+8:00 (HKT)

Wu Shek Kok (Chinese: 烏石角) is a village in Sha Tau Kok, North District, Hong Kong.

== Administration ==
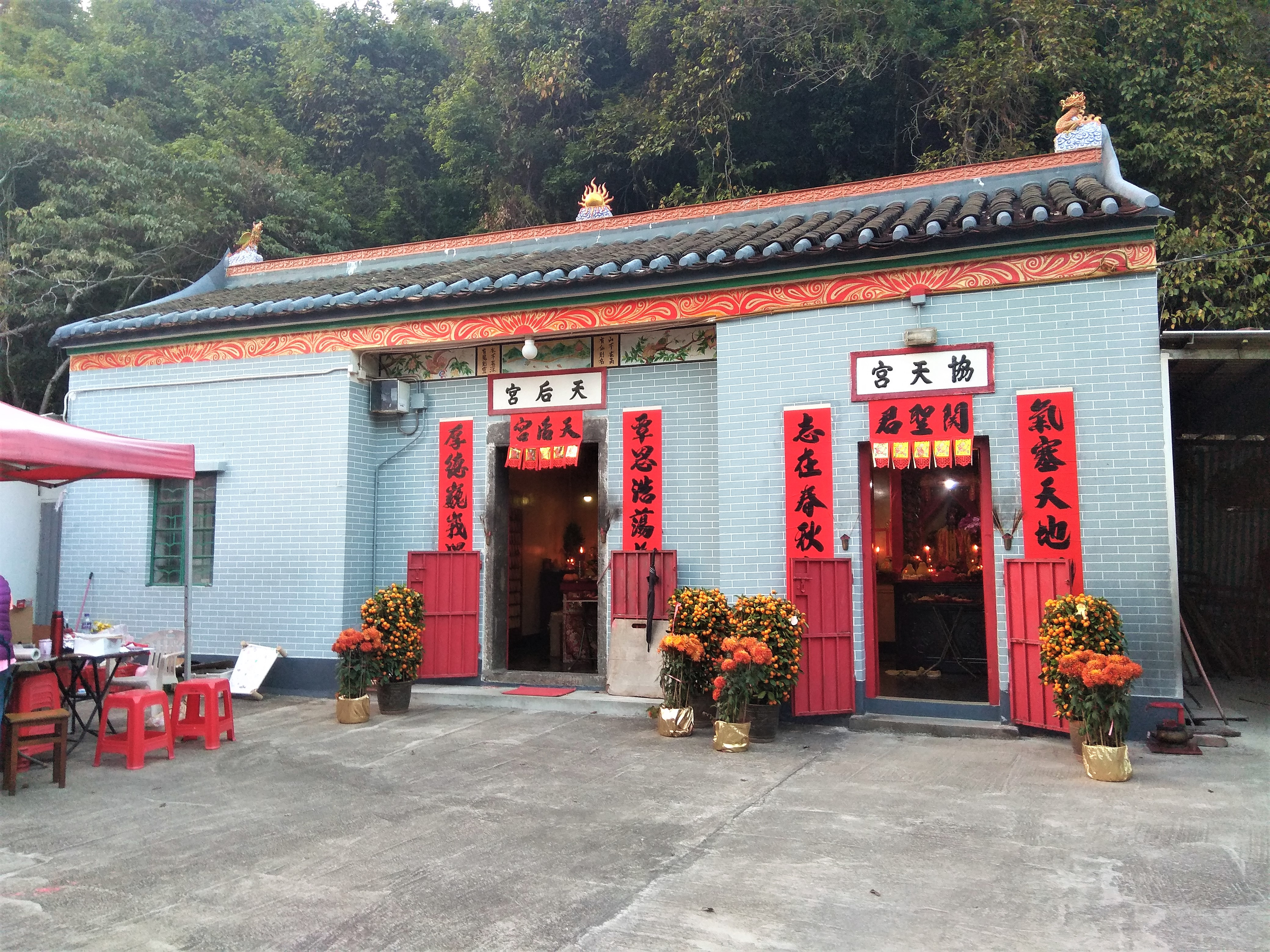
Tin Hau Temple in Wu Shek Kok. The right part of the building houses a Hip Tin Temple.

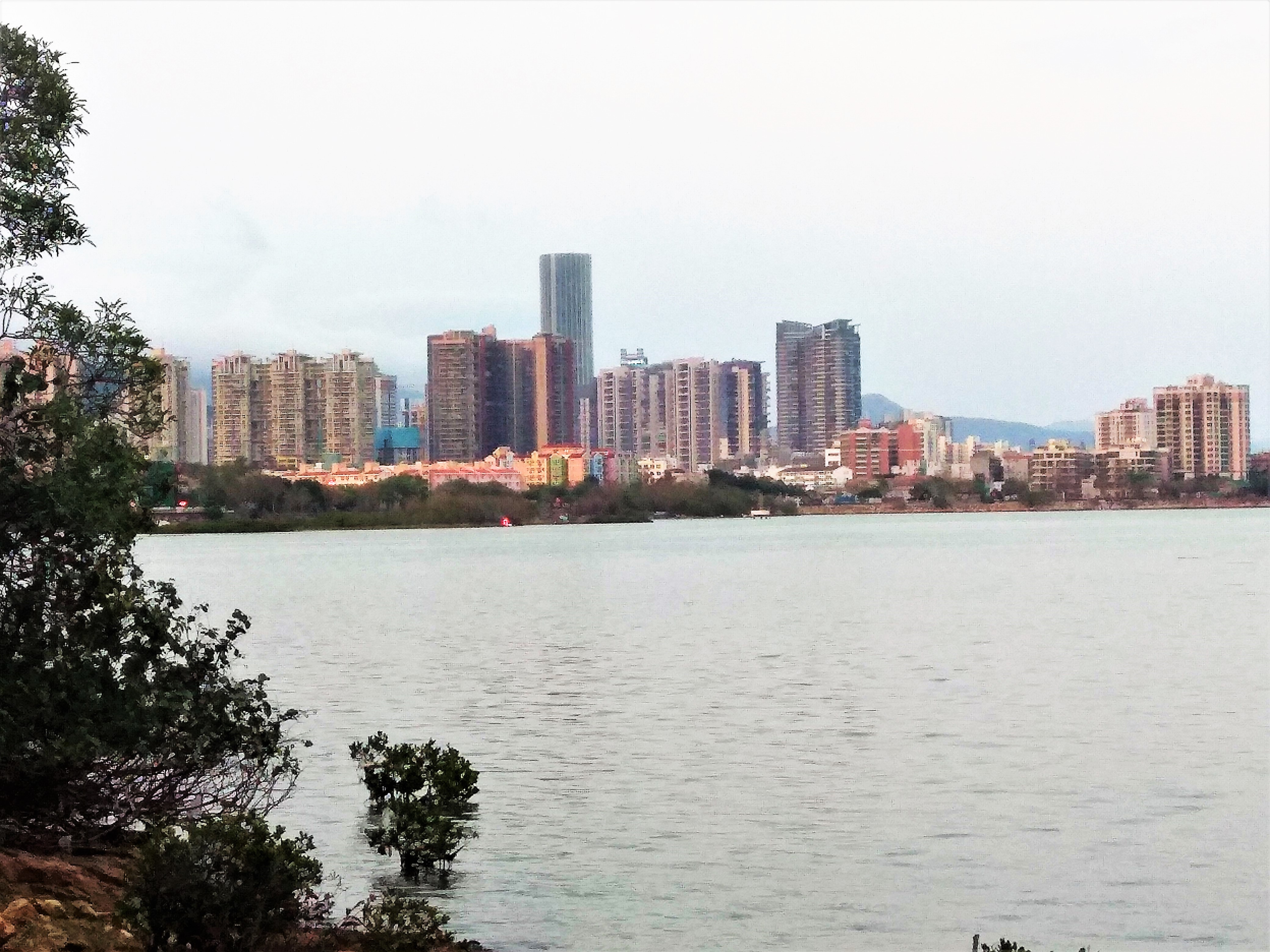
View of Shenzhen from Wu Shek Kok.

Wu Shek Kok is a recognized village under the New Territories Small House Policy. It is one of the villages represented within the Sha Tau Kok District Rural Committee. For electoral purposes, Wu Shek Kok is part of the Sha Ta constituency, which is currently represented by Ko Wai-kei.

== History ==
The villages of Ma Tseuk Leng (upper and lower), Yim Tso Ha, Wu Shek Kok and Au Ha formed a yeuk (約), a form of oath-sworn, inter-village, mutual-aid alliance.

== Features ==
There is a Tin Hau temple in Wu Shek Kok.

Japanese World War II military facilities are located on a hill at Wu Shek Kok.

== See also ==
- Starling Inlet
