= Ha Wo Hang =

Village in Hong Kong

Coordinates: 22.527322°N 114.198658°E

- Traditional Chinese: 下禾坑
- Cantonese Yale: hah wòh hāang
Transcriptions
Yue: Cantonese
- Yale Romanization: hah wòh hāang
- Jyutping: haa6 wo4 haang1

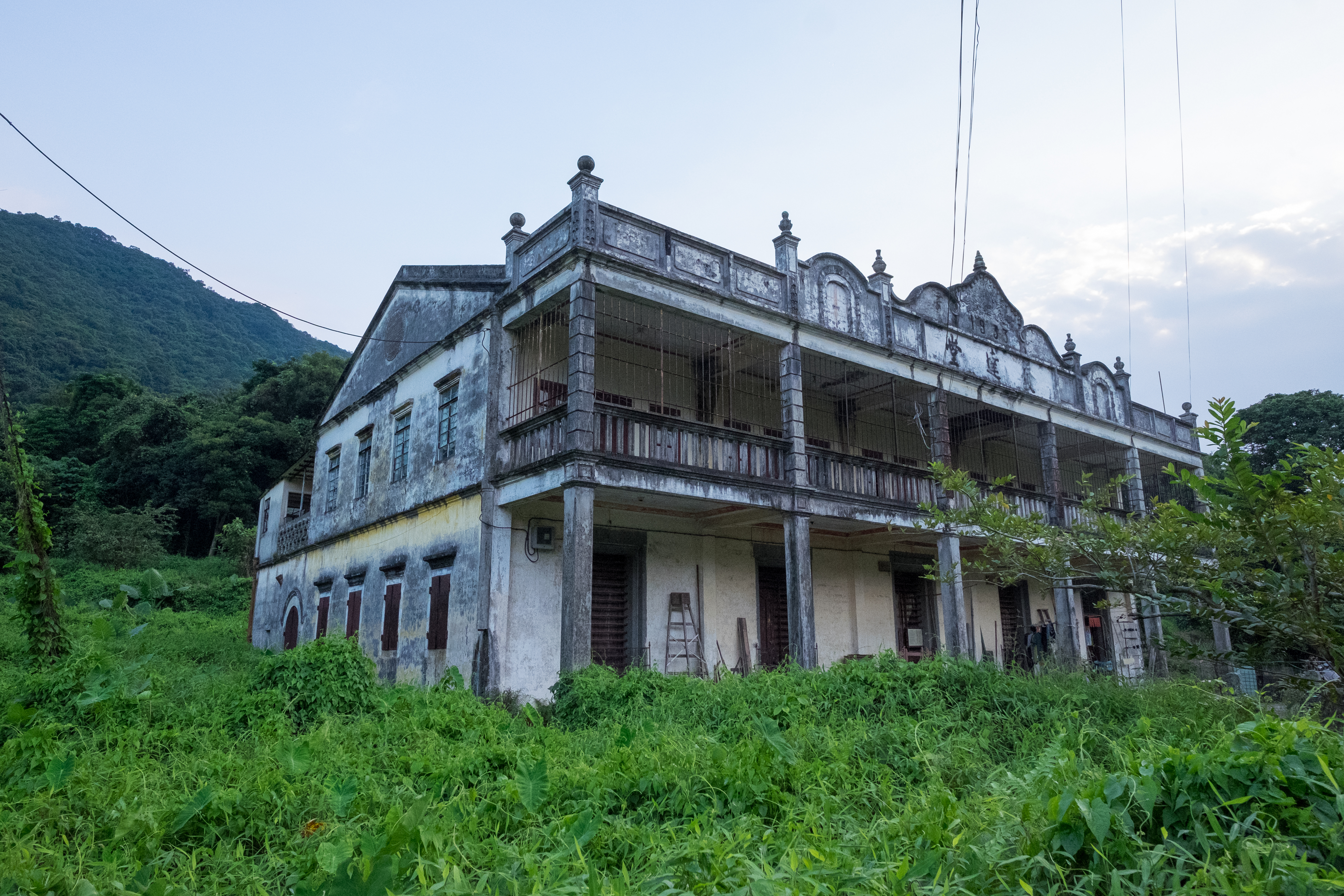
Fat Tat Tong in Ha Wo Hang

Ha Wo Hang (Chinese: 下禾坑; lit. 'lower Wo Hang', with Wo Hang meaning "valley of rice") is a village in Wo Hang, Sha Tau Kok, in the North District of Hong Kong. Part of the village is a walled village.

== Administration ==
Ha Wo Hang is a recognized village under the New Territories Small House Policy. It is one of the villages represented within the Sha Tau Kok District Rural Committee. For electoral purposes, Ha Wo Hang is part of the Sha Ta constituency, which is currently represented by Ko Wai-kei.

== History ==
Ha Wo Hang was established in 1730 by members of the Hakka Li Clan, branching out from the nearby village of Sheung Wo Hang.

At the time of the 1911 census, the population of Ha Wo Hang was 160. The number of males was 66.

== Built heritage ==
Fat Tat Tong (發達堂), at Nos. 1–5, was built in 1933. It is a Grade I historic building.

== See also ==
- Walled villages of Hong Kong
