= Wo Hang =

Wo Hang (Chinese: 禾坑; lit. 'valley of rice') is an area and a valley in Sha Tau Kok, in the North District of Hong Kong.

== History ==
Wo Hang was served by the Wo Hang station of the former Sha Tau Kok Railway, which was in operation from 1911 to 1928. Wo Hang station was opened on 21 December 1911.

== Features ==
Several villages are located in the area, including:

- Ha Wo Hang
- Sheung Wo Hang, known as 'Wo Hang' until the 18th century
- Wo Hang Tai Long
