= Robin's Nest Country Park =

Park in Hong Kong

- Interactive map of Robin's Nest Country Park
- Type: Country park
- Location: North District, New Territories, Hong Kong
- Coordinates: 22°32′35″N 114°11′53″E
- Area: 530 hectares (1,300 acres; 2.0 mi^{2}; 5.3 km^{2})
- Created: 1 March 2024

Robin's Nest Country Park (Chinese: 紅花嶺郊野公園) (established 1 March 2024) is a country park, located in northeastern New Territories, Hong Kong. It consists of approximately 530 hectares of land, including Robin's Nest.

== Wildlife and vegetation ==
The area is specially noted for natural habitats including secondary woodland, shrubland and upland grassland. Many species of high conservation value, such as red azalea, incense tree, Chinese grassbird and Chinese pipistrelle can be found.

== See also ==
- Geography of Hong Kong
- Conservation in Hong Kong
- List of places in Hong Kong
