= Sha Tau Kok Road =

Road in Hong Kong

Coordinates: 22°32′04″N 114°12′28.2″E

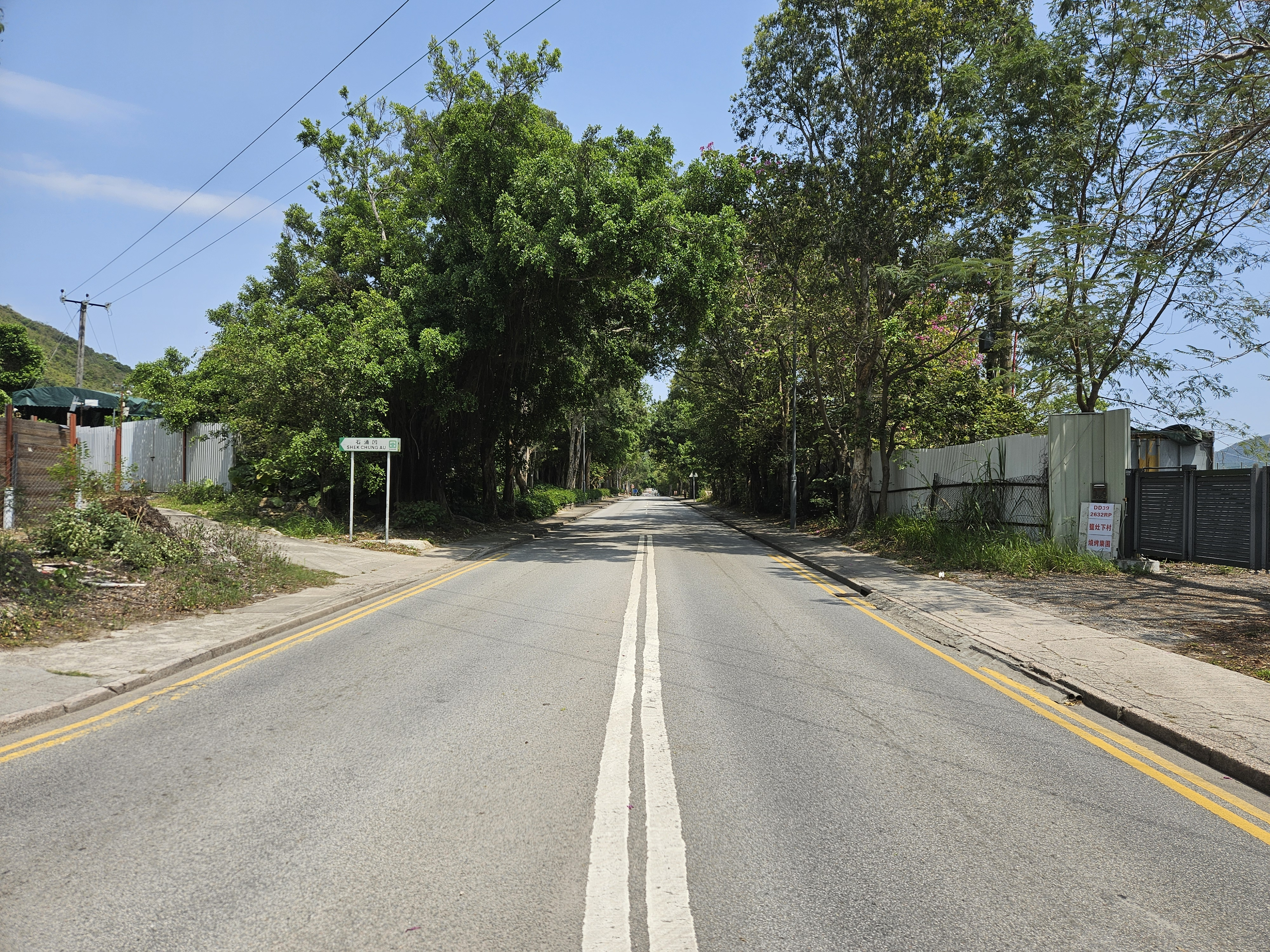
Sha Tau Kok Road – Shek Chung Au

Sha Tau Kok Road (Chinese: 沙頭角公路) is a road connecting the towns of Sha Tau Kok and Fanling in the New Territories, Hong Kong. It is the only road access to Sha Tau Kok from the rest of Hong Kong since its construction in 1927. The road replaced Sha Tau Kok Railway to handle transport between the two areas.

== See also ==
- List of streets and roads in Hong Kong
- Shek Chung Au
