= Sha Ta (constituency) =

Hong Kong constituency

- Elected constituency for the North District Council
- Boundary of Sha Ta in North District
- District: North
- Legislative Council constituency: New Territories North
- Population: 17,305 (2019)
- Electorate: 9,207 (2019)

Current constituency
- Created: 1982
- Number of members: One
- Member: Ko Wai-kei (DAB)

Sha Ta (Chinese: 沙打) is one of the 18 constituencies in the North District, Hong Kong.

The constituency returns one district councillor to the North District Council, with an election every four years.

Sha Ta constituency has an estimated population of 17,305.

== Councillors represented ==
Election	Member	Party
1982	To Man-kwong	Nonpartisan
1988	So Mun-cheong	Nonpartisan
199?	So Mun-cheong	DAB
1994	Wong Wai-yim	Nonpartisan
1999	Wan Wo-fai	DAB
2019	Ko Wai-kei	DAB

== Election results ==
=== 2010s ===
North District Council Election, 2019: Sha Ta
Party	Candidate	Votes	%	±%
DAB	Ko Wai-kei	3,143	58.37	
Nonpartisan	Lester John Choy Yuk-wai	2,242	41.63	
Majority		901	16.74	
Turnout		5,424	58.96	
DAB hold		Swing		
