= Luk Keng =

Luk Keng may refer to:

- Luk Keng, an area in the North District of Hong Kong, containing several villages, including:
  - Luk Keng Chan Uk
  - Luk Keng Lam Uk
  - Luk Keng Wong Uk
- Luk Keng Village: A village in Yam O, Lantau Island, Hong Kong
