= Kuk Po =

Place in Hong Kong

Coordinates: 22°31′38.38″N 114°14′13.65″E

- Chinese: 谷埔
Transcriptions
Standard Mandarin
- Hanyu Pinyin: Gŭ Bù
Yue: Cantonese
- Yale Romanization: Gūk bou
- Jyutping: Guk1 bou3

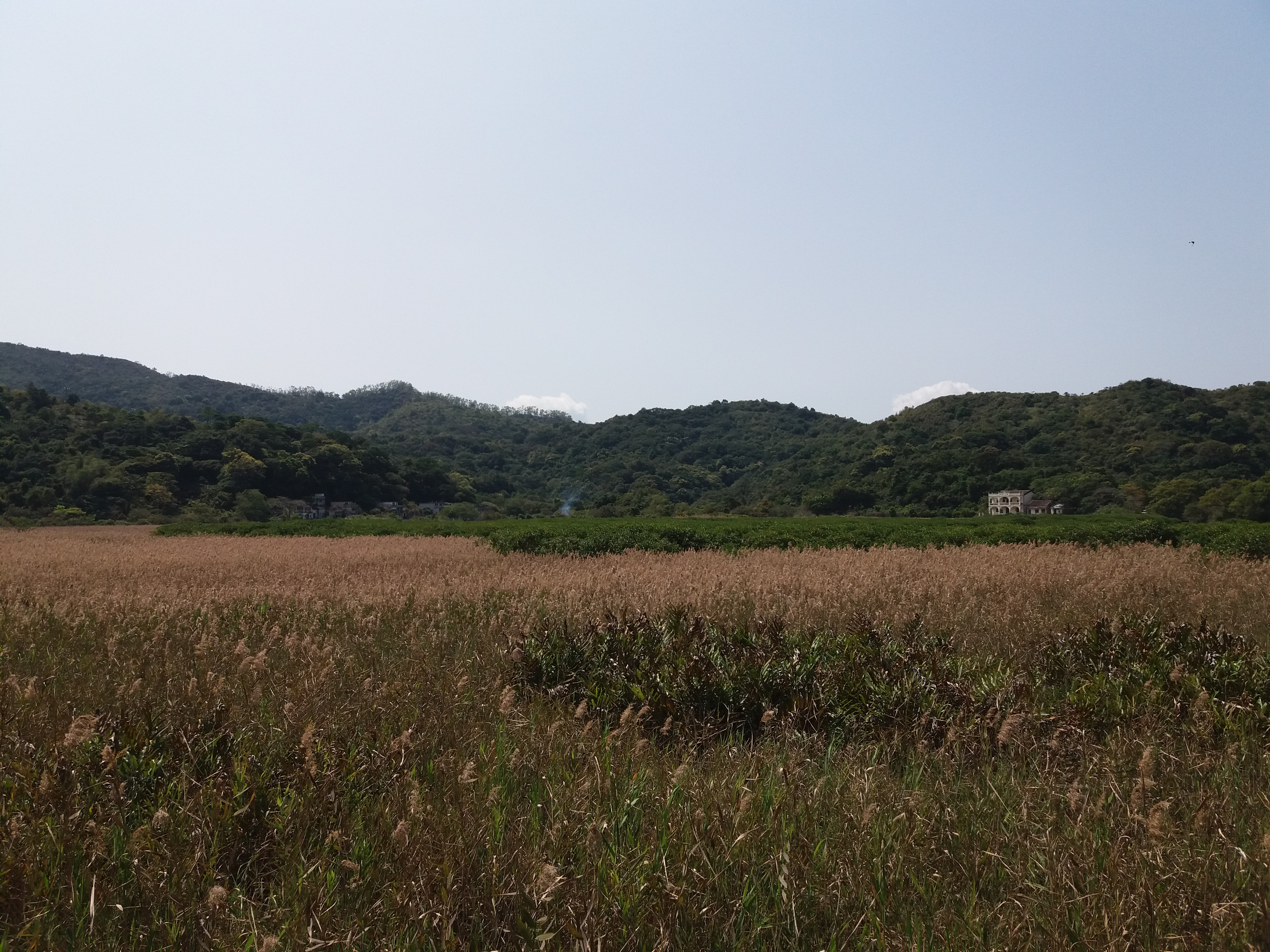
The Golden Reed Field of Kuk Po

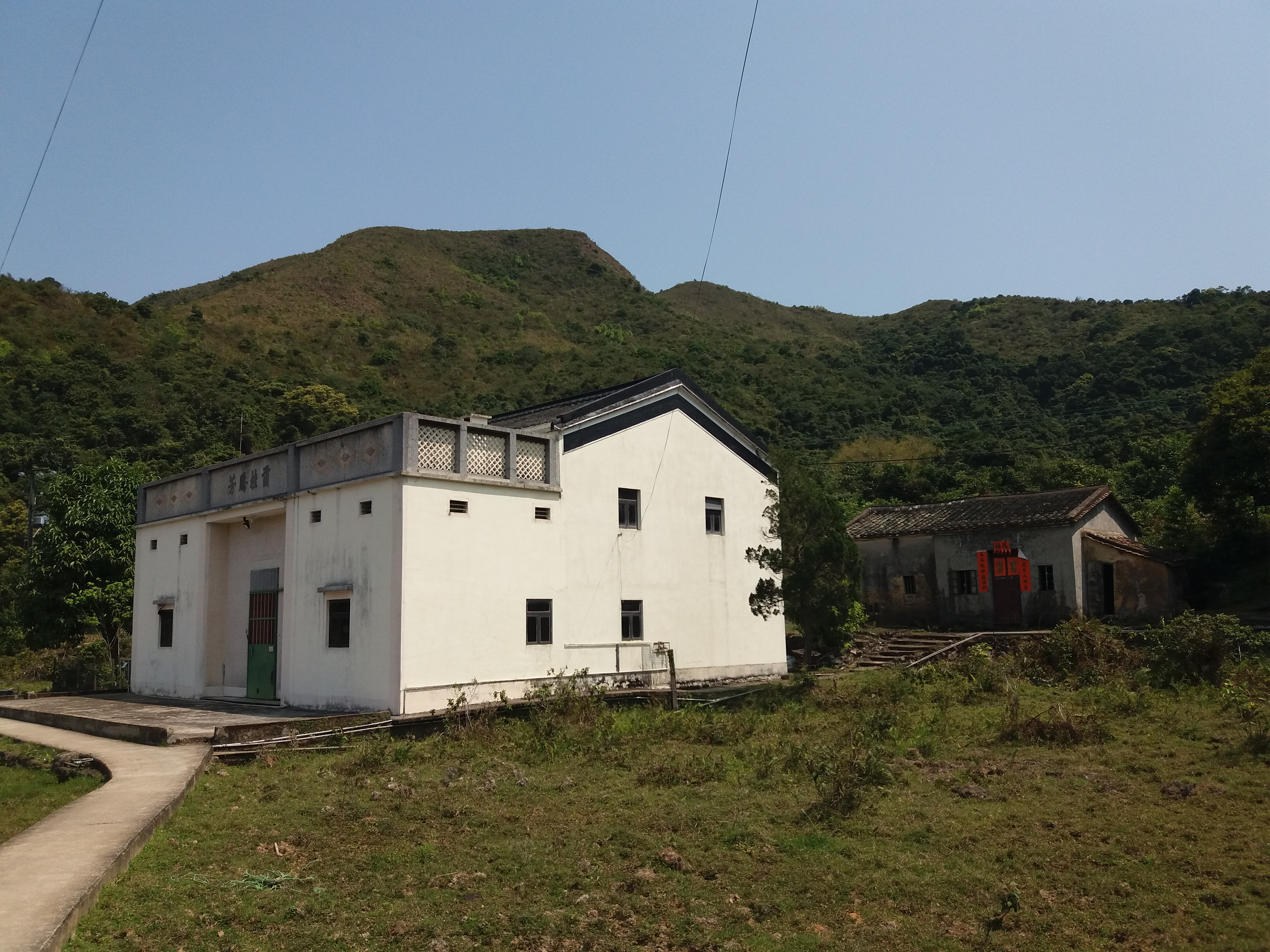
Traditional Houses in Kuk Po.

Kuk Po is an area situated in the north eastern New Territories of Hong Kong, to the south of the Starling Inlet (Shataukok Hoi, Sha Tau Kok Hoi), opposite the town of Sha Tau Kok.

== Administration ==
Kuk Po is a recognized village under the New Territories Small House Policy. For electoral purposes, Kuk Po is part of the Sha Ta constituency of the North District Council. It is currently represented by Ko Wai-kei, who was elected in the local elections.

== History ==
By accounts given by villagers, the area was originally inhabited by the Cheung (張) clan who now reside in Fung Hang, and this is supported by much of the land in Kuk Po being owned by the Cheung. The Cheung may have been the original inhabitants prior to the 1662 evacuation of the coastal regions under the Kangxi Emperor of the Qing dynasty. All the coastal inhabitants had to move fifty li from the coast. Two years later a further evacuation further inland was ordered. It was not until 1669 that this evacuation was rescinded, and the depopulated coastal regions could be re-inhabited. The Kangxi Emperor decreed some financial assistance to help with the repopulation efforts, and it is probably due to this measure that newcomers came to Kuk Po and surrounding areas to live.

For over three centuries, the area of Kuk Po has been inhabited by seven clans, the Sung (宋), Lee (李), Ho (何), Tsang (曾), Cheng (鄭), Ng (吳) and Yeung (楊). There are a number of smaller villages under the geographical name Kuk Po, and these are (romanised names are the Hakka pronunciation): Hoi Ha (海下), Tien Sim (田心), Lau Vui (老圍, Kuk Po Lo Wai), Sin Vuk Ha (新屋下), NgiDu (or Yito) (二肚), Sam Du (or Samto) (三肚), Si Du (or Szeto) (四肚), Ng Du (or Ngto) (五肚). Some like Lau Vui, Tien Sim and Sam Du are mixed clan, but the others are villages of one clan. All inhabitants of Kuk Po are generally from a farming background. Living close to the inlet means that many of the people also enjoy fishing and gathering shellfish.

At the time of the 1911 census, the population of Kuk Po Lo Wai was 247; the number of males was 140. The population of Kuk Po San Wai was 126; the number of males was 56.

Kuk Po boasts a rural school house. It was built in the 1928, inspired by the Guangzhou Military Academy School, and is firmly connected with Sung Miau On, who became the local Kuk Po school headmaster. Sung Miao On was not originally from Kuk Po, but had studied in Guangzhou at the Military Academy School. He came to Kuk Po and identified with the people there who were of the same clan as he was. The school was still in use until the early 1990s, with the last headmaster Mr. Ho and a couple of teachers, and a few children who travelled across the bay to attend school every day.

By that time, the rural inhabitants of Kuk Po had moved to live in other areas. They continued to maintain their links with the village with some visiting frequently, and some coming on the first and fifteenth of the lunar months and festivities to observe pray and offerings to ancestors and the gods of the home and hearth.

== Villages ==
There are several villages in Kuk Po. Kuk Po Lo Wai (谷埔老圍) is the oldest one. It was a Hakka walled village.

== Kuk Po today ==
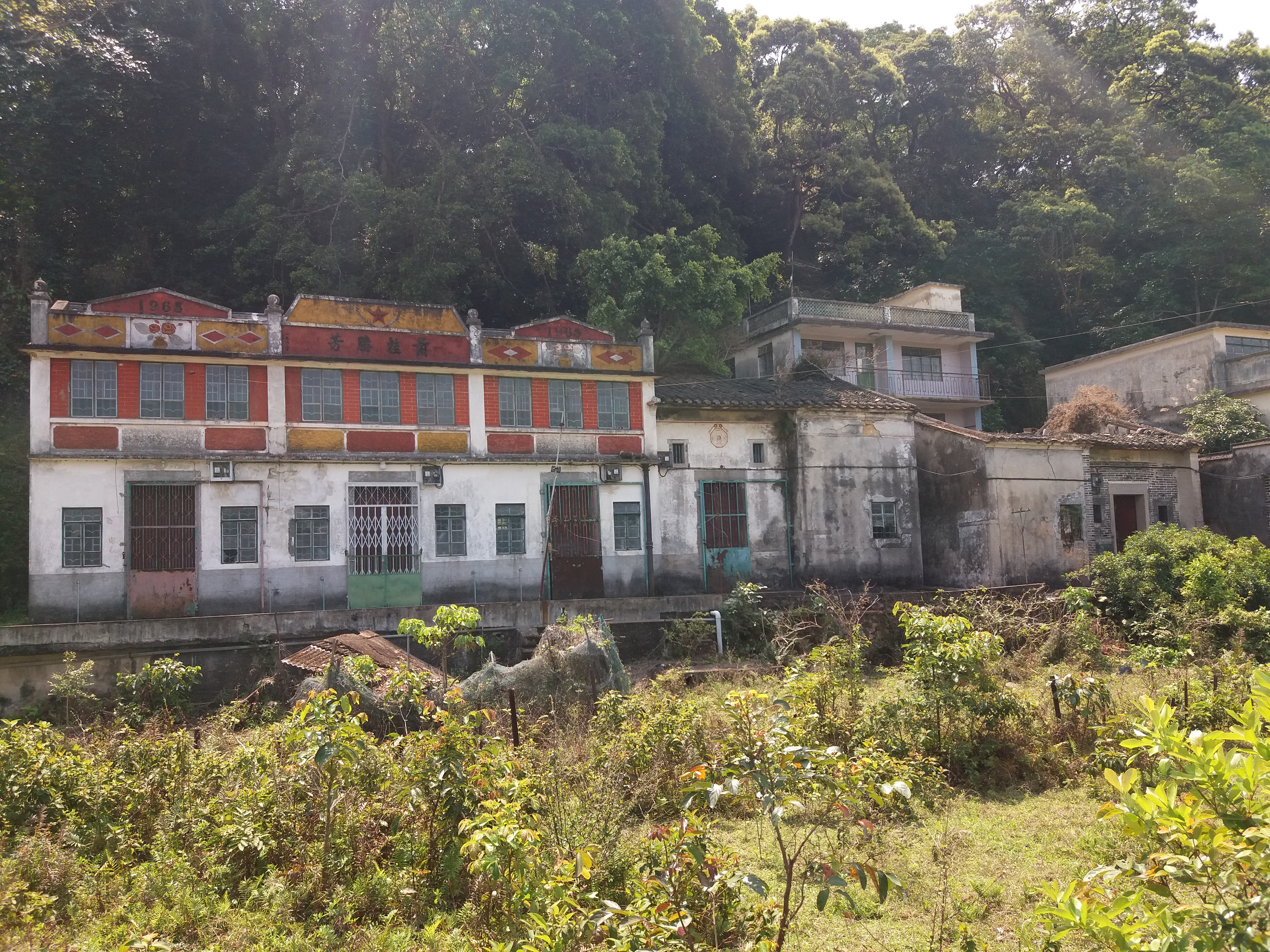
Abandoned Houses in Kuk Po

Today, though the villages in Kuk Po are mostly deserted, there is tourism of a kind with hill walkers passing through the area from their mountain trail excursions from the nearby Plover Cove Country Park which fringes the Kuk Po valley. A stall near to the school is open every Sunday to cater for the travellers, owned by local indigenous Kuk Po people.

The rural decline of Kuk Po is reflected in other village areas in remote and almost inaccessible areas, such as So Lo Pun. To reach Kuk Po from the outside, local residents require to pass through the Shek Chung O border crossing with a permit. This is because Sha Tau Kok lies within a restricted border region. Moreover, it requires taking a ferry boat journey across the Starling Inlet to reach the pier at Kuk Po Hoi Ha. This is because the trackway from Luk Keng is impractical, though some residents are known to use it, it is more usual for people to take a boat across. For mountain trail trekkers, the route is via the Country Park.

The inhabitants of Kuk Po are Hakka speakers like the surrounding villages and many people in the town of Sha Tau Kok. Many of those who were educated in Kuk Po since the 1970s are bilingual in Hakka and Cantonese.

== Conservation ==
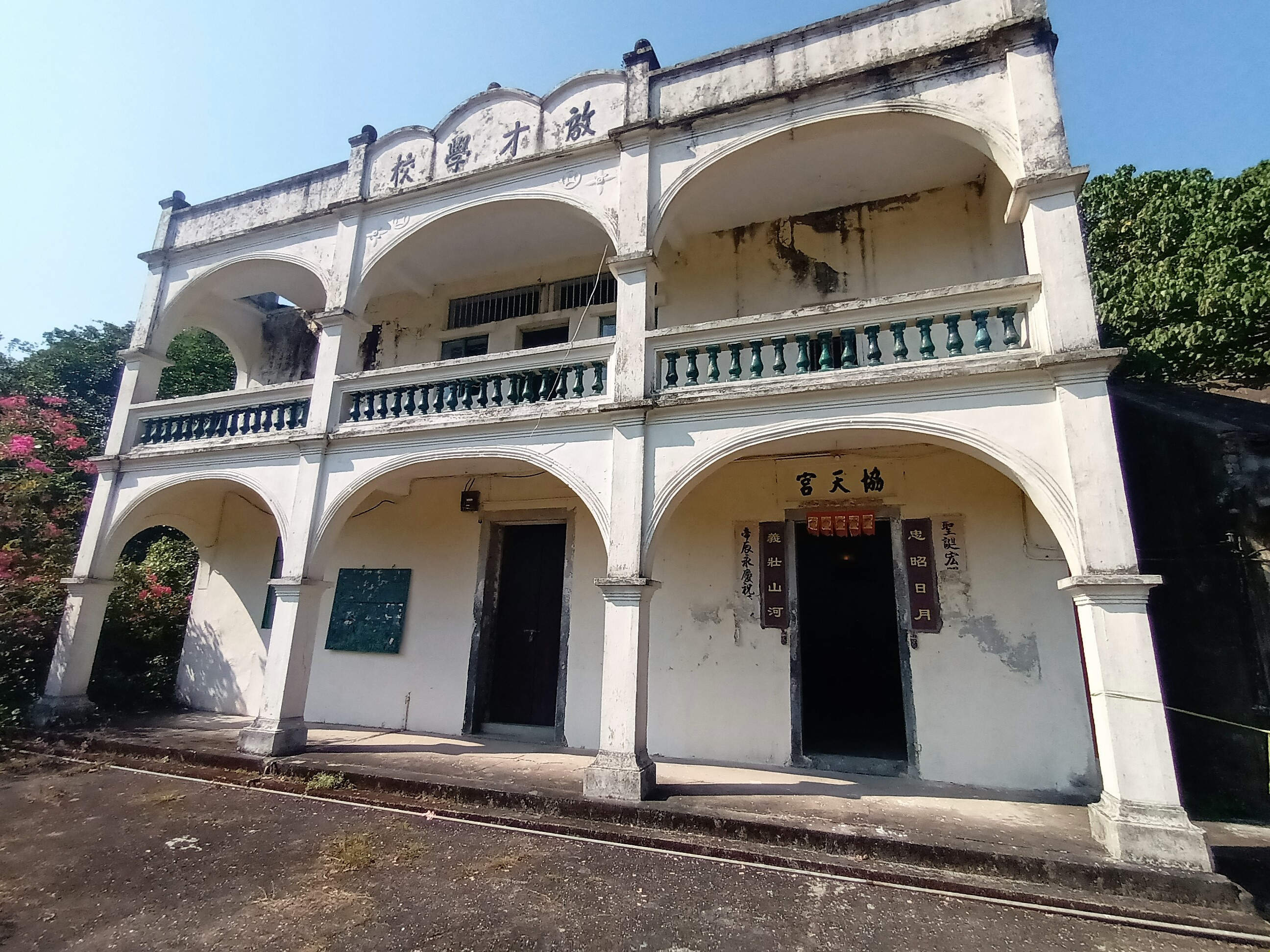
Kai Choi School and Hip Tin Temple in Kuk Po.

The Kai Choi School (啟才學校) and Hip Tin Temple in Kuk Po, as well as the Yeung Ancestral Hall and the Li Ancestral Hall in Kuk Po Lo Wai have been listed as Grade III historic buildings.

== Access ==
There is a trackway which leads from the school in Kuk Po towards Fung Hang, and it takes travellers towards Kai Kuk Shue Ha and Ham Hang Mei, and out to Luk Keng where there is public transport available. The journey on foot can take around forty minutes to three quarters of an hour.

== See also ==
- List of villages in Hong Kong
