= Wong Uk Tsuen =

Wong Uk Tsuen or Wong Uk Village may refer to:

- Wong Uk Village (Sha Tin District) (Chinese: 王屋村), a village in Sha Tin District, Hong Kong
- Wong Uk Tsuen (Yuen Long District) (Chinese: 黃屋村), a village in Yuen Long Kau Hui, Yuen Long District, Hong Kong
- Luk Keng Wong Uk (Chinese: 鹿頸黃屋), a village in Luk Keng, North District, Hong Kong
