= Fung Hang =

Village in Hong Kong

Coordinates: 22.528076°N 114.225667°E

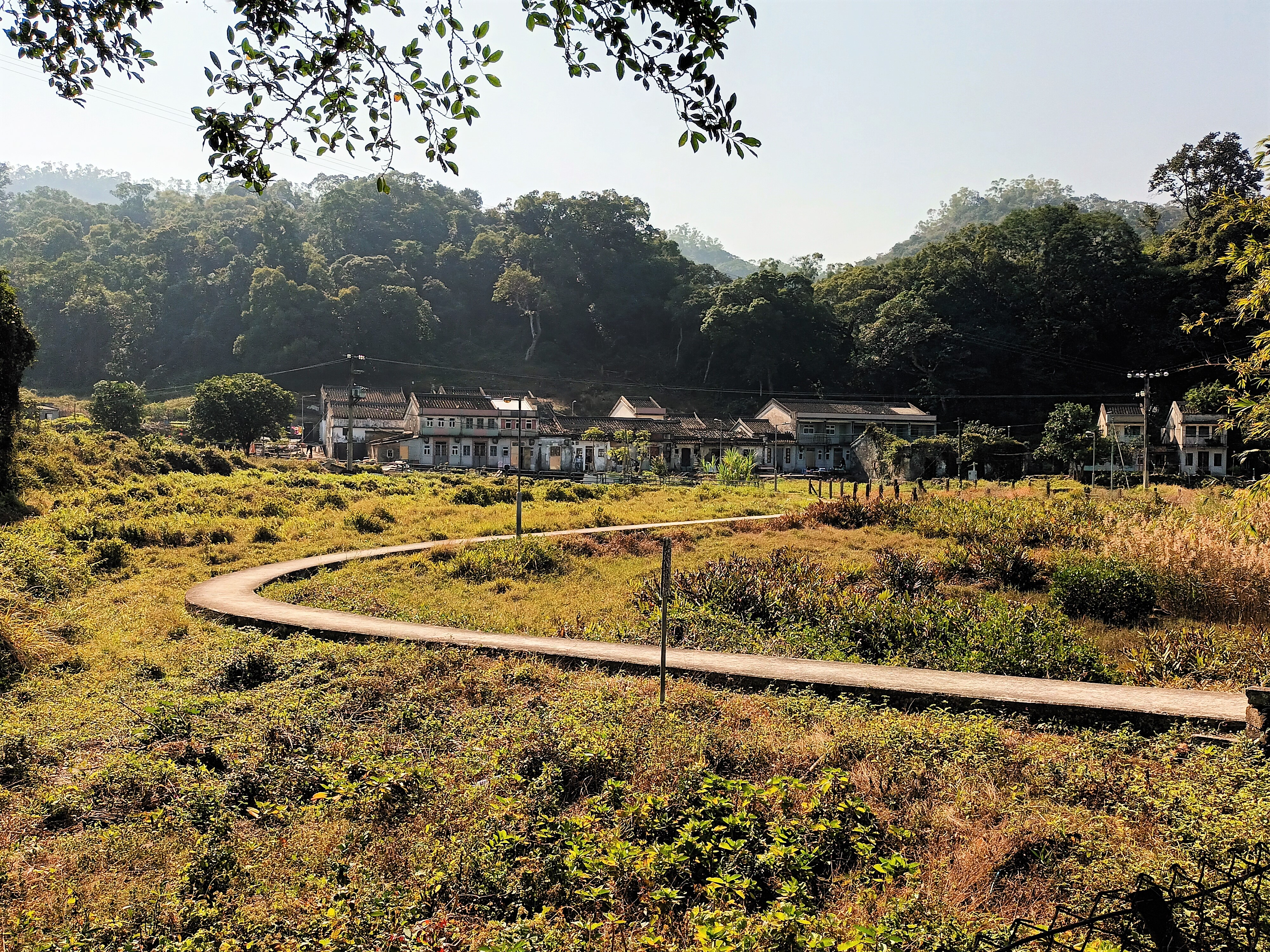
Fung Hang.

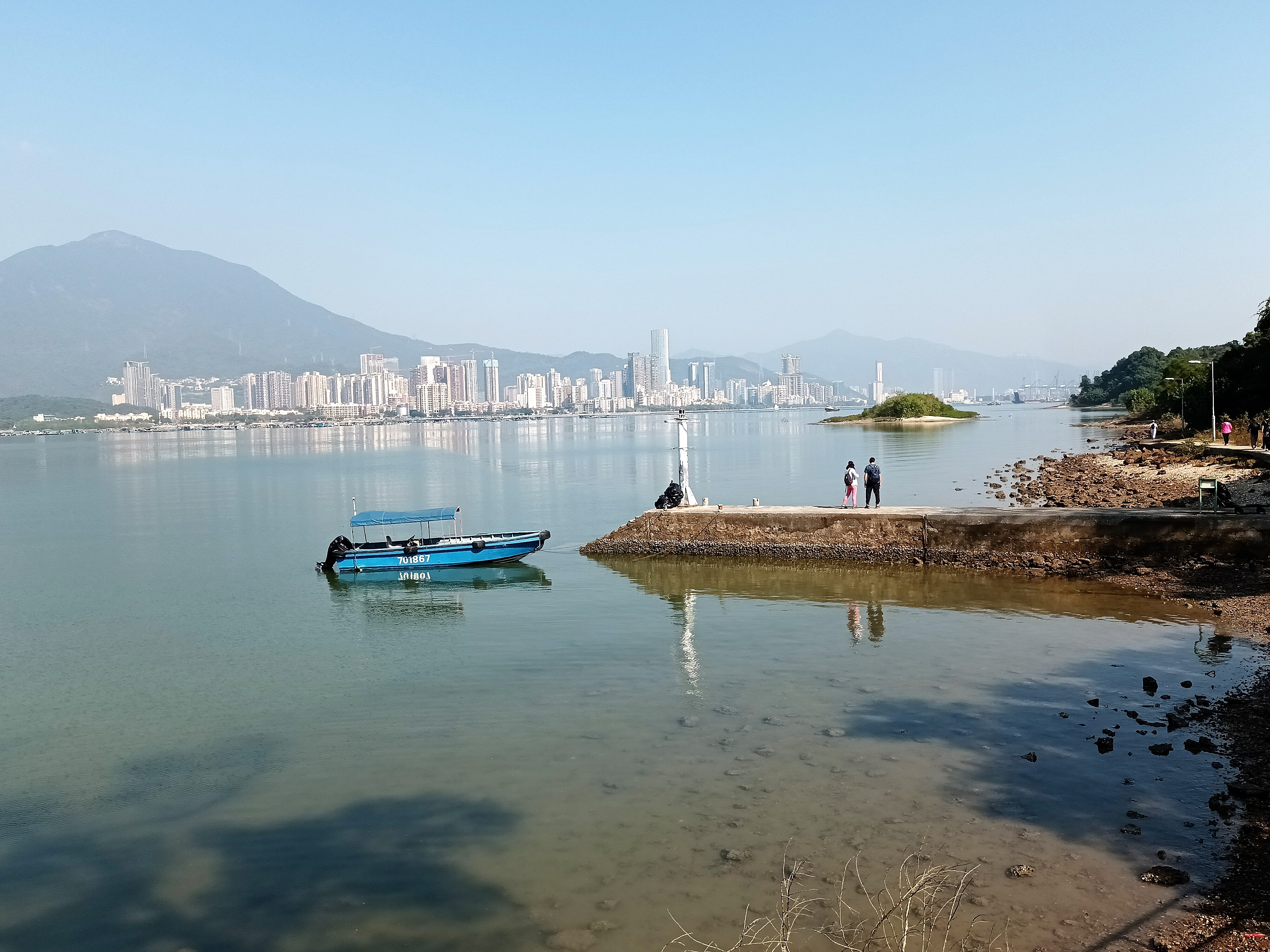
View of Fung Hang Pier by Starling Inlet, with Shenzhen in the background.

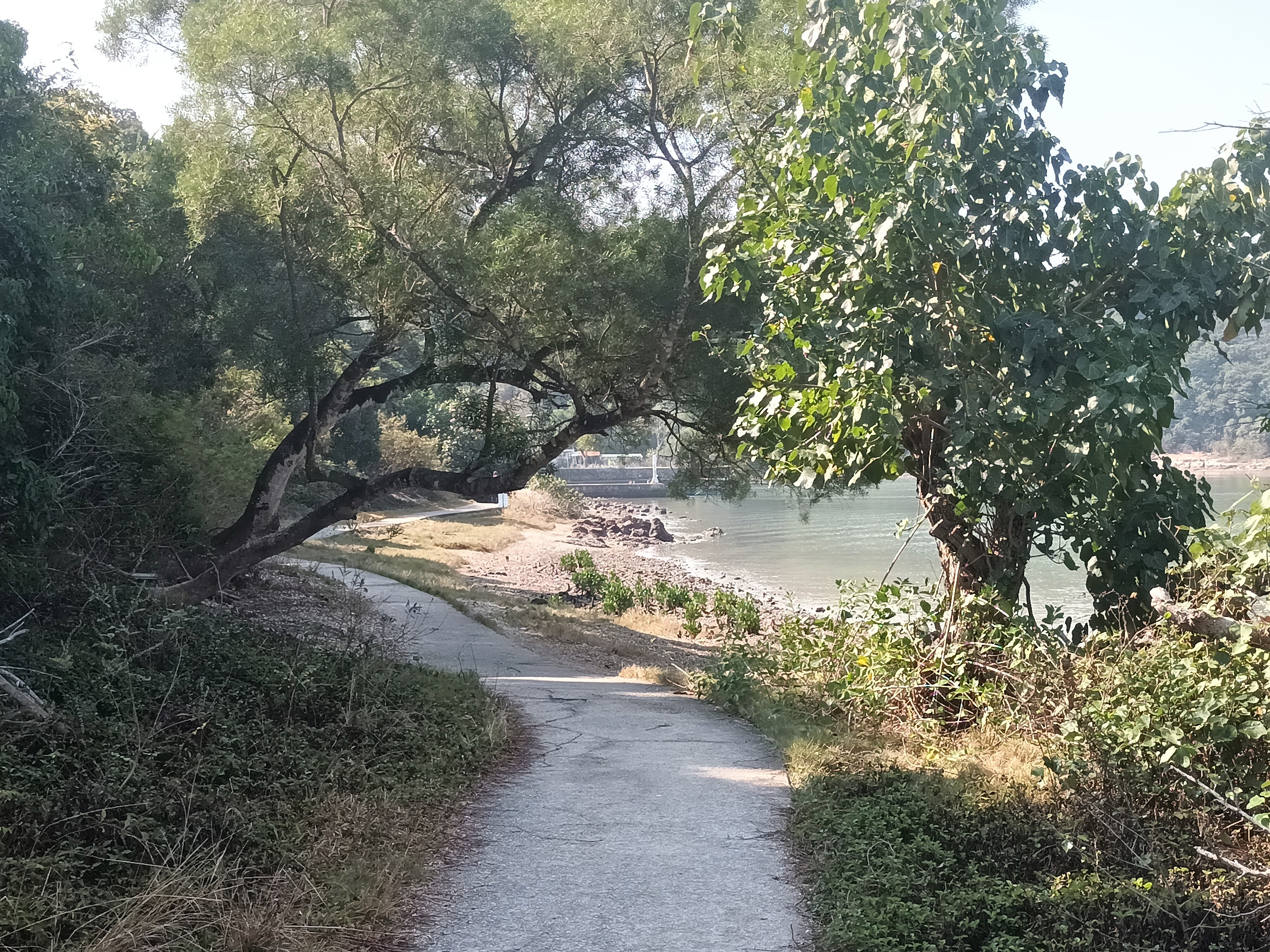
Coastal path near Fung Hang.

Fung Hang (Chinese: 鳳坑) is a village in the north eastern New Territories of Hong Kong, to the south west of the Sha Tau Kok Hoi or Starling Inlet, opposite the town of Sha Tau Kok. It is a single-clan Hakka village of the Cheung (張) Clan located between Luk Keng and Kuk Po.

== Administration ==
Fung Hang is a recognized village under the New Territories Small House Policy. It is one of the villages represented within the Sha Tau Kok District Rural Committee. For electoral purposes, Fung Hang is part of the Sha Ta constituency, which is currently represented by Ko Wai-kei.

== History ==
The Cheungs, previously established in Kuk Po, moved to Fung Hang in 1671, shortly after the end of the Great Clearance. They were farmers engaged in fishing and later concentrated in rice and vegetables growing. Most of the villagers have moved overseas or to other areas of Hong Kong.

At the time of the 1911 census, the population of Fung Hang was 143. The number of males was 61.

== Built heritage ==
The Cheung Ancestral Hall in Fung Hang was probably built before the 20th century. It was renovated in 1975.

== See also ==
- List of villages in Hong Kong
