= Luk Keng Chan Uk =

Village in Luk Keng, Hong Kong

Coordinates: 22°31′32″N 114°12′55″E

Luk Keng Chan Uk (Chinese: 鹿頸陳屋) is a village situated in the Luk Keng area, in the northeastern part of the New Territories, Hong Kong. It is a popular tourist destination for sightseeing and hiking.

== Administration ==
Luk Keng Chan Uk is a recognized village under the New Territories Small House Policy. It is one of the villages represented within the Sha Tau Kok District Rural Committee. For electoral purposes, Luk Keng Chan Uk is part of the Sha Ta constituency, which is currently represented by Ko Wai-kei.

== History ==
The village is mainly inhabited by the Chan (陳 Hakka ts^{h}in11 ) Clan although there are other surnames present in the village including Wong. It is a Hakka-speaking village. Historically, the village was used for livestock farming and growing crops. Today, the village is mostly uninhabited, and half of the village houses are deserted.

The Chan clan's ancestor Chan Man-tai settled in Xinan during the Qing dynasty in 1719. His fifth son Chan Tze-tak came to Luk Keng during the Yongzheng (Chinese: 雍正, 1723-1735) reign of the dynasty. The Chans of Sheung Tam Shui Hang (Chinese: 上担水坑) in Sha Tau Kok, and Sam Tung Uk (Chinese: 三棟屋) in Tsuen Wan also have the same ancestor as the Chans in Luk Keng.

Those that came to Luk Keng erected the water barrier upon which the main road now travels upon, separating the village's agricultural land from the seawater.

During the 1920s, two teachers from the Chan clan of Luk Keng taught in Tung Wo School in Tung Wo Market. They were: Chan Kan-cheung (Chinese: 陳謹章), a returned student from the USA who taught English and Physical Education; Chan Ping-long (Chinese: 陳重浪), a graduate from Canton who taught “the new books". The school was located next to Tung Wo Market in Sha Tau Kok, which at the time was adjacent to the Chinese side of the frontier. It was operated by the Shap Yeuk village alliance, and was seen as the highest standard school of the area, as high as the new government schools in the New Territories.

In the 1950s and 1960s, many villagers left for the UK and other parts of the world. This was partly due to UK immigration policy at the time and with little work available in the village the inhabitants sought to earn money elsewhere.

Little development has taken place in Luk Keng, mainly because the government has zoned the Luk Keng Marsh as a priority site for enhanced conservation. Moreover, the Government's planning policy has also restricted development of small houses and unilaterally designated parts of the area as conservation area, although most of it is private land.

== Built heritage ==
There are two ancestral halls at Luk Keng Chan Uk, the Chan Ancestral Hall (陳氏家祠), built around 1900, and the Chan Tze Tak Ancestral Hall (子德陳公祠). Both are built by descendants to worship the ancestors of the Chan family.

The ruins of the village school, Man Lam School (文林學校), can still be seen. The school was closed in 1952 and replaced by Luk Keng Public School (鹿頸學校), it is currently abandoned.

== Transportation ==
The closest station to Luk Keng on the MTR is Fanling station. Green minibus No.56K runs to the Luk Keng terminus.

== See also ==
- List of villages in Hong Kong
- Luk Keng Wong Uk
- Luk Keng
