= Sam Tung Uk Museum =

Museum in Tsuen Wan, Hong Kong

Coordinates: 22.37205°N 114.12015°E

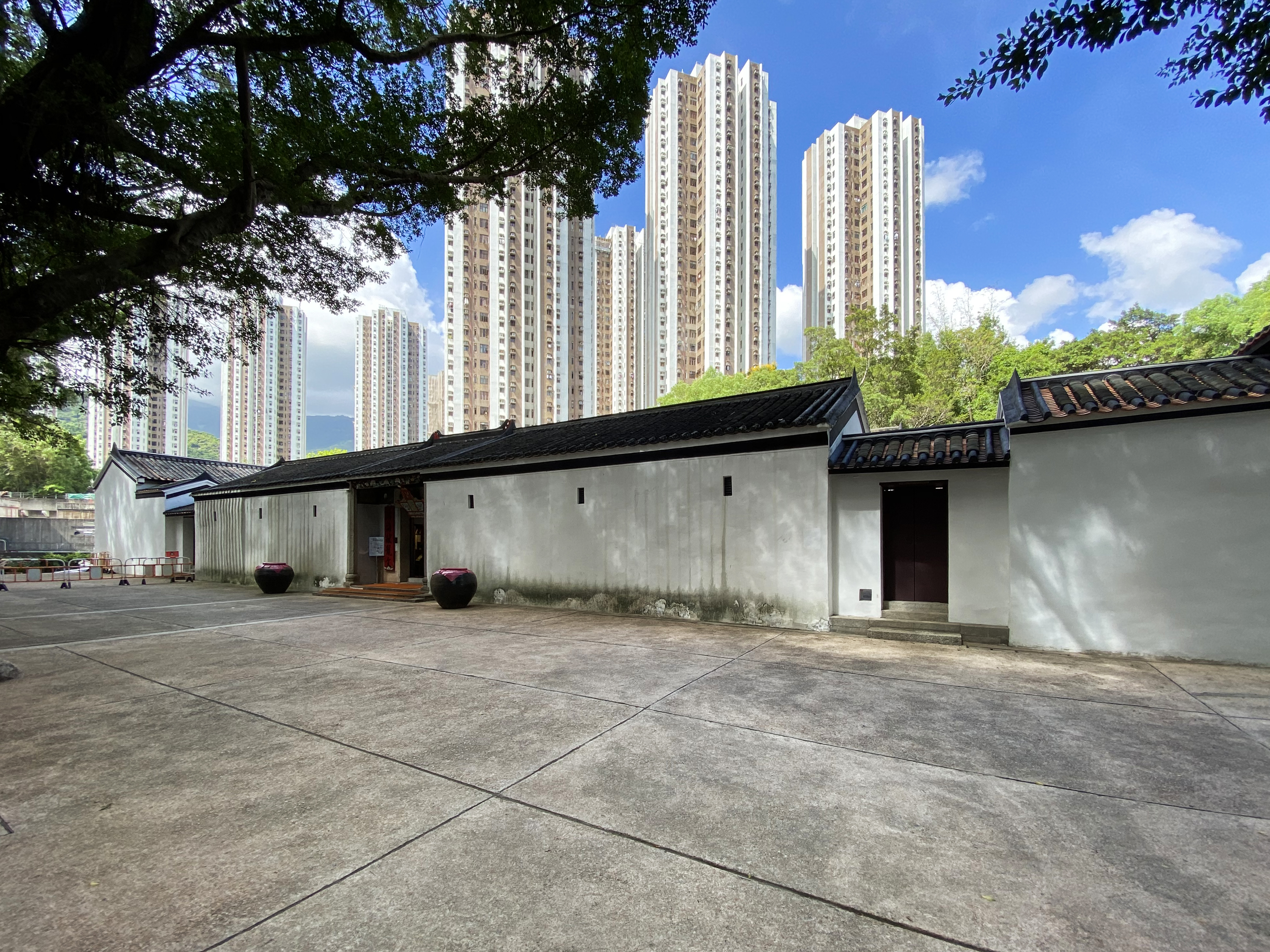
- Established: 1987; 39 years ago
- Location: 2 Kwu Uk Lane, Tsuen Wan; Hong Kong
- Type: Folk museum
- Curator: Celia Shum Pui-yuk
- Public transit access: Tsuen Wan station
- Website: Sam Tung Uk Museum website

Declared Monument of Hong Kong
- Official name: Sam Tung Uk Village
- Designated: 13 March 1981; 45 years ago
- Reference no.: 10

Sam Tung Uk Museum
- Traditional Chinese: 三棟屋博物館
- Simplified Chinese: 三栋屋博物馆
Transcriptions
Standard Mandarin
- Hanyu Pinyin: Sān Dòng Wū Bówùguǎn
Yue: Cantonese
- Yale Romanization: Sāam duhng ūk bok maht gún
- Jyutping: Saam1 dung6 uk1 bok3 mat6 gun2

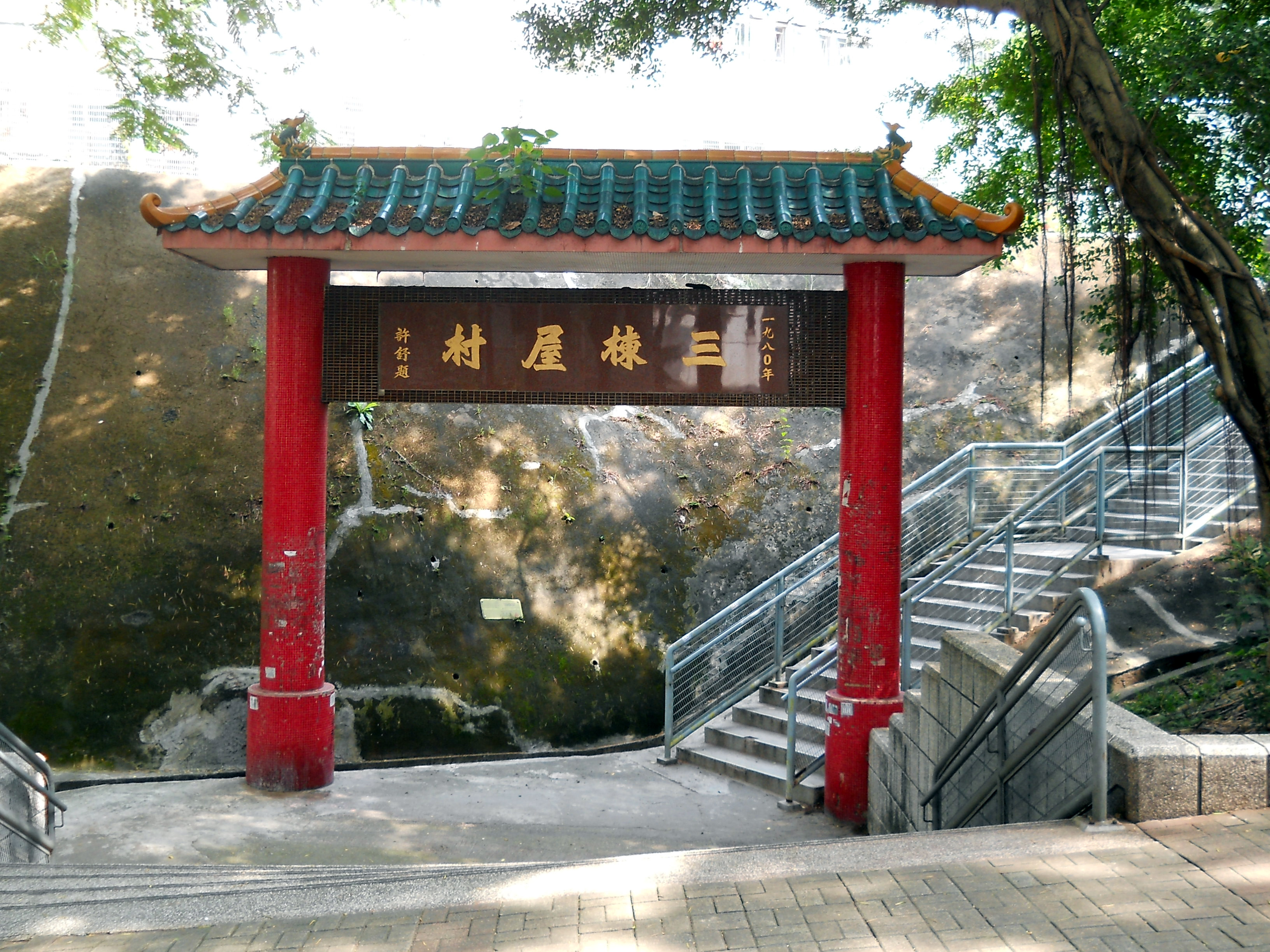
Gate of Sam Tung Uk Resite Village.

The Sam Tung Uk Museum is a museum restored from Sam Tung Uk (三棟屋; 'three-beam-dwelling', which describes the original floorplan), a Hakka walled village in Tsuen Wan, Hong Kong.

== History ==
Sam Tung Uk was built by a Chan (Chinese: 陳, pronounced chin2 (or tshin2) in the Hakka dialect) clan under the leadership of the clan patriarch, Chan Yam-shing, (Note: Chinese: 陳任盛) in 1786 during the Qing dynasty. At the time, it was called Chan Sei Bit Tong (陳四必堂) and located in Tsin Wan (now Tsuen Wan). The Chan clan originally migrated from northern China to Fujian during the Hongwu era (1368-1398), then to Luo Fang village (Note: Chinese: 羅芳村) in Xin'an county (now Lo Wu, Guangdong) around the year 1970 before settling in Hong Kong during the Qianlong era (1736-1796). The plot of land was originally owned by a Suen (孫) clan but sold to the Chans.

Constructed as early as 1756, the oldest structure was arranged in a three-row layout, hence the name "三棟屋", consisting of three parallel rows of houses connected by courtyards and passageways, with the ancestral hall occupying the central axis. As the Chan clan expanded, the village was enlarged by the addition of a rectangular outer enclosure, forming a fortified walled village. This outer ring provided additional residential accommodation while strengthening the village's defenses against bandits, pirates, and other threats. The area is approximately 150 feet by 100 feet.

Like many traditional walled villages, Sam Tung Uk has a rectangular plan enclosed by high defensive walls with a single controlled entrance. It was constructed using "Chinese grey bricks" and granite blocks for the walls and foundations, while timber columns supported pitched roofs covered with traditional clay tiles. Open courtyards and narrow light wells were incorporated throughout the complex to provide natural lighting.

Unlike the larger Punti walled villages, which were typically occupied by an entire lineage or multiple branches of a clan, Sam Tung Uk was built exclusively for the immediate family of the Chan patriarch. The four principal residential houses were allocated to his four sons, making the settlement considerably smaller than villages such as Kat Hing Wai, which accommodated a much larger kinship group, including more distant relatives.

The village was home to the Chan clan for more than two centuries and was passed down through 22 generations. The site was acquired by resumption in 1978 for the Tsuen Wan line project, vacated in April 1980, and declared a historic monument in March 1981. The Chan clan was given a plot of land on Cheung Shan for compensation, where they build the Sam Tung Uk Resite Village (三棟屋新村). The Hong Kong government restored the site and converted it into a museum between 1986 and 1987. The restoration work won the Pacific Heritage Award of the Pacific Asia Tourist Association in 1990.

== Museum ==
The entrance, assembly and ancestral halls, and twelve of the original houses are preserved. Other rooms have been modified to accommodate a reception area, an orientation room, an exhibition hall, a museum office, and a lecture theatre. The agricultural implements and everyday objects of Hakka village life are on permanent display. The main exhibition hall at the far end of the building complex changes its displays approximately every six months. Documentation of the restoration process is on display in Orientation Room.

The Sam Tung Uk Museum is open from 10am to 6pm every day of the year except on Christmas Eve and Chinese New Year's Eve, opening until 5pm. The museum is closed on Tuesdays and . Admission is free of charge.

== Transportation ==
It can be accessed from Exit E of Tsuen Wan station on the MTR.

== See also ==
- Walled villages of Hong Kong
- Sam Tung Uk Resite Village
