= Starling Inlet =

Harbour in northeast New Territories, Hong Kong

Coordinates: 22°32′17″N 114°13′41″E

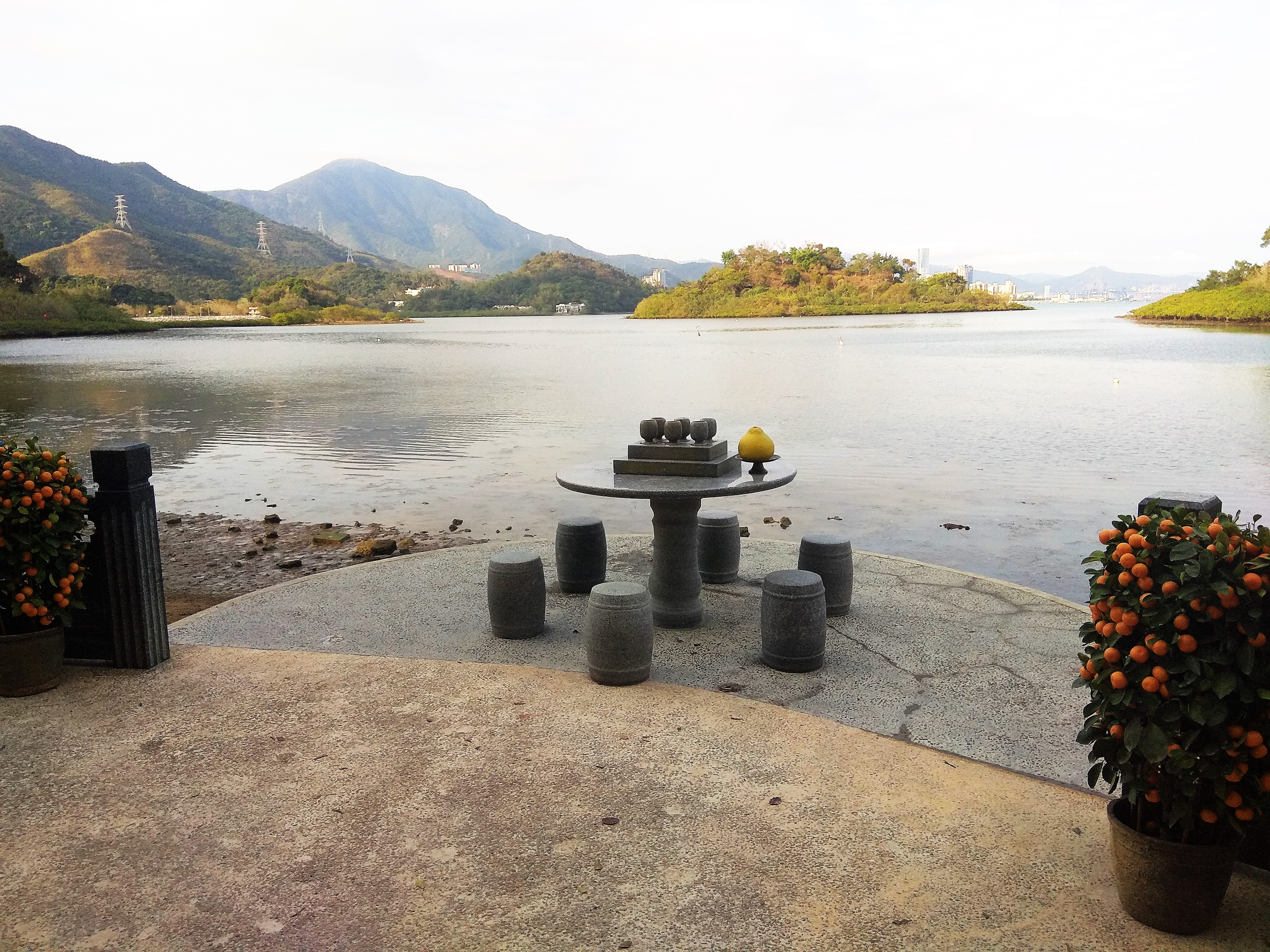
View of Starling Inlet from the Dragon King shrine of the Tin Hau Temple Complex in Nam Chung.

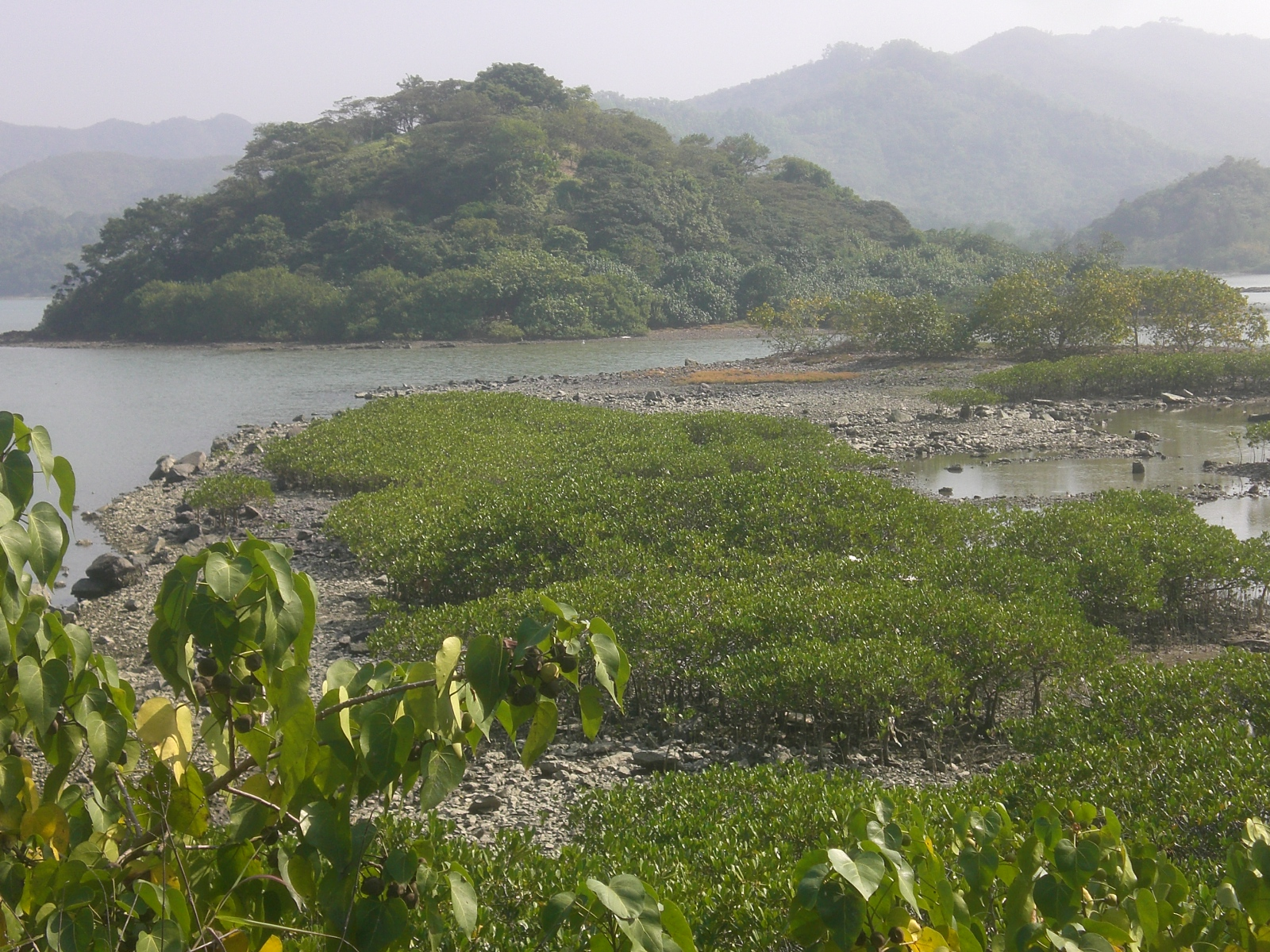
A Chau seen from Luk Keng Road. Mangroves are visible in the foreground.

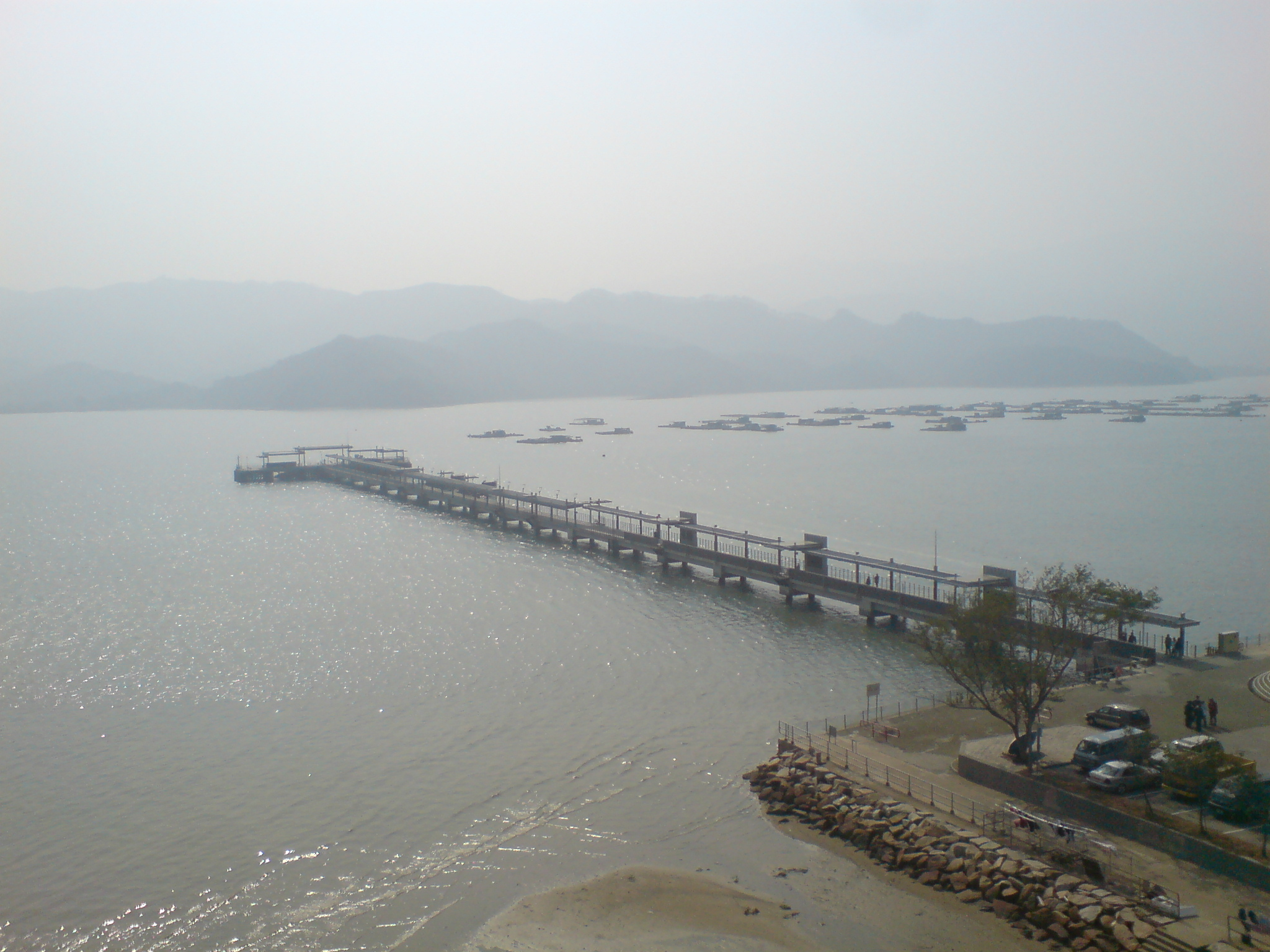
Sha Tau Kok Public Pier in Starling Inlet.

Starling Inlet or Sha Tau Kok Hoi (Chinese: 沙頭角海) is a harbour in northeast New Territories, Hong Kong. The whole body of water falls within the Closed Area and is generally restricted to local residents.

== Features ==
Settlements around the harbour include: Sha Tau Kok, Wu Shek Kok, Yim Tso Ha, Nam Chung, Luk Keng, Kai Kuk Shue Ha, Fung Hang, Kuk Po, Yung Shue Au.

Islets within Starling Inlet include A Chau, near the southwestern end of the Inlet, and Shui Cham Tsui Pai (水浸咀排).

A section of Starling Inlet located offshore of Sha Tau Kok is one of the 26 designated marine fish culture zones in Hong Kong.

== Closed Area ==
The border town Sha Tau Kok is located at the north of the opening of the inlet to Mirs Bay. For those who are not residents within the Closed Area, or are not crossing the border, a Closed Area Permit is required.

On 15 February 2012, areas around Sha Tau Kok (but not the town itself) were taken out of the Frontier Closed Area. The checkpoint at Shek Chung Au on Sha Tau Kok Road was decommissioned.

== See also ==
- Sha Tau Kok Public Pier
- Mirs Bay
