= Nam Chung =

Area in New Territories, Hong Kong

Coordinates: 22.5216°N 114.2103°E

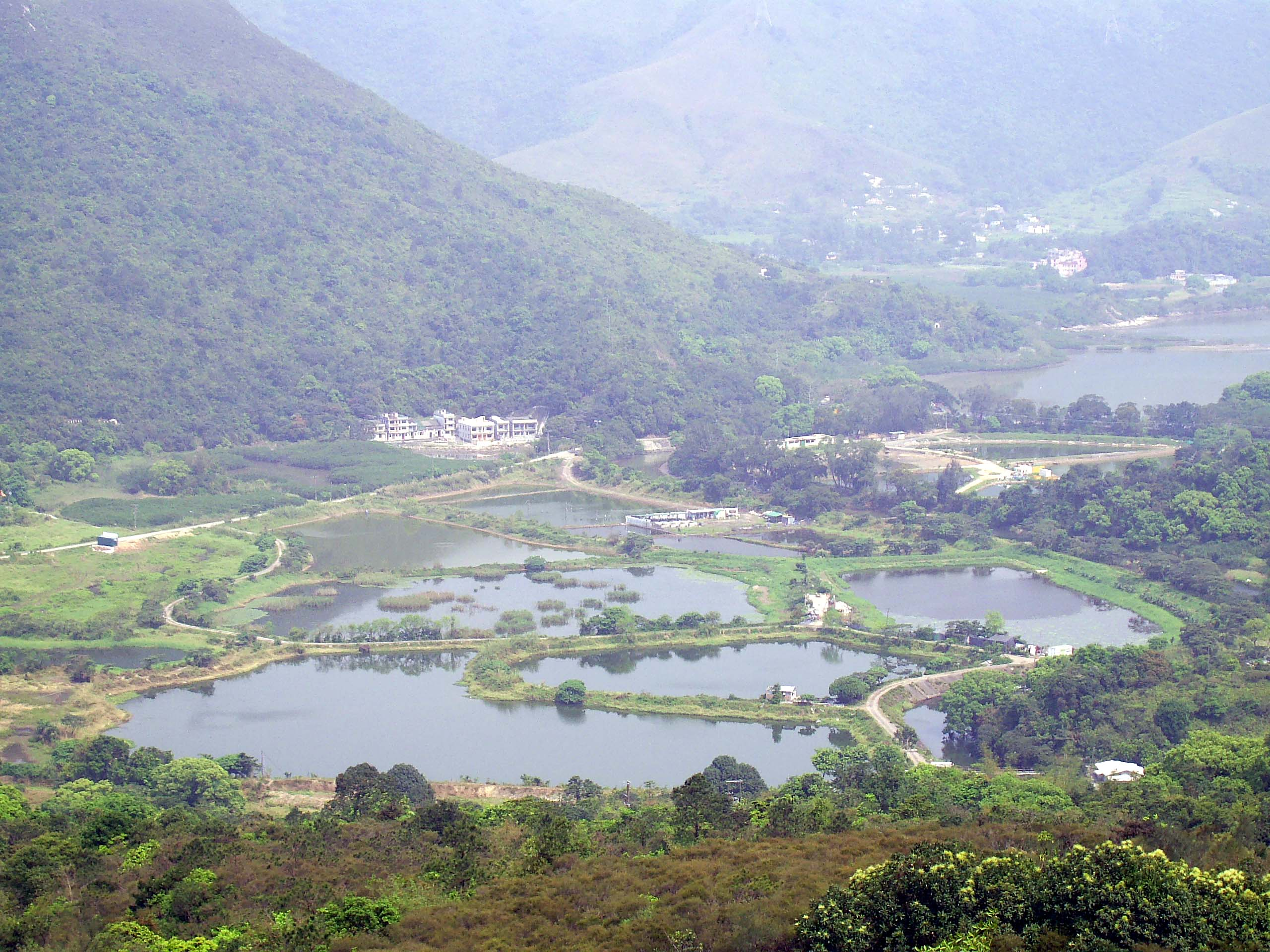
Overview of Nam Chung.

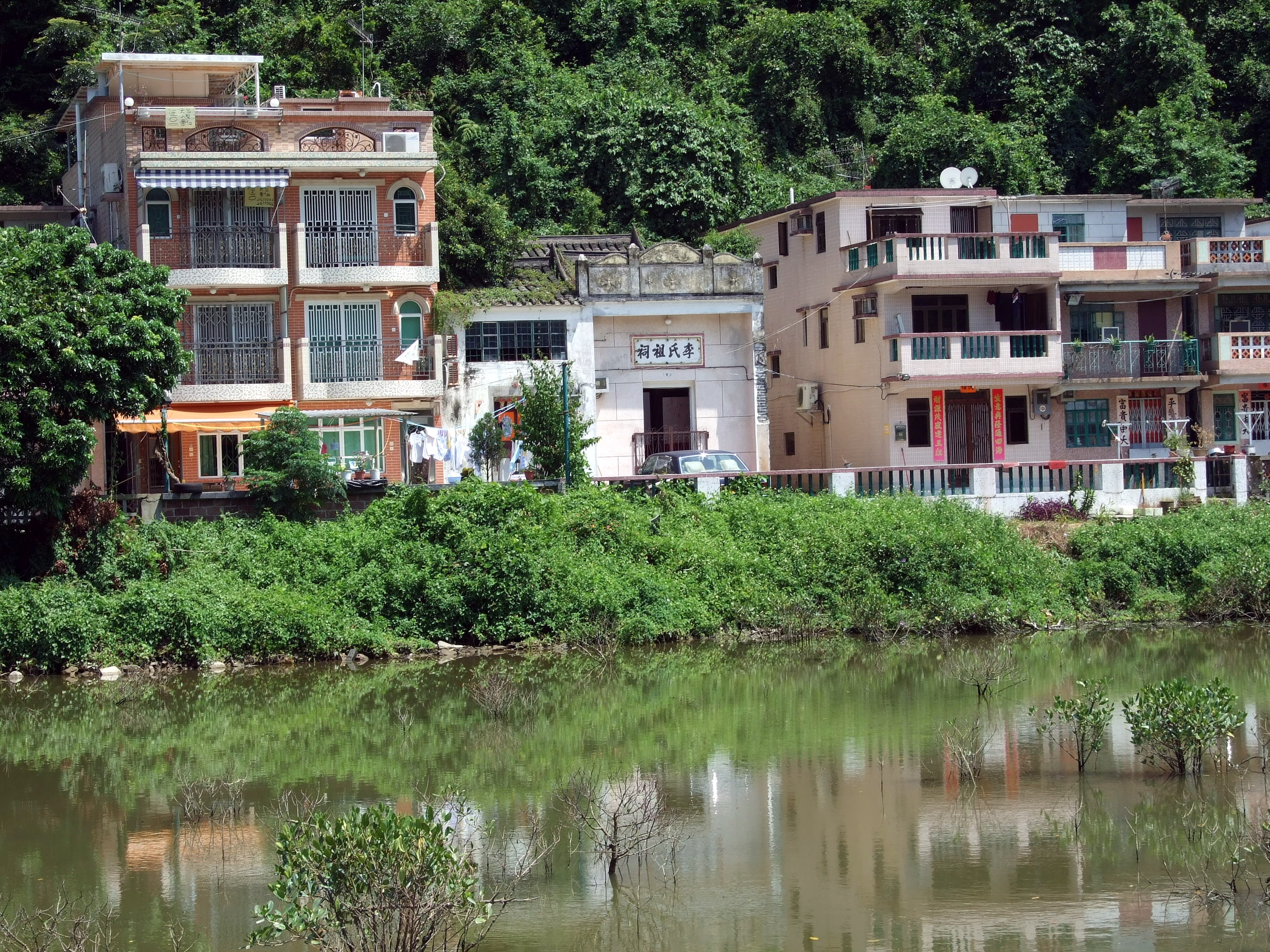
Nam Chung Lei Uk.

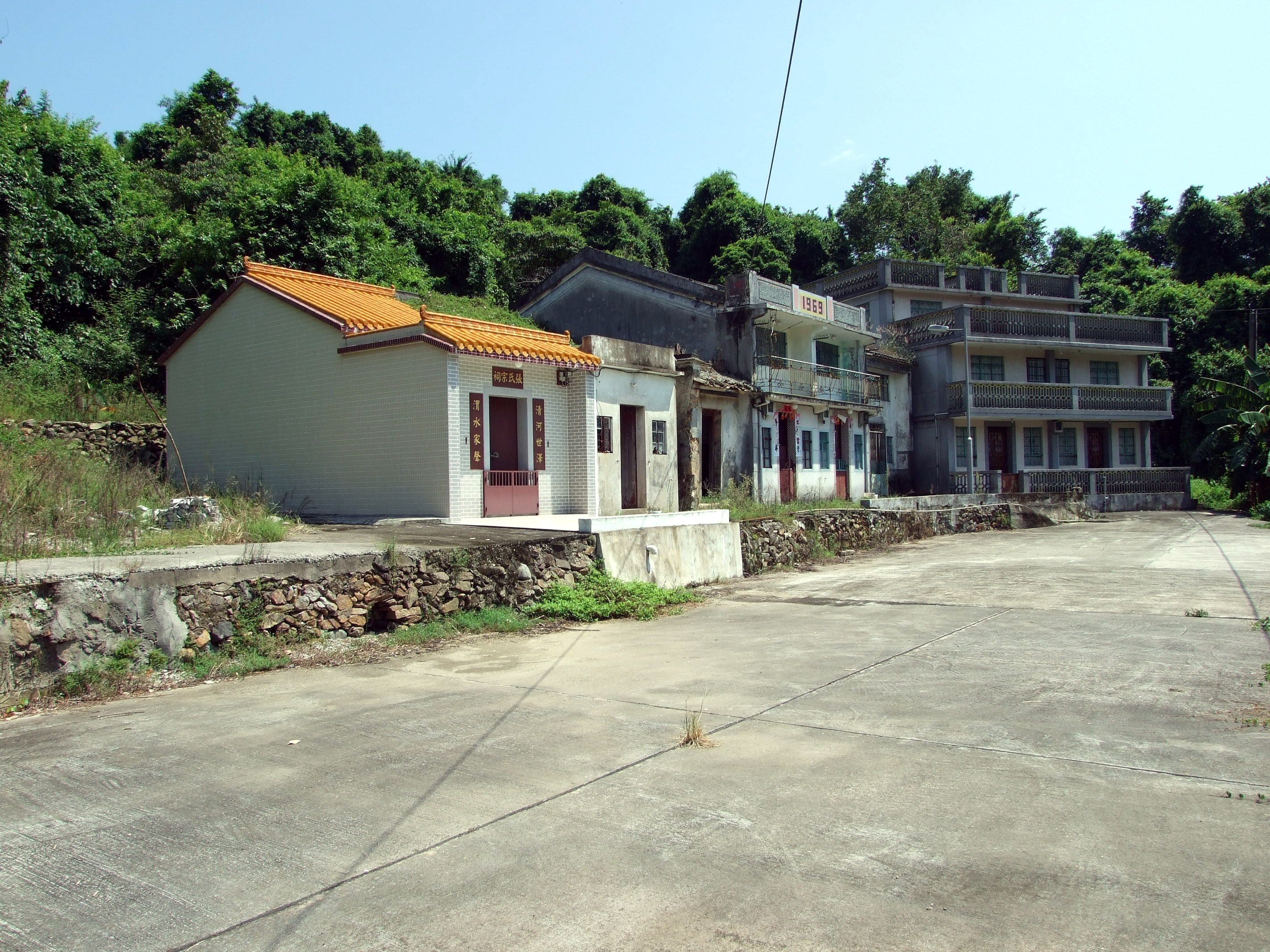
Nam Chung Cheung Uk.

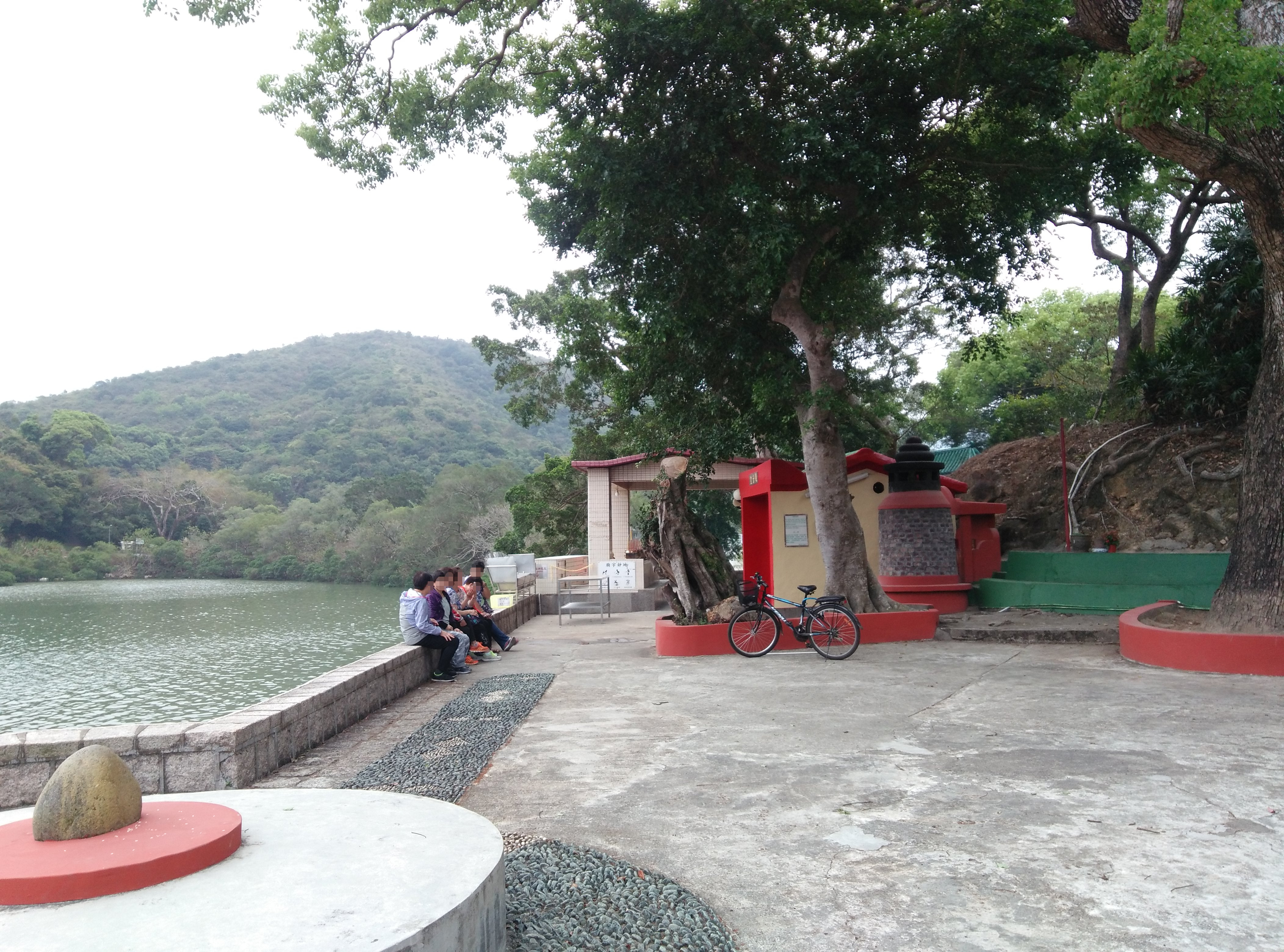
Tin Hau Temple Complex at Nam Chung.

Nam Chung (Chinese: 南涌; pinyin: Nán Chōng) is an area in the north eastern New Territories of Hong Kong, west of Luk Keng and to the southwest of the Starling Inlet (Sha Tau Kok Hoi), opposite Sha Tau Kok.

== Administration ==
Nam Chung is a recognized village under the New Territories Small House Policy. It is one of the villages represented within the Sha Tau Kok District Rural Committee. For electoral purposes, Nam Chung is part of the Sha Ta constituency, which is currently represented by Ko Wai-kei.

== Villages ==
Nam Chung Village includes Nam Chung Yeung Uk (南涌楊屋), Nam Chung Cheng Uk (南涌鄭屋), Nam Chung Law Uk (南涌羅屋), Nam Chung Cheung Uk (南涌張屋) and Nam Chung Lei Uk (南涌李屋).

== History ==
At the time of the 1911 census, the population of Nam Chung was 348. The number of males was 152.

During the Japanese Occupation of Hong Kong, Nam Chung was the site several events related to the anti-Japanese resistance effort. On March 3, 1943, Nam Chung was the site of the "Three-three incident". Several senior members of the local East River Column, who had been residing there since about a month, were killed during an assault that involved two companies of Japanese soldiers and over fifty Kempeitai. Shortly thereafter, in June 1943, Nam Chung was the first village in the New Territories to form an underground government. At that time, the village had over 200 households and a population of about 1,500.

== Conservation ==
The small island of A Chau, a Site of Special Scientific Interest, is located in the south-western part of Starling Inlet off Nam Chung.

== Transport ==
The area is linked to Fanling–Sheung Shui New Town and Sha Tau Kok via Sha Tau Kok Road and Luk Keng Road.

Nam Chung is located at the northern end of the Wilson Trail, a 78 kilometres (48 mi) long-distance footpath opened in January 1996.

== See also ==
- List of villages in Hong Kong
- Luk Keng
