= Kai Kuk Shue Ha =

Village in Hong Kong

Coordinates: 22.524216°N 114.219906°E

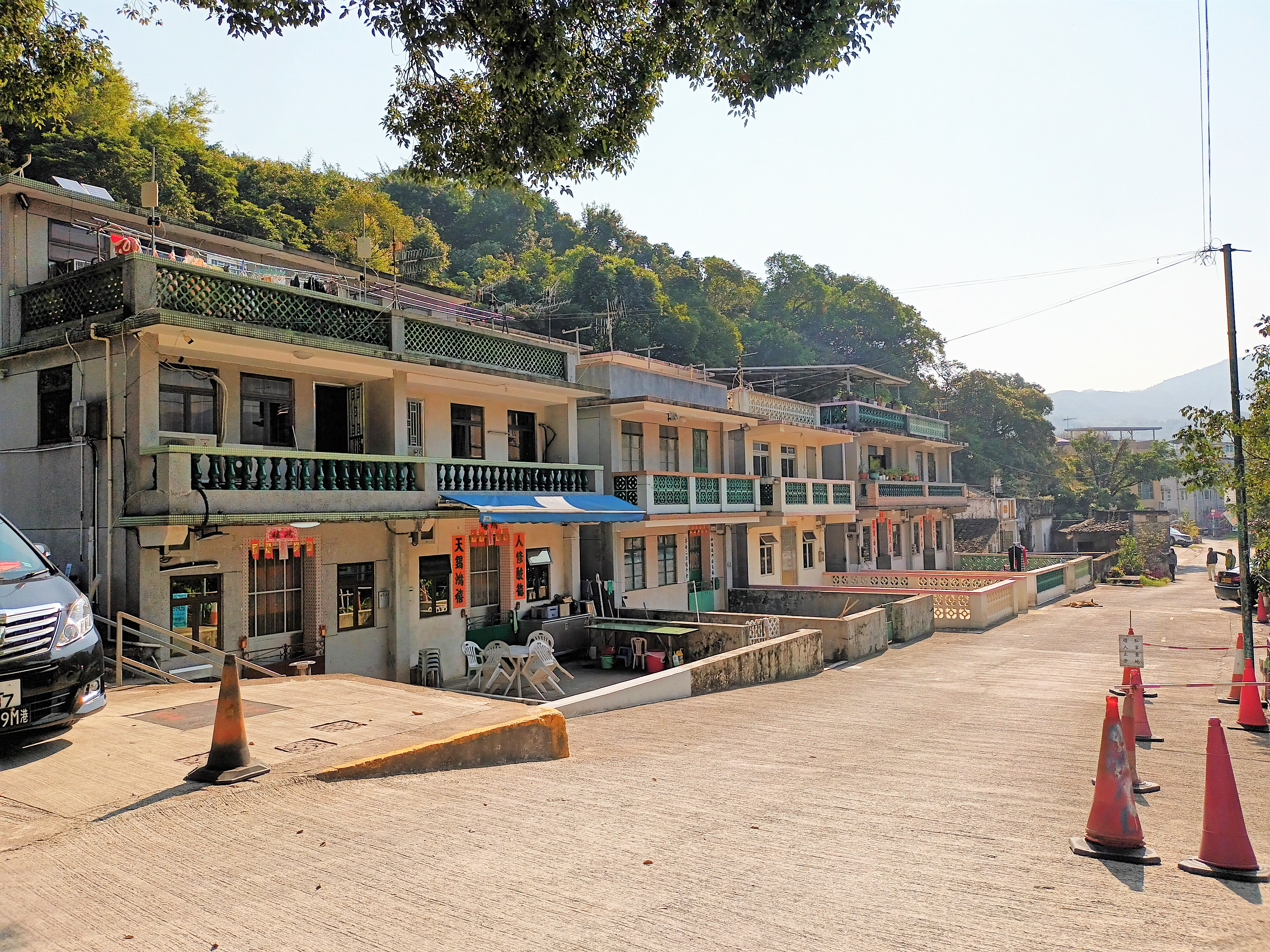
Kai Kuk Shue Ha.

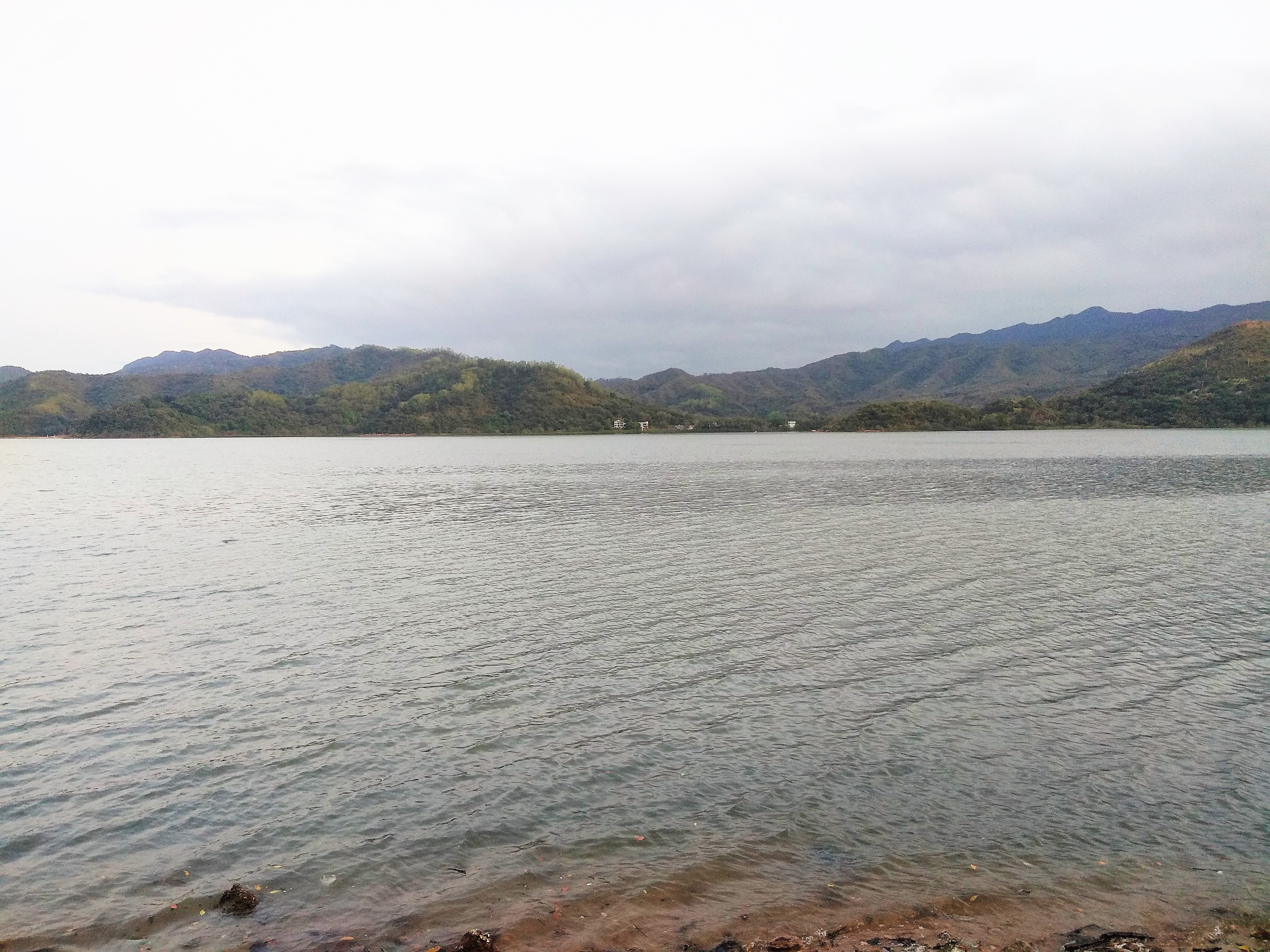
Distant view of Kai Kuk Shue Ha across Starling Inlet.

Kai Kuk Shue Ha (Chinese: 雞谷樹下) is a village in the North District of Hong Kong.

== Administration ==
Kai Kuk Shue Ha is a recognized village under the New Territories Small House Policy. It is one of the villages represented within the Sha Tau Kok District Rural Committee. For electoral purposes, Kai Kuk Shue Ha is part of the Sha Ta constituency, which is currently represented by Ko Wai-kei.

== History ==
At the time of the 1911 census, the population of Kai Kuk Shue Ha was 108. The number of males was 47.

== See also ==
- Starling Inlet
- Kuk Po
- Nam Hang Mei
