= Nam Hang Mei =

Hong Kong village

Coordinates: 22.522262°N 114.222897°E

Nam Hang Mei (Chinese: 南坑尾) or Ham Hang Mei (鹹坑尾) is a village in the North District of Hong Kong.

== See also ==
- Kai Kuk Shue Ha
- Kuk Po
