= A Chau =

Uninhabited island of Hong Kong

Native name: 鴉洲
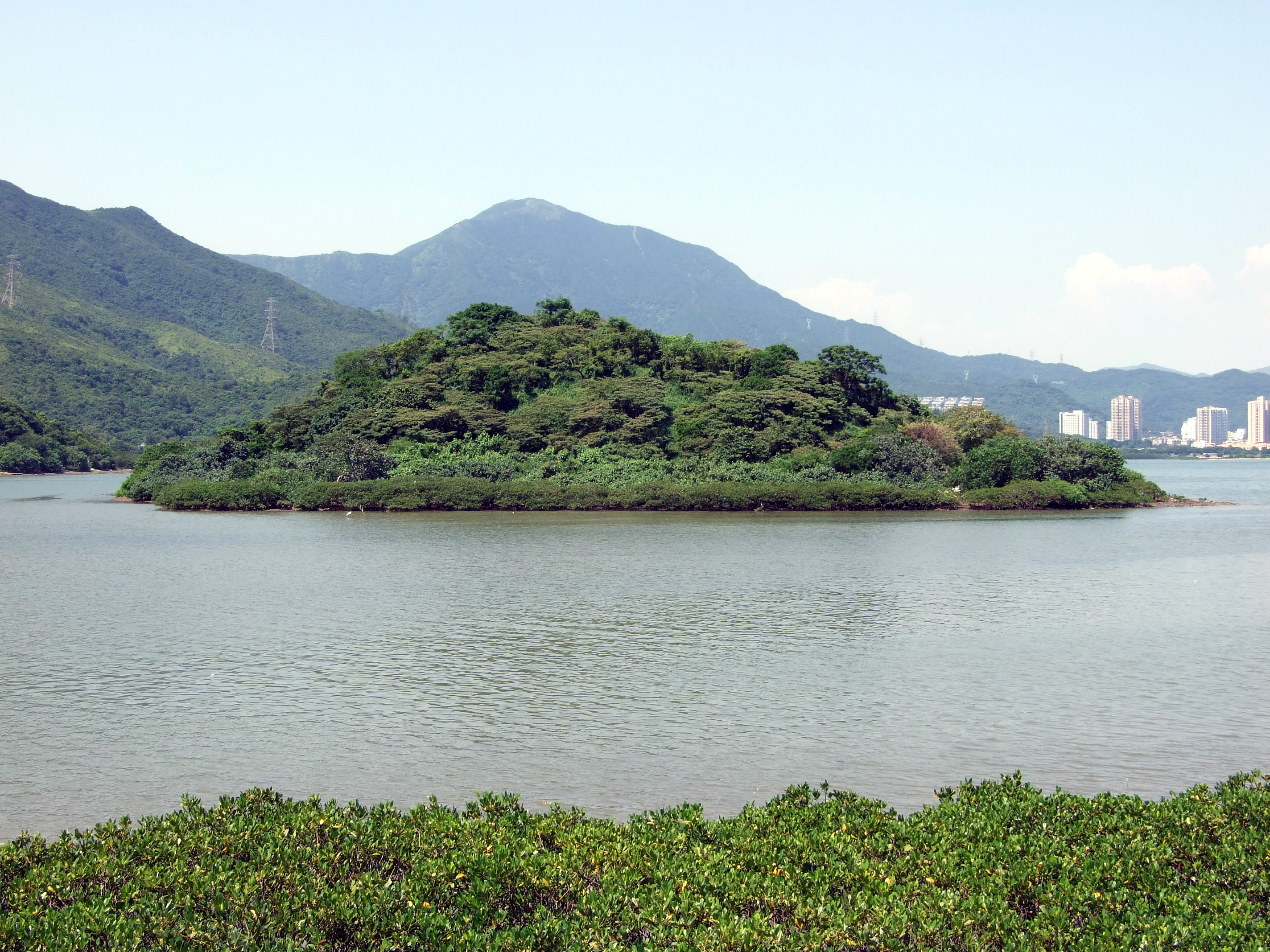
- View of A Chau

- Location within Hong Kong

Geography
- Coordinates: 22°31′39.72″N 114°12′38.95″E

Administration
- Hong Kong
- Districts: North District

A Chau
- Traditional Chinese: 鴉洲
Transcriptions
Standard Mandarin
- Hanyu Pinyin: Yāzhōu
Yue: Cantonese
- Yale Romanization: Āa jāu
- Jyutping: Aa1 zau1

A Chau (Chinese: 鴉洲) is a small uninhabited island in the southeast of Starling Inlet (Sha Tau Kok Hoi), off Nam Chung, in the north-eastern New Territories of Hong Kong. It is under the administration of North District, and falls within the Closed Area.

== Geography ==
Starling Inlet is a sheltered bay in the north-eastern New Territories of Hong Kong with a surface area of approximately 500 hectares. It is surrounded by fragmentary wetlands and hills. A Chau is a small island in the southeast of the bay. It is covered with vegetation and has a landmass of around one hectare.

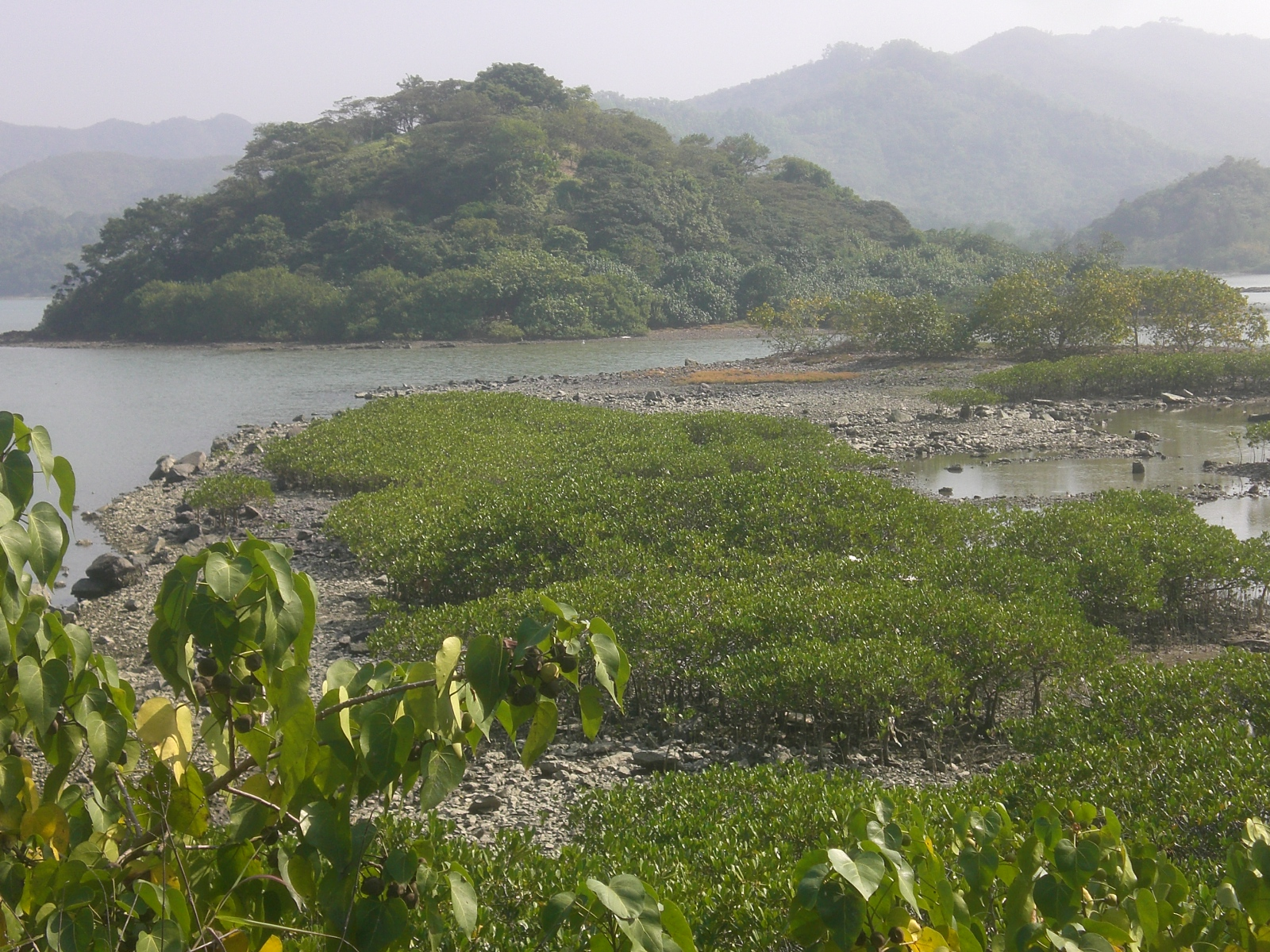
View of A Chau

== Fauna ==
A Chau has been designated as a Site of Special Scientific Interest since 1985. The fauna of the island includes night heron, little egret, great egret, black-headed gull and herring gull. It is also a breeding site for the passage migrants. It was reported in 2007 that A Chau was the largest egretry in Hong Kong and may also have been one of the most important night roosting sites for the ardeids in winter. A 2001 survey found that A Chau was the nesting site for the majority of great egrets, cattle egrets, and black-crowned night herons in Hong Kong, hosting 63%, 46%, and 71% of those respective species' nests.

During the early 2000s, several threats to the birds of A Chau were noted, including illegal collection of eggs and young, invasive climbers, and human disturbances at nearby wetlands.

== See also ==
- List of islands and peninsulas of Hong Kong
- Yim Tso Ha
