= Sam Tung Uk Resite Village =

Village of Hong Kong

Coordinates: 22.379905°N 114.130559°E

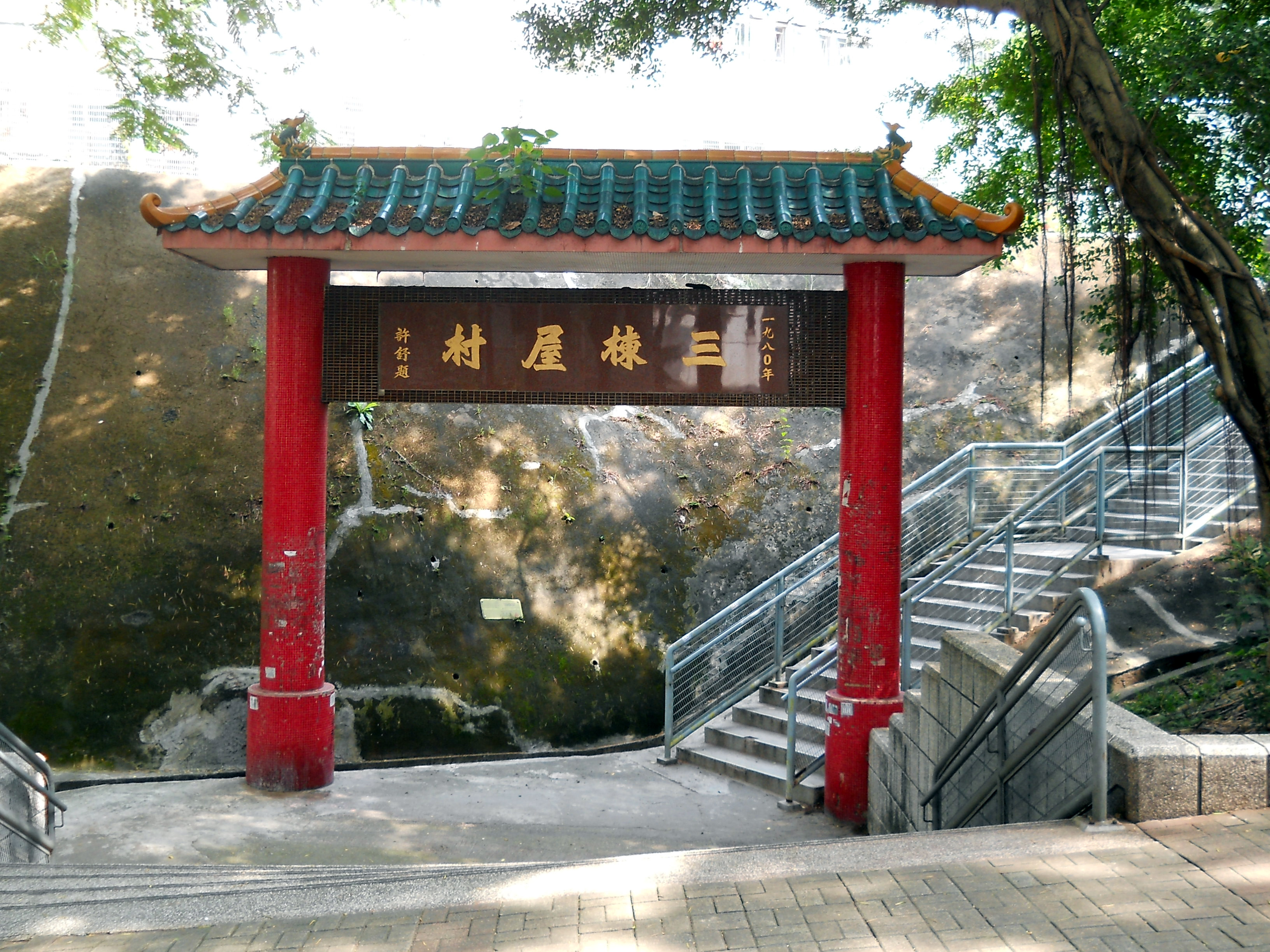
Paifang of Sam Tung Uk Resite Village.

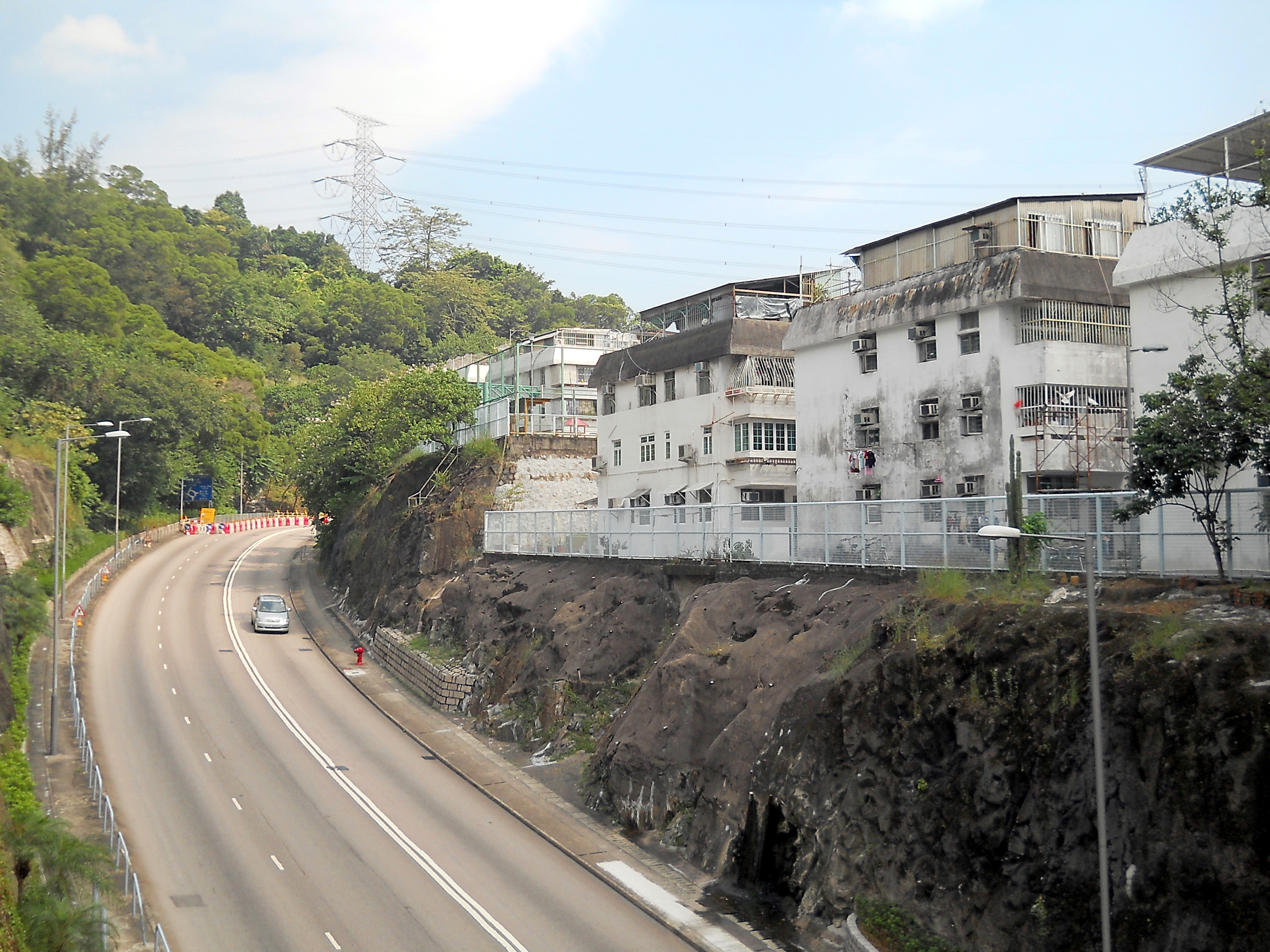
View of Sam Tung Uk Resite Village across Sam Tung Uk Road.

Sam Tung Uk Resite Village, or Sam Tung Uk Village (Chinese: 三棟屋村), is a village in Tsuen Wan District, Hong Kong.

== Administration ==
Sam Tung Uk is a recognized village under the New Territories Small House Policy.

== See also ==
- Sam Tung Uk Museum
