= Luk Keng Wong Uk =

Village in Hong Kong

Coordinates: 22°31′16″N 114°12′57″E

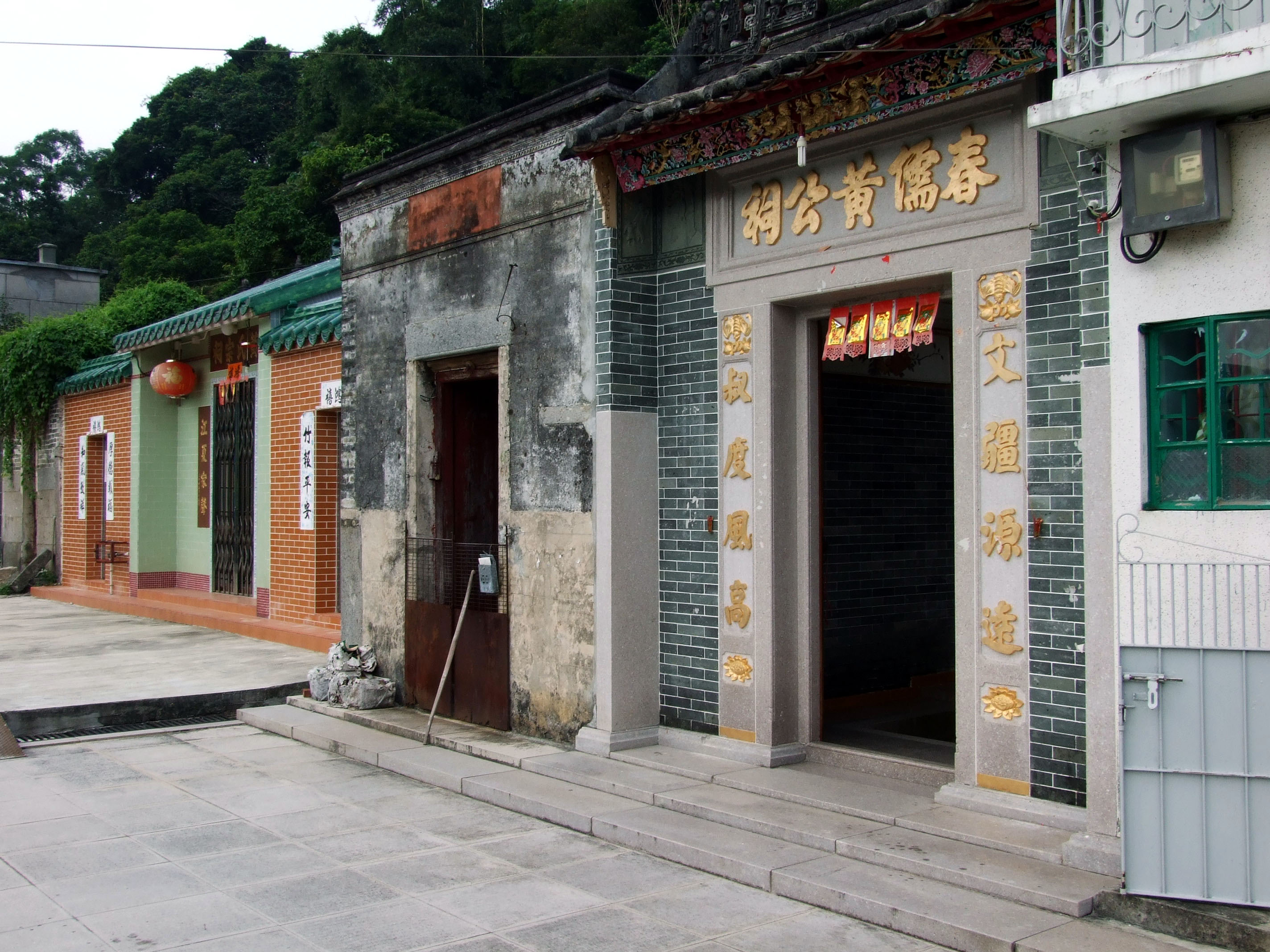
Wong Chun Yu Ancestral Hall in Luk Keng Wong Uk.

Luk Keng Wong Uk (Chinese: 鹿頸黃屋) is a village situated in the Luk Keng area, in the northeastern part of the New Territories, Hong Kong.

== Administration ==
Luk Keng Wong Uk is a recognized village under the New Territories Small House Policy. It is one of the villages represented within the Sha Tau Kok District Rural Committee. For electoral purposes, Luk Keng Wong Uk is part of the Sha Ta constituency, which is currently represented by Ko Wai-kei.
