= Luk Keng (North District) =

Area in North District, Hong Kong

Coordinates: 22°31′32″N 114°12′55″E

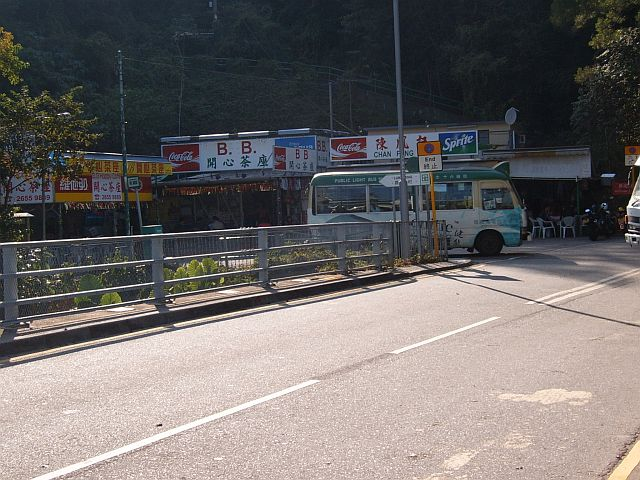
- The northern end of Luk Keng, by Luk Keng Road
- Interactive map of Luk Keng
- SAR: Hong Kong
- District: North District

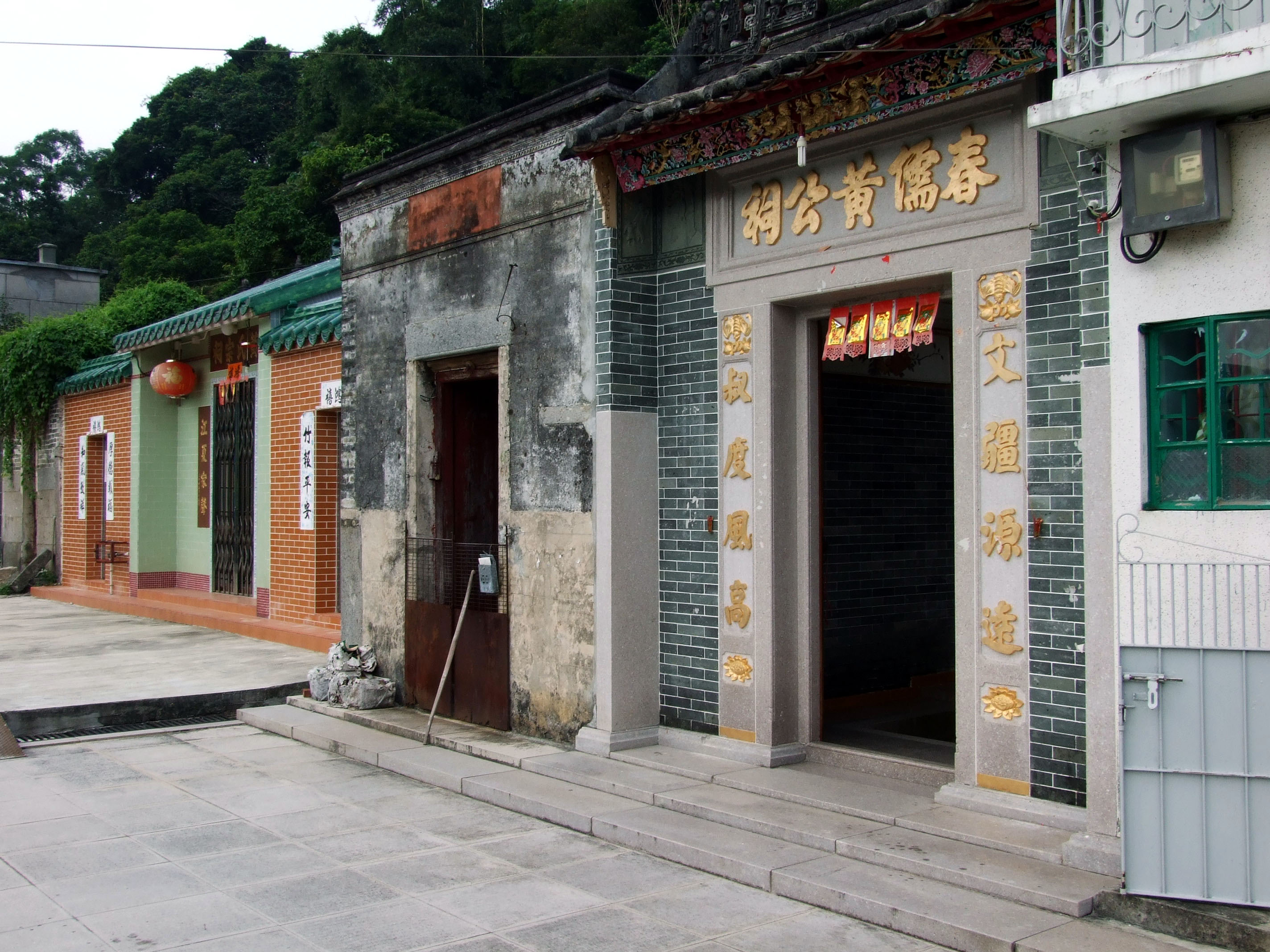
Wong Chun Yu Ancestral Hall, in Luk Keng Wong Uk.

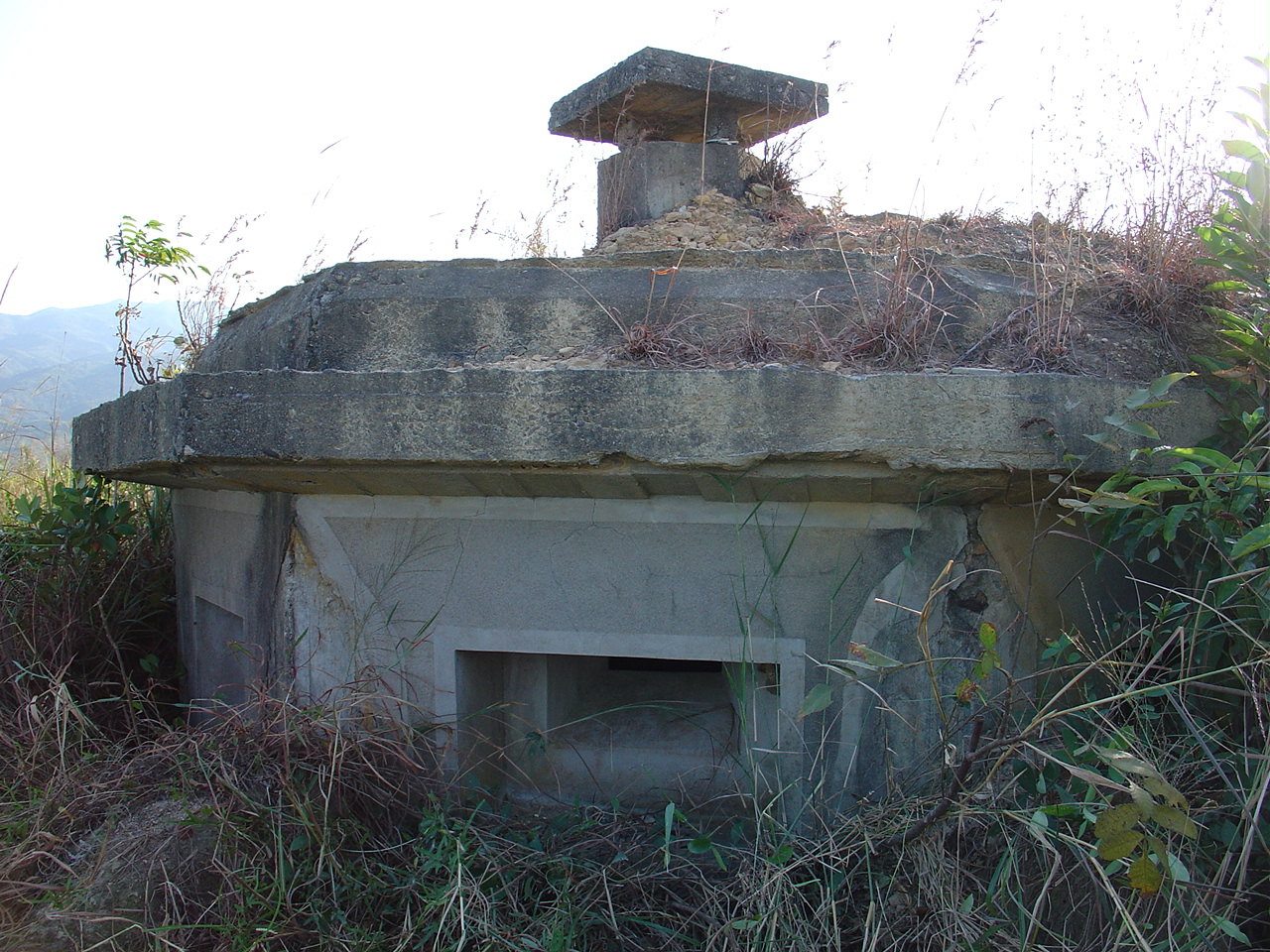
Pillbox in Luk Keng.

Luk Keng (Chinese: 鹿頸; lit. 'deer's neck') is an area in the North District of Hong Kong.

== Administration ==
Luk Keng is one of the villages represented within the Sha Tau Kok District Rural Committee. For electoral purposes, Luk Keng is part of the Sha Ta constituency, which is currently represented by Ko Wai-kei.

== Location ==
Luk Keng is located in the northeastern part of the New Territories, to the south west of Sha Tau Kok, east of Nam Chung and to the south of the Starling Inlet (Sha Tau Kok Hoi).

== History ==
One of the earliest documentations of Luk Keng was in “Yuet Dai Gei” (粵大記) written during the Ming dynasty in the mid-16th century.

Luk Keng consists of villages of different clans, namely the Wong clan, the Chan clan, and the Lam clan.

Four ancestral halls can be found in Luk Keng, notably: Wong Chun Yu Ancestral Hall (春儒黃公祠), constructed in the Kangxi reign of the Qing dynasty; The Chan Nam Tak Ancestral Hall (男德陳公祠) believed to be built in the Qianlong (1736–1795) reign of the Qing dynasty; The Chan Ancestral Hall (陳氏家祠) built in 1900.

In the past, Luk Keng was an important transportation hub for land and sea in the Sha Tau Kok area. Situated at the end of the Sha Tau Kok Road, goods were transported from the village pier via Shenzhen to other markets inland.

During 1910, around 12,500 people would pass through the Nam Chung-Luk Keng area each month, some carrying goods, while some using the road to travel southwards to Kowloon.

At the time of the 1911 census, the population of Luk Keng was 484. The number of males was 182.

== Villages ==
Luk Keng contains several villages, including:

- Luk Keng Chan Uk (鹿頸陳屋)
- Luk Keng Lam Uk (鹿頸林屋)
- Luk Keng Wong Uk (鹿頸黃屋)

== Features ==
Luk Keng is the site of a World War II network of defense, comprising a trench system and 14 pillboxes, built by the Japanese using forced local labor during the later years of the Japanese occupation of Hong Kong. The network is located on a 120 m hill overlooking Starling Inlet. Originally thought to be aimed at coping with an anticipated Allied landing in the Mirs Bay Area, it is later believed by scholars that it is mainly used for suppressing local anti-Japanese activity and infiltration from the mainland. (Note: In the 2009 Historic Building Appraisal by AAB, its purpose is said to be used for defense against allied powers. But in a 2021 article by HKU press says that it is built mainly to suppress local anti-Japanese activity.) In 2009, the Luk Keng Pillboxes and Observation Posts have been listed as Grade II historic buildings.

== Flora and fauna ==
Luk Keng is known for its natural scenery and wildlife, which is in contrast to Hong Kong's urbanized landscape.

Surrounded by Feng Shui woodland, Luk Keng is Hong Kong's largest freshwater swamp area. It contains a variety of habitats such as freshwater streams, mangroves, and brackish wetlands. Altogether it hosts over 50 dragonflies species and around 64 species of butterflies, while also hosting the endemic dragonfly species Macromidia ellenae. Rare animals such as the scarlet dwarf dragonfly and black-faced spoonbill have been sighted in Luk Keng.

== Transportation ==
The closest station to Luk Keng on the MTR is Fanling station. Green minibus No. 56K runs to the Luk Keng terminus.

== See also ==
- Nam Chung
- Luk Keng Wong Uk
