= Sheung Wo Hang =

Hakka village in Hong Kong

Coordinates: 22.523672°N 114.195193°E

- Traditional Chinese: 上禾坑
- Literal meaning: Upper Wo Hang, with Wo Hang meaning "valley of rice"
Transcriptions
Yue: Cantonese
- Yale Romanization: Seuhng wòh hāang
- Jyutping: Soeng6 wo5 haang1

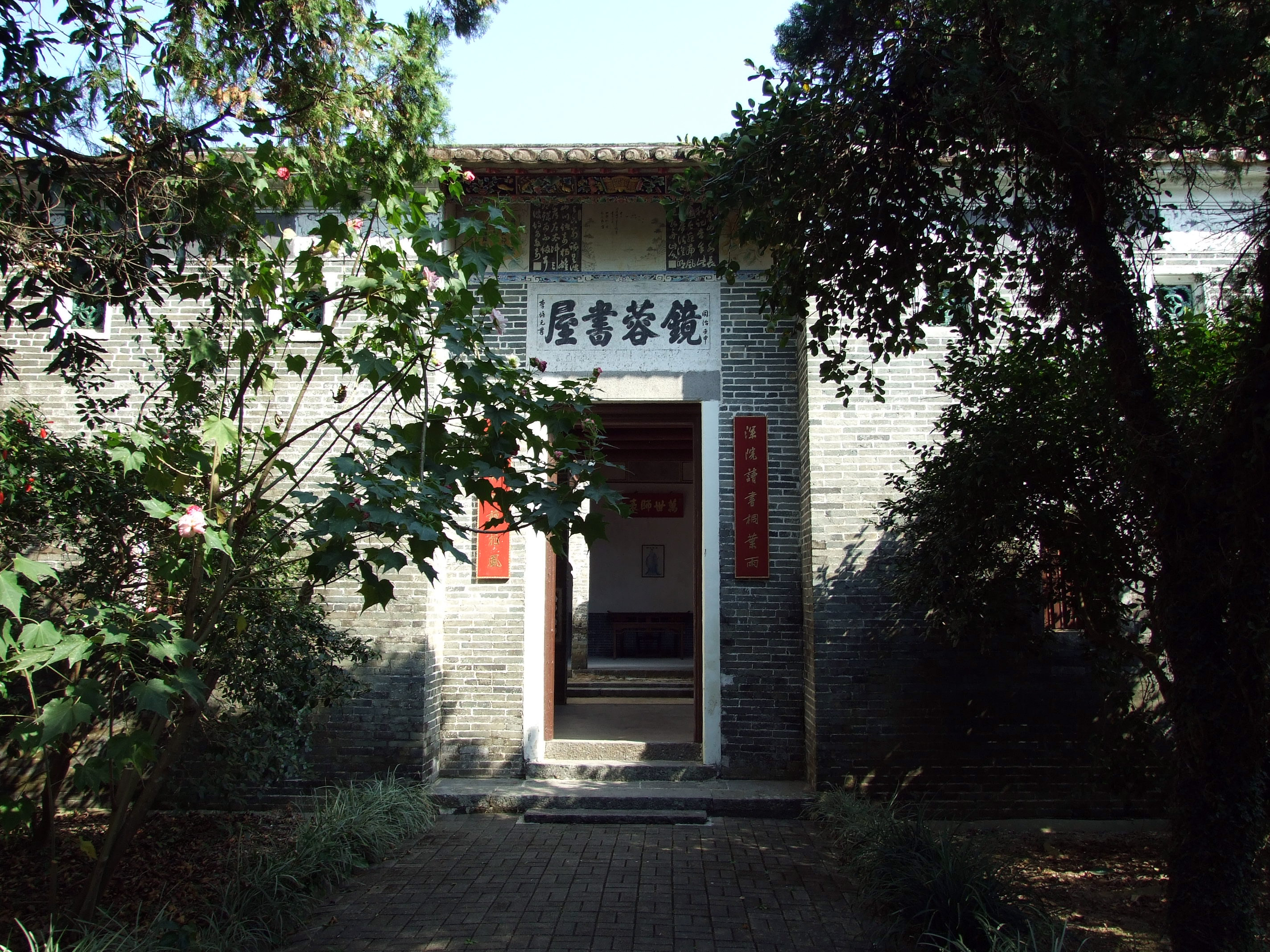
Kang Yung Study Hall.

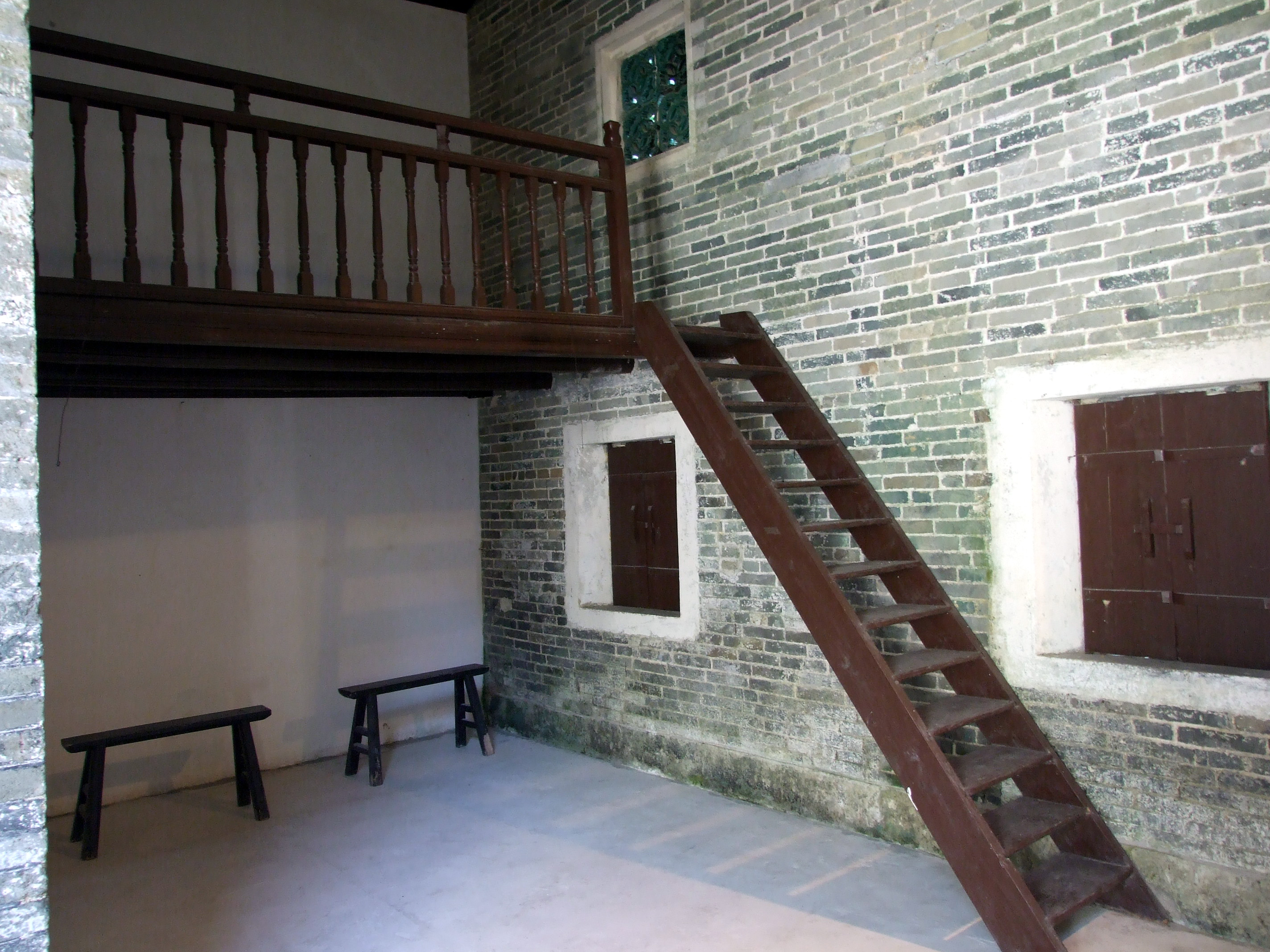
Interior of Kang Yung Study Hall.

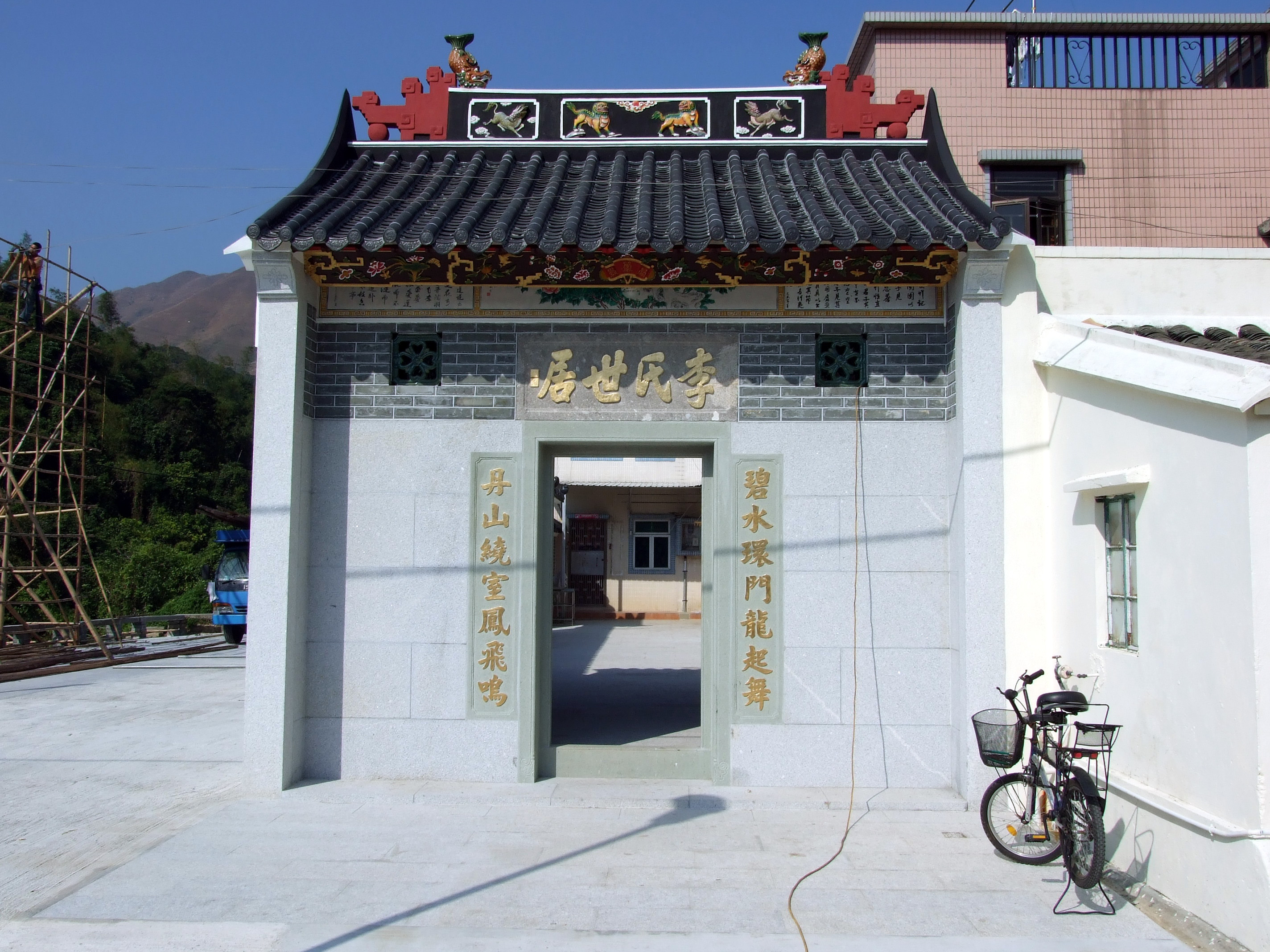
Lee Sze Sai Kui (李氏世居) Entrance Gate. Entrance to a close compound comprising the Lee Ancestral Hall and four residential houses.

Sheung Wo Hang is a Hakka village in Wo Hang, Sha Tau Kok, in the North District of Hong Kong. It is occupied by members of Hakka Li (李) Clan. Until the 18th century, the village was known as Wo Hang (禾坑).

== Administration ==
Sheung Wo Hang is a recognized village under the New Territories Small House Policy. It is one of the villages represented within the Sha Tau Kok District Rural Committee. For electoral purposes, Sheung Wo Hang is part of the Sha Ta constituency, which is currently represented by Ko Wai-kei.

== History ==
Before the arrival of the Lis, Wo Hang was occupied by the Hos (何), the Tsangs (曾) and the Tangs (鄧). Lee Tak-wah (李德華), a member of the Lis, moved to Wo Hang in 1698, shortly after the end of the Great Clearance. Kuen-lam (權林), son of Tak-wah, built an Ancestral Hall in the village. The feng shui of the hall was considered harmful to the Hos, the Tsangs and the Tangs and they left the village. Members of the Li Clan later branched out to found the two nearby villages of Ha Wo Hang ("lower Wo Hang") and Wo Hang Tai Long (禾坑大朗), in around 1730 and 1750 respectively. Wo Hang was subsequently renamed Sheung Wo Hang.

At the time of the 1911 census, the population of Sheung Wo Hang was 443. The number of males was 175.

Since the 1950s many inhabitants of the village have moved to urban areas in Hong Kong and abroad.

== Built heritage ==
The Kang Yung Study Hall (鏡蓉書屋) was built in the early Qing Dynasty by the Li Clan. The study hall was later converted into a public school, which closed in 1986. It is now a declared monument.

Other historical buildings include:

- Lee Sze Sai Kui (李氏世居) Entrance Gate. Built in the 18th century. Not graded.
- Lee ancestral hall (李氏祠堂). Not graded.
- Wing Kat Tong (永吉堂), a communal hall, at No. 18A. Probably built before 1905. Not graded.

== See also ==
- Walled villages of Hong Kong
