= Kang Yung Study Hall =

Historic study hall in Sheung Wo Hang Village, Hong Kong

Coordinates: 22.5222°N 114.1949°E

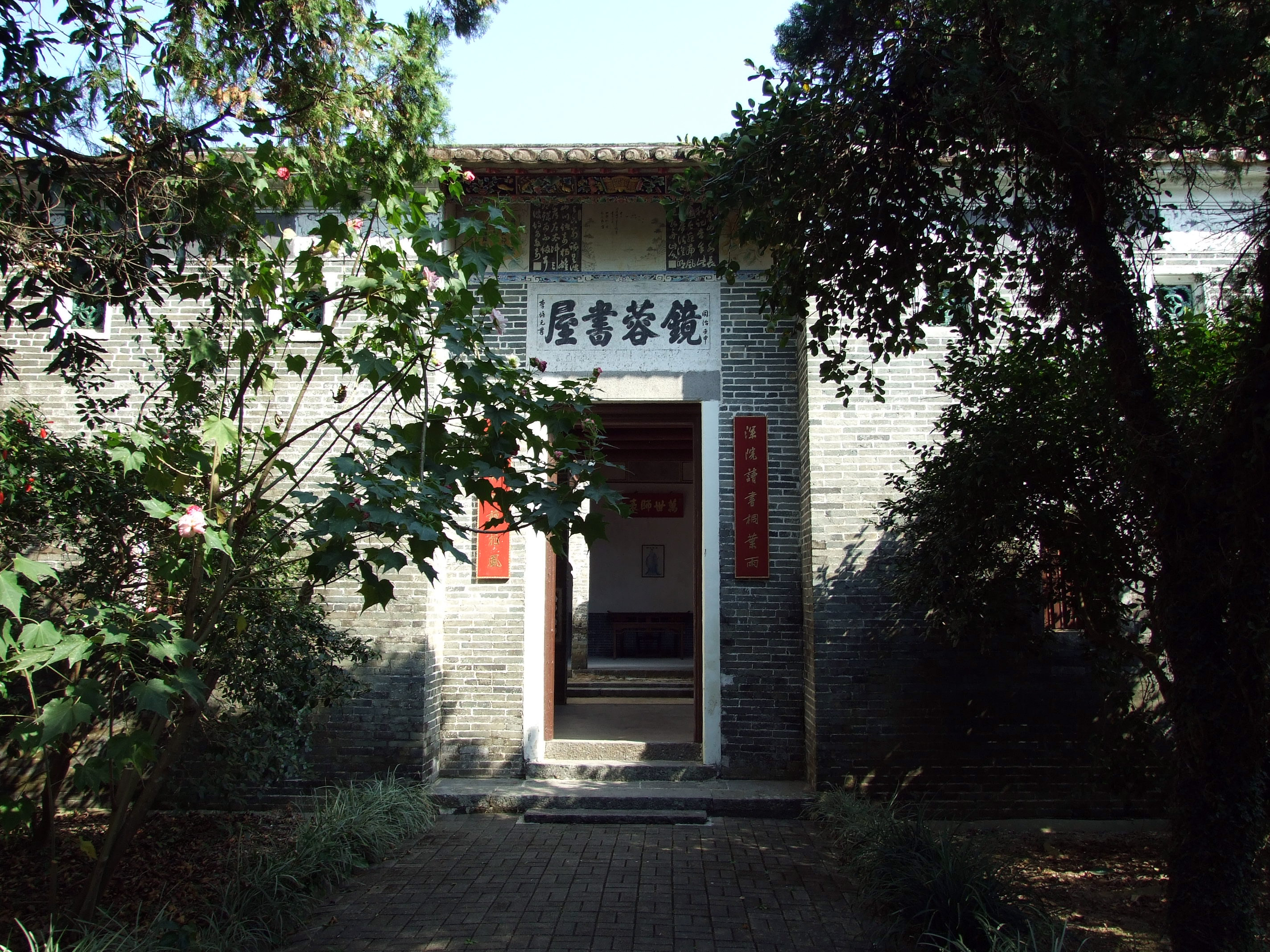
There is a hibiscus tree planted in front of Kang Yung Study Hall

Kang Yung Study Hall (Chinese: 鏡蓉書屋) is located in Sheung Wo Hang Village, Sha Tau Kok, New Territories, Hong Kong, and is one of the few study hall built specifically for teaching purposes. It was built in the early Qing dynasty by a Hakka family named Li from Sheung Wo Hang. The study hall was declared a monument in Hong Kong in 1991, and a comprehensive restoration was completed in 1993.

== History ==
=== Sheung Wo Hang ===
Sheung Wo Hang Village, a Hakka tribe that has existed for more than 300 years, is hidden among the mountains. At the end of the village is the Study Hall. In front of the door there is a century-old banyan tree, towering and lush.

=== Study Hall ===
Kang Yung Study Hall was built in the early Qing dynasty by the Hakka family Li from Wo Hang Village, Boluo County. At first, it was just a private school for five to ten children from the village and prepared the students for the Imperial Examination (科舉). Between 1736 and 1795 the study hall was converted into two floors. It was renovated again in 1872, and the four characters "Kang Yung Study Hall" were inscribed on it by Li Peiyuan (李培元), a famous scholar in Wo Hang at that time.

The study room was in operation until it was closed during World War II. After the war, it became temporary classrooms for a primary school, then a kindergarten, and finally remained vacant until it closed in the early 1970s.

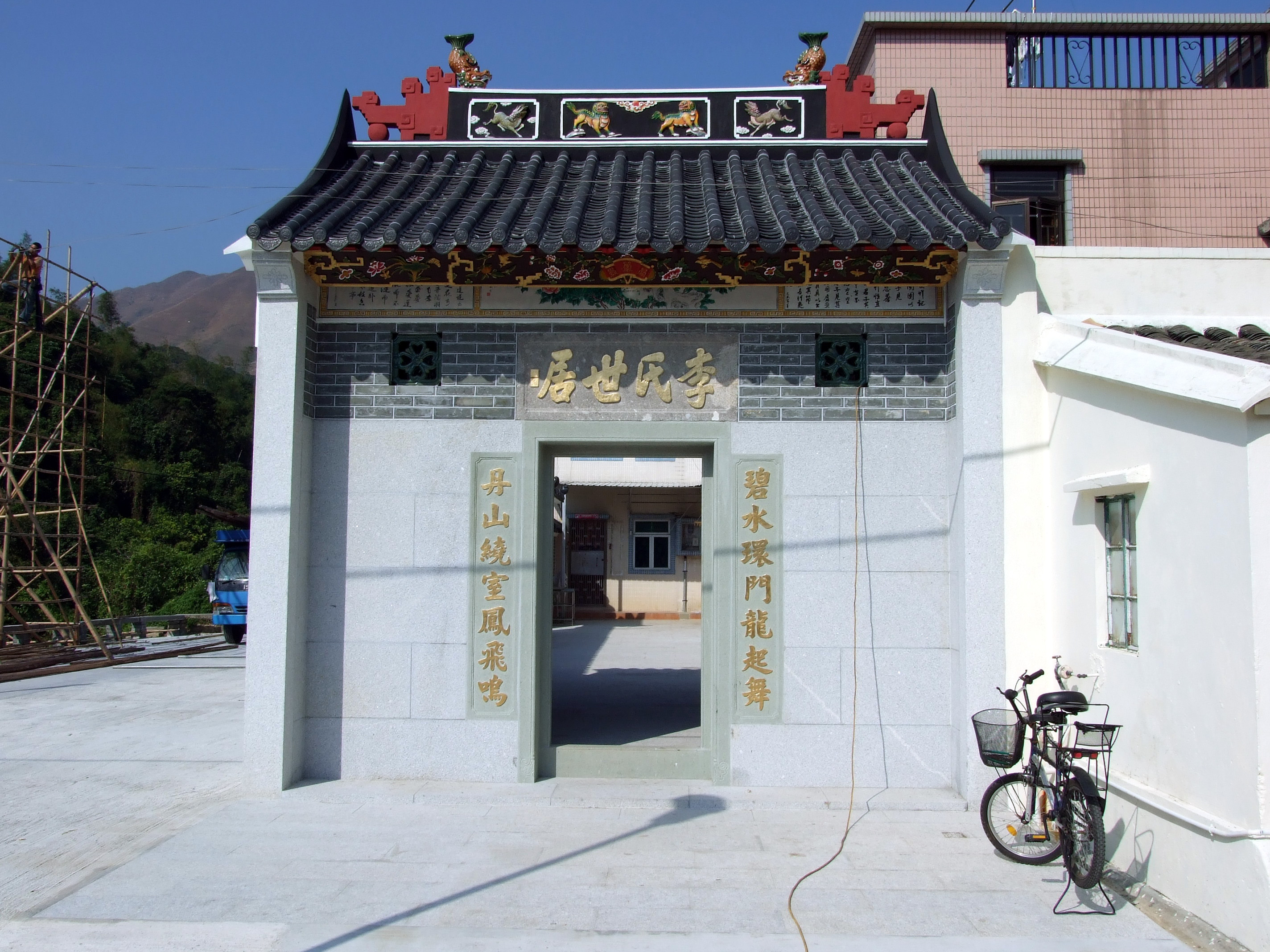
Li Clan Ancestral Hall

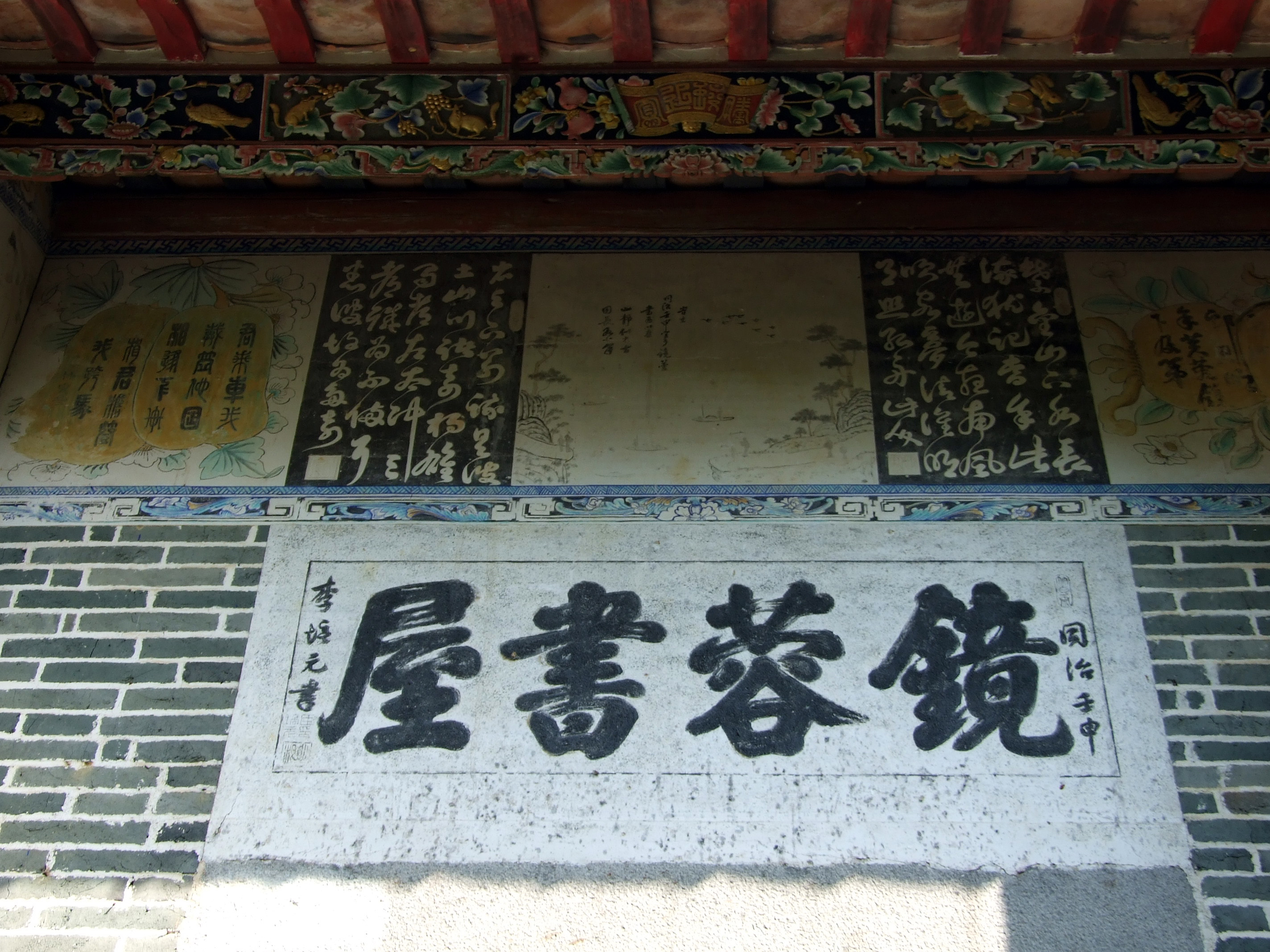
"Kang Yung Study Hall" were inscribed on it by Li Peiyuan

== Naming ==
There are two theories about the origin of the name of the study hall.

One theory is that it may be derived from the Tang dynasty Zhiguai xiaoshuo (筆記小說)Miscellaneous Morsels from Youyang (酉陽雜俎). The story mentions that when Li Guyan (李固言) failed the imperial examination and traveled to Sichuan, he met an old woman who predicted that "you will pass the imperial examination next year under the lotus mirror" (郎君明年芙蓉鏡下及第). Sure enough, the next year's exam question was "Girl, mirror and lotus" (人鏡芙蓉; refers to a beautiful woman with outstanding appearance, as beautiful as a lotus in the mirror), and Li passed the imperial examinations as the highest scorer in the Jinshi class.

Another theory is related to Tang Yung-kang (鄧蓉鏡), a student of Lung Yeuk Tau in Fanling. Tang passed the imperial examination in 1871, which was unprecedented in the area for 200 years, so the study hall was named "Kang Yung" to commemorate him. However, some villagers believe that the study hall was named earlier than 1872.

Kang Yung Study Hall has cultivated many scholars and attracted many students from Tai Po, Shatin and Tsuen Wan to come and study as boarders. The study hall was later transformed into a rural primary school. In the summer of 1986, after the last batch of students left the school, the study hall officially closed.

Kang Yung Study Hall witnessed the early educational history of Hong Kong and was therefore declared a statutory monument in April 1991.

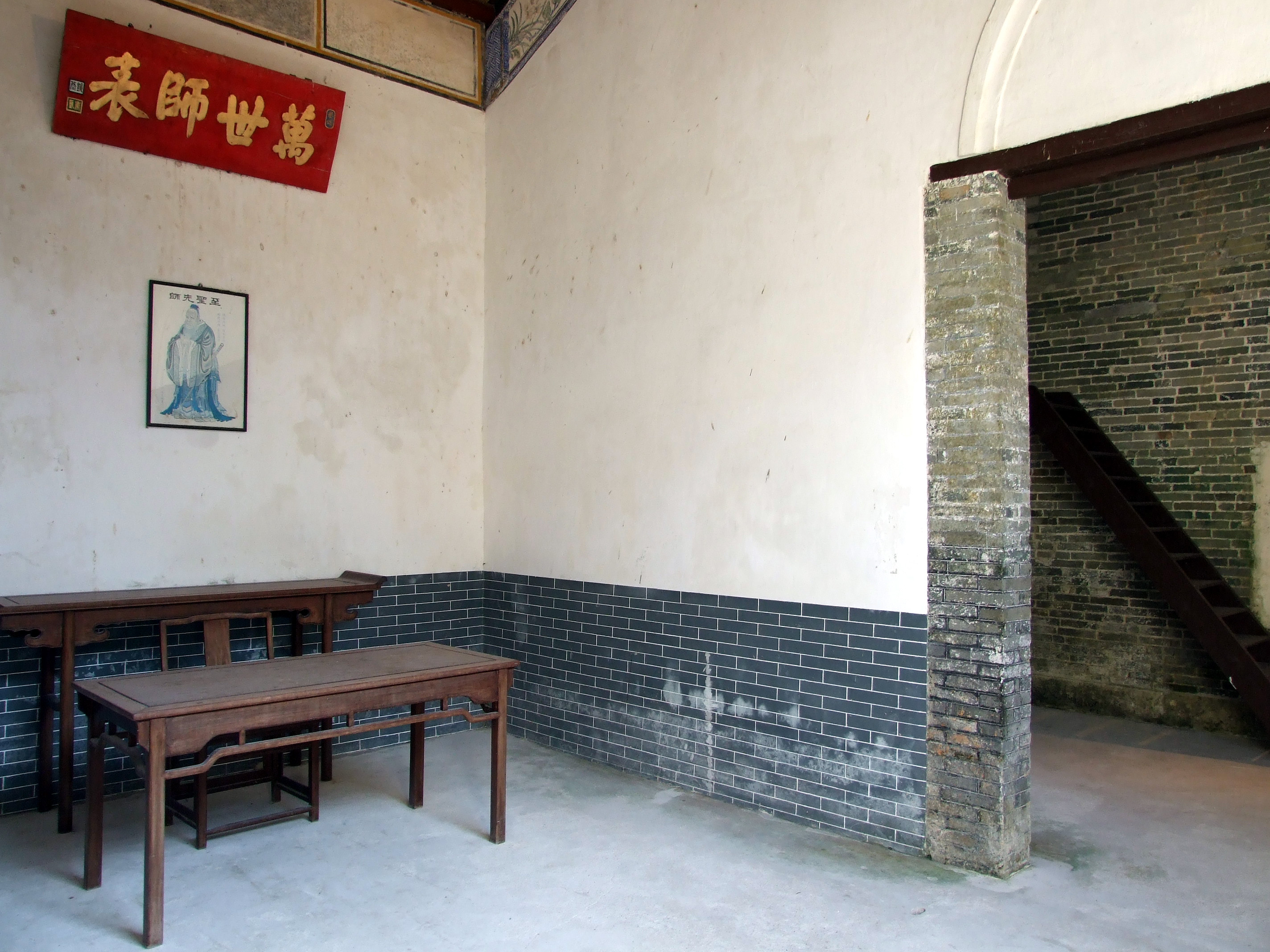
The main hall is dedicated to Confucius

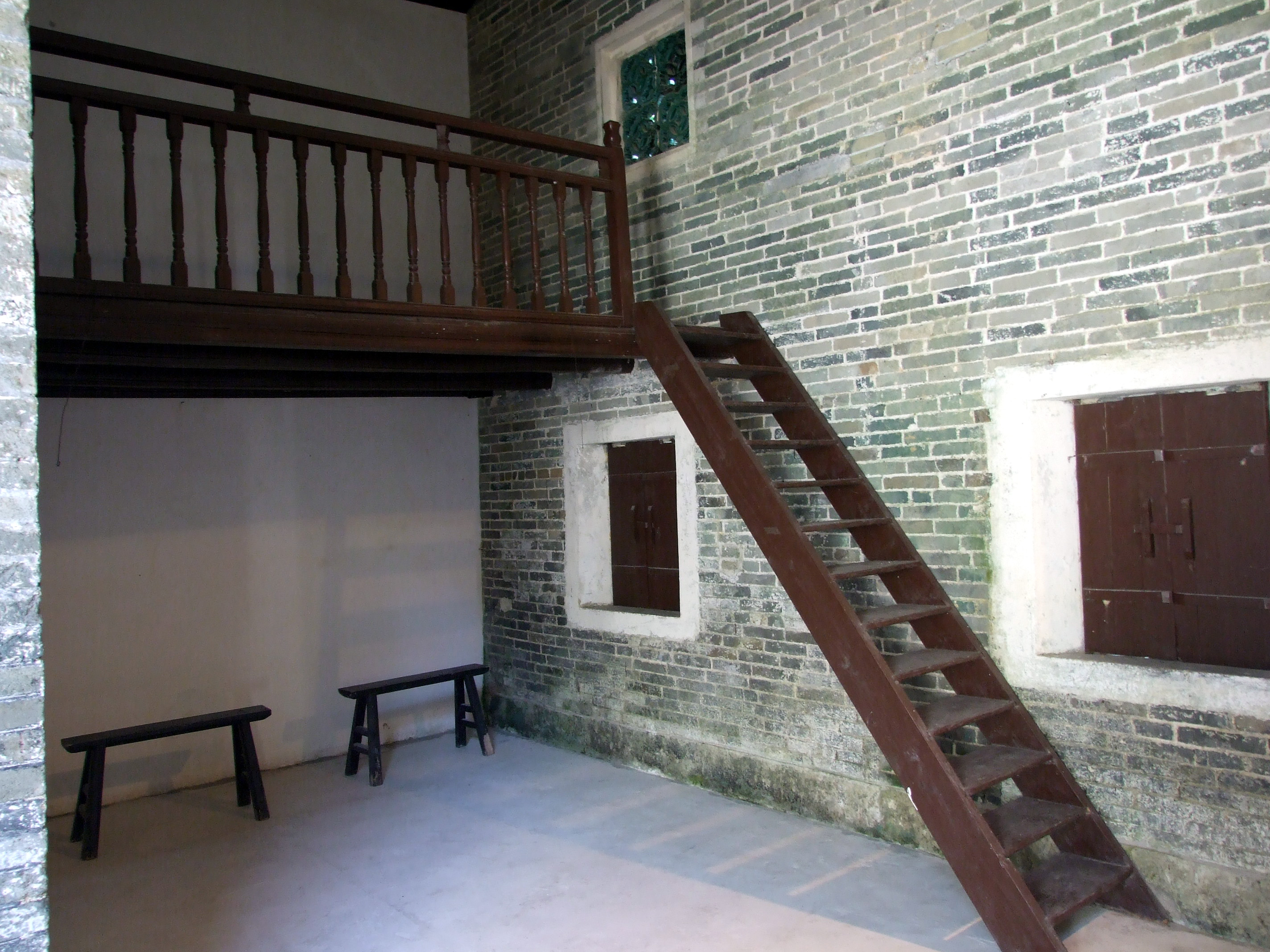
Stairs to the upper floor

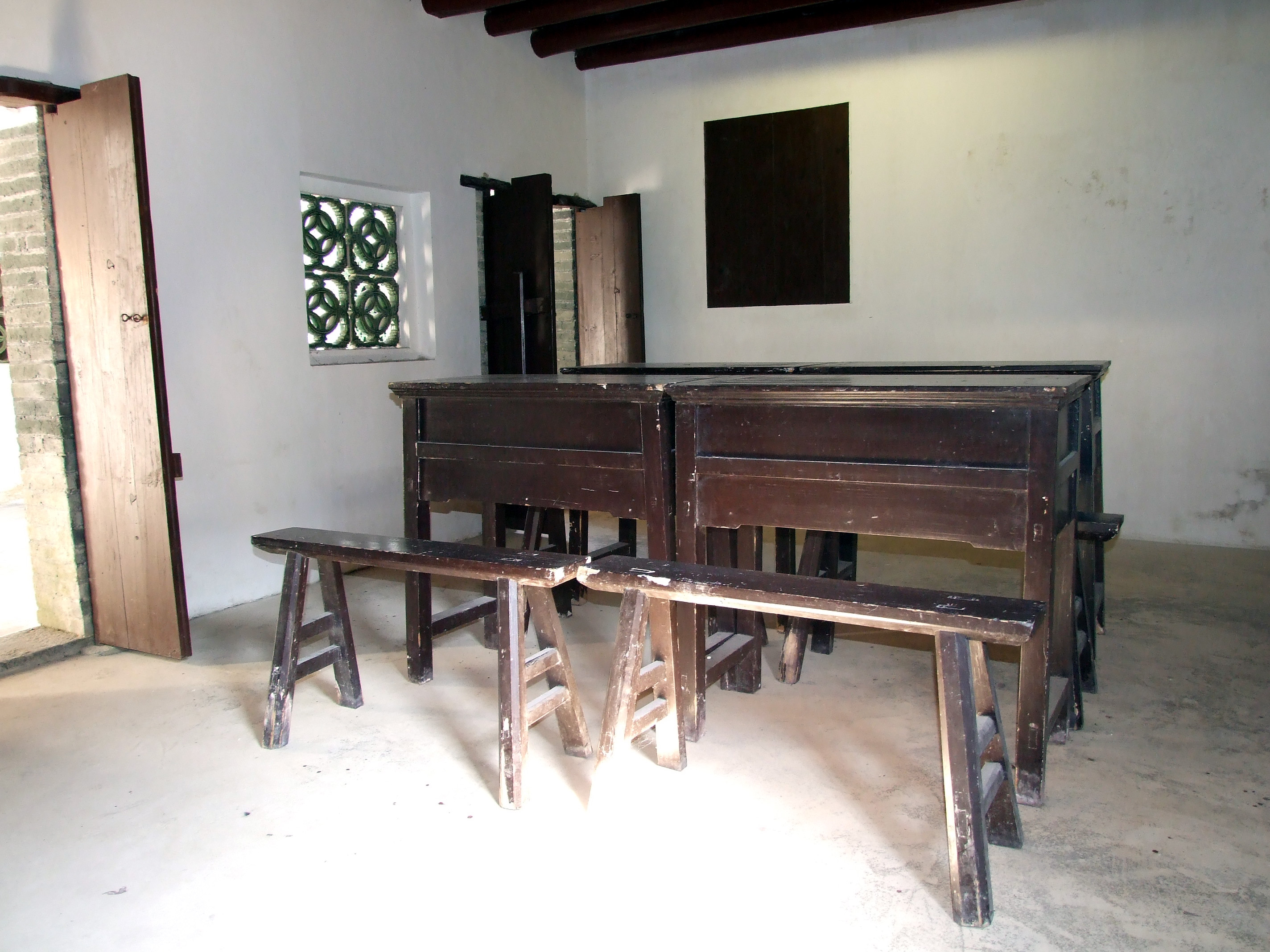
The side hall is used as a classroom
