= Beverly =

Beverly or Beverley may refer to:

== Places ==
=== Australia ===
- Beverley, South Australia, a suburb of Adelaide
- Beverley, Western Australia, a town
- Shire of Beverley, Western Australia

=== Canada ===
- Beverly, Alberta, a town that amalgamated with the City of Edmonton in 1961
- Beverley, Saskatchewan

=== United Kingdom ===
- Beverley, a market town, and the county town of the East Riding of Yorkshire, England
  - Beverley railway station
  - Beverley Beck
  - Beverley Racecourse
  - Beverley Rural District
  - Beverley (UK Parliament constituency)
  - East Yorkshire Borough of Beverley
- Beverley Brook, a minor tributary of the River Thames in south west London

=== United States ===
- Beverly, Chicago, Illinois, a community area
- Beverly, Georgia, an unincorporated community
- Beverly, Kansas, a city
- Beverly, Kentucky
- Beverly, Massachusetts, a city
  - Beverly Depot (MBTA station)
- Beverly, Missouri, an unincorporated community
- Beverly, Nebraska, an unincorporated community
- Beverly, New Jersey, a city
- Beverly, Ohio, a village
- Beverly, Washington, an unincorporated community
- Beverly, West Virginia, a town
- Beverly Creek, a stream in South Dakota
- Beverley (West Virginia), a historic farm near Charles Town
- Beverly (Pocomoke City, Maryland), a historic home
- Beverly (Princess Anne, Maryland), a historic home

== Music ==
- Beverly (band), a Brooklyn-based indie band
- Beverley Sisters, a British singing trio of the 1950s and 1960s
- Beverly (singer), a Filipina singer based in Japan

== Other uses ==
- Beverly (catamaran), an American catamaran that won various events in the early 1960s
- Beverly (drink), an apéritif made by Coca-Cola in Italy
- Beverly (mango), a mango cultivar
- Beverly (name), including a list of people and fictional characters with the given name or surname Beverly or Beverley
- Beverly the Bug, the first known opal with an insect inclusion
- Beverly Garden, a public housing estate in Tseung Kwan O, Hong Kong
- Blackburn Beverley, a 1950s British heavy transport aircraft

== See also ==
- The Beverly Center, a monolithic shopping center in Los Angeles, California
- Beverly Hills (disambiguation)
- Edmonton Beverly-Clareview, Alberta, Canada, provincial electoral district
- Beverly Heights, Edmonton, Alberta, Canada, a neighbourhood
- Lower Beverley Lake, Ontario, Canada
