= Beverly Hills (disambiguation) =

Beverly Hills is a city in Los Angeles County, California, United States.

Beverly Hills may also refer to:

== Places ==
=== U.S. ===
- Beverly Hills, a neighborhood in Vallejo, California
- Beverly Hills, Florida
- Beverly, Chicago, Illinois, also called "Beverly Hills"
  - Five railway stations within the neighborhood:
    - 91st Street/Beverly Hills station
    - 95th Street/Beverly Hills station
    - 99th Street/Beverly Hills station
    - 103rd Street/Beverly Hills station
    - 107th Street/Beverly Hills station
- Beverly Hills, Baltimore, Maryland, a neighborhood
- Beverly Hills, Michigan
- Beverly Hills, Missouri
- Beverly Hills, Texas
- Beverly Hills, Marion County, West Virginia
- Beverly Hills, a neighborhood in Huntington, West Virginia
- Beverly Hill, Texas, an unincorporated community

=== Other countries ===
- Beverly Hills, Cebu City, a subdivision of Cebu City, Philippines
- Beverly Hill (Hong Kong), Happy Valley, Hong Kong, a private residential estate in Happy Valley, Hong Kong
- The Beverly Hills, a private residential estate in Tai Po, Hong Kong
- Beverly Hills, Jamaica, Kingston, Jamaica
- Beverly Hills, New South Wales, a suburb of Sydney, Australia
- Beverley Hills, Western Cape, South Africa

== Television series and films ==
- Beverly Hills, 90210, an American teen drama produced by Aaron Spelling
- Beverly Hills Teens, an American animated children's television program
- The Beverly Hillbillies, an American sitcom, 1962 to 1971
- Beverly Hills Cop, an American action comedy film

== Other uses ==
- Beverly Hills (actress) (born 1966), British actress
- Beverly Hills Line, a suburban line of the Pacific Electric Railway
- Beverly Boulevard station, trolley line station in Upper Darby, Pennsylvania, USA once known as Beverly Hills
- "Beverly Hills" (Weezer song), the first single by Weezer from their fifth album Make Believe
- Beverly Hills (Zivert song), 2019
- Beverly Hills Supper Club fire, Southgate, Kentucky; 1977
- Monica Beverly Hillz, American drag queen
- Anastasia Beverly Hills, cosmetics company
