= Lam Tsuen (disambiguation) =

Lam Tsuen may refer to:

- Lam Tsuen, an area in Tai Po District, Hong Kong
- Lam Tsuen River, a river in Tai Po District, Hong Kong
- Lam Tsuen San Tsuen, a village in Lam Tsuen, Tai Po District, Hong Kong
- Lam Tsuen Valley, valley in the New Territories, Hong Kong
