= Tsuen =

Tsuen may refer to:

- Village in Cantonese
- Estate in Cantonese, particularly public housing estates
- Ha Tsuen, an area in the Yuen Long Town area of Hong Kong
- Lam Tsuen River, a river in Tai Po
- Lam Tsuen Valley, the valley through which the Lam Tsuen River flows
- Lam Tsuen wishing trees, a shrine in Lam Tsuen, Hong Kong
- Lam Tsuen, an area in Tai Po, in the New Territories of Hong Kong
- Lee Tsuen Seng, a Malaysian Badminton player
- Tsuen Wan (football club), a football team in the Hong Kong Football Association
- Tsuen Wan District, a district of the Hong Kong Special Administrative Region of China
- Tsuen Wan New Town, a town in the Hong Kong urban area
- Tsuen Wan, a bay in the New Territories of Hong Kong
- Yau Yat Tsuen, a residential area in Kowloon, Hong Kong
