= Tai Po Lookout Tower =

Landmark in Tai Po, Hong Kong

Coordinates: 22.4502°N 114.18°E

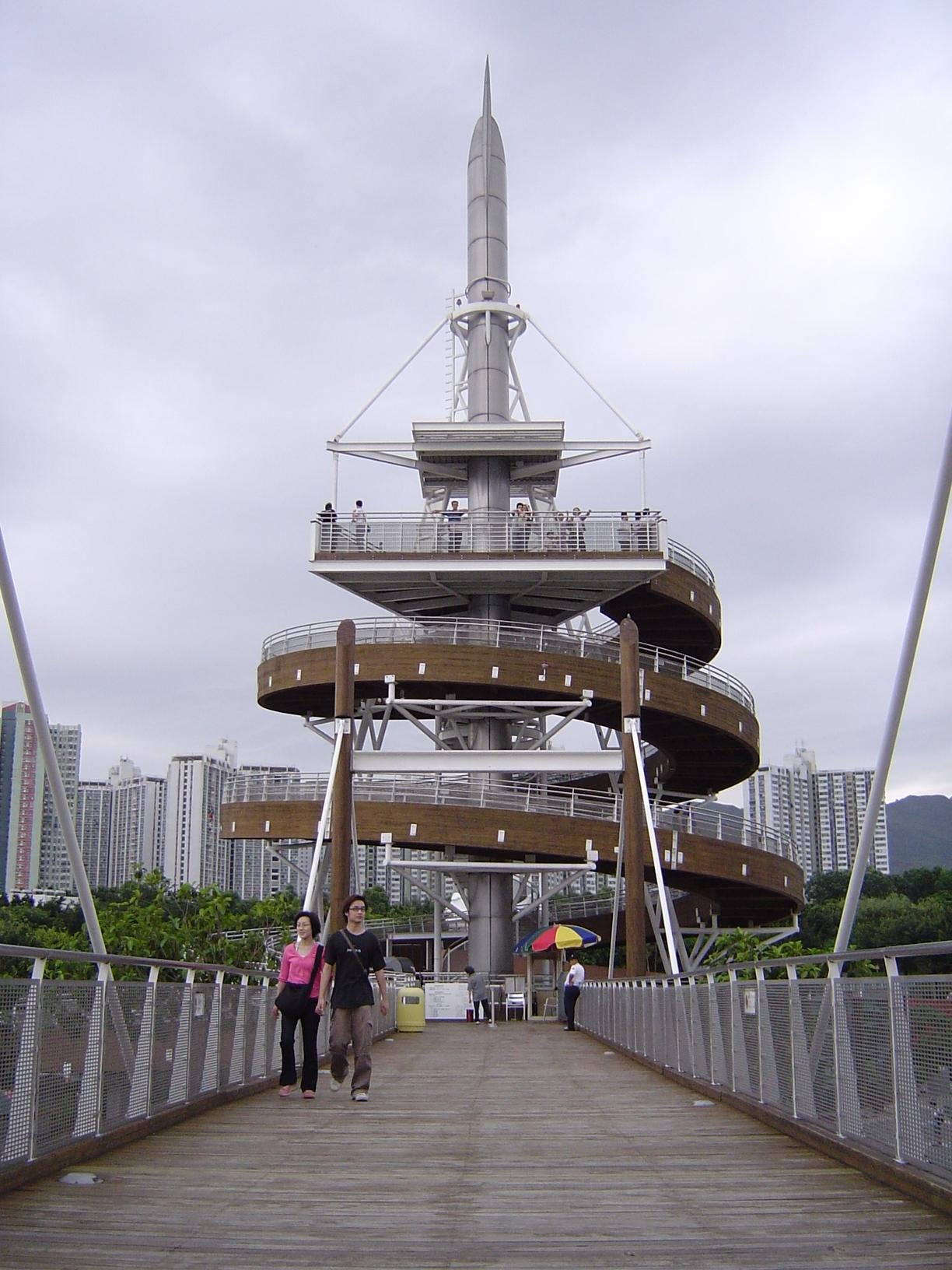
Tai Po Lookout Tower

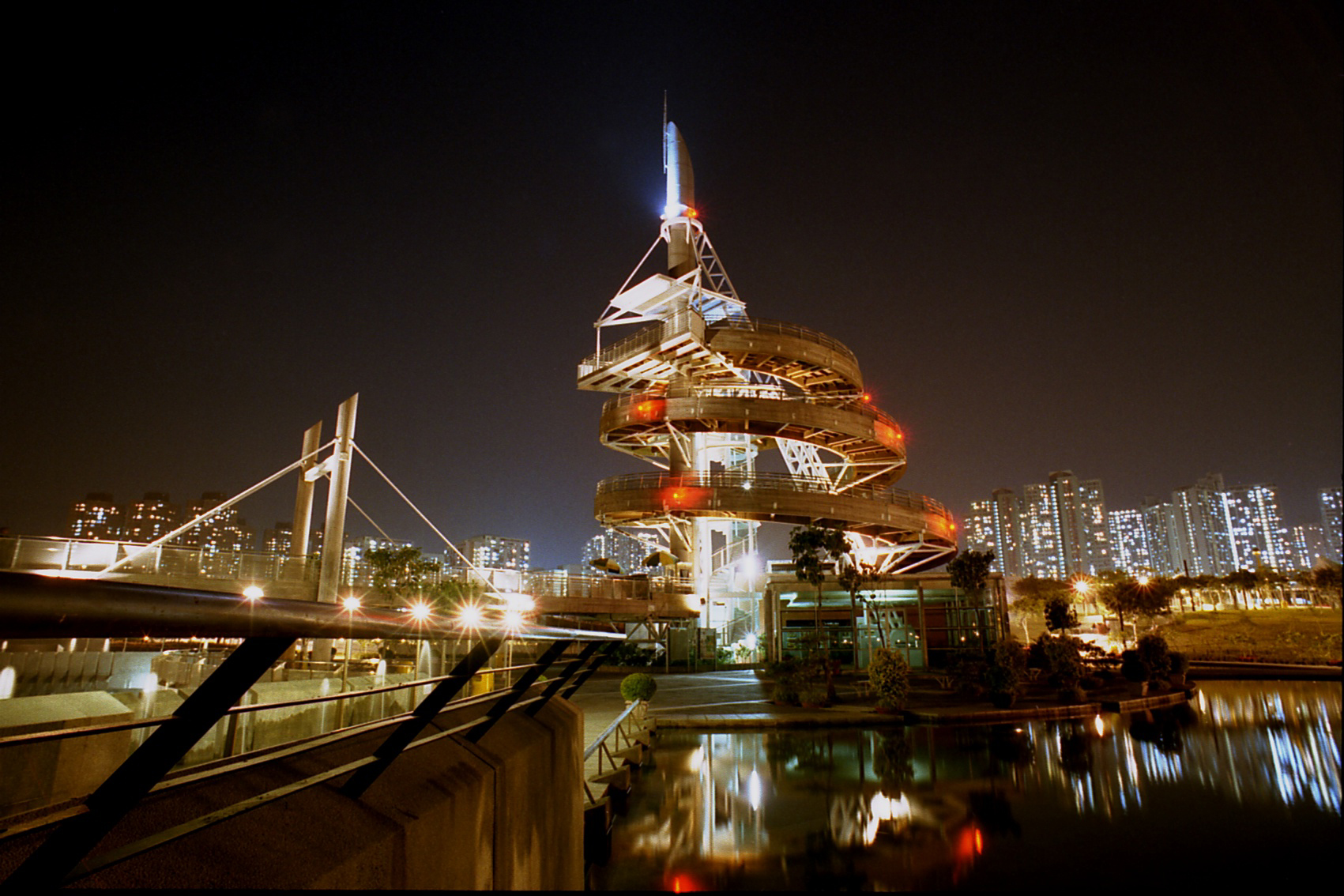
Tai Po Lookout Tower at night

Tai Po Lookout Tower (Chinese: 香港回歸紀念塔) is a large-scale landmark established to mark the transfer of sovereignty of Hong Kong to the PRC in 1997. It is located near the mouth of the Lam Tsuen River and next to the shore of Tolo Harbour, within Tai Po Waterfront Park, in Tai Po, Hong Kong.

Unrelated to the similarly named Tai Po Lookout (which is now a private residence), the Tai Po Lookout Tower is a local tourist attraction. The building is 32.4 metres tall. Visitors can reach the top to enjoy a bird's eye view over Tolo Harbour, the entire Tai Po Waterfront Park and the neighbouring Tai Po Industrial Estate.

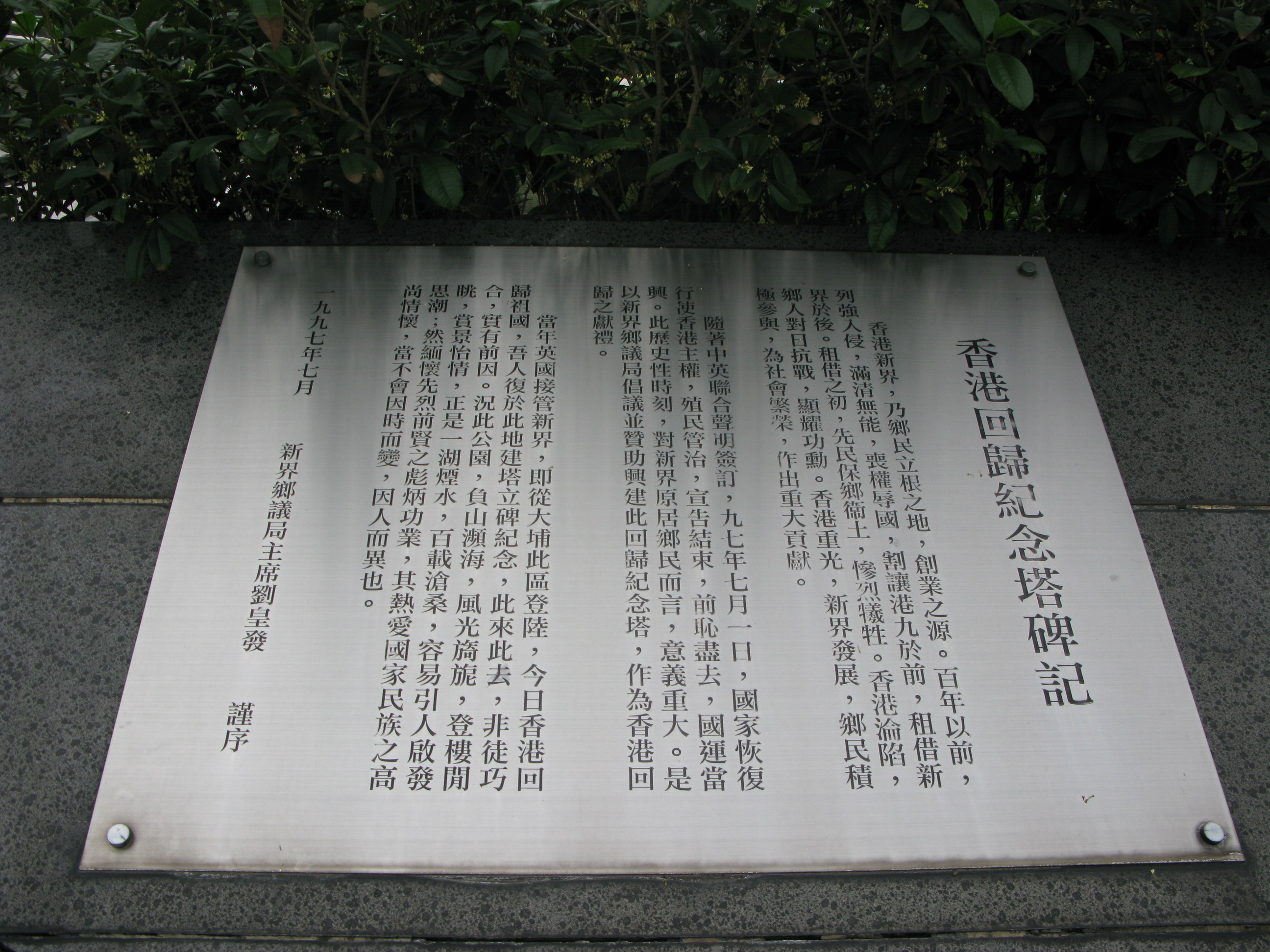
Hong Kong Tai Po Lookout Tower Memorial Tablet

An inscription on the lower part of the tower describes the rationale for the tower's construction, roughly summarised:

The inhabitants of the New Territories defended and sacrificed themselves for their own home in the early period when Hong Kong was ceded to Great Britain in 1898. They devoted to the development of the territory and significantly made a great contribution into society after the war time of Hong Kong falling into Japan's hands during the period of time from December 1941 to August 1945.

The inscription also points out that the location of the tower is exactly where the British government made a landing when taking over the New Territories. The tower, therefore, was built at the same place for the commemoration of the sovereignty handover.

== See also ==
- Golden Bauhinia Square
