= Shuen Wan Chan Uk =

Coordinates: 22.462034°N 114.207706°E

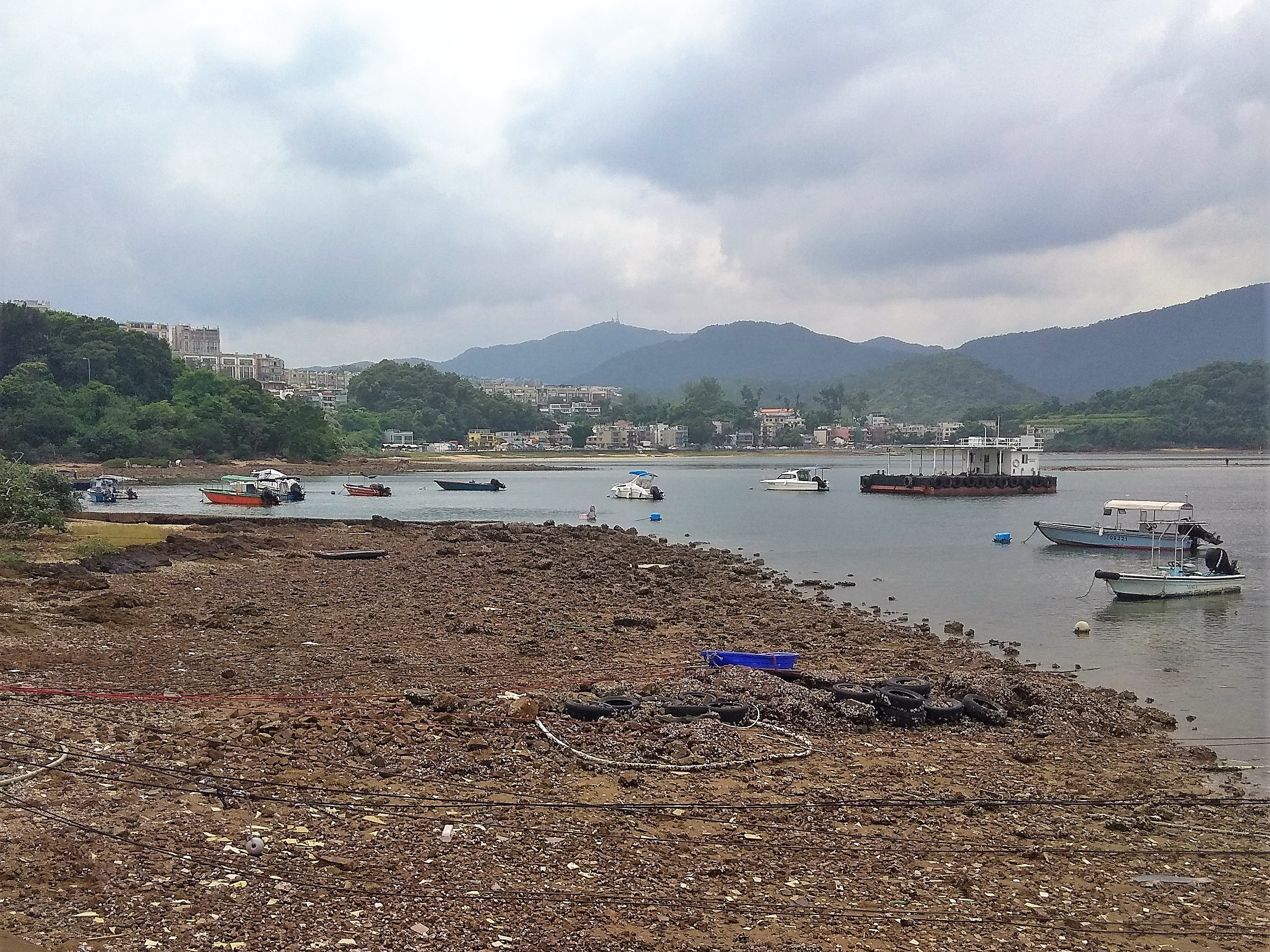
View of Luen Yick Pier. The Beverly Hills (left), Shuen Wan Sha Lan (centre) and Shuen Wan Chan Uk (right).

Shuen Wan Chan Uk (Chinese: 船灣陳屋) is a village in Tai Po District, Hong Kong.

== Administration ==
Shuen Wan Chan Uk is one of the villages represented within the Tai Po Rural Committee. For electoral purposes, Shuen Wan Chan Uk is part of the Shuen Wan constituency, which was formerly represented by So Tat-leung until October 2021.

Shuen Wan Chan Uk is a recognized village under the New Territories Small House Policy.

== See also ==
- Plover Cove
