= Tai Po District =

Tai Po 大埔區
- District
- Tai Po District
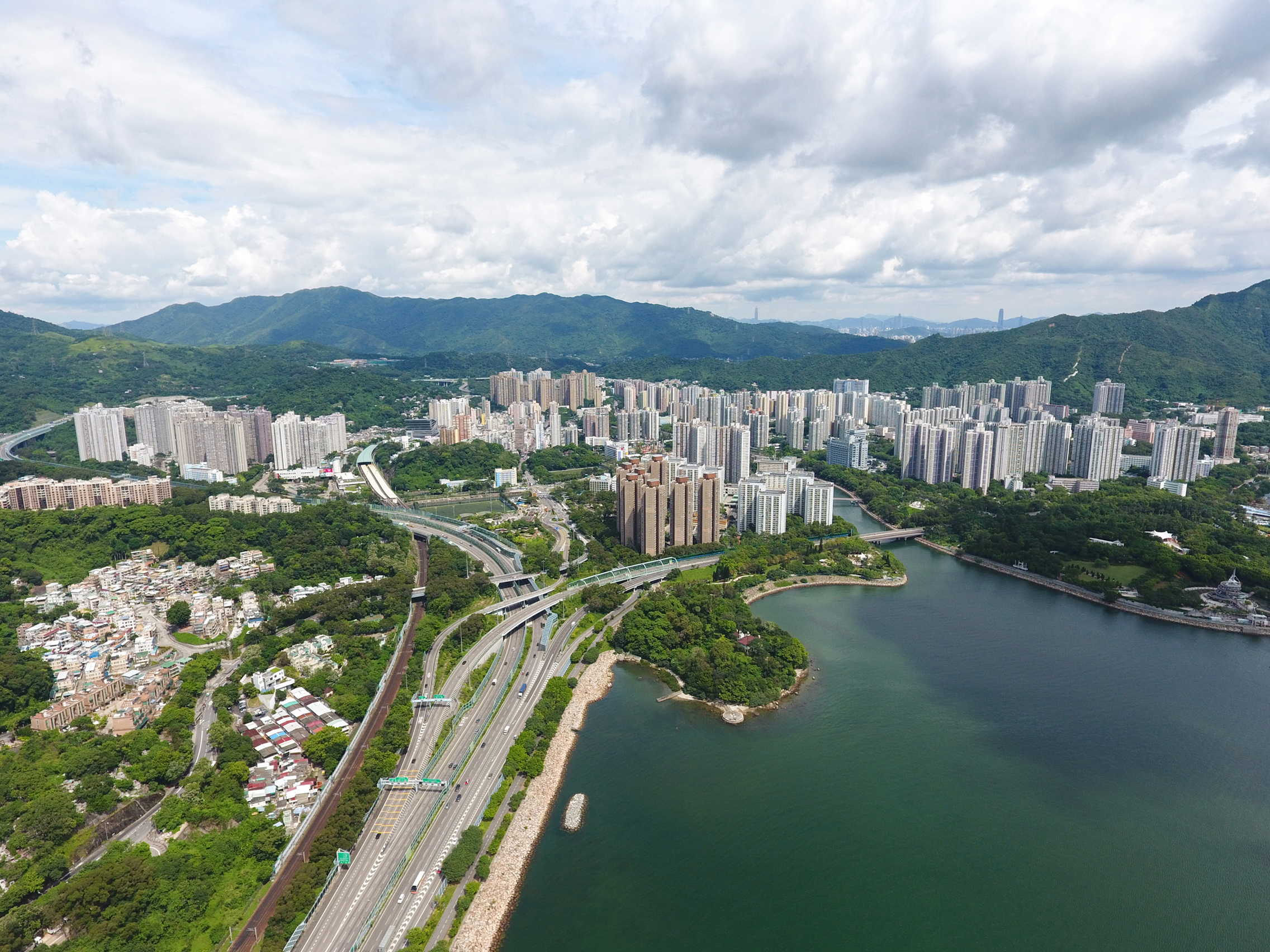
- Day view of Tai Po in the Tai Po District (2017)

- Location of Tai Po District within Hong Kong
- Coordinates: 22°27′03″N 114°09′51″E
- Country: Hong Kong
- Region: New Territories
- Constituencies: 19

Government
  - District Council Chairman: Mo Ka-Chun
  - District Council Vice-Chairman: vacant
  - District Officer: Eunice Chan

Area
  - Total: 148.05 km^{2} (57.16 sq mi)

Population (2021)
  - Total: 316,470
  - Density: 2,137.6/km^{2} (5,536.3/sq mi)
- Time zone: UTC+8 (Hong Kong Time)
- Website: Webpage of the Tai Po District Office

Tai Po District
- Traditional Chinese: 大埔區
- Simplified Chinese: 大埔区
- Cantonese Yale: Daaih-bou Kēui
Transcriptions
Standard Mandarin
- Hanyu Pinyin: Dàpǔ Qū
- Gwoyeu Romatzyh: Dahpuu Chiu
Hakka
- Romanization: Tai^{4} Bu^{4} Ki^{1}
Yue: Cantonese
- Yale Romanization: Daaih-bou Kēui
- Jyutping: Daai6bou3 Keoi1
- IPA: [taj˨.pɔw˧ kʰɵɥ˥]

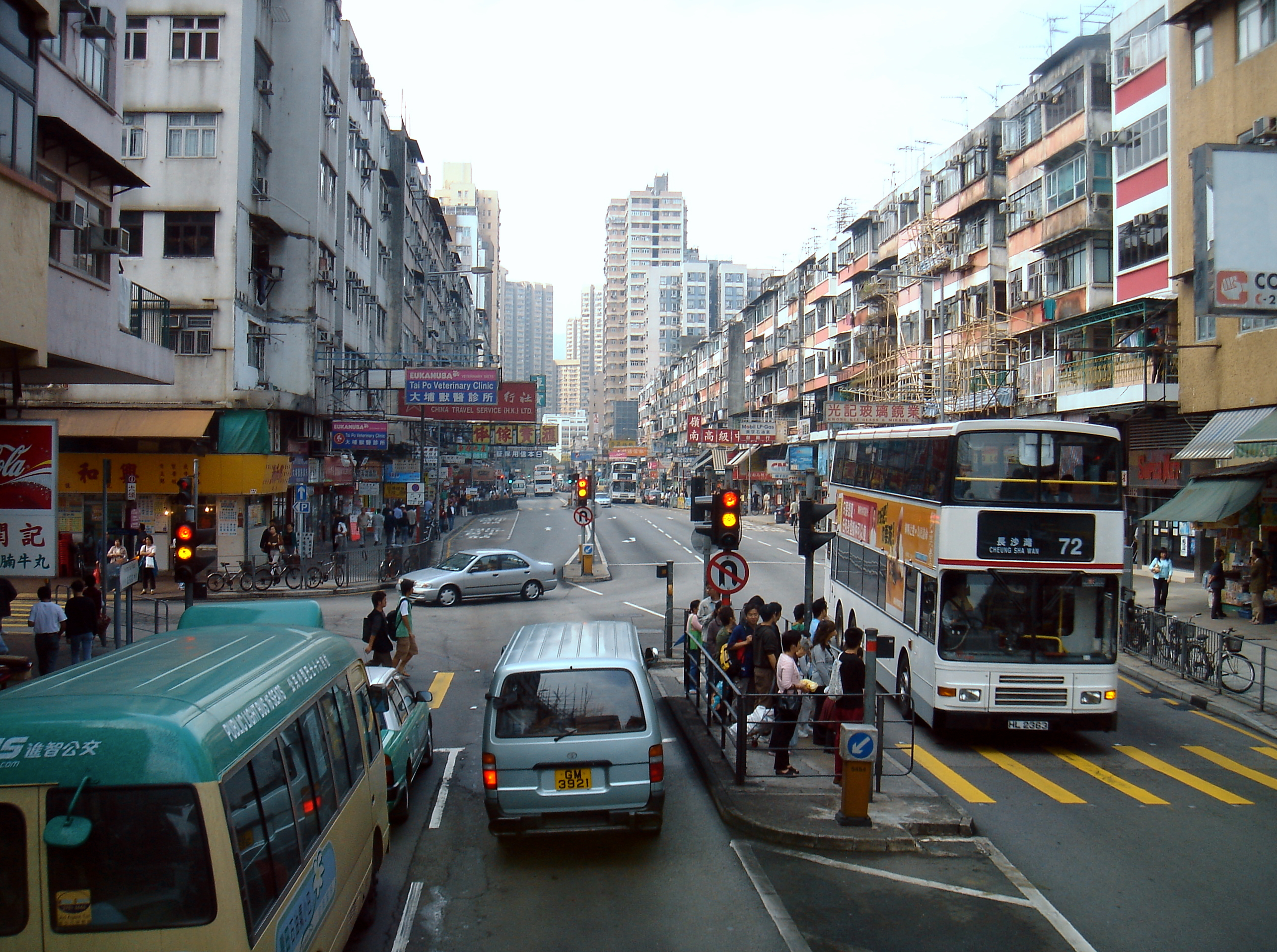
Junction of Kwong Fuk Road and Wan Tau Street, Tai Po

Tai Po District is one of the 18 districts of Hong Kong. It is located in the New Territories. The suburban district covers the areas of Tai Po New Town (including areas such as Tai Po Market, Tai Po Old Market, Tai Po Industrial Estate, Tai Wo Estate), Tai Po Tau, Tai Po Kau, Hong Lok Yuen, Ting Kok, Plover Cove, Lam Tsuen Valley, Tai Mei Tuk and other surrounding areas, and its exclaves Sai Kung North, in the northern part of the Sai Kung Peninsula and including islands such as Grass Island (Tap Mun), and Ping Chau (Tung Ping Chau). Tai Po proper and Sai Kung North are divided by the Tolo Channel and the Tolo Harbour (Tai Po Hoi). The district is located in the Eastern New Territories. The de facto administrative centre of the district is Tai Po New Town.

Like Yuen Long, the area of Tai Po used to be a traditional market town. Tai Po New Town, a satellite town, developed around the area of Tai Po and on reclaimed land on the estuaries of Lam Tsuen and Tai Po rivers.

== History ==
The district(Tai Po) is named after Tai Po. Tai Po's population dates back to the eleventh century, people would make sufficient money by clamming, pearl harvesting, and fishing. In Yuen Chau Tsai, stone axe and pottery have been discovered which were believed to be made in Neolithic era.

Tai Po was the seat of the district officers that oversaw the whole of the New Territories with Island House as their official residence. The Island House was completed in 1906, 8 years after the Convention for the Extension of Hong Kong Territory. The New Territories was later split into the District North and South (Not to be confused with modern-day Northern District and Southern District of Hong Kong), as well as New Kowloon in 1937. Tai Po remained as the headquarters of the District North after the split. The old headquarters of the District is a declared monument currently. The District North and then further shrunk, which Sha Tin District, Yuen Long District (includes modern-day Tuen Mun) and the modern-day Northern District were split from the District North and District North was renamed Tai Po District, which oversaw Tai Po and nearby Lam Tsuen Valley, as well as an exclave on the northern part of the Sai Kung Peninsula. The seats of the Tai Po District branch of the Home Affairs Department as well as the Tai Po District Officer, are currently located in another government building, Tai Po Government Offices Building, in Ting Kok Road, in the northern shore of Lam Tsuen River.

The Tai Po District Council was formed as the Tai Po District Board in the 1980s, with elections held since that decade.

On November 26, 2025, a large five-alarm fire broke out at Wang Fuk Court, which has displaced at least 4500 people, including 1450 in hostels, killing 168 people, including a firefighter. The people who lived at Wang Fuk Court are displaced to temporary shelters and residential areas, including one at Kai Tak youth hostel near Kai Tak Harbour. The Government has also provided a $100,000 living allowance from the Support Fund to each affected household, while families of each deceased victim are provided with a token of solidarity of $200,000, as well as $50,000 to cover funeral costs. All verified cases have been processed so far.

== Geography ==
Lam Tsuen River Tai Po is located in the north of Hong Kong, northeast of Sha Tin. Even though the Tai Po Industrial Estate is located in the district, it is still one of the most unpolluted districts in Hong Kong. Tai Po's population density is considerably lower than Kowloon's, having many old, small villages in the mountains.

Tai Po is surrounded by fertile valleys which explains why it has held such a population for over a millennium. Tai Po is covered with bicycle tracks, east of Lam Tsuen Valley and west of Tolo Harbour. East Rail line is the main connection of Tai Po to the rest of Hong Kong.

Tai Po has 460 hectares of purely woodland area, the largest in Hong Kong.

=== Islands ===
In addition to the mainland part of the district, the following islands of Hong Kong are under the jurisdiction of Tai Po District:

- A Chau (丫洲, Centre Island)
- Breaker Reef – Tai Po
- Bun Sha Pai (崩紗排)
- Cham Pai (杉排)
- Chau Tsai Kok (洲仔角)
- Che Lei Pai (扯里排)
- Chek Chau (赤洲, Port Island)
- Flat Island (銀洲)
- Hau Tsz Kok Pai (孝子角排)
- Hin Pai (蜆排)
- Kung Chau (弓洲)
- Ma Shi Chau (馬屎洲)
- Ma Yan Pai (媽印排)
- Mo Chau (磨洲)
- Ping Chau (平洲)
- Sam Pui Chau (三杯酒)
- Sha Pai (沙排)
- Shek Ngau Chau (石牛洲)
- Tang Chau (燈洲)
- Tap Mun Chau (塔門洲, Grass Island)
- Tit Shue Pai (鐵樹排)
- Wai Chau Pai (灣仔排)
- Wu Chau (烏洲)
- Yeung Chau (洋洲)

=== Climate ===
Climate data for Tai Po (2000–2020)
Month	Jan	Feb	Mar	Apr	May	Jun	Jul	Aug	Sep	Oct	Nov	Dec	Year
Record high °C (°F)	26.1 (79.0)	29.3 (84.7)	30.4 (86.7)	32.4 (90.3)	34.7 (94.5)	35.8 (96.4)	37.0 (98.6)	36.5 (97.7)	35.9 (96.6)	33.2 (91.8)	30.8 (87.4)	27.5 (81.5)	37.0 (98.6)
Mean daily maximum °C (°F)	18.4 (65.1)	19.4 (66.9)	21.6 (70.9)	25.3 (77.5)	28.5 (83.3)	30.6 (87.1)	31.6 (88.9)	31.4 (88.5)	30.2 (86.4)	27.8 (82.0)	24.3 (75.7)	20.2 (68.4)	25.8 (78.4)
Daily mean °C (°F)	15.5 (59.9)	16.6 (61.9)	19.0 (66.2)	22.6 (72.7)	26.0 (78.8)	28.0 (82.4)	28.7 (83.7)	28.4 (83.1)	27.6 (81.7)	25.2 (77.4)	21.5 (70.7)	17.1 (62.8)	23.0 (73.4)
Mean daily minimum °C (°F)	12.9 (55.2)	14.3 (57.7)	16.8 (62.2)	20.4 (68.7)	23.9 (75.0)	25.9 (78.6)	26.3 (79.3)	26.0 (78.8)	25.3 (77.5)	22.9 (73.2)	18.9 (66.0)	14.2 (57.6)	20.7 (69.2)
Record low °C (°F)	2.8 (37.0)	4.4 (39.9)	7.1 (44.8)	11.5 (52.7)	15.5 (59.9)	19.7 (67.5)	23.0 (73.4)	23.1 (73.6)	19.9 (67.8)	13.8 (56.8)	7.8 (46.0)	3.7 (38.7)	2.8 (37.0)
Average precipitation mm (inches)	14.2 (0.56)	43.9 (1.73)	32.6 (1.28)	69.7 (2.74)	163.7 (6.44)	321.7 (12.67)	485.0 (19.09)	379.0 (14.92)	386.8 (15.23)	289.6 (11.40)	109.7 (4.32)	40.8 (1.61)	2,336.7 (91.99)
Average rainy days	4.1	7.0	8.9	11.0	14.3	16.9	15.9	14.5	10.8	5.4	4.8	4.2	117.8
Average relative humidity (%)	32.4	79.5	81.2	82.3	83.3	82.8	81.4	82.6	79.0	73.6	74.2	69.9	75.2
Source: Hong Kong Observatory (precipitation 1992–2020, rainy days 2000–2017)

== Housing ==
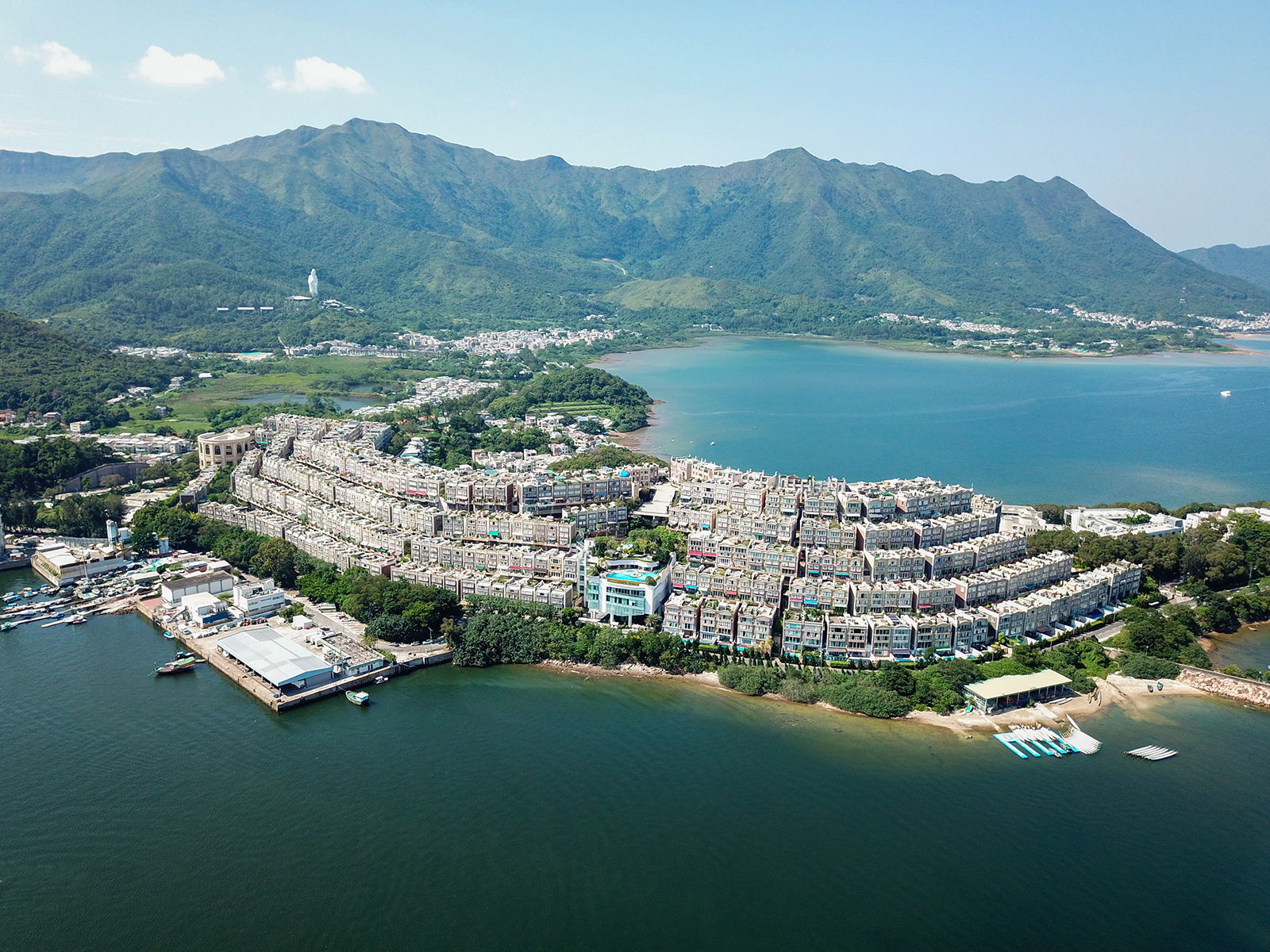
The Beverly Hills, with the Pat Sin Leng range in the background.

Because Hong Kong is in a very densely populated region, Tai Po Town has copied the many urban areas of Hong Kong by building high-rise apartments. 320,000 people have residences in the town, making high-rise apartments necessary and mandatory. These high-rise apartments are located inside estates, such as Tai Yuen Estates and Fu Heng Estates. These high-rise apartments have floors ranging from the low apartments in Tai Po Old Town to the new estates in northern Tai Po ranging from 20 to 34 levels. The area is serviced by the Tai Po Hui Market, Built in 2004.

The Tai Po area also has many "village houses", resulting from a 1972 Hong Kong legislation which gave any male heir over the age of 18 who could prove he was descended from one of Hong Kong's original villages in 1898 the right to build a small house on a plot of land, either owned by the village itself or on leased government land. These houses are restricted by law to be no more than three stories and 27 feet (8.2 m) in height, and no more than 2,100 square feet (200 m^{2}) in total floor space.

There are also a few private housing developments in the Tai Po area with "detached" and "semi-detached" houses which include communal recreational areas such as swimming pools, tennis courts, and children's playgrounds, and entertainment facilities such as private cinemas, health spas and karaoke rooms. These developments are excluded from the "village house" law, and therefore units are often much larger than 2,100 square feet (200 m^{2}).

Privately owned residential housing in Tai Po included Tai Po Centre, Plover Cove Garden, Uptown Plaza, The Beverly Hills, and many other residential estates.

== Transportation ==
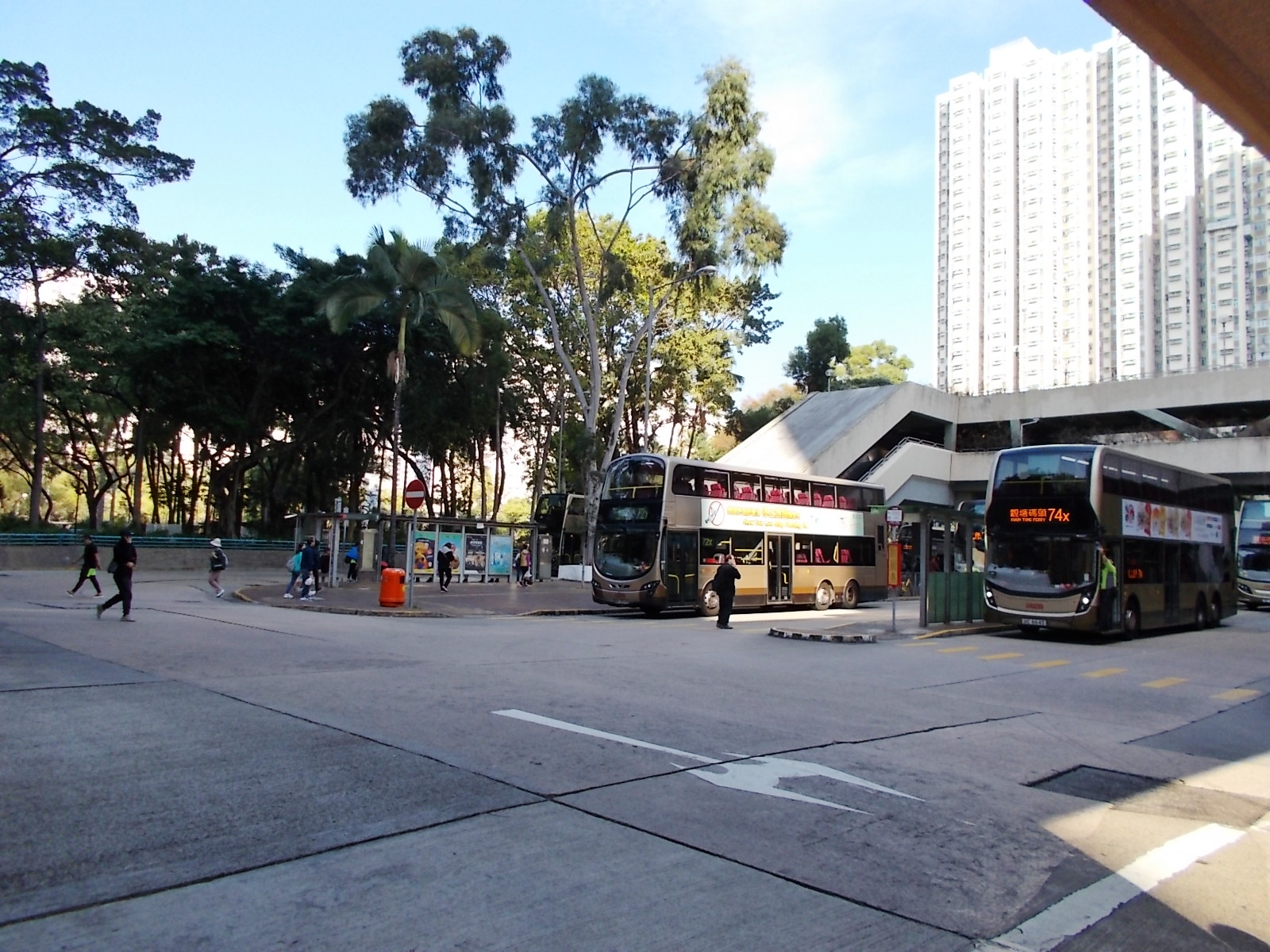
Tai Po Central Bus Terminus

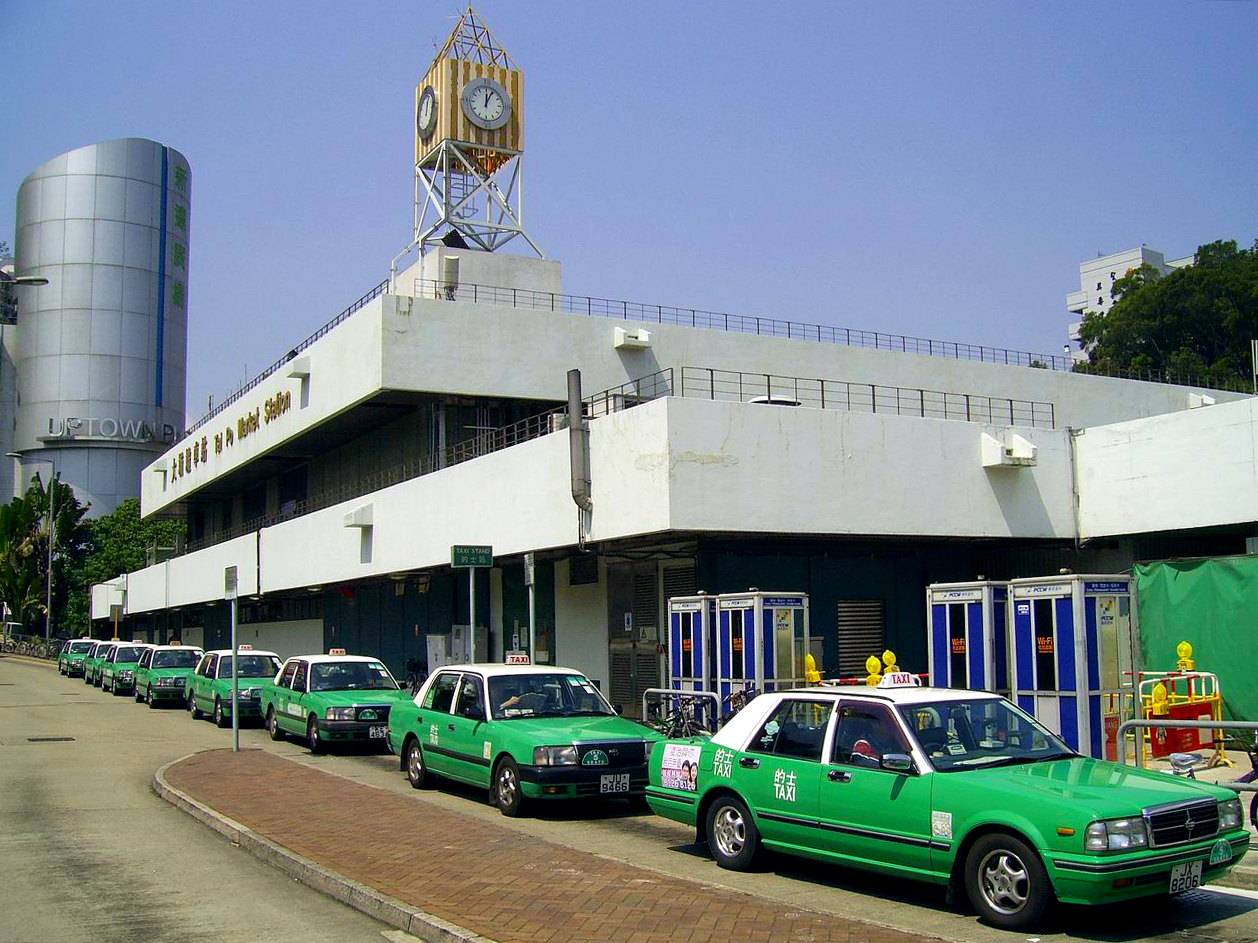
Tai Po Market station in 2008

=== Buses ===
Transportation in Tai Po Town is much like any other place in Hong Kong. Due to the high population, Hong Kong has double-decker buses. Due to the road layout of Tai Po New Town, most bus services run via Kwong Fuk Estate. Some buses lead to the rest of Hong Kong such as the KMB bus route 271 that goes from Fu Heng Estate in Tai Po Town to West Kowloon Station in Tsim Sha Tsui and bus route 307 which goes from Central Tai Po Town towards the Central Ferry Piers via Central and Wan Chai of Victoria. Some buses lead directly to the airport such as A47X from Tai Po (Tai Wo) to Hong Kong Airport and E41 from Tai Po Centre (Tai Po Plaza and Tai Po Mega Mall) to Hong Kong International Airport within 90 minutes.

=== Railway ===
Two railway stations along the East Rail line serve Tai Po, namely: Tai Po Market station (in the older district) and Tai Wo station (serving newer estates). Trains originate at the Hong Kong-Chinese border, at either Lo Wu or Lok Ma Chau stations, and travel south to Admiralty station in Hong Kong Island, passing through Tai Po on the way.

The railway, previously known as the KCR British Section, opened in 1910. The old Tai Po Market station opened on that date and was closed in 1983 when the modern station of the same name opened as part of an upgrading of the line by the Kowloon-Canton Railway Corporation. Tai Wo station opened in 1989. In 2007 the line was leased for 50 years to the MTR Corporation.

Tai Po Kau station served the Tai Po Kau area between 1910 and 1983. It has since been demolished.

== Education ==
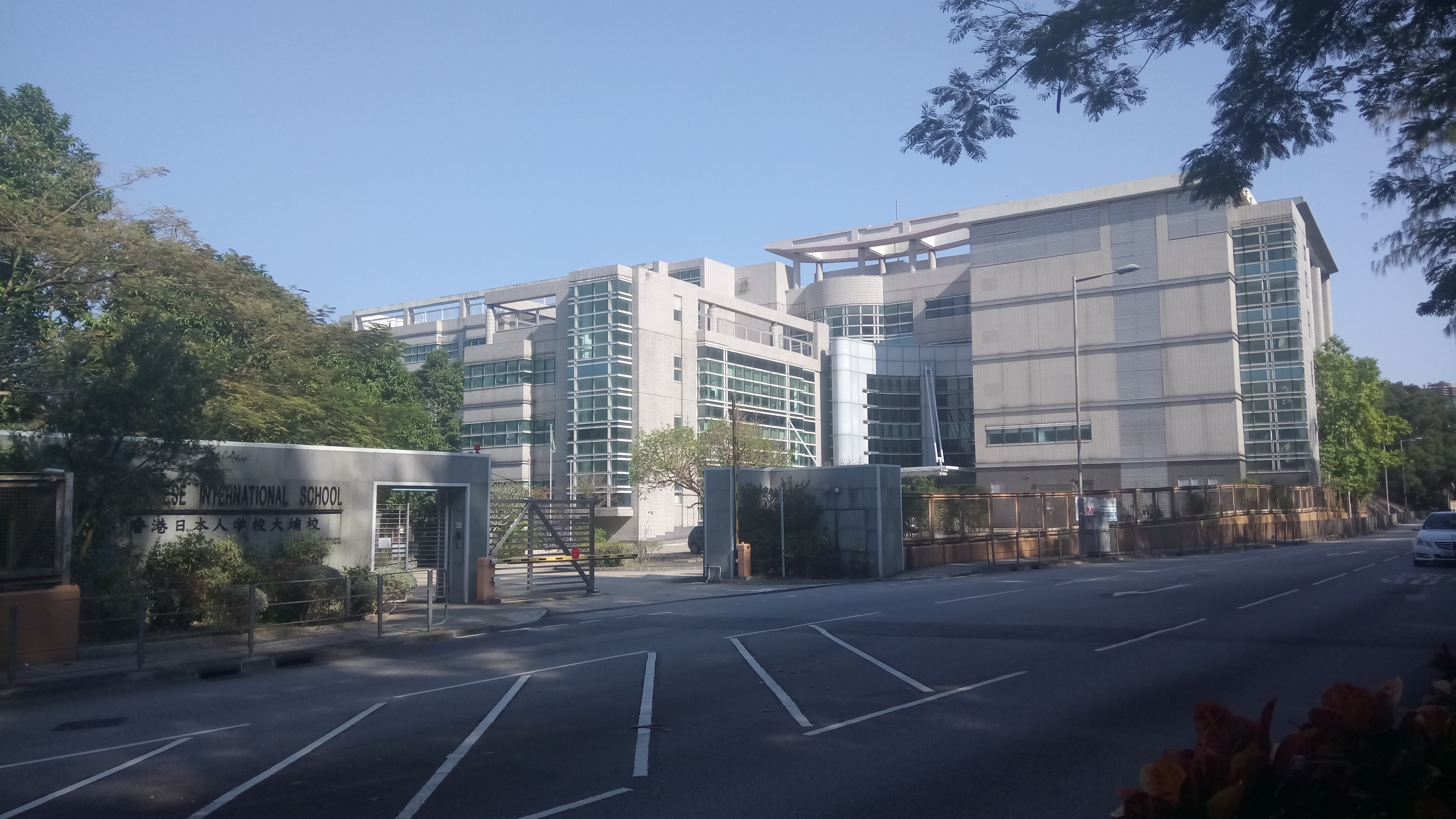
Hong Kong Japanese School Tai Po Campus

Tai Po District is roughly divided into two primary school districts. The 84 school district for Tai Po New Town and surrounding villages, while Sai Kung North belongs to the 95 school district; the Sai Kung District also belongs to the 95 school district.

As of 2018, there were 19 secondary schools in the whole Tai Po District, all located in the Tai Po New Town. The secondary school district of Tai Po District was designated "NET NT6".

Several international schools are located in the Tai Po District. They do not belong to any school district. The Tai Po campus of Hong Kong Japanese School's International Section was opened in 1997. American School Hong Kong was scheduled to open in Tai Po in 2016. Norwegian International School occupied a building formerly known as The Tai Po Bungalow as a campus.

Li Po Chun United World College, located in Ma On Shan of the Sha Tin district, is near the border of the Sai Kung North exclave of the Tai Po district.

The campus of the Education University of Hong Kong, formerly the Hong Kong Institute of Education (HKIED), is located in the Tai Po District since 1997. The institute gained university status in 2016. The campus is located just north of Tai Po Industrial Estate. It is the only university in the district.

The Chinese University of Hong Kong is located on the border between Tai Po and Sha Tin districts.

Hong Kong Public Libraries operates Tai Po Public Library in the district.

== Sports ==
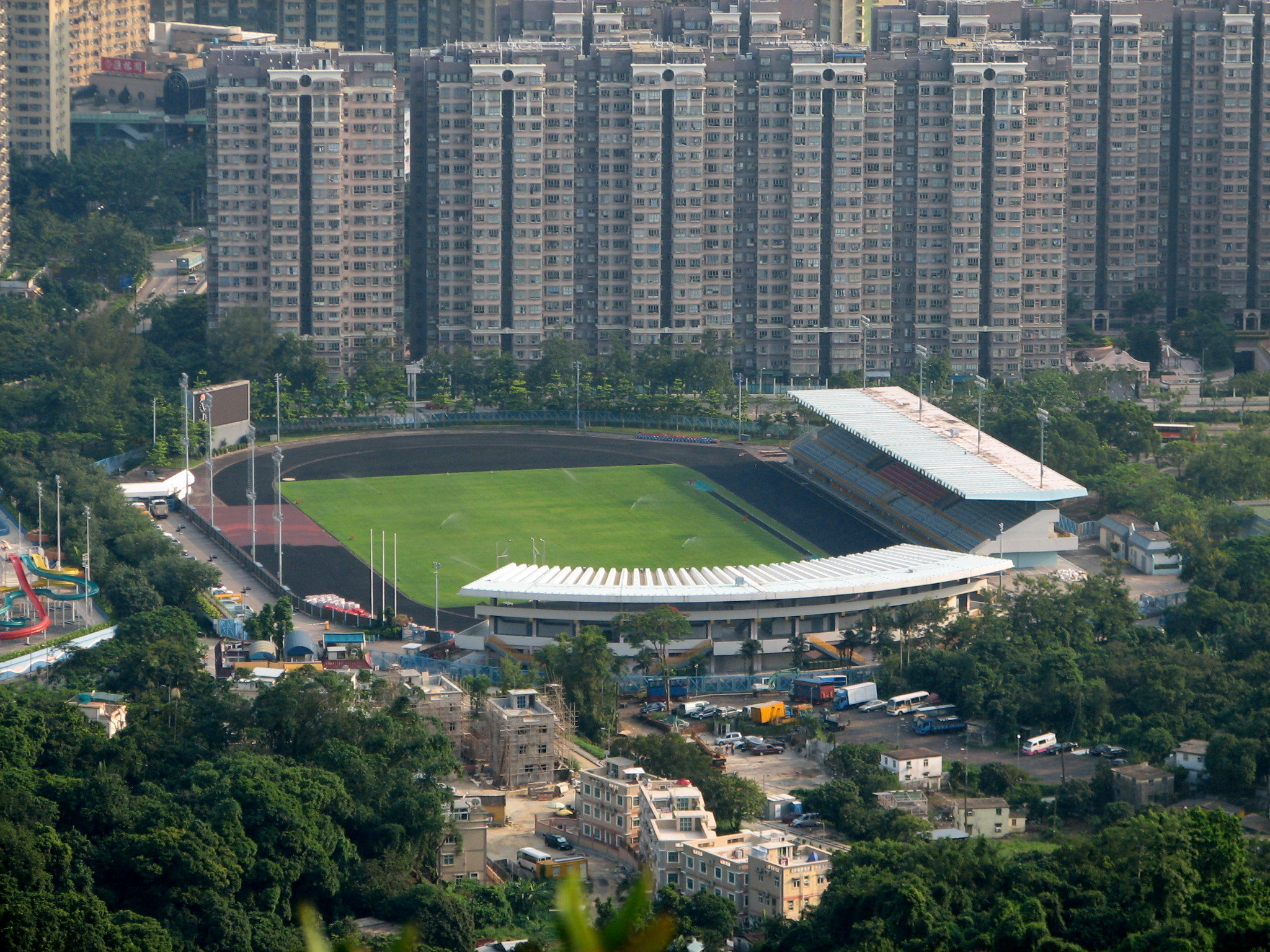
Tai Po Sports Ground

- Tai Po Sports Ground, an outdoor track and field ground, owned by the government and operated by the Leisure and Cultural Services Department (LSCD)
- Tai Po Swimming Pool, an outdoor swimming pool next to the sports ground, owned by the government and operated by the LSCD

The government leased a government land to the Tai Po Sports Association in 1988, to run another public swimming pool. The swimming pool, which is also known as the "Jockey Club swimming pool", was closed in 1999. A new swimming pool structure was planned to build. However, the construction was not yet finished, as of 2015.

The district had several sports complexes for the local population, they were owned and operated by the government and located in the Tai Po New Town. Another facility opened in 1983, Li Fook Lam Indoor Sports Centre, was operated by the Tai Po Sports Association Limited, a non-profit making limited company.

=== Football ===
Tai Po FC is the first district football team ever to make it to the Hong Kong First Division League among the 19 district football sides from the Hong Kong Third District Division League. The club plays its home games at Tai Po Sports Ground and has since won the 2008-09 Hong Kong FA Cup.

The district had several football fields (five-a-side, seven-a-side football) for amateur football. In 2016, another football field and sports complex (which includes an indoor swimming pool) would be built.

== Economy ==
Hong Kong Note Printing, which prints all the bank notes in Hong Kong, is located in the Tai Po Industrial Estate, an industrial area of light industries (food processing, printing, etc.)

Hong Kong and China Gas also has its major gas plant in the industrial estate, which supplies most (98%) of the town gas of the city from that plant.

=== Spa Resort Development ===
in 2011, there is a plan to develop a spa hotel resort at Ting Kok, near Tai Mei Tuk. The site will occupy 61,000 sq m and has no more than 230 hotel rooms. Tai Po District councilor Yam Kai-Kong admits the benefits from tourism and job opportunities will be good but he is also concerned about the mangroves and increased traffic in the area.

== Place of interests ==
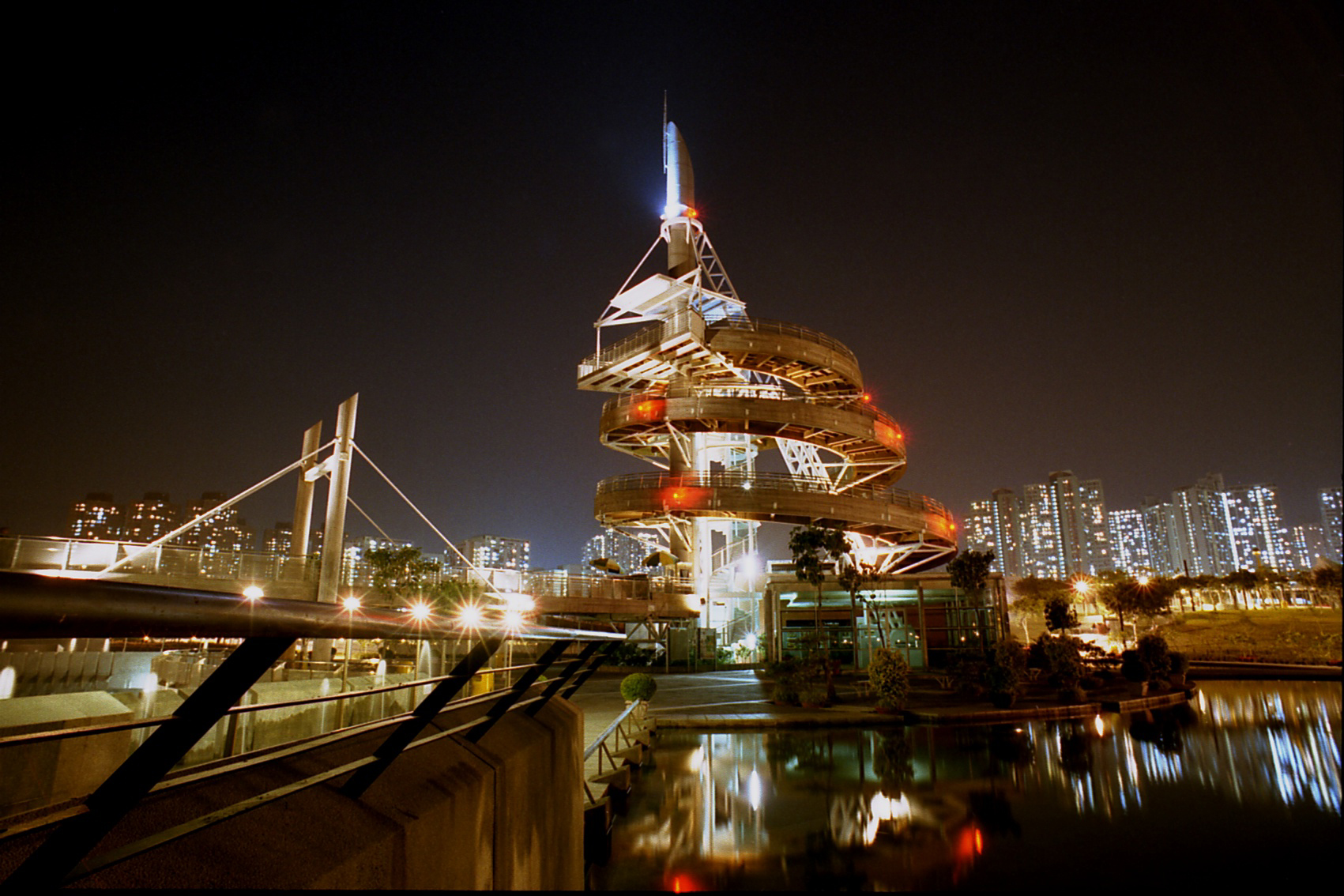
Spiral Lookout Tower at Tai Po Waterfront Park

- The Hong Kong Railway Museum
- Tai Po Waterfront Park
- Tsz Shan Monastery

== Electoral subdivisions ==
The local council of the district, Tai Po District Council, was divided into several subdivisions, known as electoral constituencies. However, the border of those electoral constituencies would under review in each election. It was also accused of gerrymandering for the proposed change of the border for several constituencies in the district for the 2019 election.

In the election of the Legislative Council of Hong Kong, Tai Po District belongs to the cross-district electoral constituency New Territories East.

In the past, Tai Po District belonged to the Regional Council, the middle-tier local government between the city's Legislative Council and the district councils. The Regional Council oversees the New Territories, while its counterpart, Urban Council, oversees Kowloon (including New Kowloon) and the Hong Kong Island. However, they were abolished. The executive function of the Regional Council was a takeover by the Leisure and Cultural Services Department and other government departments.

Before the establishment of the Tai Po District, the area belonged to the District Office North (founded as the District Office which also oversees the area around modern-day Sha Tin), which its headquarter is located in Tai Po; the District Officer was also resided in Tai Po in the Island House on Yuen Chau Tsai.

The election for the village head, as well as councilors of Heung Yee Kuk, has its own electoral constituencies, which are based on the boundary of the villages.

== See also ==
- List of areas of Hong Kong
- Sha Tin District
