= Chau Tsai Kok =

Small uninhabited island in Hong Kong

Coordinates: 22.471682°N 114.357435°E

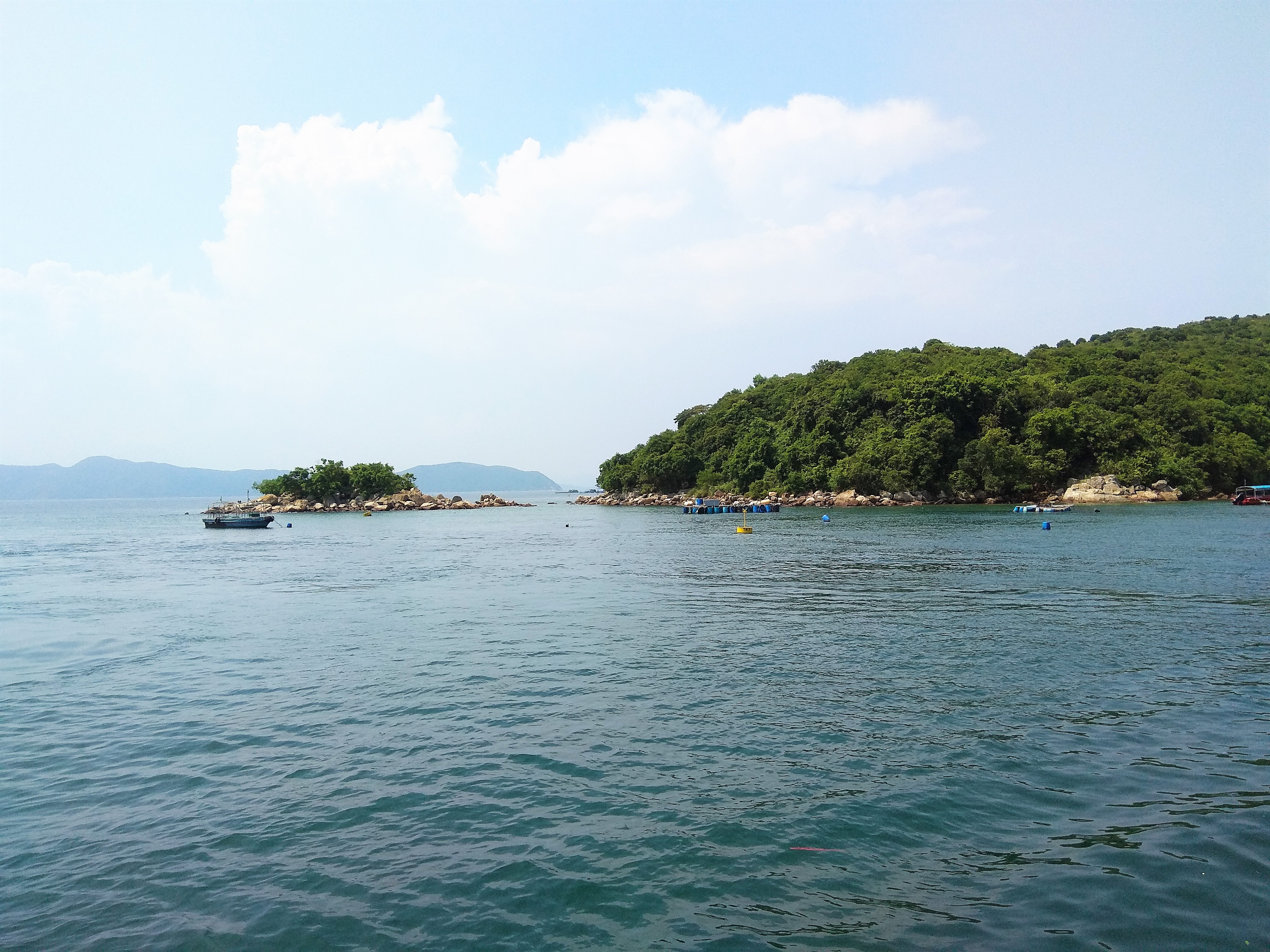
Chau Tsai Kok (left) is an islet off Tap Mun (right)

Chau Tsai Kok (Chinese: 洲仔角) is a small uninhabited islet off the island of Tap Mun in the northeastern New Territories of Hong Kong, opposite to the village of Tap Mun. It is under the administration of Tai Po District.
