= Hau Tsz Kok Pai =

Island of Hong Kong

Coordinates: 22.477952°N 114.355252°E

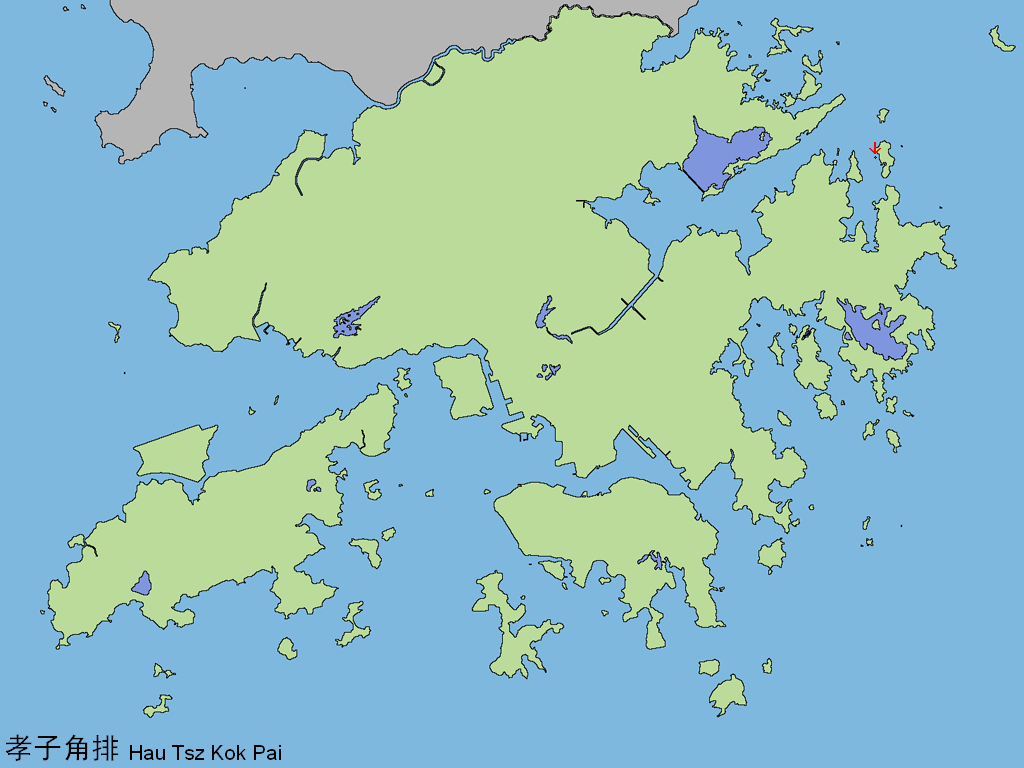
Location of Hau Tsz Kok Pai in Hong Kong

Hau Tsz Kok Pai (Chinese: 孝子角排; lit. 'dutiful son Kok Pai') is a reef of Hong Kong, under the administration of Tai Po District. It is located off the western shore of Tap Mun, in Long Harbour (大灘海), in the north-east of the New Territories.
