= Beverly Hills, Jamaica =

Neighbourhood in Kingston, Jamaica

Coordinates: 18°00′N 76°46′W

Beverly Hills is an upscale neighbourhood in Kingston, Jamaica.

The association can be contacted at: "Beverly Hills - Community Association". Archived from the original on 22 February 2020.
