= Tai Po Waterfront Park =

Public park in Tai Po, Hong Kong

Coordinates: 22.4524°N 114.1883°E

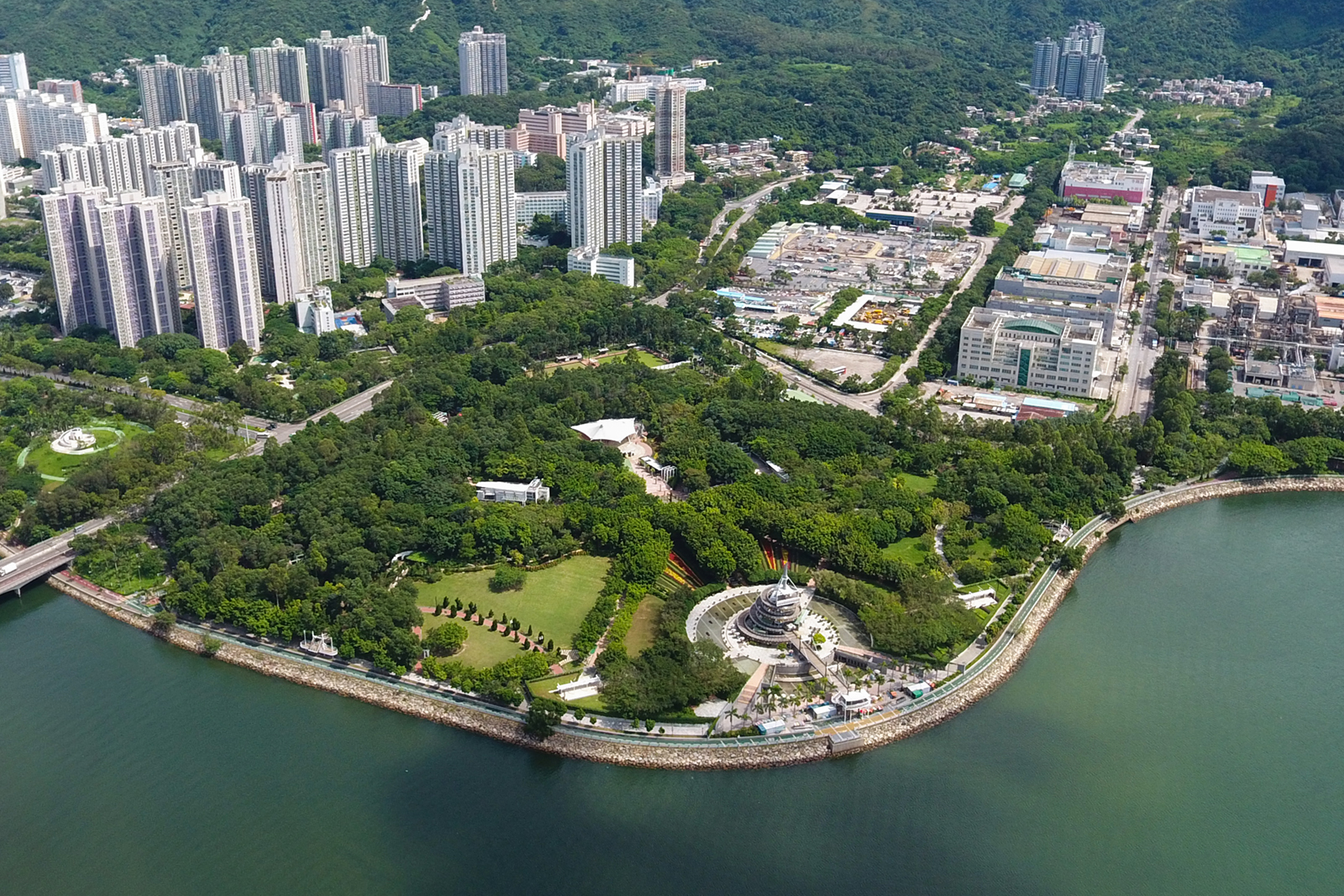
Aerial view Tai Po Waterfront Park

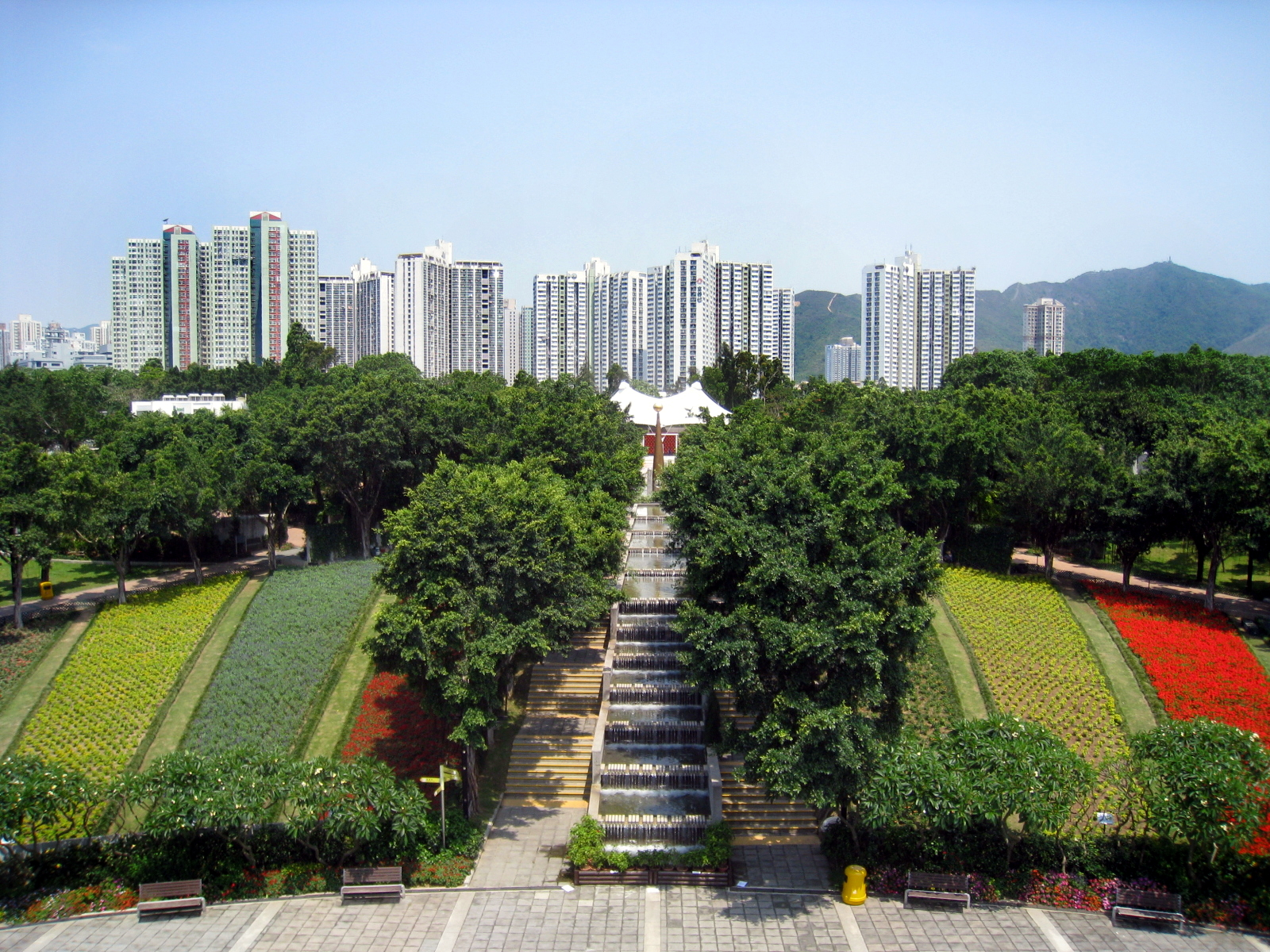
Tai Po Waterfront Park in 2009

Tai Po Waterfront Park (Chinese: 大埔海濱公園) is a park in Tai Po in the New Territories of Hong Kong. It is located along the Tolo Harbour, and its western end is at the northern part of the mouth of the Lam Tsuen River. It occupies an area of 22 hectares (54 acres), and is the largest park managed by the Leisure and Cultural Services Department. The Park opened in 1994 at a cost of $210-million, but was not completed until 1997 with the creation of the Tai Po Lookout Tower.

Every year, the Tai Po Dragon Boat Race is held in the sea off the park.

== Facilities ==
The park has a wide range of public facilities including rest gardens, sitting-out areas, an insect house, a 1.2 kilometres (0.75 mi) promenade along the harbour front, a jogging trail with fitness stations and a 600-seat amphitheatre. The park also has the only dedicated model boat pool in Hong Kong. The park is also the start of the popular cycle route to Tai Mei Tuk. Cycle hires are available in the park.

=== Lookout tower ===
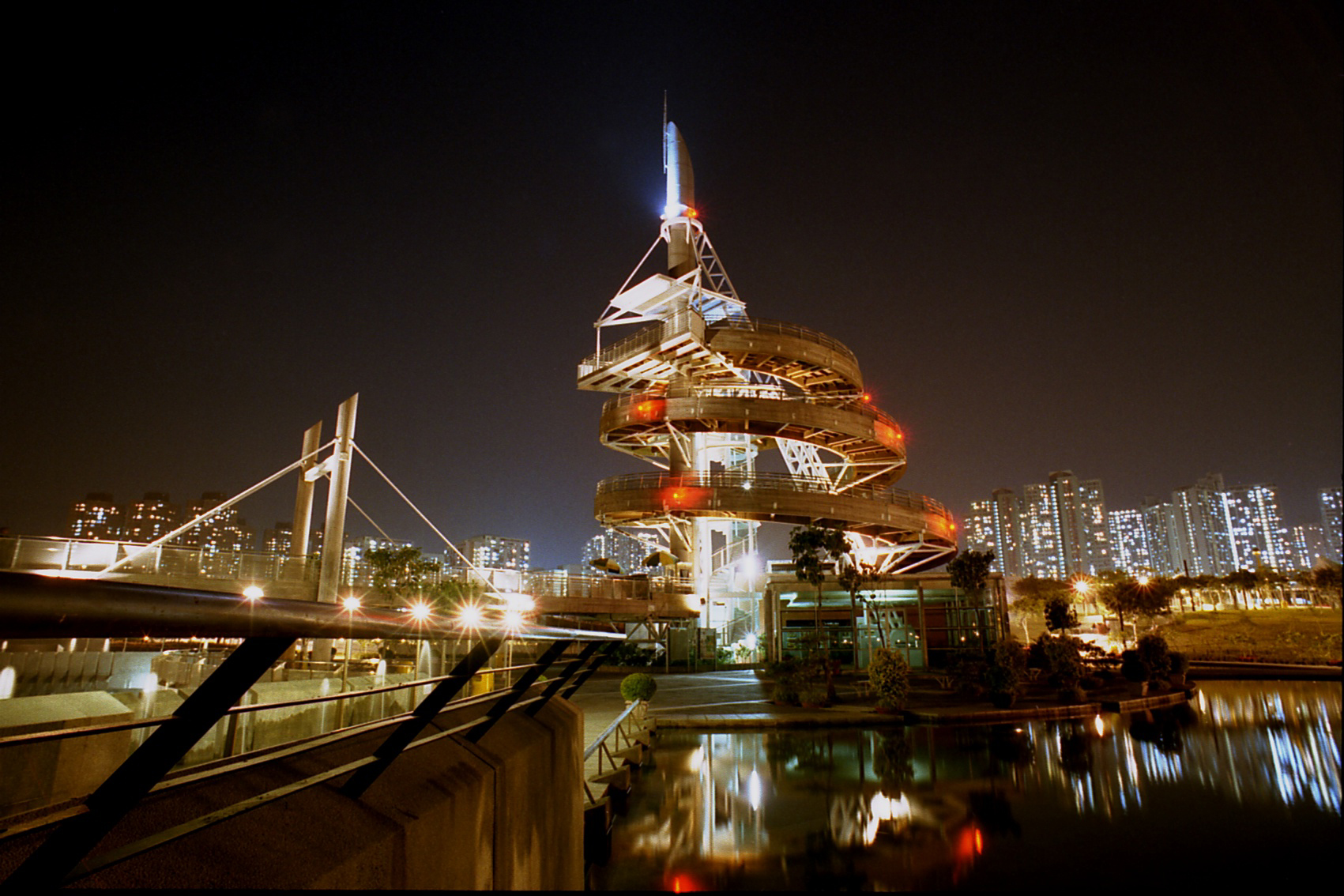
The lookout tower at night

The lookout tower is 32.4 metres (106 ft) high and gives visitors a panoramic view over Tolo Harbour, the Tai Po Industrial Estate and the rugged countryside stretching back to the boundary with mainland China.

The plaques of the lookout tower depict the history of Tai Po, including the struggle with the British army when they originally entered the New Territories, the heroic resistance against the Japanese army during the occupation and prosperity after World War II.

== Gallery ==
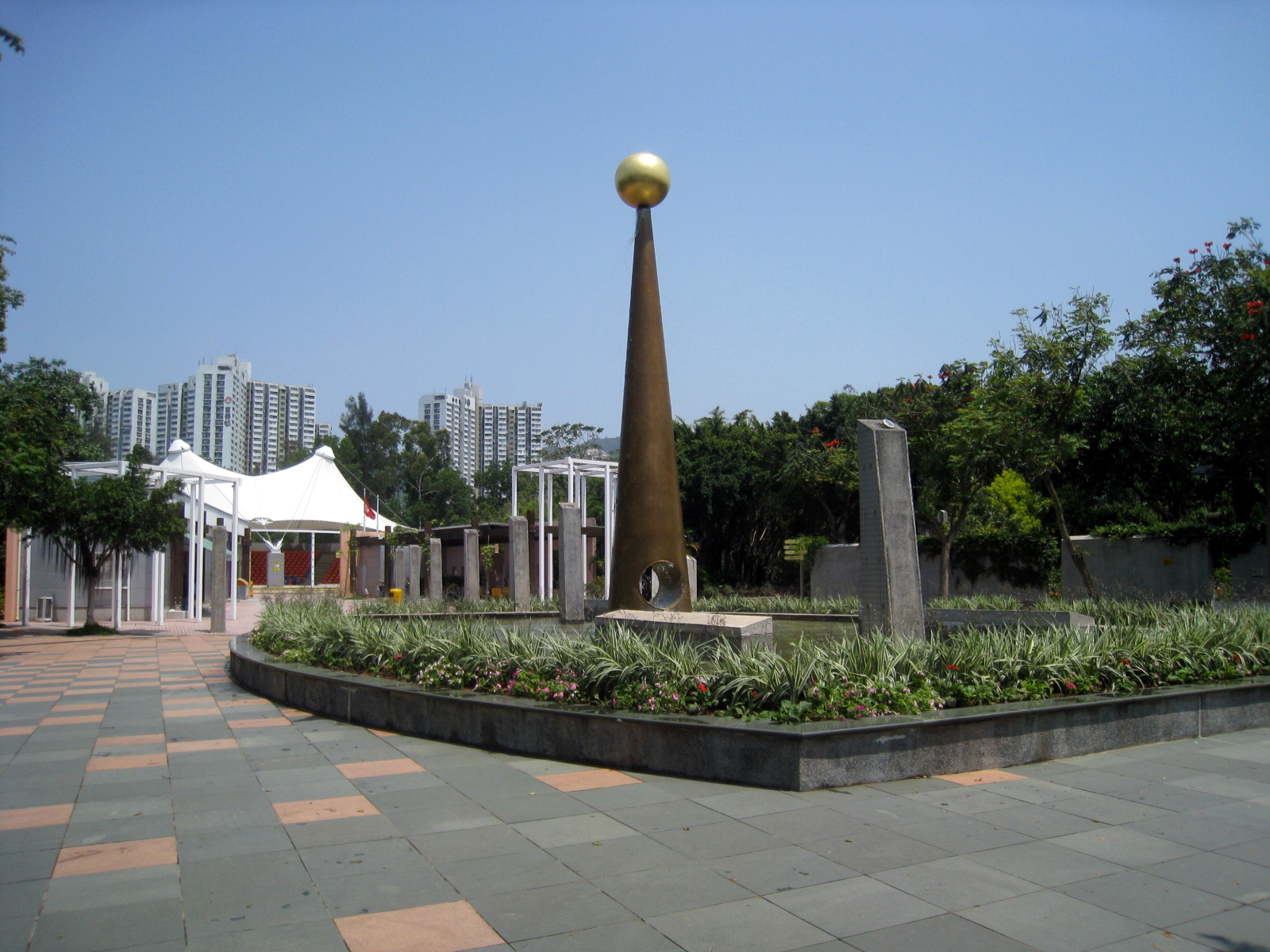
Central water feature

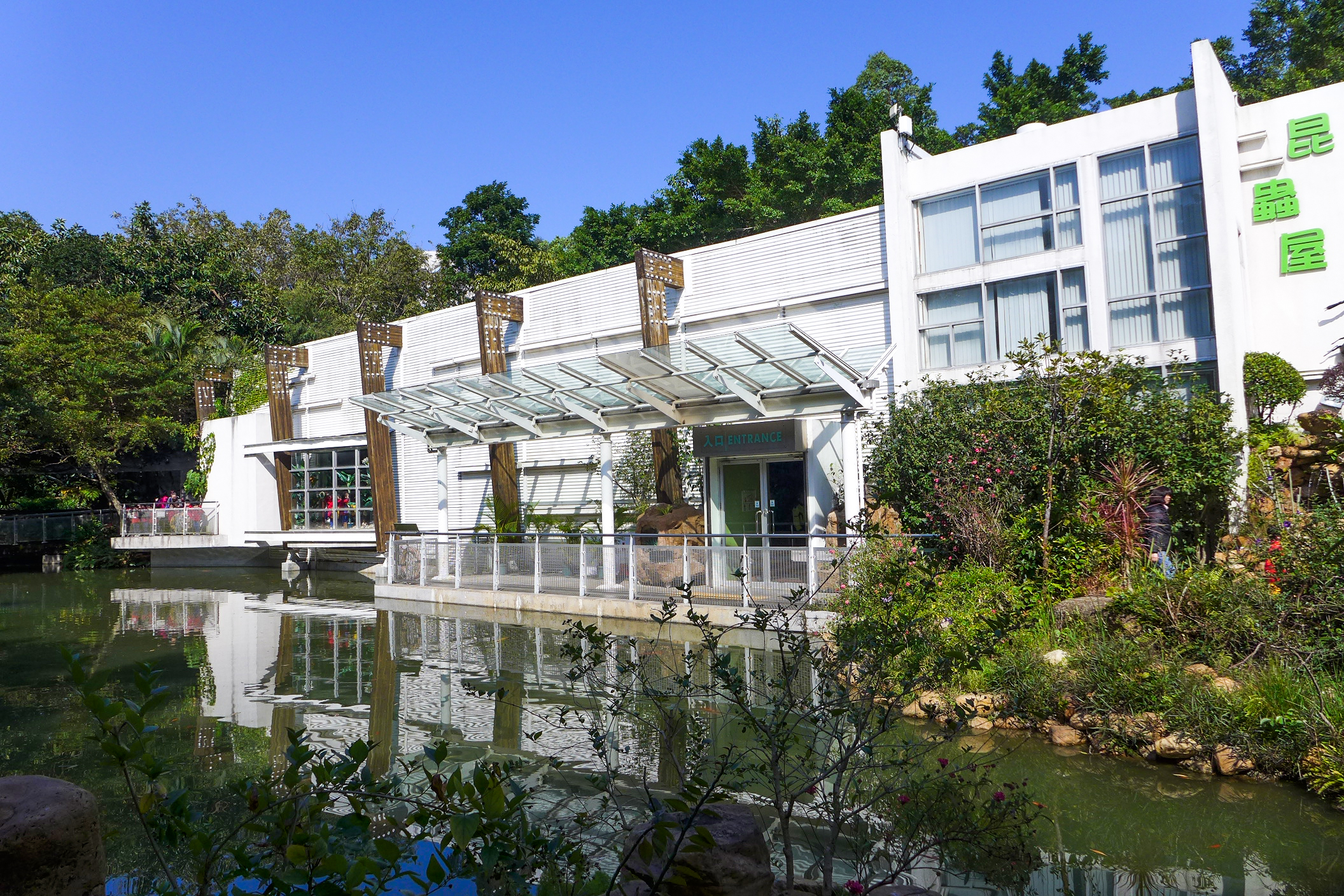
Insect House

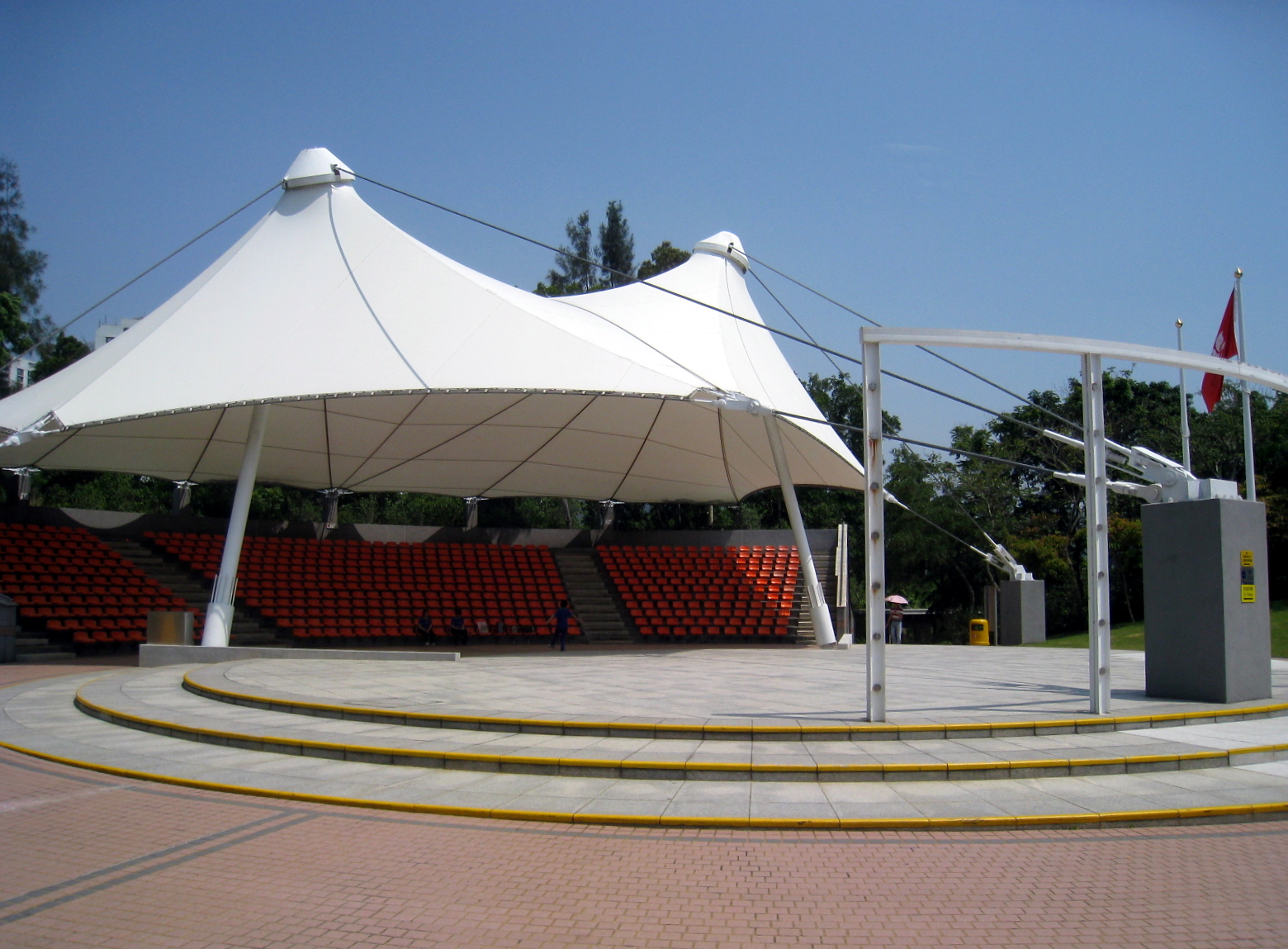
Amphitheatre

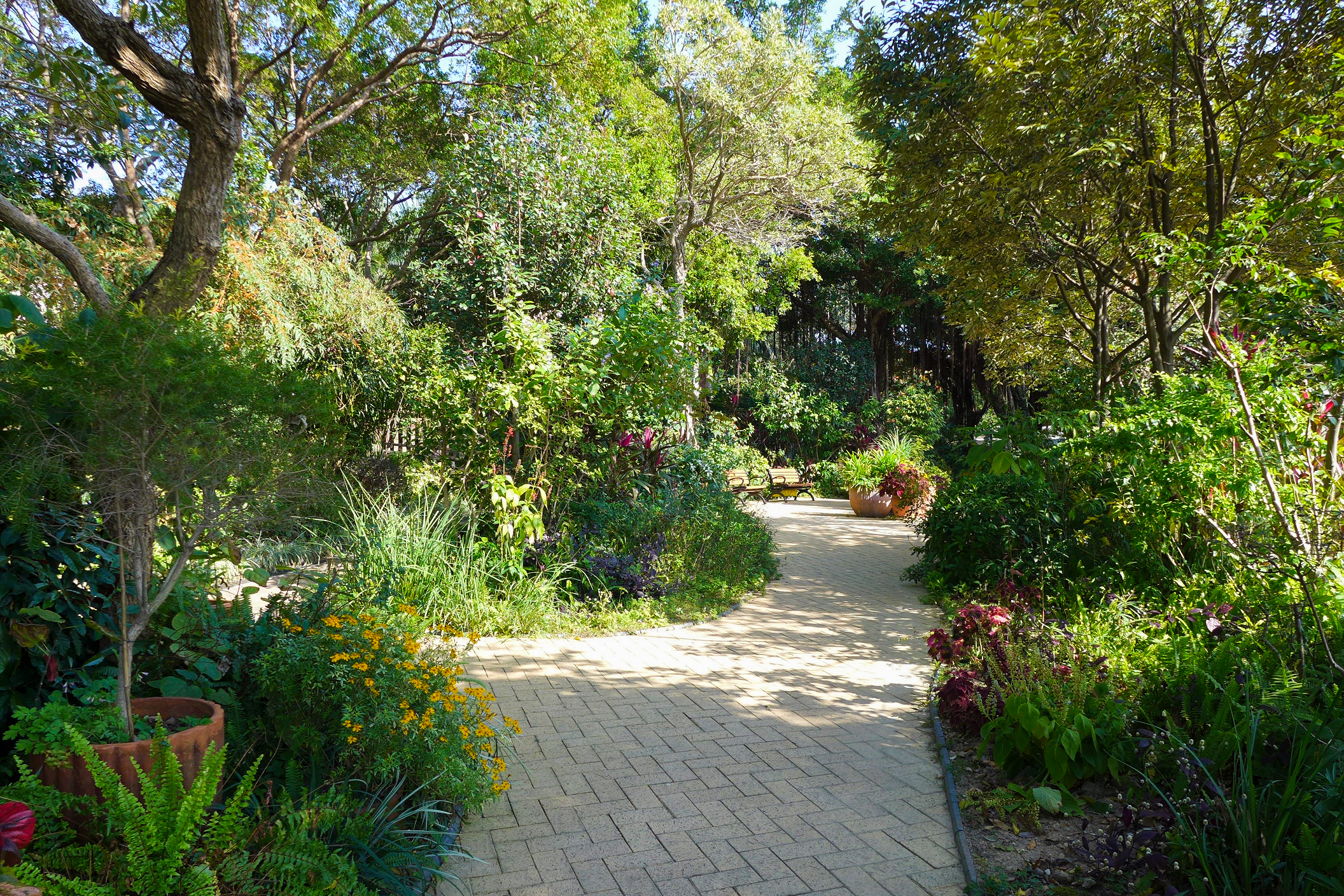
Herbs Garden

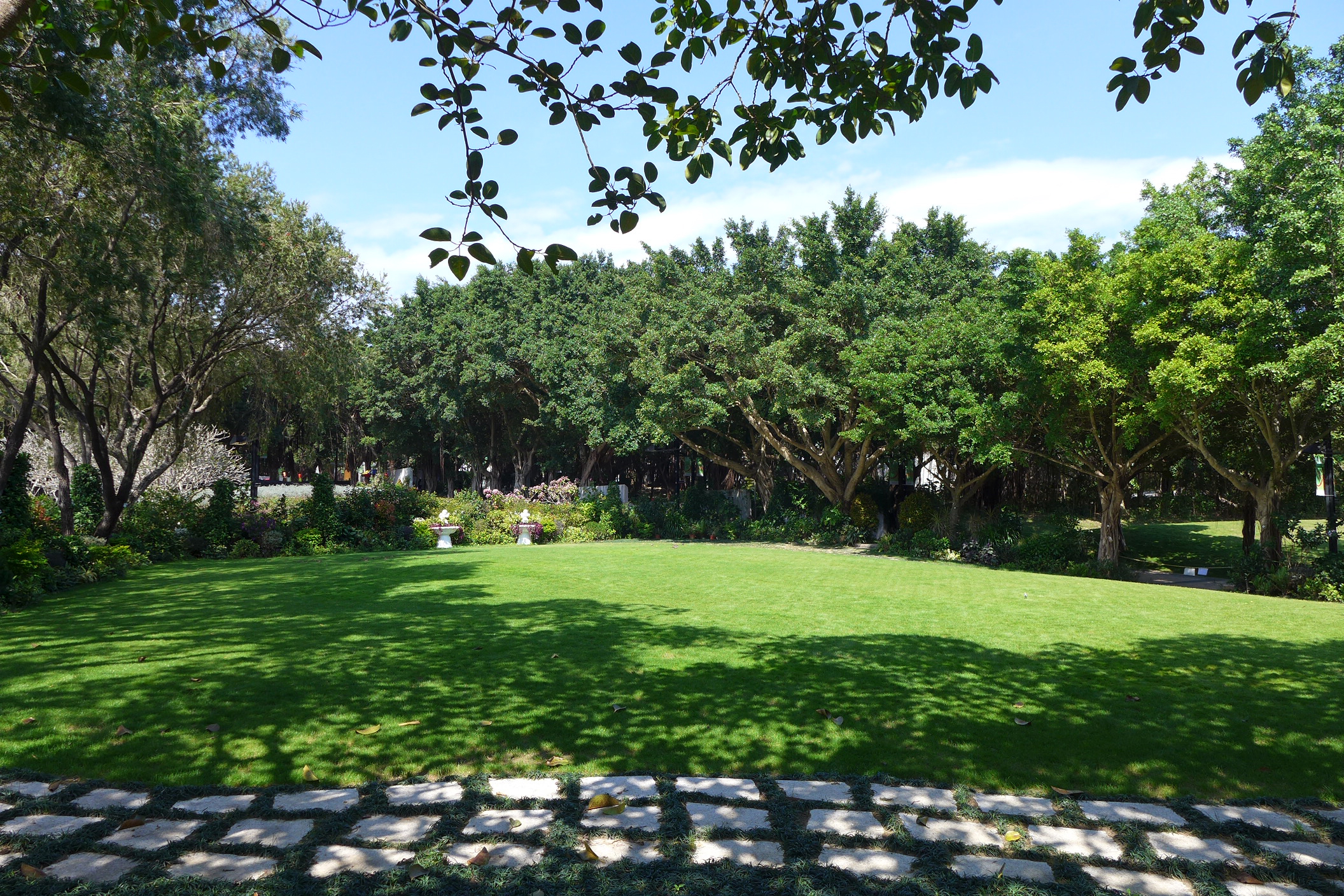
Lawn for Wedding

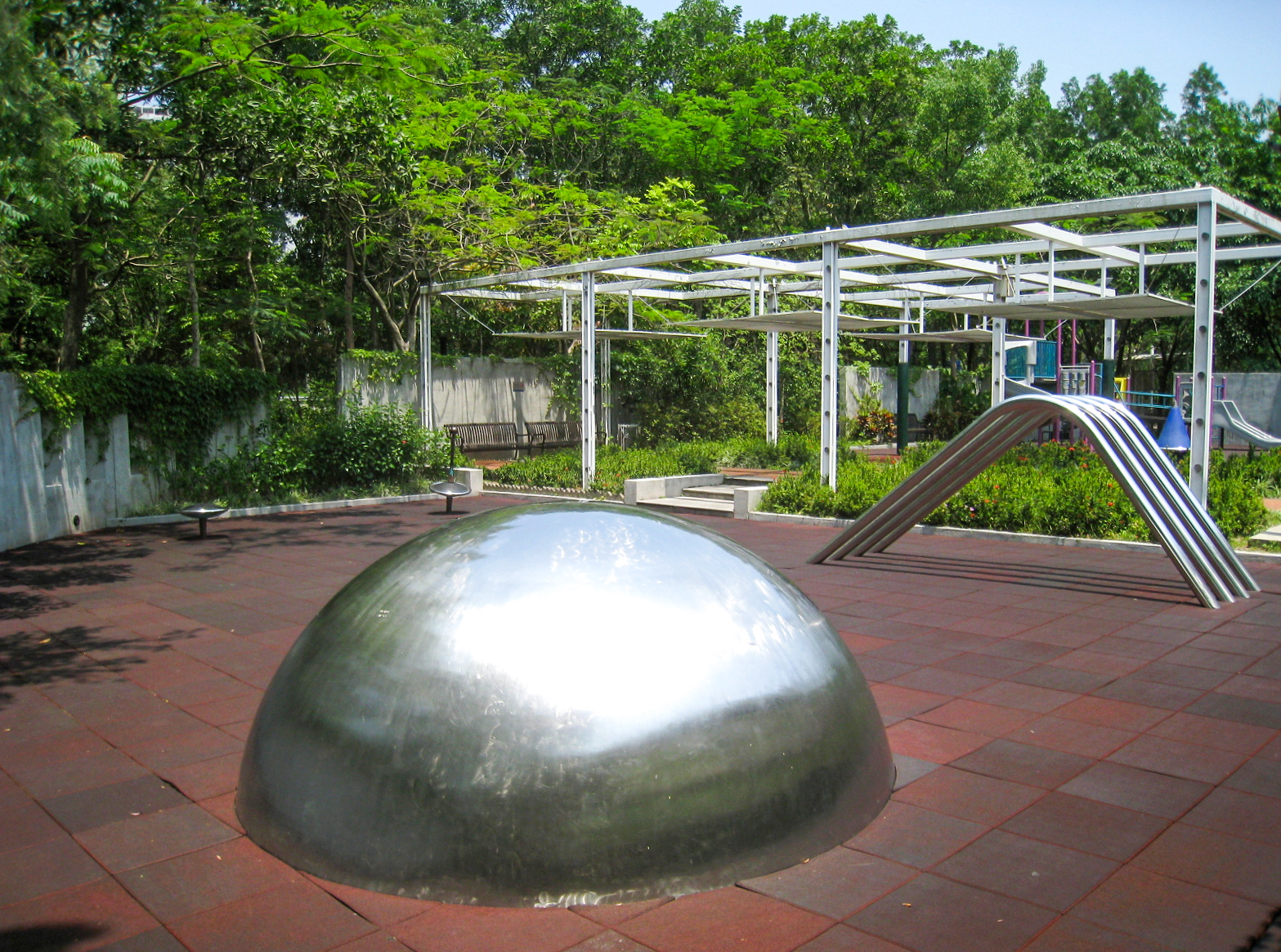
Technology Children Playground

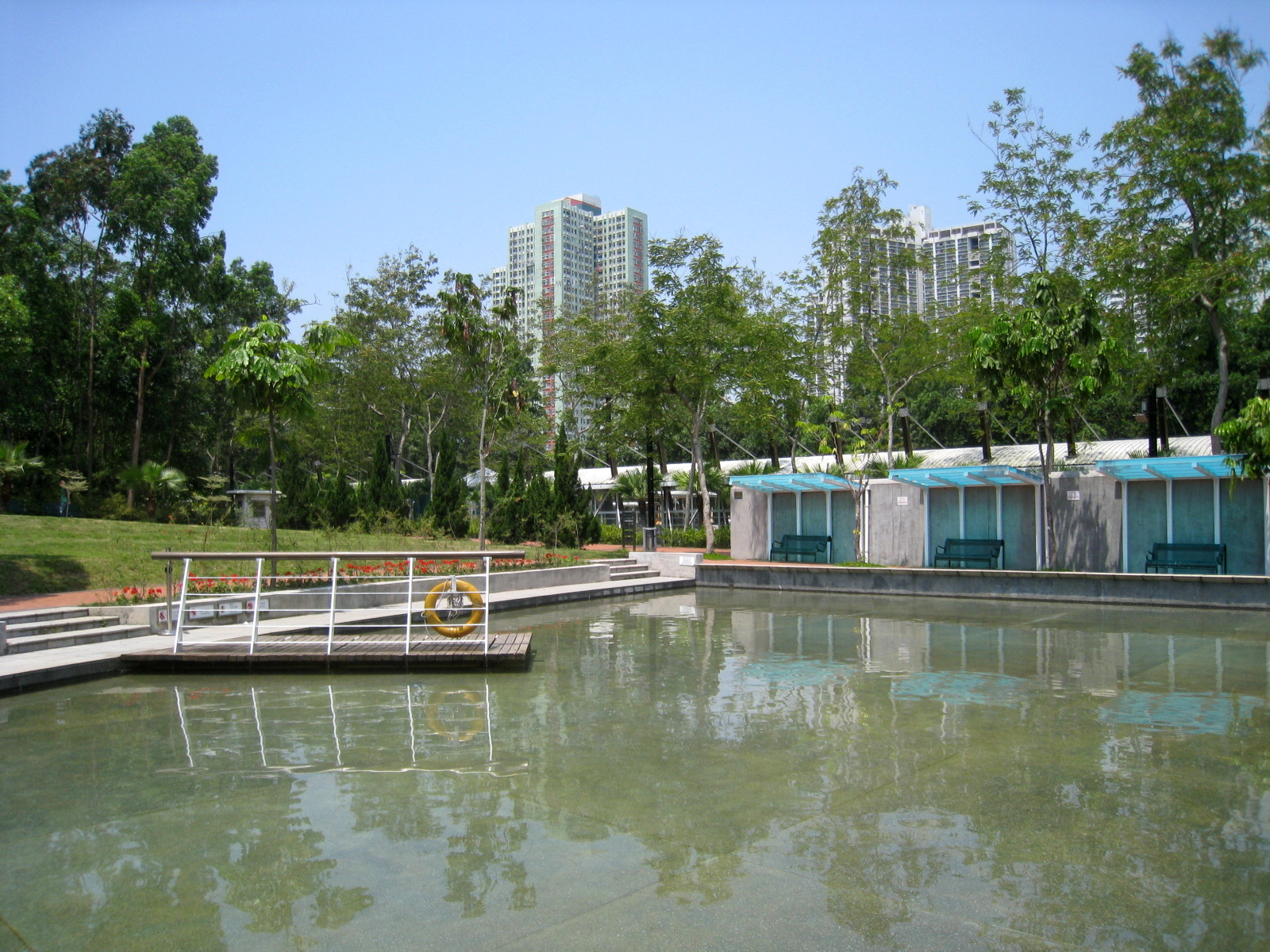
Model boat pool

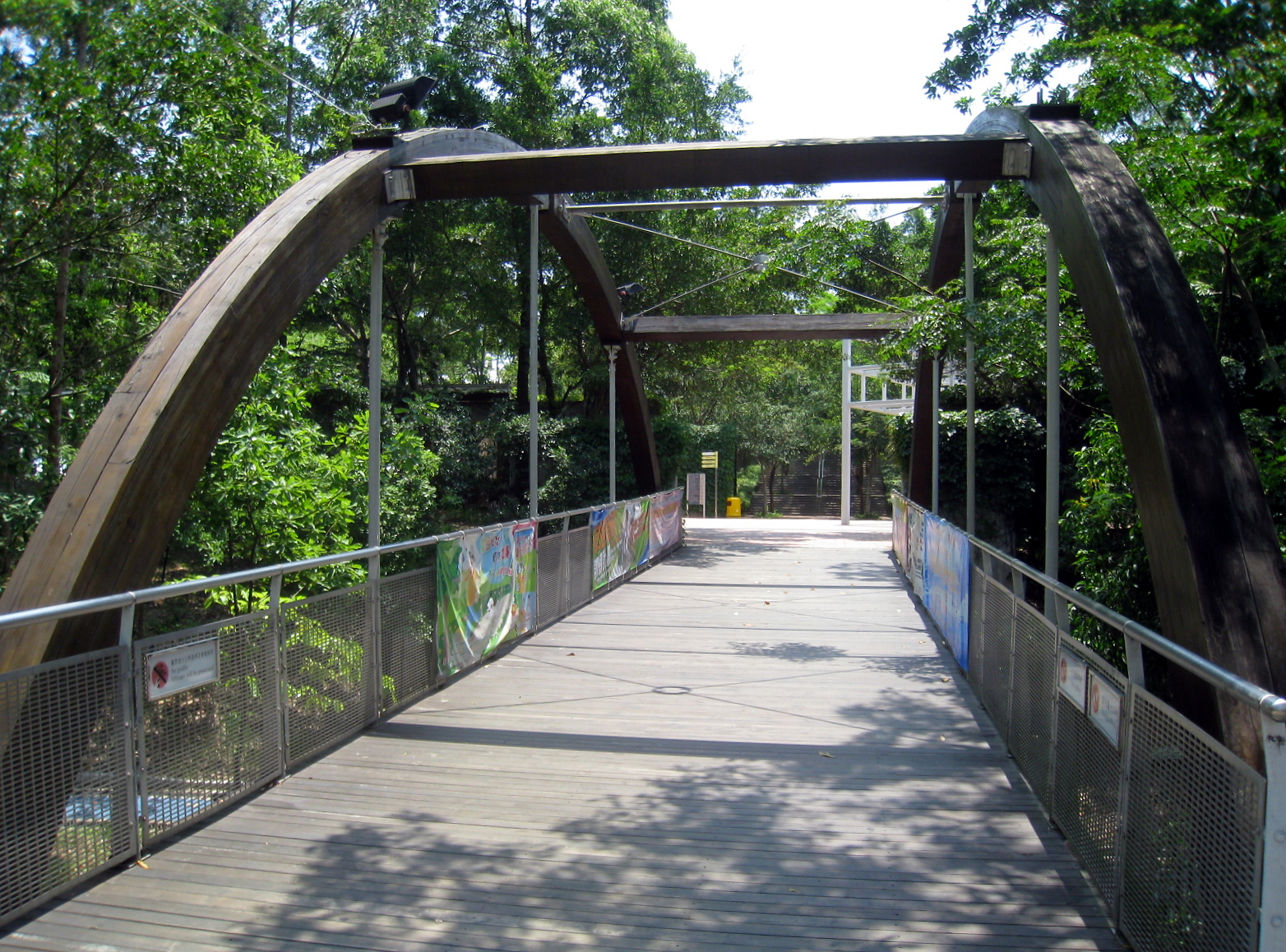
Bridge

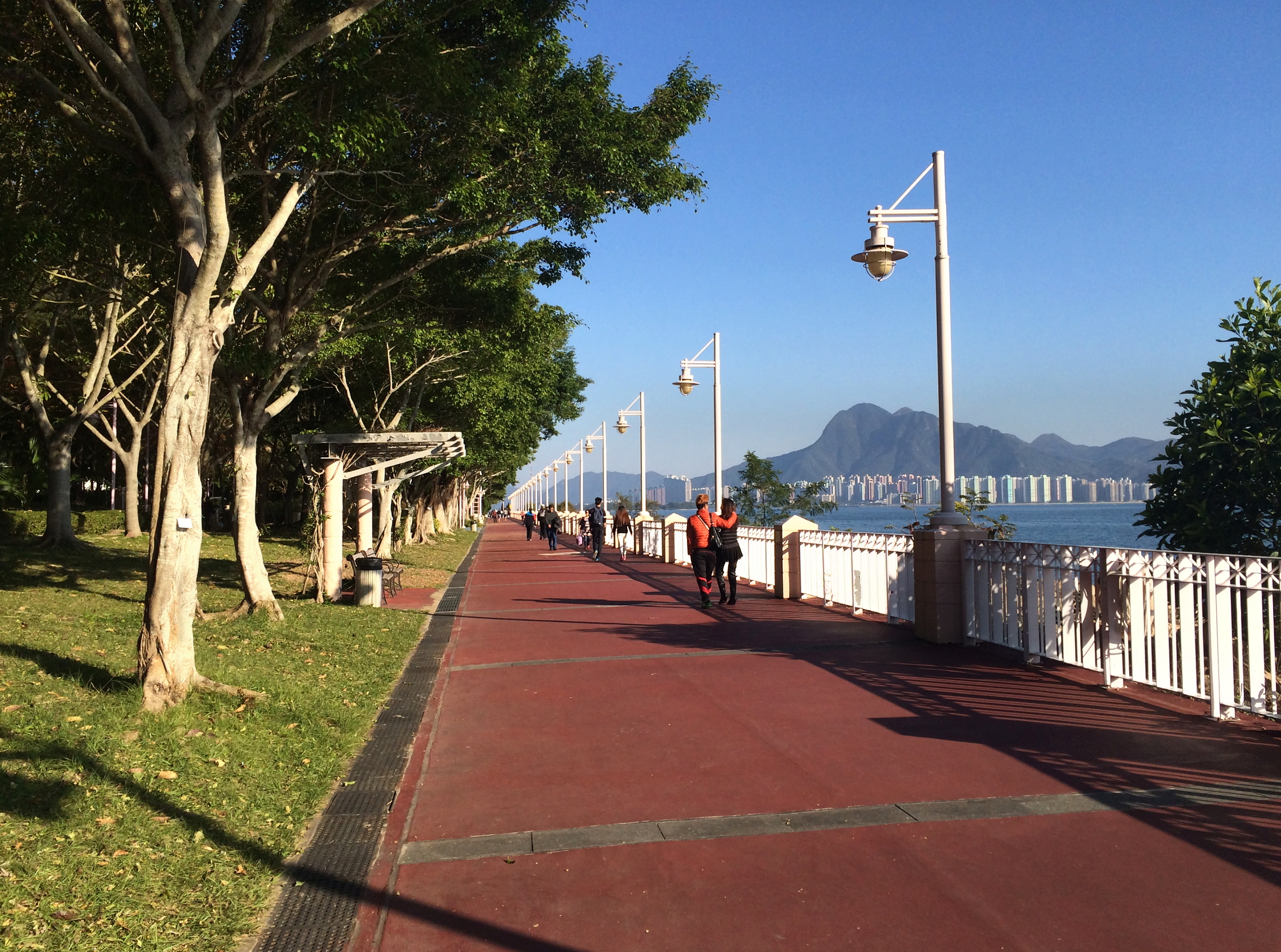
Seaside promenade

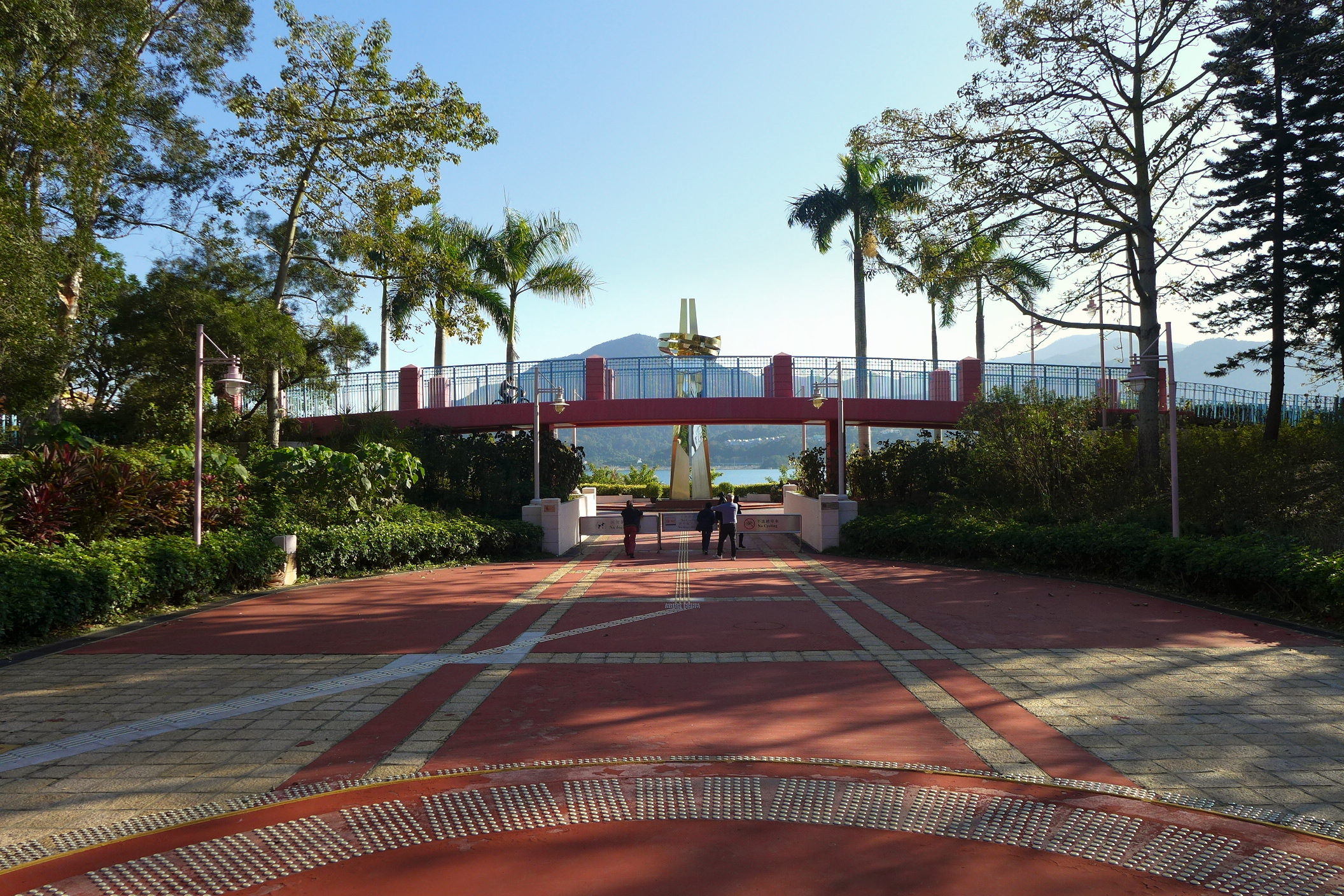
Entrance near industrial estate

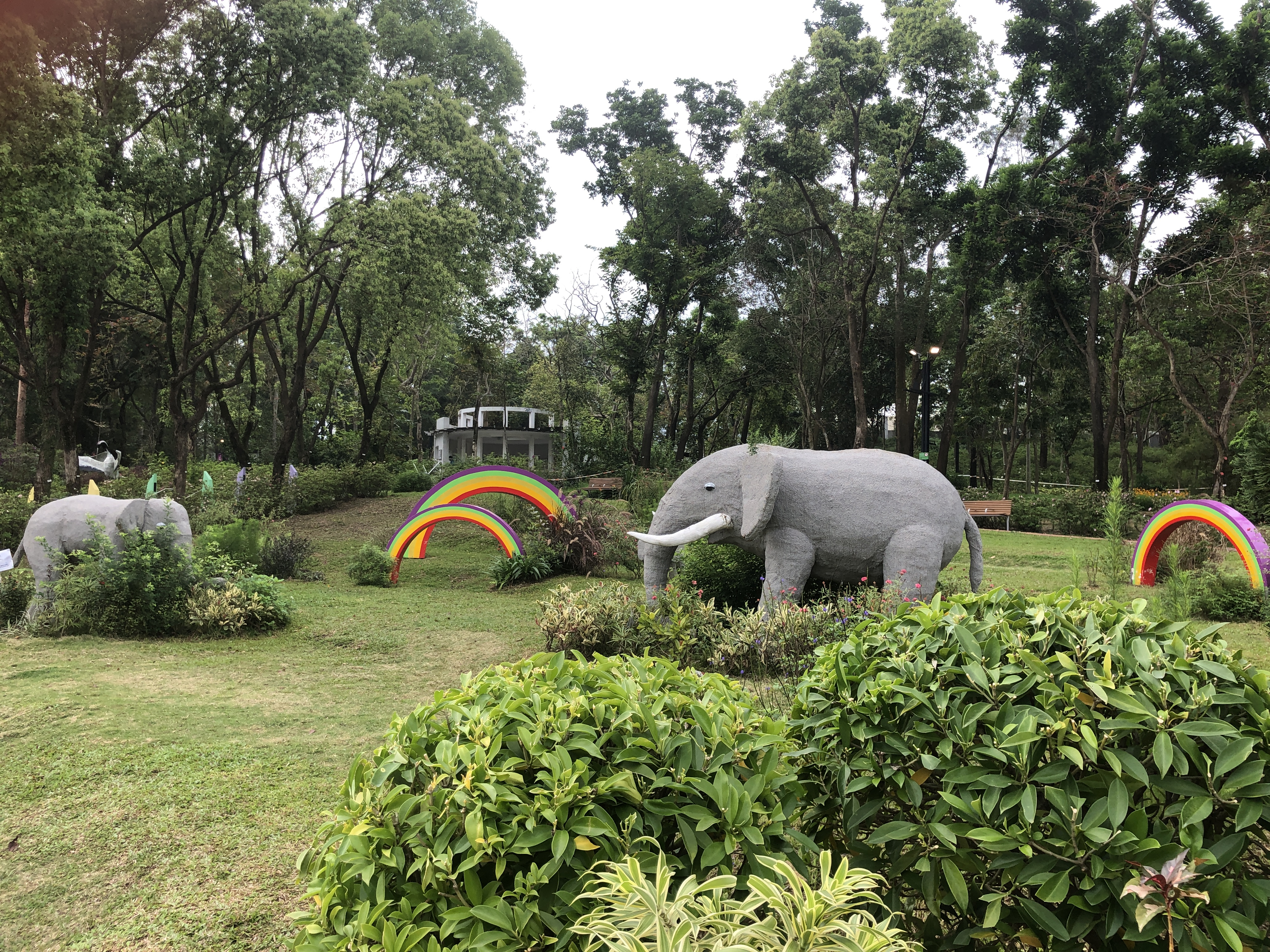
Some installation art about elephant and rainbow

== See also ==
- List of urban public parks and gardens in Hong Kong
