= Beverly the Bug =

Opal with an insect inclusion

Beverly the Bug is the first and only known opal with an insect inclusion. It contains "the exoskeleton of a nymphal insect belonging to the order Hemiptera and either the family Tettigarctidae or the Cicadidae".

It was found on Java in 2015. Gemologist Brian T. Berger purchased the gem in 2018 and named it Beverly the Bug. He submitted it to the Gemological Institute of America, which authenticated it as an "unaltered, untampered precious opal, with a genuine insect inclusion."

Though such inclusions are relatively common in amber, some opal-enclosed fossils have been discovered before among silica-containing rocks near geysers, but this is the first that appears to have been formed via the erosion of volcanic rocks. This raises the possibility that, if there was life on Mars (which had volcanic activity in its past), it too might be preserved the same way.

It has been displayed in the Perot Museum in Dallas, the Tellus Museum in Atlanta, and the Alfie Norville Museum in Arizona.
