= Beverly Hills, Baltimore =

Beverly Hills
- neighborhood statistical area
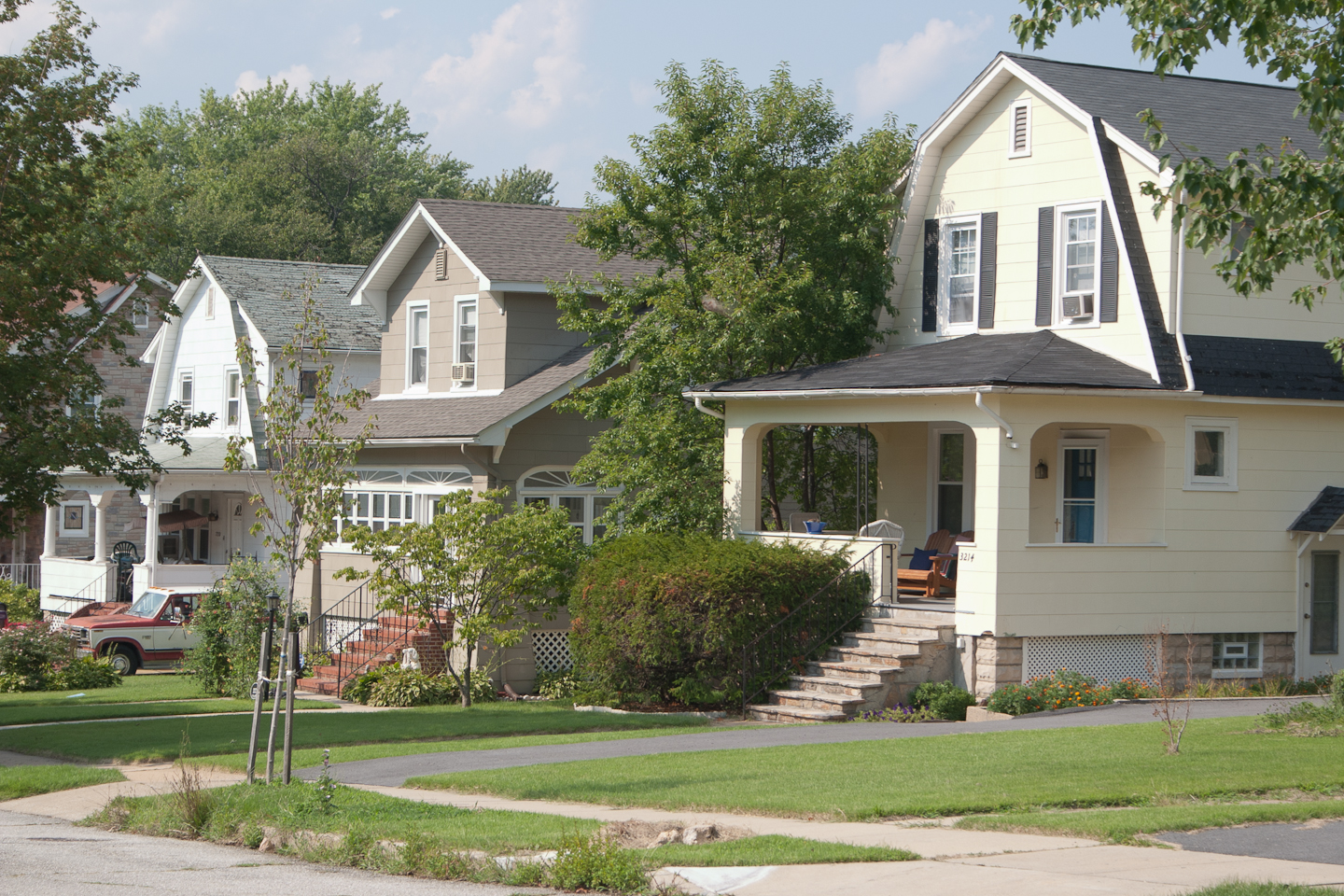
- Homes on Weaver Avenue

- Location within Baltimore
- Coordinates: 39.3371°N 76.5720°W
- Country: United States
- State: Maryland
- City: Baltimore

Area
  - Total: 0.133 sq mi (0.34 km^{2})
  - Land: 0.133 sq mi (0.34 km^{2})

Population (2009)
  - Total: 791
  - Density: 5,950/sq mi (2,300/km^{2})
- Time zone: UTC-5 (Eastern)
  - Summer (DST): UTC-4 (EDT)
- ZIP code: 21214
- Area code: 410, 443, and 667

Beverly Hills is a neighborhood in the Northeast District of Baltimore, located between the neighborhoods of Moravia-Walther, Arcadia and Lauraville. Its boundaries are drawn by Harford Road (west), Weaver Avenue (south), Harcourt Road (east), Moravia Road (northeast) and Grindon Avenue (north).

Most of the homes in Beverly Hills were built in 1929. The Beverly Hills Improvement Association was established during the same year to represent the interests of the neighborhood's residents.

== Demographics ==
About two-thirds of the neighborhood's population is white and one-third is black. With a median income of $63,508 estimated for 2009, Beverly Hills has fared well economically when compared with the city median of $38,772. Only 9.8 percent of its residents lived below the poverty level in 2009, while 22.9 percent of Baltimore's residents lived below the poverty line.

== Public services ==
The nearest public school is Hamilton Elementary/Middle School.

LocalLink 54 (BaltimoreLink) provides local and express bus service to Downtown Baltimore along Harford Road.

LocalLink 28 (BaltimoreLink) stops along Moravia Road as it travels between Moravia, on the east side of Baltimore, and the Rogers Avenue Metro Station, on the west side of the city.

== See also ==
List of Baltimore neighborhoods
