= Beverly Hill, Texas =

- Unincorporated community
- Location within Texas Location within the United States
- Coordinates: 33°04′09″N 96°29′23″W
- Country: United States
- State: Texas
- County: Collin
- Elevation: 512 ft (156 m)
- Time zone: UTC-6 (Central (CST))
  - Summer (DST): UTC-5 (CDT)
- GNIS feature ID: 1378005

Beverly Hill is an unincorporated community in Collin County, located in the U.S. state of Texas.
