= Beverly, Nebraska =

Unincorporated community in Nebraska, United States

- Unincorporated Community
- Location within Nebraska Location within the United States
- Coordinates: 40.3°N 101°W
- Country: United States
- State: Nebraska
- County: Hitchcock

Beverly is an unincorporated community in Hitchcock County, in the U.S. state of Nebraska.

== History ==
A post office was established at Beverly in 1881, and remained in operation until 1945. The community was named after Beverly, Massachusetts.
