= Lam Tsuen Valley =

Valley in the New Territories, Hong Kong

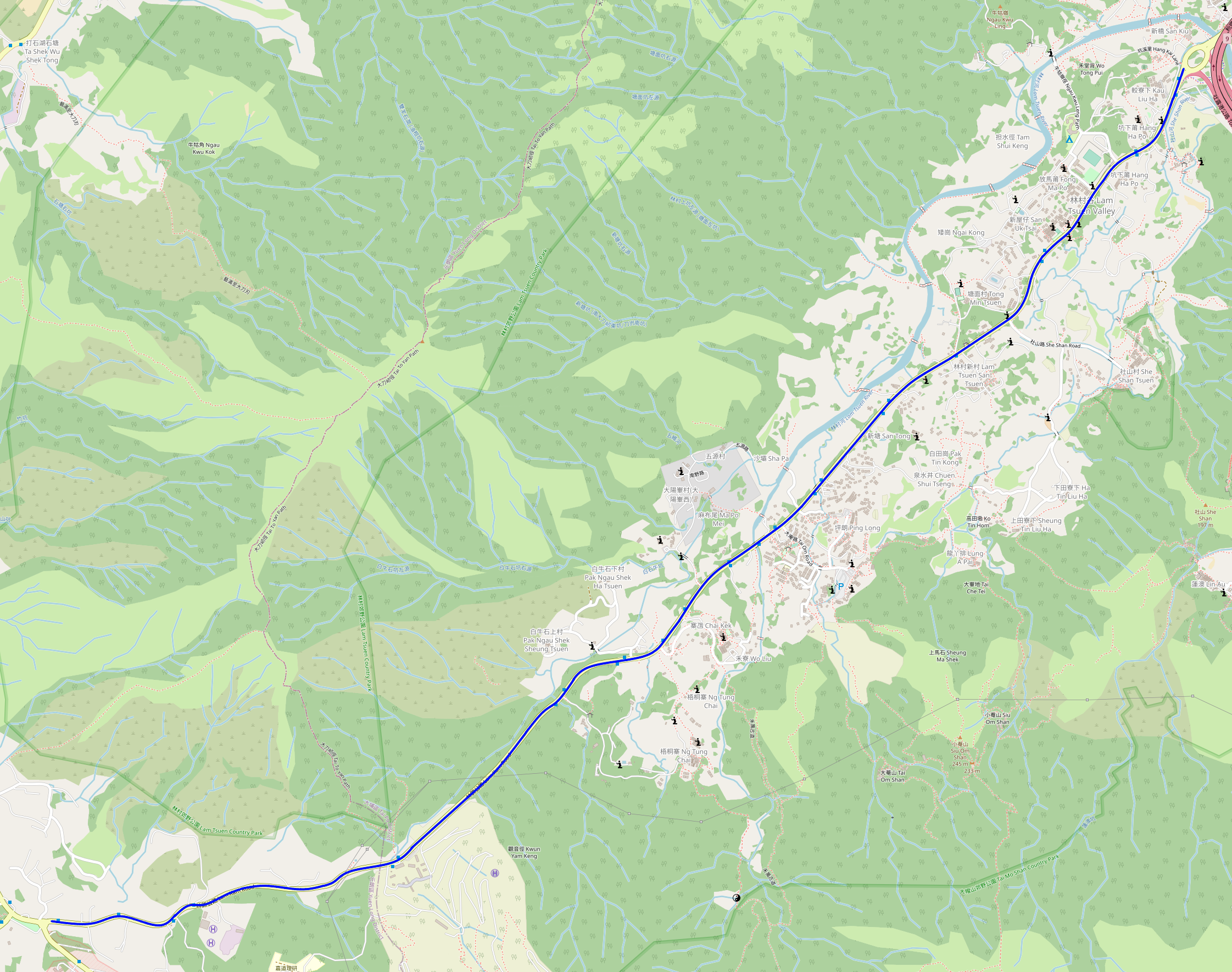
Map of Lam Kam Road (林錦公路) in Lam Tsuen Valley.

Lam Tsuen Valley (Chinese: 林村谷) is situated in the New Territories, Hong Kong, west of Tai Po New Town. Lam Tsuen and other villages are located in the valley. The Lam Tsuen River and its branches collect water from nearby hills. The area is suitable for cultivation, though fewer and fewer residents still participate in the agricultural sector. There is a country park.

== Features ==
- Kadoorie Farm
- Lam Tsuen wishing trees

== See also ==
- Lam Tsuen Valley (constituency)
