= Lam Tsuen River =

River in Hong Kong

- Traditional Chinese: 林村河
Transcriptions
Yue: Cantonese
- Jyutping: làhm chyūn hòh

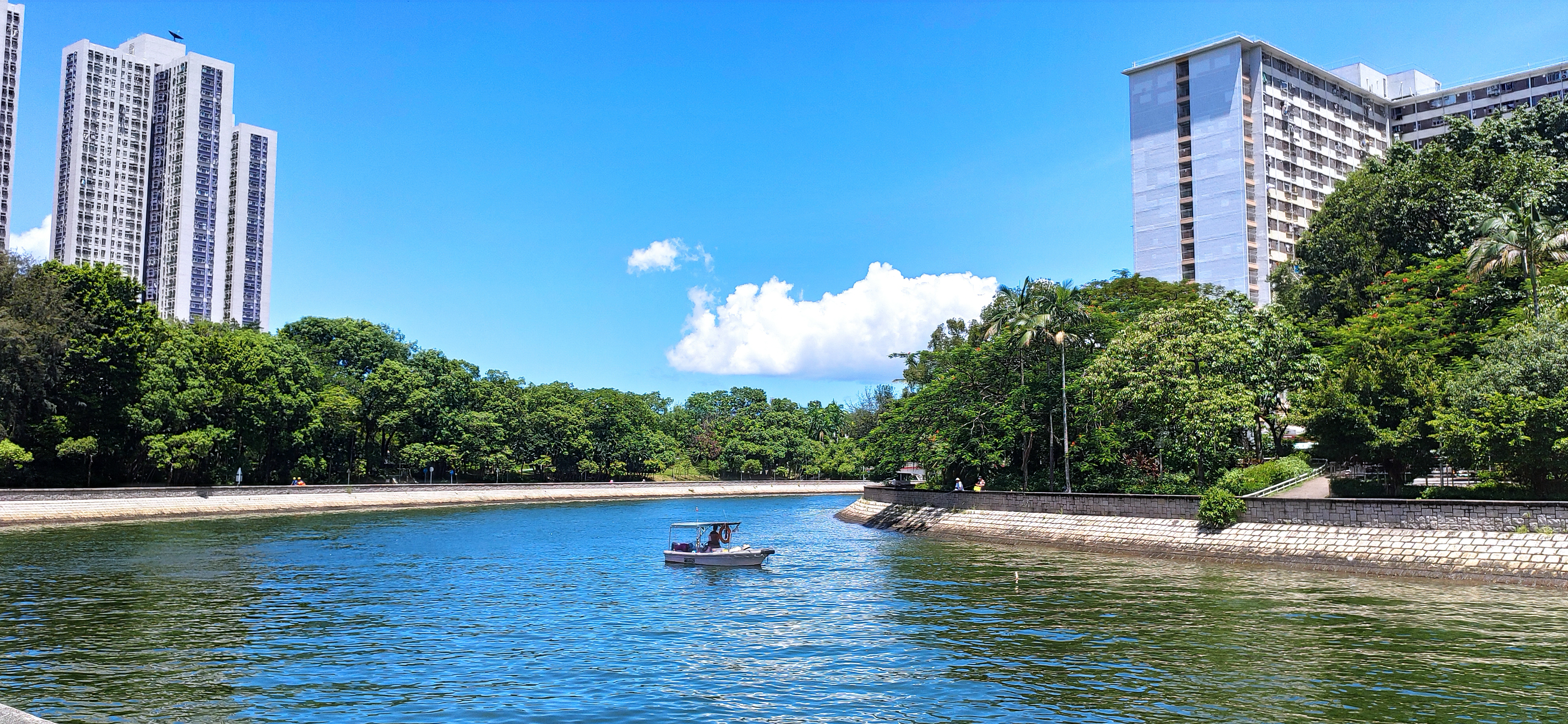
Lam Tsuen River near Tai Po Waterfront Park.

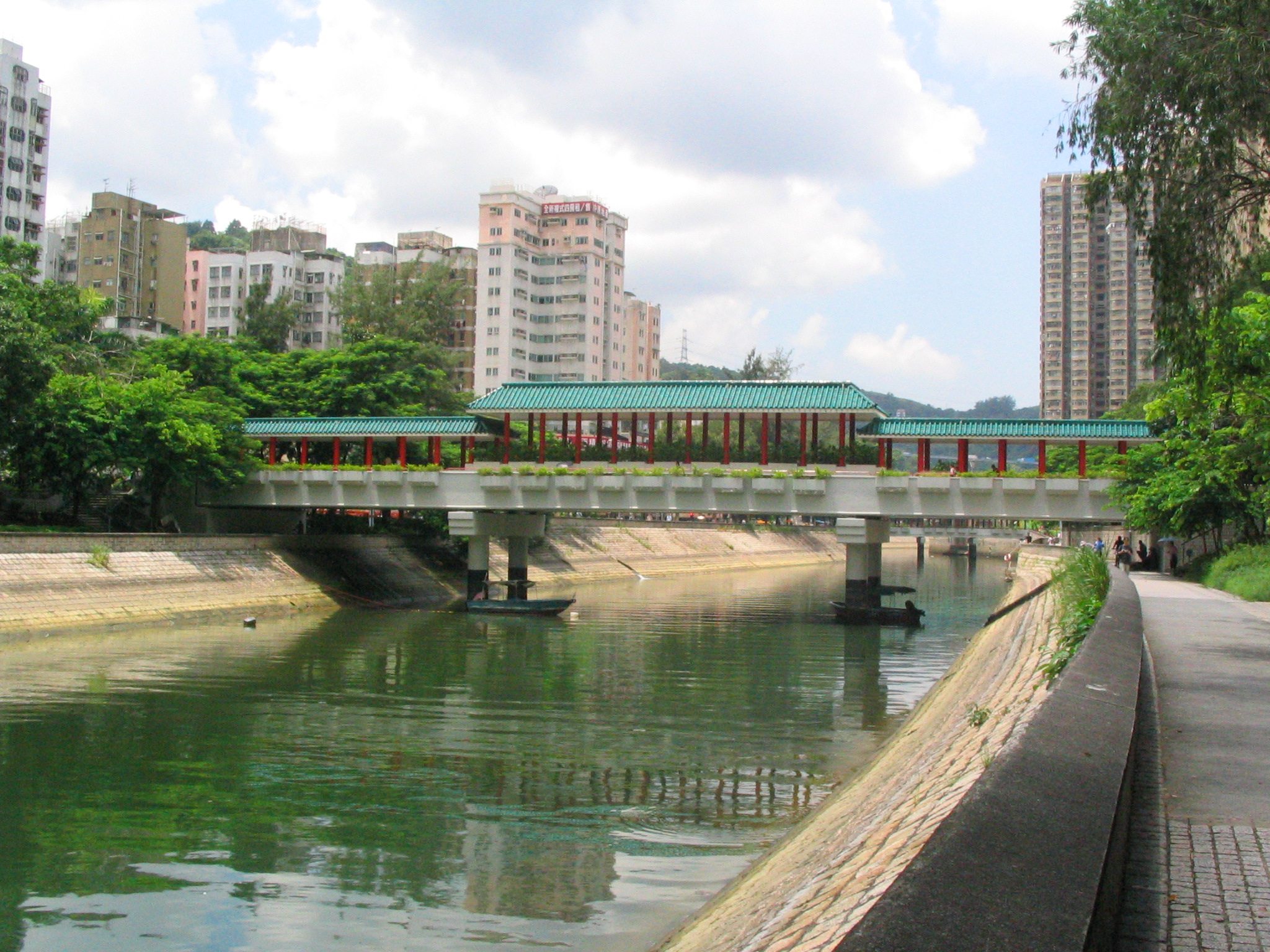
Lam Tsuen River near Kwong Fuk Bridge.

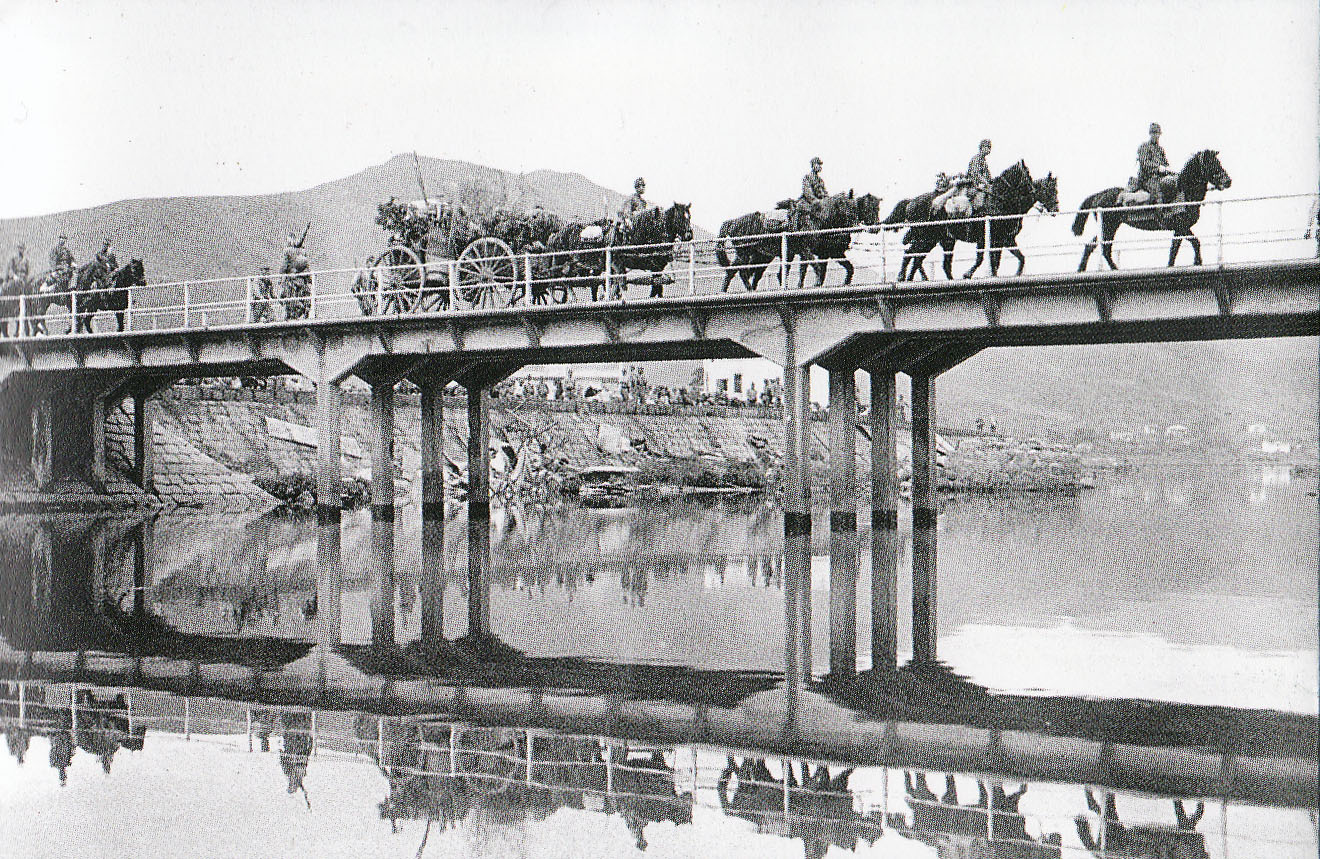
Japanese troops crossing the Kwong Fuk Bridge in December 1941.

The Lam Tsuen River (Chinese: 林村河; pinyin: lam4 cyun1 ho4) is a river in Tai Po District, Hong Kong, with a length of 10.8 kilometres and a catchment area of approximately 21 square kilometres. It originates in Tai Mo Shan Country Park on the hill Sze Fong Shan, and joins other watercourses in the Lam Tsuen Valley. Joined by the Tai Po River in Tai Po New Town, it eventually empties into Tolo Harbour.

== Kwong Fuk Bridge ==
Kwong Fuk Bridge (廣福橋) is a footbridge across the Lam Tsuen River. The first bridge on the site was erected in 1896, by local villagers. In early December 1941, the invading Japanese army crossed the bridge, then a steel girder construction, as they moved south. A road bridge was built on the site in 1948. A structure built in 1957 was replaced by the present version, which is in an ancient architectural style.

== See also ==
- List of rivers and nullahs in Hong Kong
