= Sha Tin New Town =

Sha Tin New Town 沙田新市鎮
- Satellite Town
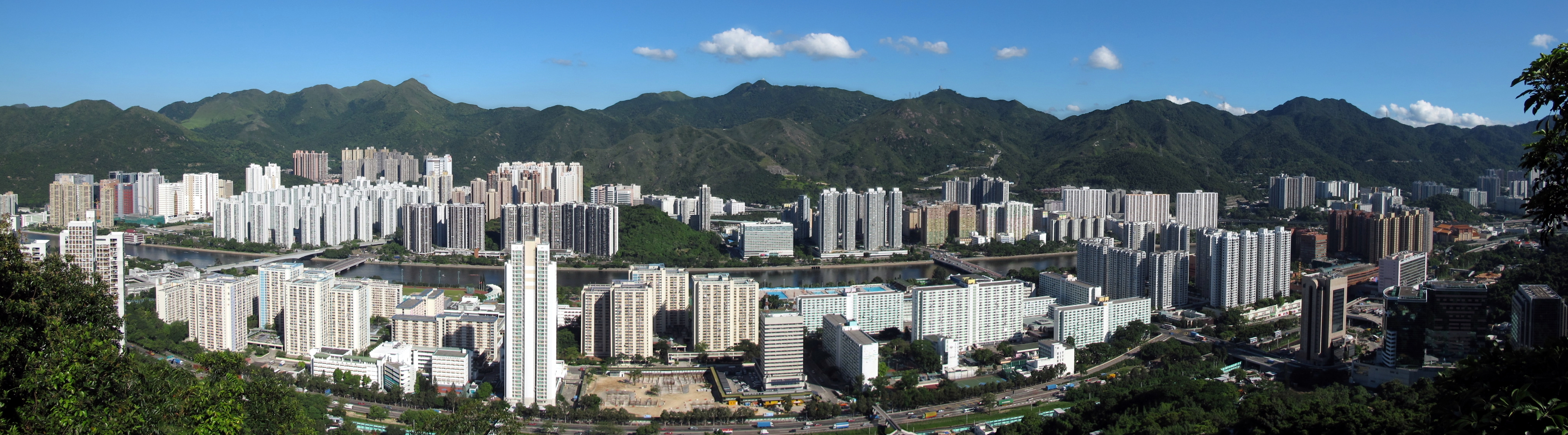
- Nickname: Sha Tin
- Location within Hong Kong
- Coordinates: 22.380238°N 114.189835°E
- Country: China
- SAR: Hong Kong
- Region: New Territories
- District: Sha Tin District

Population (2004)
  - Total: 640,000
- Time zone: UTC+8 (Hong Kong Time)

Sha Tin New Town
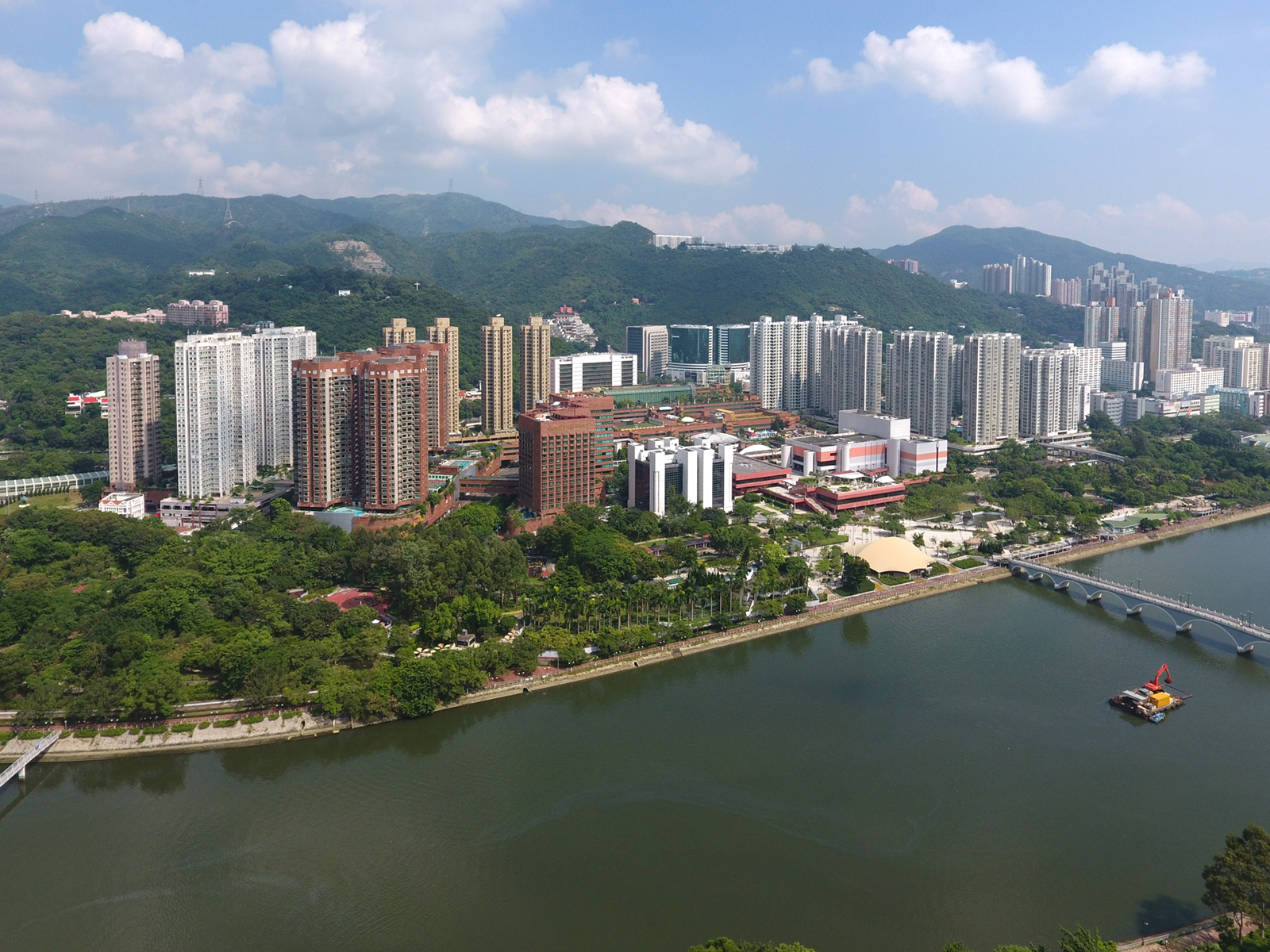
- The town centre of Shatin New Town
- Traditional Chinese: 沙田新市鎮
- Simplified Chinese: 沙田新市镇
Transcriptions
Standard Mandarin
- Hanyu Pinyin: Shātián Xīnshìzhèn
Yue: Cantonese
- Yale Romanization: Sāa tíhng sān síh jan
- Jyutping: Saa1 tin4 san1 si5 zan3

Sha Tin New Town, also known as Sha Tin-Ma On Shan New Town or Sha Tin Town, is one of the satellite towns and new towns of Hong Kong. It is within the Sha Tin District, the New Territories. The New Town covers the neighbourhoods of Sha Tin, Tai Wai, Fo Tan, Tai Shui Hang, and Ma On Shan. The Shing Mun River runs through the middle of the town.

== Development history ==
Development was started in the 1970s, and currently covers an area of 35.87 square kilometres with a total developed area of about 2,000 hectares (4,900 acres). As of 2004, it has a population of around 640,000 people. The town centre houses a mall, New Town Plaza, the Sha Tin Public Library, Sha Tin Town Hall, and other community facilities.

== Urban planning ==
Despite Sha Tin New Town including Ma On Shan, and the town itself is sometimes known as Sha Tin-Ma On Shan, Ma On Shan town has its own urban planning plan or Outline Zoning Plan (OZP), the "Ma On Shan Outline Zoning Plan". The plan was amended most recently in 2020. Neighbourhoods such as Sha Tin, Tai Wai, Fo Tan are included in the "Sha Tin Outline Zoning Plan".

The Science Park-Pak Shek Kok development, also located in Sha Tin New Town, has its own OZP too, but part of the area of that development is located in Tai Po District.

== Transport ==
=== Highways, roads and tunnels ===
The road transport between Sha Tin New Town and Kowloon relies on the Lion Rock Tunnel (completed in 1967), Tate's Cairn Tunnel (completed in 1988), the Shing Mun Tunnels, and Tai Po Road. The Tolo Highway was opened in September 1985. It connects Sha Tin Road and Tai Po Road, forming a connection system between the New Town and Tai Po New Town. Tate's Cairn Highway also connects Ma On Shan with Tolo Highway. The opening of Sai Sha Road in October 1988 provided a connection between Sha Tin and Sai Kung. The T3 Highway (Tsing Sha Highway) and the Cheung Sha Wan to Sha Tin section of Route 8 between was completed in March 2008.

=== Public transport ===
The New Town has numerous bus routes connecting to the city centre and metro stations from various populated zones in the New Town. Besides bus services, minibus services are provided as well for residential areas with fewer people.

=== KCR (now East Rail line, MTR) ===
KCR, which has since merged with the former MTR, was essential to the development of new town. There are five East Rail line stations within the new town, namely Tai Wai, Sha Tin, Fo Tan, Racecourse and University. Part of the Tuen Ma line also lies within the New Town, namely the section from Hin Keng station to the eastern terminus of Wu Kai Sha station. Passengers are able to transfer between the East Rail line and Tuen Ma line at Tai Wai station.
