= Tai Po New Town =

New (satellite) town in Tai Po, Hong Kong

Tai Po New Town 大埔新市鎮
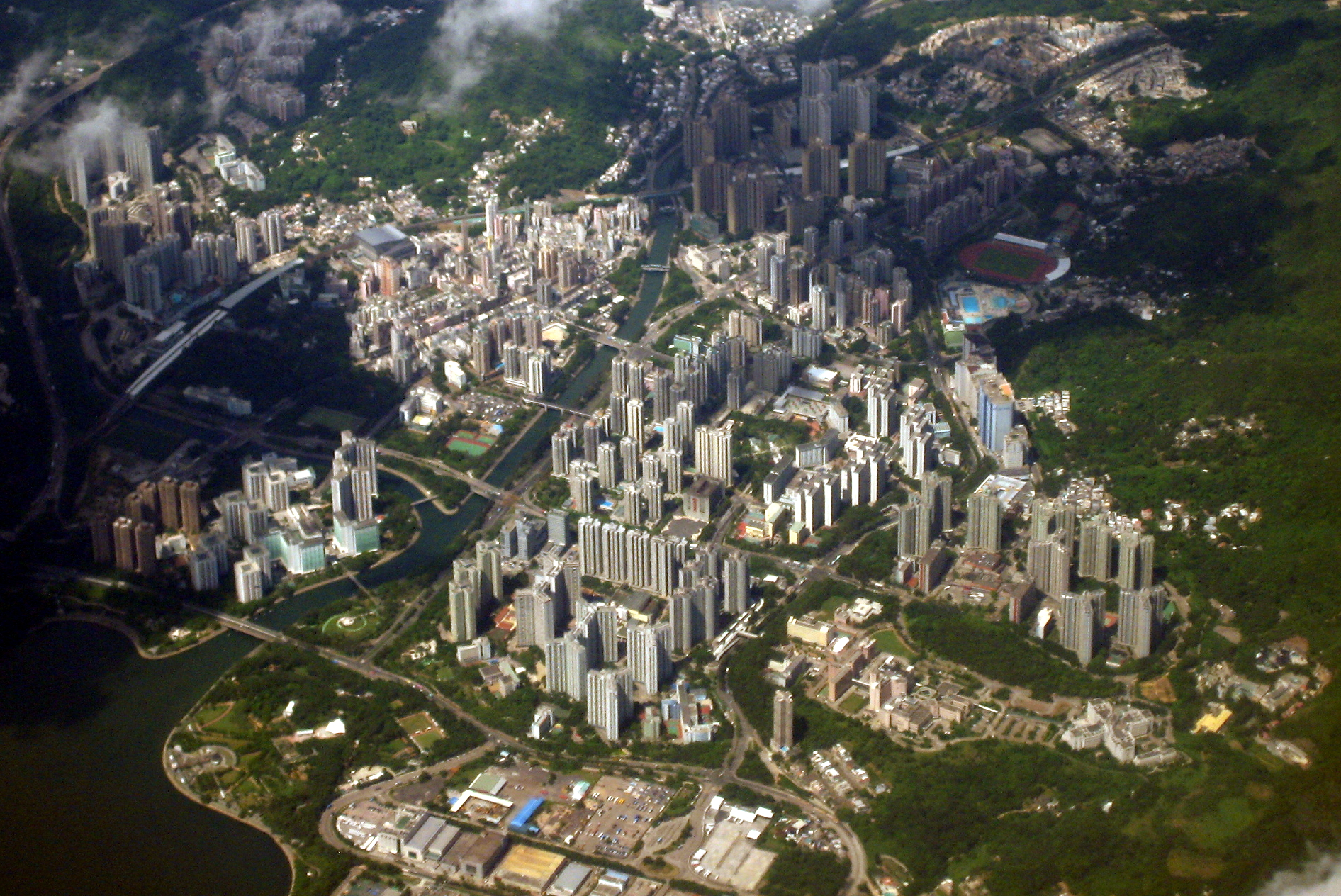
- Aerial view of Tai Po New Town
- Etymology: name after the historic market town Tai Po Market
- Nickname: Tai Po
- Location within Hong Kong
- Coordinates: 22°26′41″N 114°10′14″E
- Country: Hong Kong
- District: Tai Po District
- Time zone: UTC+8

Tai Po New Town
- Traditional Chinese: 大埔新市鎮
- Simplified Chinese: 大埔新市镇
Transcriptions
Standard Mandarin
- Hanyu Pinyin: Dàbù Xīnshìzhèn
Yue: Cantonese
- Yale Romanization: Daaih bou sān síh jan
- Jyutping: Daai6 bou3 san1 si5 yan3

Tai Po Town
- Chinese: 大埔市
Transcriptions
Standard Mandarin
- Hanyu Pinyin: Dàbùshì
Yue: Cantonese
- Yale Romanization: Daaih bou síh
- Jyutping: Daai6 bou3 si5

Tai Po New Town, or Tai Po Town (Chinese: 大埔新市鎮), is a new town (satellite town) and non-administrative area in Tai Po District, in the New Territories, Hong Kong. The area is a planned town that surrounding the existing indigenous market towns of Tai Po Market and Tai Po Old Market, as well as east of the existing indigenous villages that located on the Lam Tsuen Valley as well as west of those villages in Ting Kok and Tai Mei Tuk and south of those villages in Nam Hang, Fung Yuen and Sha Lo Tung. Most of the lands of the new town were obtained by land reclamation. In the present day, Tai Po New Town is simply known as Tai Po.

The new town is largely covered by the government Tai Po Outline Zoning Plan, which legally regulates the land use of the area, on top of the terms in the land lease contract with the government. Some of the land lease within the area, were known as Tai Po Town Lot № foo. In elections, the town has a different zoning scheme for the election constituencies.

== History of development ==
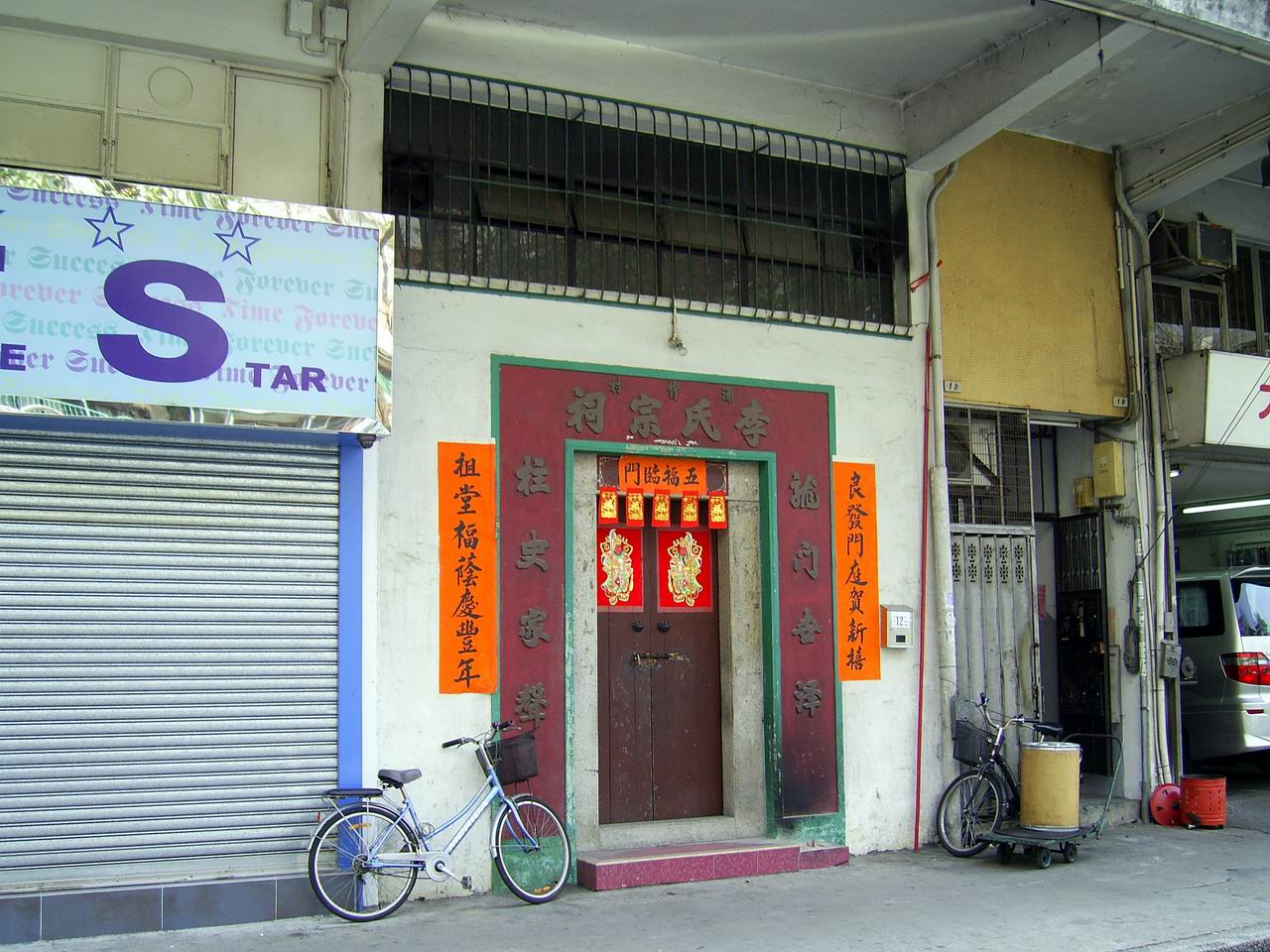
Lee clan ancestral hall in Luk Heung San Tsuen

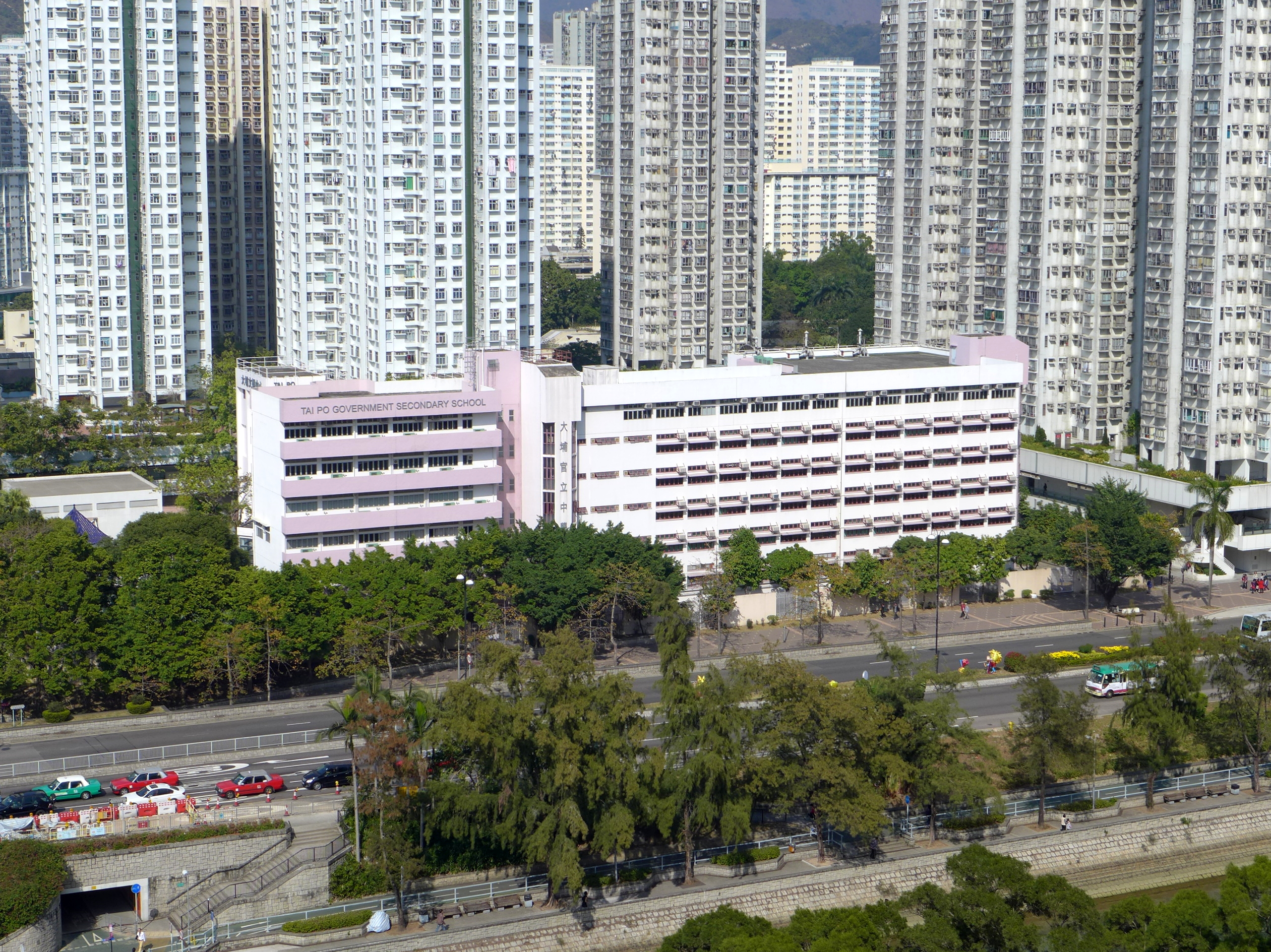
Tai Po Government Secondary School, Tai Po Civic Centre and private housing estates Tai Po Centre and Fortune Plaza

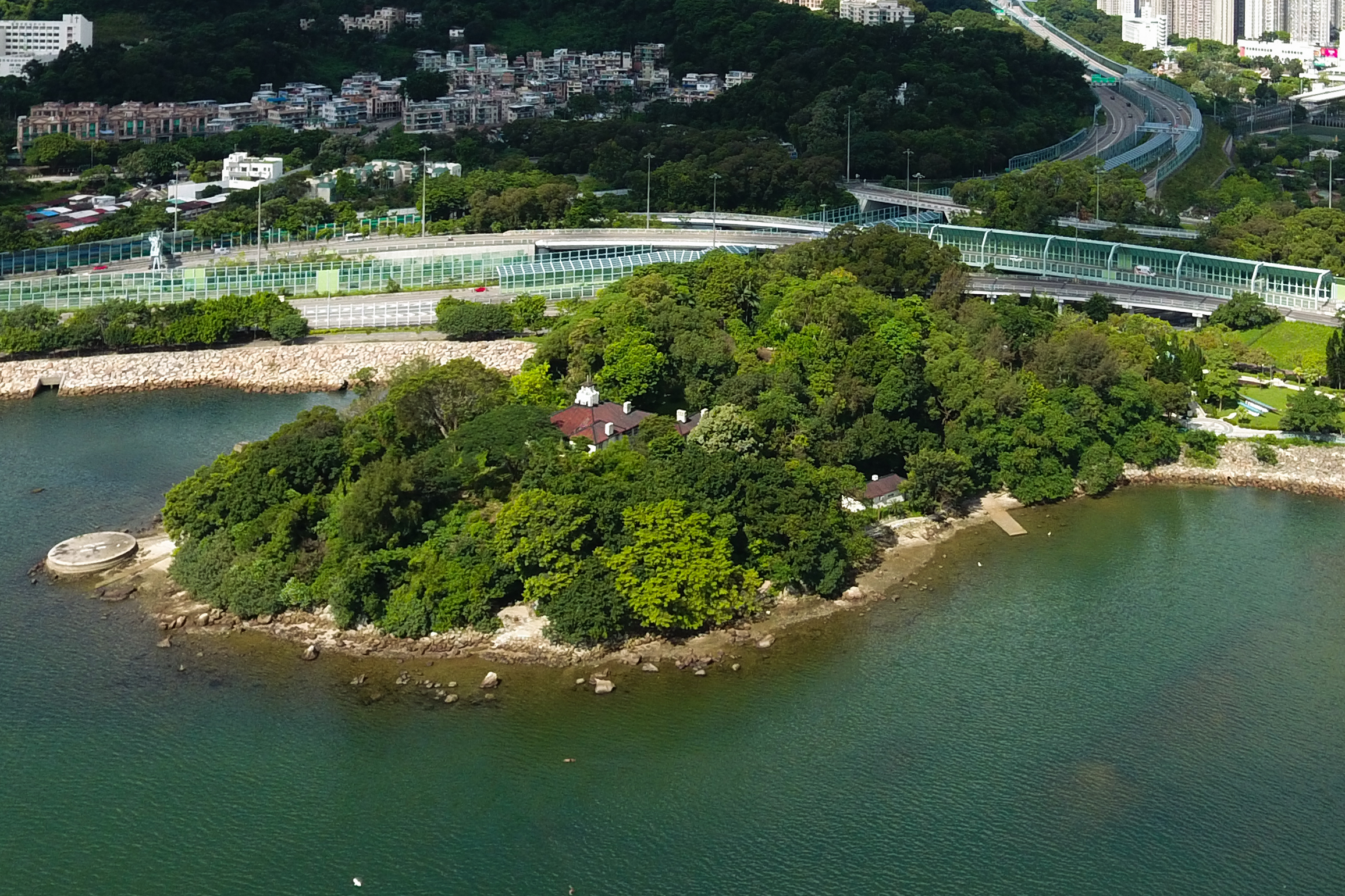
former island Yuen Chau Tsai. Island House is located on the island. Park on the right was Yuen Chau Tsai Park

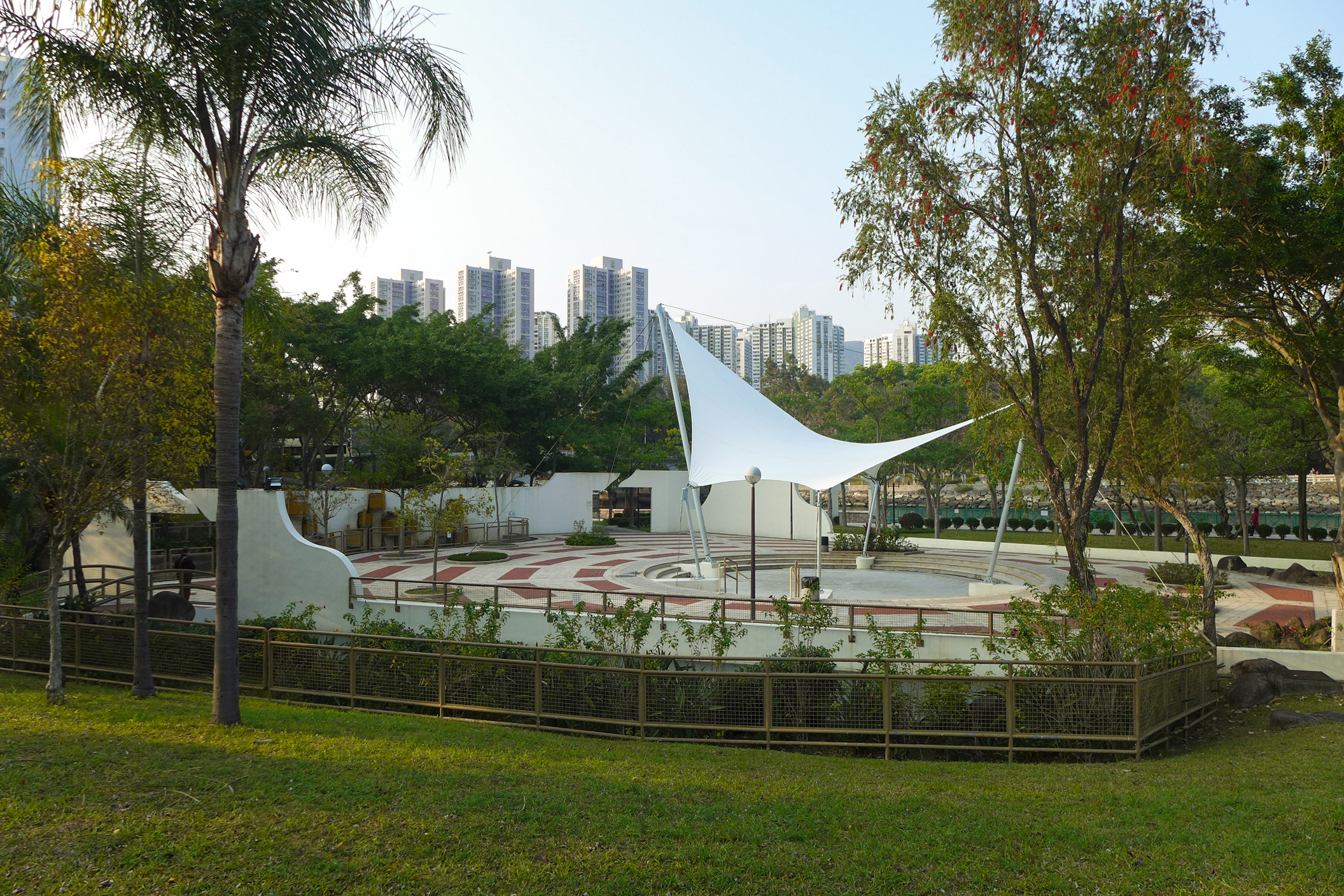
An amphitheatre of Yuen Chau Tsai Park

The new town was designed to be expanded from and incorporate the previously existing areas of Tai Po Market and Tai Po Old Market, traditional market towns that served both rural villages of Tang clan Tai Po branch and non-Tang's village alliance Tai Po Tsat Yeuk as well as people by water route from Ma On Shan and other places. The market towns were established in the Qing dynasty. After the concession of the area now known as the New Territories and New Kowloon to the British Empire, the colonial Hong Kong government also established the District Office North (founded as District Office which also oversee villages that belongs to the present day Sha Tin District), an administrate department, in the area that belongs to the modern day Tai Po New Town in 1907. The building was next to the former site of the Tai Po police station, as well as the Island House, the residence of the District Officer. The market towns received expansion in the 1960s, due to the relocation of indigenous villages to the newly reclaimed land next to the Tai Po Market, as well as the construction of Tai Po Industrial Estate which started in 1974. From 1976,^{[sic]} extensive reclamation work was carried out near the mouth of the Lam Tsuen River in Tolo Harbour in order to create land for the new town.

The new town was a planned area, which had "suitable sites have been reserved for various types of land-uses including residential, commercial, industrial and open space, and for the provision of different types of community and infrastructural facilities to meet the needs of the population." The new town was divided between residential and industrial areas, with a mix of public and private housing. The Tai Po Industrial Estate southwest of Ting Kok is one of the major industrial estates in Hong Kong. The gas factory of Hong Kong and China Gas was located in the estate. As of 2018, the estate also consists of tenants such as Asia Television, AsiaSat, APT Satellite, Oriental Press Group, South China Morning Post Publishers etc.. Tai Po New Town also had a smaller industrial area known as Tai Ping Industrial Centre.

The new town was served by two new railway stations, which are now part of the mass transit system of the city, new Tai Po Market station and Tai Wo station respectively. The already existing Tai Po Kau and old Tai Po Market railway stations, however, were closed in 1983. The latter which had previously served the traditional market town Tai Po Market (Tai Wo Shi), became the Hong Kong Railway Museum, one of the public museums of Tai Po District. In terms of road transport, Tolo Highway was completed in the 1980s, which largely replaced Tai Po Road as the main road between the new town and city centre.

One of the earliest development of the present day Tai Po new town, were multi-storied estates on newly reclaimed land on Kwong Fuk Road circa the 1960s to 1970s. The housing estates, known as Luk Heung San Tsuen were served as the compensation for villages that were suffered from the construction of the Plover Cove Reservoir, whose farmland would be under water after the construction of the reservoir. Despite that, those buildings are now much older than other buildings of the new town, and make up the Tai Po District Council Election Constituency of Tai Po Hui. The area could traced back to its origins in the Plover Cove by the name of the local street Luk Heung Lane (陸鄉里), a namesake of Luk Heung (lit. "Six Villages"), as well as an ancestral hall. Those villages from Luk Heung conducted their business activities in Sha Tau Kok in the past. The Lane-Square in Tai Po, or known as the "Four Lanes" were also built circa the 1960s.

In 1972, the Executive Council, the de facto cabinet of the Hong Kong colonial government, had approved a 10-year housing plan, which included a proposed expansion of Tai Po, Fanling–Sheung Shui-Shek Wu Hui and Yuen Long as new towns.

In 1976, Tai Po New Town project was formally announced. Differing from Luk Heung San Tsuen, which was a relocation of rural population to the rural town centre, the new town project was to be an influx of urban population from the existing built-up area of the city.

In 1980, the first public rental housing estate of the new town, Tai Yuen Estate, was completed. It was followed by Fu Heng Estate, Fu Shin Estate, Kwong Fuk Estate, Tai Wo Estate and Wan Tau Tong Estate (in alphabetical order); Po Heung Estate is currently the latest public rental housing estate of Tai Po in the Tai Po Market area as a re-development project of existing public facility of the traditional market town. The establishment of Tai Wo Estate and Tai Wo station, also shifted the area that corresponded to the name Tai Wo, from Tai Po Market (was established as Tai Wo Shi; at the time of establishment, Tai Po Old Market was known as Tai Po Market) to the area around Tai Wo Estate. The new town also composed of many private housing estates, as well as public-private housing estates that were subsidized under the Home Ownership Scheme.

The New Town project also made Yuen Chau Tsai fishing village obsolete. Fishermen that formerly lived on their boats, were relocated in the 1970s, initially to temporary housing areas such as Yue Kok (漁角; 'fishing corner'), and then public housing estates. Yuen Chau Tsai is now known for Island House, the fishermen temple, Tai Wong Yeh Temple, and nearby Yuen Chau Tsai Park.

Wong Shiu Chi Secondary School, SKH Bishop Mok Sau Tseng Secondary School and Carmel Pak U Secondary School, all of which are subsidized secondary schools, were founded in 1960, 1975 and 1979 respectively. Tai Po Government Secondary School, was founded in 1984 and folded in 2014. As of 2018, there were 19 secondary schools in the whole Tai Po District, all within the Tai Po New Town.

Alice Ho Miu Ling Nethersole Hospital, was relocated to Tai Po New Town in 1997. The town was previously served by the Prince of Wales Hospital in the Sha Tin District before its relocation. In 1997, the Hong Kong Institute of Education, a tertiary public school, moved to its new Tai Po campus. Both facilities were built on existing hilly area of the new town.

According to the Civil Engineering and Development Department of Hong Kong, Hong Kong Science Park in Pak Shek Kok, was also within the scope of Tai Po New Town. However, in later document, the new town project was renamed to "Tai Po New Town and Pak Shek Kok Development". Pak Shek Kok is currently served by the University station of MTR.

=== In urban planning ===
In the Town Planning Board of Hong Kong, the area was known as "Tai Po Outline Zoning Plan" (Tai Po OZP). The zoning plan roughly covered the Tai Po New Town (including Tai Po Industrial Estate), as well as Tai Po Market and Tai Po Old Market. The zoning plan also covered some of the indigenous villages of Tai Po District, but indigenous villages on the Lam Tsuen Valley, were regulated by Lam Tsuen Outline Zoning Plan instead. The aforementioned science park and surrounding residential area in Pak Shek Kok, had its own OZP: Pak Shek Kok (East) Outline Zoning Plan. Other areas of the Tai Po District, such as the northern Sai Kung Peninsula belonged to other OZPs of the board.

=== Scrapped facilities ===
It was reported that the area of the modern day Tai Wo Estate, was originally planned for industrial use. However, the plan was scrapped in 1983.

The new town currently has a public auditorium and theatre, Tai Po Civic Centre, which was opened in 1985 on On Pong Road, next to private housing estate of Tai Po Centre. A larger facility, Tai Po Town Hall (大埔大會堂), which could compare to Sha Tin Town Hall, was planned in the new town, east of private housing estate Plover Cove Garden (寶湖花園). However, the construction of such a facility was scrapped or postponed indefinitely. Another facility, Tai Po Public Library, was separated from the planned town hall, and incorporated into Tai Po Complex, a new government building that was completed in 2004. The complex was a re-development project within the older area of Tai Po in Tai Po Market. The Government had used part of the shopping centre of Plover Cove Garden as the temporary site of the public library for more than a decade. In 2016, the government propose building Tai Po Sports Centre, Tai Po Community Hall and two 7-a-side football fields, on the existing planned site of Tai Po Town Hall.

== Future developments ==
In 2012, Hong Kong government proposed 25 new land reclamation sites in a public consultation. In those 25 sites, some of them were located in Tai Po District which were near to the existing Tai Po new town. In particular, the residents of Tai Po who were against the sites near Plover Cove, Tai Po Waterfront Park and Tai Po Kau by forming online interest group. Another proposed site near Pak Shek Kok in the Tolo Harbour, had also gathered more than 3,000 signatures in a petition. Of those 25 sites, only 6 of them were included in the stage 2 public consultation, which only included the aforementioned one in Tolo Harbour, but excluding the three other sites near Tai Po New Town. In 2018, one of the 6 sites in the stage 2 consultation, became a new project known as Lantau Tomorrow Vision. However, many citizens and environmental protection organizations were against the project. Our Hong Kong Foundation, a pro-government think tank, had employed Hong Kong Institute of Asia-Pacific Studies of the Chinese University of Hong Kong to conduct a survey. The survey shown 45.3% agreed reclamation outside the Victoria Harbour, while 33.9% against. In February 2019, the government announced that "it has fully accepted the recommendations tendered by the Task Force on Land Supply," including using reclamation as a mean to obtain new lands for development. However, it was also announced that the reclamation plan in Ma Liu Shui in Tolo Harbour was postponed, despite its inclusion in the recommendations by the Task Force. Thus, it is uncertain that the reclamations in the water of Tolo Harbour will go ahead or not.

== Cityscape ==
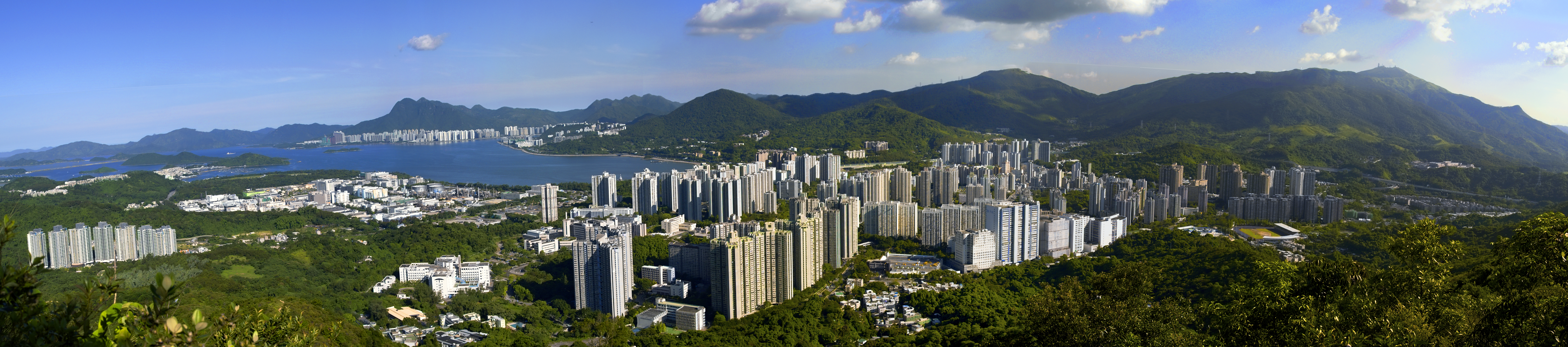

== See also ==
- Tai Wo: a place name in Tai Po New Town, which the name was referred to Tai Po Market in the past but currently refer to Tai Wo Estate
