= New towns of Hong Kong =

Newly developed towns in the 20th century

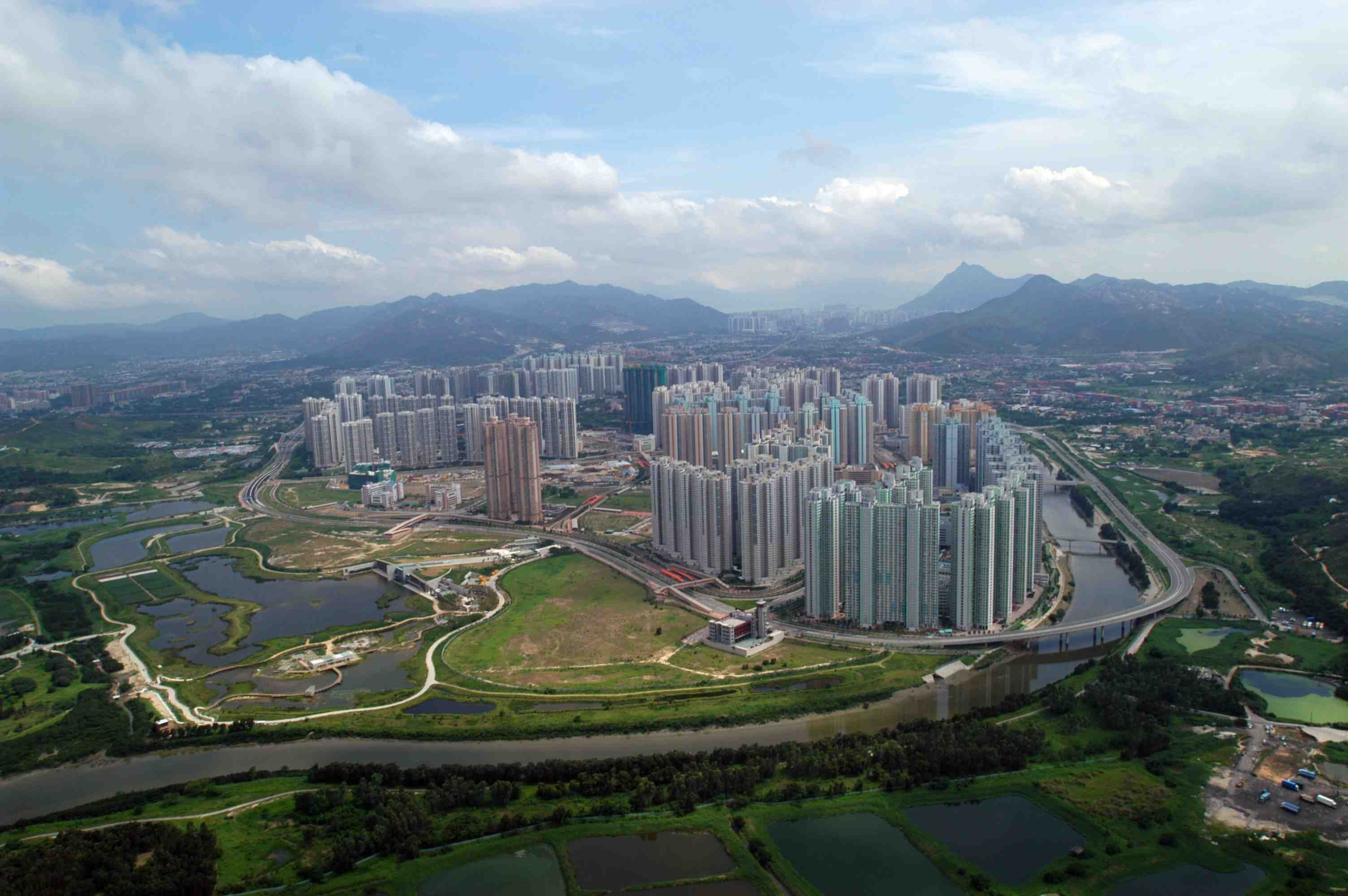
Tin Shui Wai

The government of Hong Kong started developing new towns in the 1950s to accommodate Hong Kong's booming population. During the first phase of development, the newly developed towns were called "satellite towns", a concept borrowed from the United Kingdom, of which Hong Kong was a colony. Kwun Tong, located in eastern Kowloon, and Tsuen Wan, located in the south-west of the New Territories, were designated as the first satellite towns, when the urban area in Hong Kong was still relatively small, restricted to the central and western parts of Kowloon Peninsula and the northern side of Hong Kong Island. Wah Fu Estate was also built in a remote corner on the southern side of Hong Kong Island, with similar concepts but at a smaller scale.

Plans to develop new areas were continued in the late 1960s and 1970s, when the name “new town” was officially adopted. As most flat lands in Hong Kong Island and Kowloon had already been developed, the government proposed to build new towns in the New Territories, a largely rural area at that time. The first phase of new-town development, which began in 1973, included Tsuen Wan, Sha Tin and Tuen Mun. With the success of these new towns, and the experience gained from building them, the government launched further stages of new-town development in subsequent decades. To date, nine new towns have been built, and about half of the Hong Kong population lives in these newly developed areas. After the government had built a new town on Lantau Island in the 1990s, the pace at which it developed new towns slowed in the 2000s, owing to lower population growth. As demand rose in the housing market and it became difficult for residents to buy new homes, the Hong Kong government suggested that new towns be built again in the 2010s, hoping thereby to increase the supply in the private housing market and provide more flats for public housing. For example, Hung Shui Kiu, Kwu Tung North and North Fanling have been proposed by the government and currently under public consultation.

Land use is carefully planned in new towns, and development sets aside plenty of room for public housing projects. Highways, tunnels, bridges and railways have been built for accessibility. The first few new towns, such as Tuen Mun, Sha Tin, Yuen Long and Tai Po, were intended to be self-reliant, each having not only residential areas but also commercial, industrial and recreational areas, such that residents would not need to travel between the new towns and the city centre for work and leisure. To this end, a few industrial estates, such as Tai Po Industrial Estate and Yuen Long Industrial Estate, were built to provide work opportunities for the residents in the nearby new towns. Although the government successfully turned most of the new towns's town centres into vibrant commercial and cultural centres in their areas, the overall objective of self-reliance for the new towns failed, since most residents still had their jobs in Hong Kong Island and Kowloon; the objective became impossible to accomplish when most of Hong Kong's secondary sector industries had moved to mainland China.

== History ==
The British government had developed new towns in the United Kingdom to help relocate displaced populations after the Second World War. This experience influenced the colonial Hong Kong government's development of new towns in Hong Kong.

=== Satellite towns ===
Before the 1950s, most of the population in Hong Kong lived in Hong Kong's urban area, namely the central and western parts of the Kowloon Peninsula and the northern coast of Hong Kong Island. After the Second World War, however, the population boomed. The drastic growth was due to prolonged political unrest in Mainland China, which brought a large number of refugees to Hong Kong from the 1950s to the early 1970s and led to the rapid advance of Hong Kong's economy from the 1970s to the early 1990s. The government in the 1950s originally had no plans to deal with the problem of housing the increasing population, until the Shek Kip Mei Fire in 1953 destroyed the homes of 58,203 people in a shanty town. The government, for the first time, built public housing to accommodate the victims and found a change in housing policy essential. On the one hand, the government began to provide public housing, and on the other hand it proposed to develop “satellite towns” in undeveloped areas in order to make more lands available for the increasing housing need. At first, it identified Tsuen Wan and Kwai Chung as sites for the first satellite towns, but it then found that Kwun Tong, located in then-underdeveloped eastern Kowloon, would be attractive to people living in the slums of nearby Ngau Tau Kok. Thus, in the late 1950s, Kwun Tong became the first developed satellite town. Around the same time, the government also began to develop Tsuen Wan as a satellite town. In 1967, using a similar concept on a smaller scale, it also built Wah Fu Estate, which lay to the west of Aberdeen in Pok Fu Lam, in a remote corner on the southern side of Hong Kong Island.

=== New towns ===
In the late 1960s and the 1970s, another stage of new-town developments was launched and the term "new town" was officially adopted. As most flat lands in Kowloon and Hong Kong Island had already been developed, the government proposed to build new towns in New Territories, a largely rural area at that time. Kwun Tong, as the first satellite town, was not considered as a new town, as it was part of Kowloon and regarded by the government as part of the urban area. The first phase of new town development was unveiled in 1973, including Tsuen Wan New Town, which as a satellite town was not brought to full-scale development, and also Sha Tin New Town and Tuen Mun New Town. These new towns were intended to accommodate a few hundred thousand people each. For example, according to the first plan in 1961, the government planned to accommodate 360,000 people in Sha Tin once the entire new town had been built; the estimated population in Sha Tin rose to 500,000 in the planning of the early 1970s. In the corresponding areas, land was reclaimed to create new space for some of the new towns. These newly developed towns, maturing in the 1980s, provided new homes to more than 1 million Hong Kong people.

The first phase having succeeded, Hong Kong government proposed later in the 1970s to build New Towns in other areas as well. As part of this second phase, the development of Tai Po New Town, Yuen Long New Town and Fanling-Sheung Shui New Town began in 1976, 1977 and 1978 respectively; the extension of the Tsuen Wan New Town to Tsing Yi Town also began in the mid-1970s, and was regarded as part of the second phase of new-town development. The third phase of new-town development was proposed in the 1980s, including Tseung Kwan O New Town, Tin Shui Wai New Town and Ma On Shan, the last of which was officially considered as an extension of Sha Tin New Town. The fourth phase of new-town development, so far the last, commenced in 1996 and developed North Lantau New Town (only Tung Chung was developed, although originally the plan included the area near Tai Ho Wan), as a supporting town for the then-newly constructed airport in Chek Lap Kok. At present, there are nine new towns in all.

New Town development slowed in the 2000s, on account of unexpectedly slow population growth. Indeed, even the development of North Lantau New Town was sluggish: the population of North Lantau New Town was just 80,000 in early 2010s, less than half of the 200,000 originally planned. No additional new towns were established in the 2000s and early 2010s, and new-town development was restricted to further development of the ones already developed. In response to excess housing demand since the late 2000s, however, which resulted in extremely high housing prices and rents as well as very long queues in pending for public housing, government considered to add to the number of new towns again. In the early 2010s, the government proposed to build new towns in Hung Shui Kiu, Kwu Tung, North Fanling and Ping Che-Ta Kwu Ling. The proposals are matters of heated public debate; if the proposals are adopted, construction work is expected to begin in the mid-2010s, and its first phase to end in the early 2020s.

== Urban planning ==
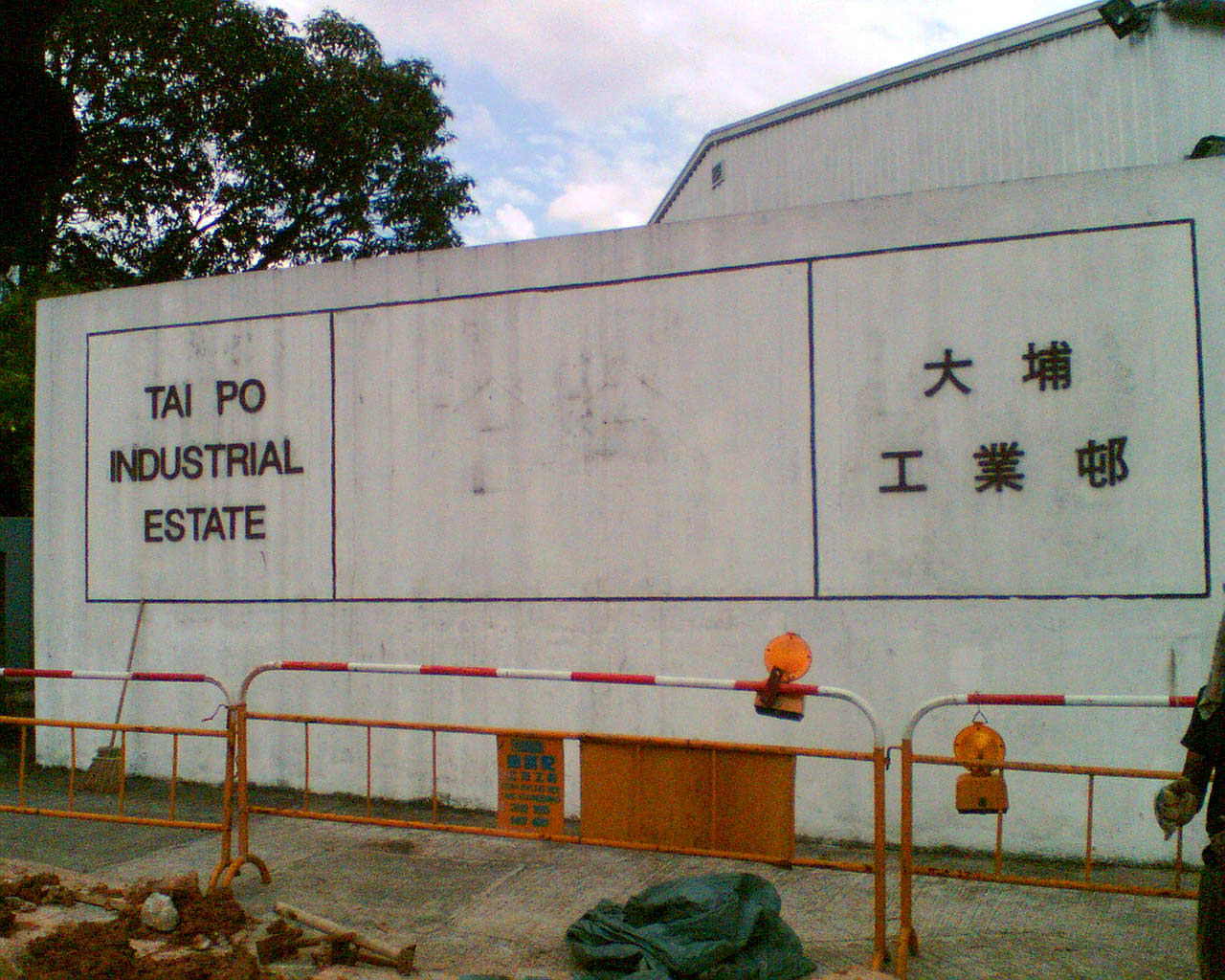
Tai Po Industrial Estate

The planning of the new towns was, in colonial history, the first major attempt at horizontal coordination among government departments. Regarding it as a cornerstone of Hong Kong social policy, the colonial government aimed to alleviate urban overpopulation and improve quality of life for ordinary citizens. It planned all new towns carefully, with the objective that the new towns should be self-reliant. Besides residential areas, then, the government included commercial, industrial and recreational areas in the planning of the new towns in the first two phases, such that the new towns could provide their residents with enough job opportunities. The attempt, if successful, could minimise the need for transportation between the new towns and the city centre, lowering both residents’ travel expenditures and the burden on the transportation system. For this reason, the government planned industrial areas near all the new towns it planned before the 1980s:

- Sha Tin New Town: Fo Tan and Shek Mun;
- Tuen Mun New Town: Tuen Mun Industrial Area 屯門工業區, west of the Tuen Mun River, north of Wong Chu Road, east of Shan King Estate and south of Tai Hing Gardens;
- Tsuen Wan New Town: Chai Wan Kok Industrial Area 柴灣角工業區, Texaco Industrial Area 德士古工業區 and Kwai Chung;
- Fanling-Sheung Shui New Town: On Lok Tsuen Industrial Area 安樂村工業區;
- Tai Po New Town: Tai Po Industrial Estate 大埔工業邨;
- Yuen Long New Town: Yuen Long Industrial Estate 元朗工業邨.

The idea did not work, however. In the 1980s, when the new towns were developing at their highest pace, secondary sector industries in Hong Kong began moving to the Mainland China, where costs were much lower, and Hong Kong gradually emerged instead as a commercial and financial centre in the region. In consequence, most of the work opportunities remained in the urban areas, forcing residents in the new towns to travel between the new towns and the city centre every day. From the 1990s on, when Hong Kong had almost no more substantial secondary industries, the industrial buildings were repurposed into offices and warehouses, or even rebuilt as residential apartments. The new towns planned in the 1980s and 1990s had either no more industrial areas (e.g. Tin Shui Wai New Town and Tung Chung), or industrial areas with only high-value-adding industries allowed (e.g. Tseung Kwan O Industrial Estate 將軍澳工業邨).

=== Town centres ===
Typically, a new town was planned and developed around a town centre, which was the town's business, cultural and traffic hub. For example, in the town centres of Tuen Mun New Town and Sha Tin New Town, one can find shopping centres, public libraries, theatres, government offices, parks, and bus terminuses. Any new town with a railway station had its town centre planned near it. Tsuen Wan New Town was distinctive in having more than one town centre, situated around Tsuen Wan station and Kwai Fong station, and later also around Tsing Yi station after Tsuen Wan New Town had expanded to Tsing Yi. With the exception of Tin Shui Wai New Town, the only new town without a clear town centre, the new towns’ town centres became vibrant business and cultural hubs of their areas.

=== Transport ===
Transport is vital for the new towns, and thus is planned with care. Before the development of new towns, most areas in the New Territories were poorly connected; new development required both roads and public transport.

To ease the traffic between the new towns and the urban area, new roads and highways were built. For example, Tuen Mun Road and Tolo Highway were two principal highways built in the late 1970s and early 1980s to connect the new towns in western New Territories and eastern New Territories to New Kowloon; tunnels (e.g. Lion Rock Tunnel and Tate's Cairn Tunnel) and bridges (e.g. Tsing Yi Bridge) were also built to shorten travel times.

Public transport was also developed. Many new towns were planned with new railway lines (e.g. MTR stations in Tsuen Wan New Town, Tseung Kwan O New Town, Tung Chung and the Ma On Shan Rail for Ma On Shan). The Kowloon–Canton Railway was electrified in the early 1980s in order to provide convenient transport to the new towns at Fanling-Sheung Shui, Tai Po and Sha Tin.

New towns in the north-western New Territories were connected by Light Rail Transit, although at the time they remained the only new towns without direct railway service to the urban areas. Because there was no railway transport, and Tuen Mun Road and Castle Peak Road were the only links to Kowloon, the traffic between these new towns and the urban area was highly congested, prompting the government to study new road and rail links. The situation improved when Tai Lam Tunnel opened in 1998. These new towns in the north-western New Territories were finally connected to urban areas with direct railway service when KCR West Rail (now part of the Tuen Ma Line) opened in 2003.

=== Housing ===
New towns’ residential areas have both private and public housing.

=== Land reclamation ===
When new towns were first developed, land reclamation was an important way of gaining land to build on. Large areas were gained by land reclamations in Sha Tin, Tsuen Wan, Tuen Mun, Tai Po, Tsing Yi, Ma On Shan, Tin Shui Wai, Tseung Kwan O and Tung Chung – 7 of 9 new towns, with Fanling-Sheung Shui New Town and Yuen Long New Town being the only exceptions.

== Established new towns ==
New Towns	Time of development	2012 population	Planned population	Area (km^{2})	Population density (people/km^{2})	Administrative division
Tsuen Wan New Town (including Tsuen Wan, Kwai Chung, and Tsing Yi)	1959 (construction and planning begins, as satellite town); 1961 (formal, full scale development as new town)	856,000	845,000	24.00	32,300	Tsuen Wan District and Kwai Tsing District
Sha Tin New Town (including Sha Tin, Tai Wai, and Ma On Shan)	1973	636,000	735,000	35.87	18,000	Sha Tin District
Tuen Mun New Town	1973	486,000	649,000	19.00	25,710	Tuen Mun District
Tai Po New Town	1976	265,000	347,000	12.70	22,200	Tai Po District
Yuen Long New Town	1977	148,000	196,000	11.70	18,000	Yuen Long District
Fanling-Sheung Shui New Town	1978	255,000	291,000	7.80	31,300	North District
Tseung Kwan O New Town (including Hang Hau, Po Lam, LOHAS Park, Tiu Keng Leng, and Tseung Kwan O)	1982	372,000	450,000	10.05	34,800	Sai Kung District
Tin Shui Wai New Town	1987	288,000	306,000	4.30	63,000	Yuen Long District
North Lantau New Town (Currently only includes Tung Chung)	1996	78,000	220,000	8.30	9,700	Islands District

== Planned new towns ==
- Yuen Long District
  - Hung Shui Kiu New Town (Near Tin Shui Wai New Town and Yuen Long New Town)
- North District (North East New Territories New Development Areas Planning)
  - Kwu Tung North New Town
  - North Fanling New Town (Extension of Fanling-Sheung Shui New Town)
  - Ping Che-Ta Kwu Ling New Town (Suspended)
- Islands District
  - North Lantau New Town (Tung Chung Development Plan Phase 3 and Phase 4)

== Planned new districts in established new towns ==
- Yuen Long District
  - Yuen Long South (Yuen Long New Town)
  - Kam Tin South (Yuen Long New Town)
- Tai Po District
  - Pak Shek Kok (Tai Po New Town)
- Sai Kung District
  - Tseung Kwan O South and Pak Shing Kok (Tseung Kwan O New Town)
  - Anderson Road Quarry Development Plan (Tseung Kwan O New Town)
- Sha Tin District
  - Shui Chuen O (Sha Tin New Town)
  - Kau To Hill (Sha Tin New Town)
  - Whitehead and Lok Wo Sha (Sha Tin New Town)
- Tuen Mun District
  - So Kwun Wat (Tuen Mun New Town)
- Others
  - Lok Ma Chau Loop (Yuen Long New Town and Fanling-Sheung Shui New Town)
