= Tolo Highway =

Road in Hong Kong

Tolo Highway
- Part of Route 9
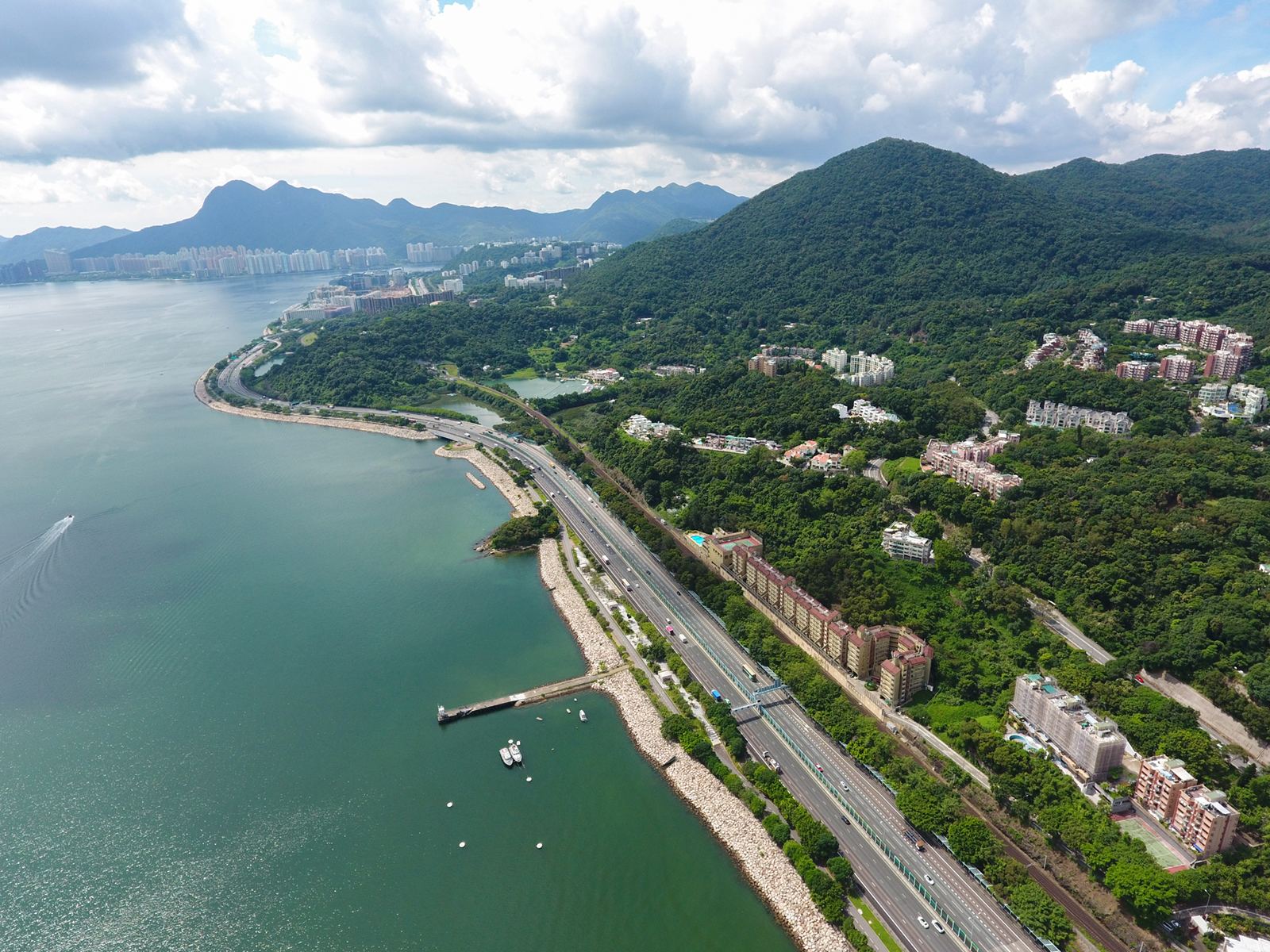
- Aerial view of Tolo Highway at Tai Po Kau

Route information
- Maintained by Highways Department
- Length: 11.3 km (7.0 mi)
- Existed: 1987–present

Major junctions
- East end: Sha Tin (near Ma Liu Shui)
- 8 in total; Route 2 at Ma Liu Shui
- West end: Tai Po (Tai Hang San Wai)

Location
- Country: China
- Special administrative region: Hong Kong

Highway system
- Transport in Hong Kong; Routes; Roads and Streets

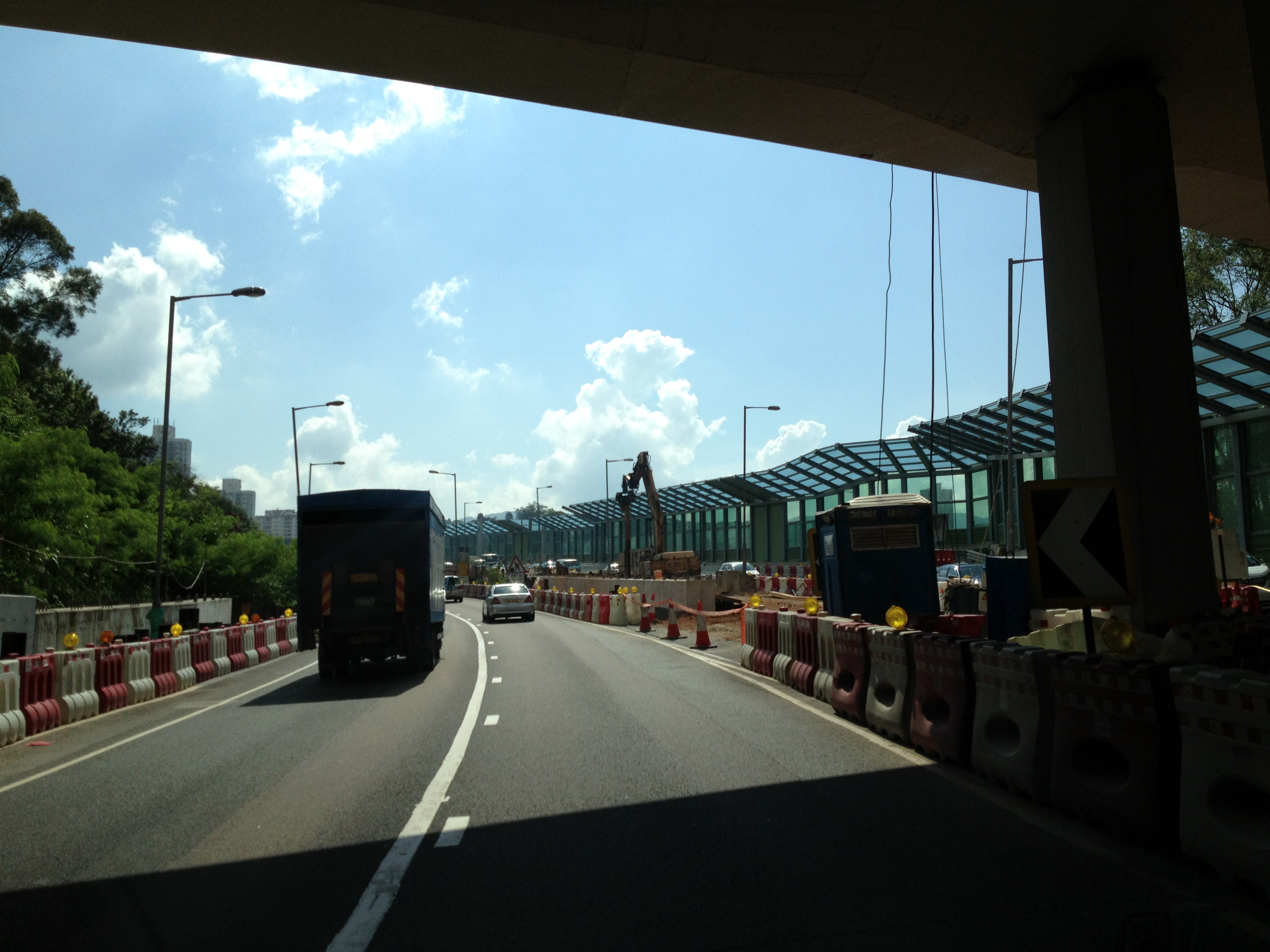
Tolo Highway

Tolo Highway (Chinese: 吐露港公路; Jyutping: tou3 lou6 gong2 gung1 lou6) is a major expressway on Route 9 in Hong Kong. It connects the new towns of Sha Tin and Tai Po in the eastern New Territories, forming part of the New Territories Circular Road.

The highway serves as a vital commuting artery connecting the northern New Territories with urban Kowloon

The 11.3-kilometre (7.0 mi) highway, constructed in three stages between 1985 and 1987, was so named as it skirts the western edge of Tolo Harbour.

== Route description ==
The highway diverges from Tai Po Road near Sha Tin Racecourse. The following 7.3 kilometres (4.5 mi) of the road, running alongside the East Rail line, was built on an embankment on the west coast of Tolo Harbour towards Yuen Chau Tsai (Island House), which marks the eastern end of the Tai Po New Town. Construction began in March 1999 to expand the section to a dual four-lane carriageway and was finished in August 2003. The section below the campus of the Chinese University of Hong Kong has since become landlocked owing to the reclamation for the Hong Kong Science Park.

The next section, 5 km (3.1 mi) long, bypasses Tai Po on the hills to its south, over Wun Yiu, Ma Wo and Pun Chun Yuen. As the alignment crosses a number of remote ravines far away from existing roads, four bridges along the bypass had to be incrementally launched. This was the first instance of such bridge building technique being adopted in Hong Kong. Originally a dual 3-lane carriageway, this section was upgraded to a dual four-lane carriageway between August 2009 and March 2014. The speed limit for the section was temporarily reduced to 80 km/h (50 mph) from 100 km/h (62 mph) during the widening works.

The road ends at Lam Kam Road Interchange, where it connects to Fanling Highway via a viaduct and interchanges with Lam Kam Road, Tai Po Road and Tai Wo Service Road West.

== Interchanges and Junctions ==
There are 6 junctions along Tolo Highway: Sha Tin Racecourse, Ma Liu Shui, Science Park, Island House, Tat Wan Road and Tai Po Tai Wo Road.

Tolo Highway
District	Location	km	Interchange name	Exit	Destinations	Notes
Sha Tin	Fo Tan	8.9			Tai Po Road – Sha Tin – Sha Tin, Kowloon	Southern terminus; Route 9 continues
Sha Tin	Fo Tan	8.9		3	Sha Tin Racecourse	Northbound exit and southbound entrance from and to Tai Po Road – Sha Tin
Sha Tin	Ma Liu Shui	10.1	Ma Liu Shui Interchange	3A	Route 2 ( Tate's Cairn Highway) – Ma On Shan, Kowloon East	Southbound exit and northbound entrance only
Sha Tin	Ma Liu Shui	10.1	Ma Liu Shui Interchange	4	Chak Cheung Street / Science Park Road – Ma Liu Shui, University, Science Park	Southbound entrance from Sui Cheung Street
Tai Po	Pak Shek Kok	13.4		4A	Chong San Road – Pak Shek Kok, Science Park	No northbound exit
Tai Po	Tai Po	16.0	Island House Interchange	5	Tai Po Road – Yuen Chau Tsai – Tai Po Market; Yuen Shin Road – Tai Po Central, Industrial Estate	
Tai Po	Tai Po	17.0		5A	Tat Wan Road – Tai Po (South)	Northbound exit and southbound entrance only
Tai Po	Tai Wo	19.5	Tai Po North Interchange	6	Tai Po Tai Wo Road – Tai Po (North)	
Tai Po	Tai Hang	20.2	Lam Kam Road Interchange	7	Lam Kam Road / Tai Wo Service Road West – Shek Kong, Hong Lok Yuen	
Tai Po	Tai Hang	20.2	Lam Kam Road Interchange		Fanling Highway – Fanling, Sheung Shui, Yuen Long	Northern terminus; Route 9 continues
1.000 mi = 1.609 km; 1.000 km = 0.621 mi: Incomplete access

== See also ==
- List of expressways in Hong Kong
- Route 9 (Hong Kong)
- Tolo Harbour

Preceded by Tai Po Road – Sha Tin	Hong Kong Route 9 Tolo Highway	Succeeded by Fanling Highway
