= Science Park station =

Science Park station may refer to:

- Science Park station (MBTA), an elevated light rail station on the MBTA Green Line in Boston, Massachusetts
- Pak Shek Kok station, also previously known as Science Park station, a proposed MTR (mass transit) station in Pak Shek Kok, Hong Kong
- Science Park station (Shenzhen Metro), a metro station on Line 6 of the Shenzhen Metro
- Science Park station (Wuhan Metro), a metro station on Line 5 of the Wuhan Metro
