= Ma Liu Shui =

Ma Liu Shui 馬料水
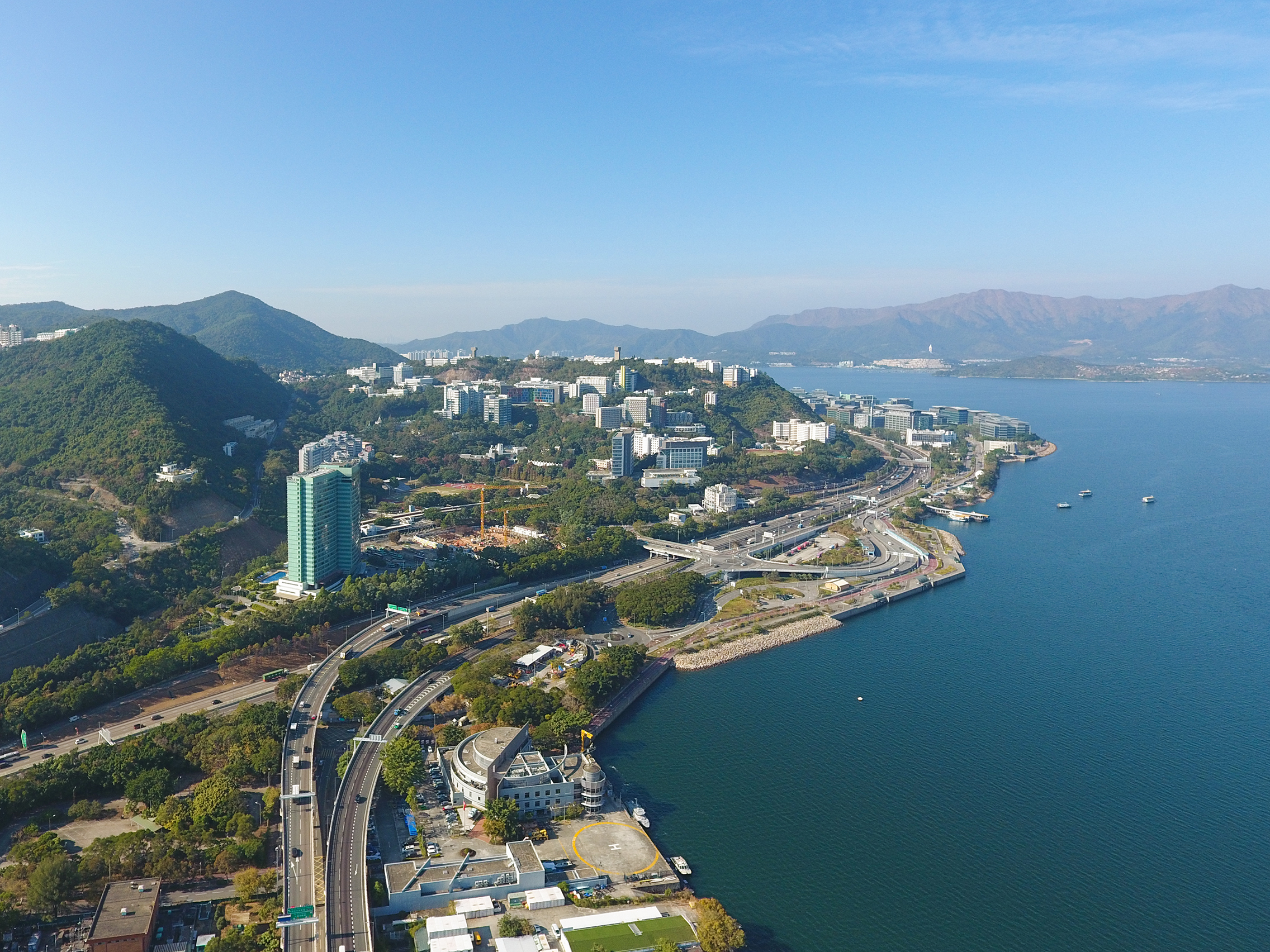
- Ma Liu Shui
- Interactive map of Ma Liu Shui
- Coordinates: 22°24′59″N 114°12′32″E
- Country: Hong Kong
- Region: New Territories
- District: Sha Tin District
- District Council: Sha Tin

Ma Liu Shui
- Traditional Chinese: 馬料水
Transcriptions
Yue: Cantonese
- Yale Romanization: Máh liuh séui
- Jyutping: Maa^{5} liu^{6} seoi^{2}

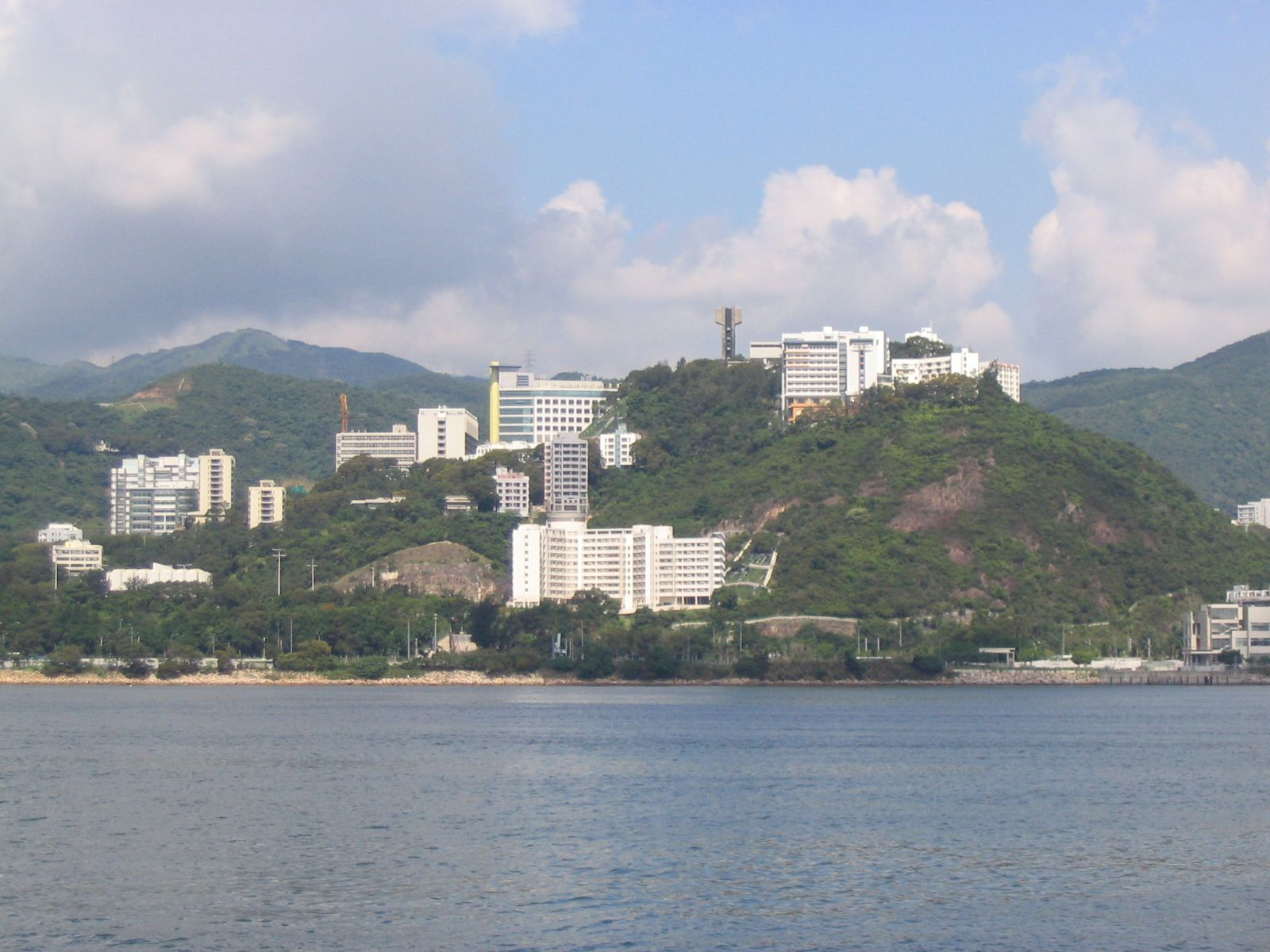
The Chinese University of Hong Kong in Ma Liu Shui.

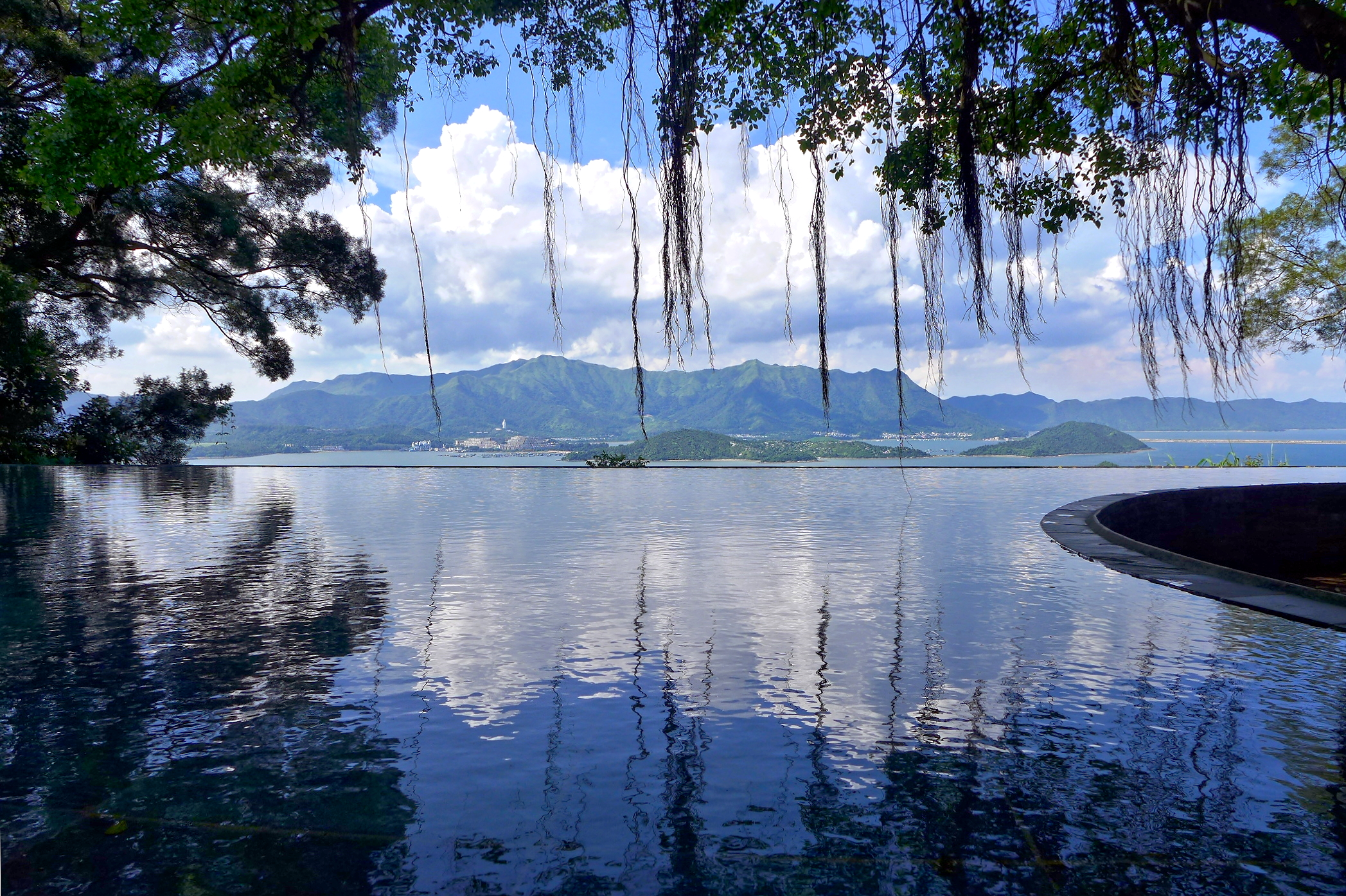
Infinity edge pool of the Pavilion of Harmony, inside the Chinese University of Hong Kong.

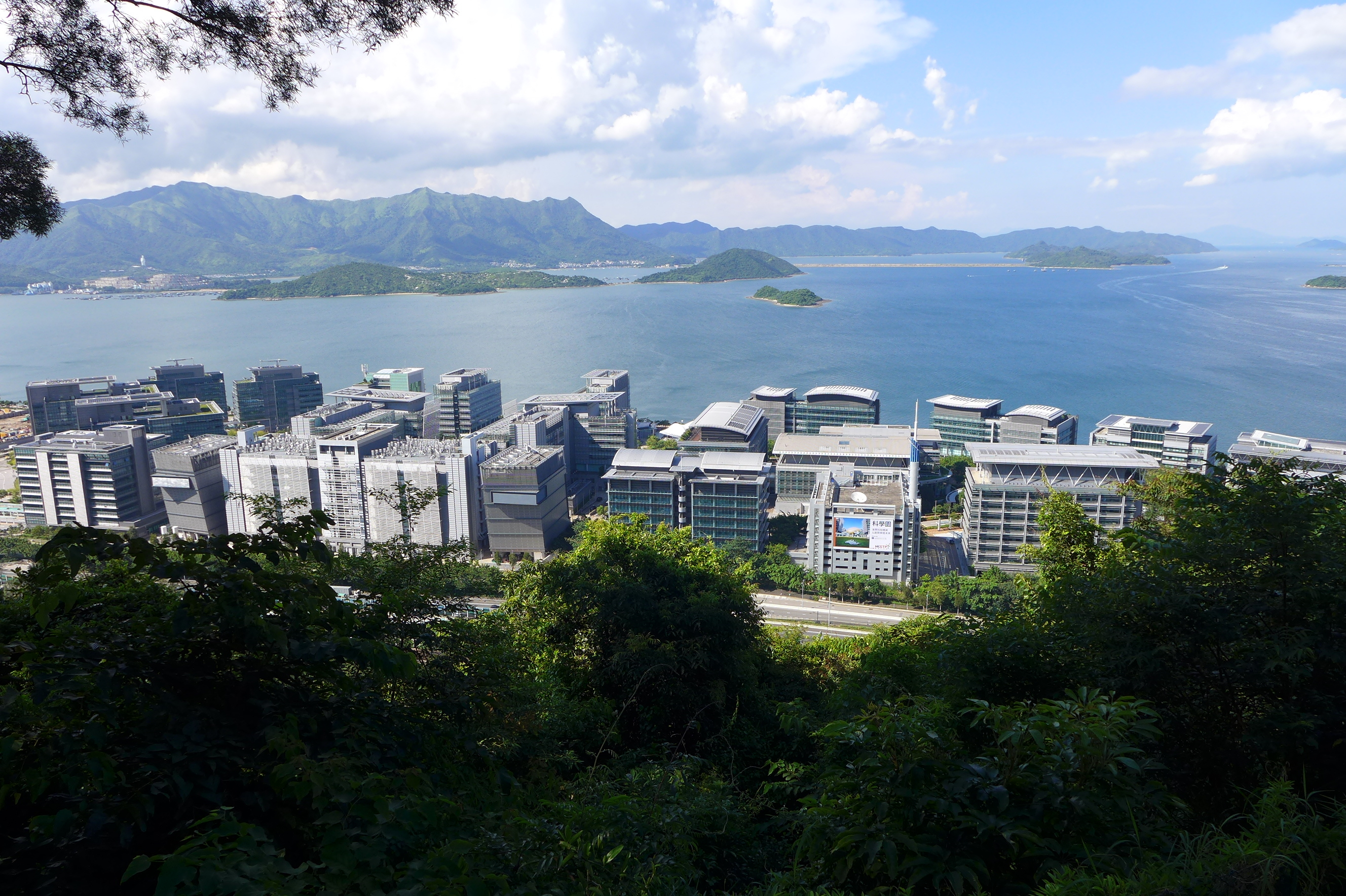
The Hong Kong Science Park facing Tolo Harbour, in Pak Shek Kok, next to Ma Liu Shui.

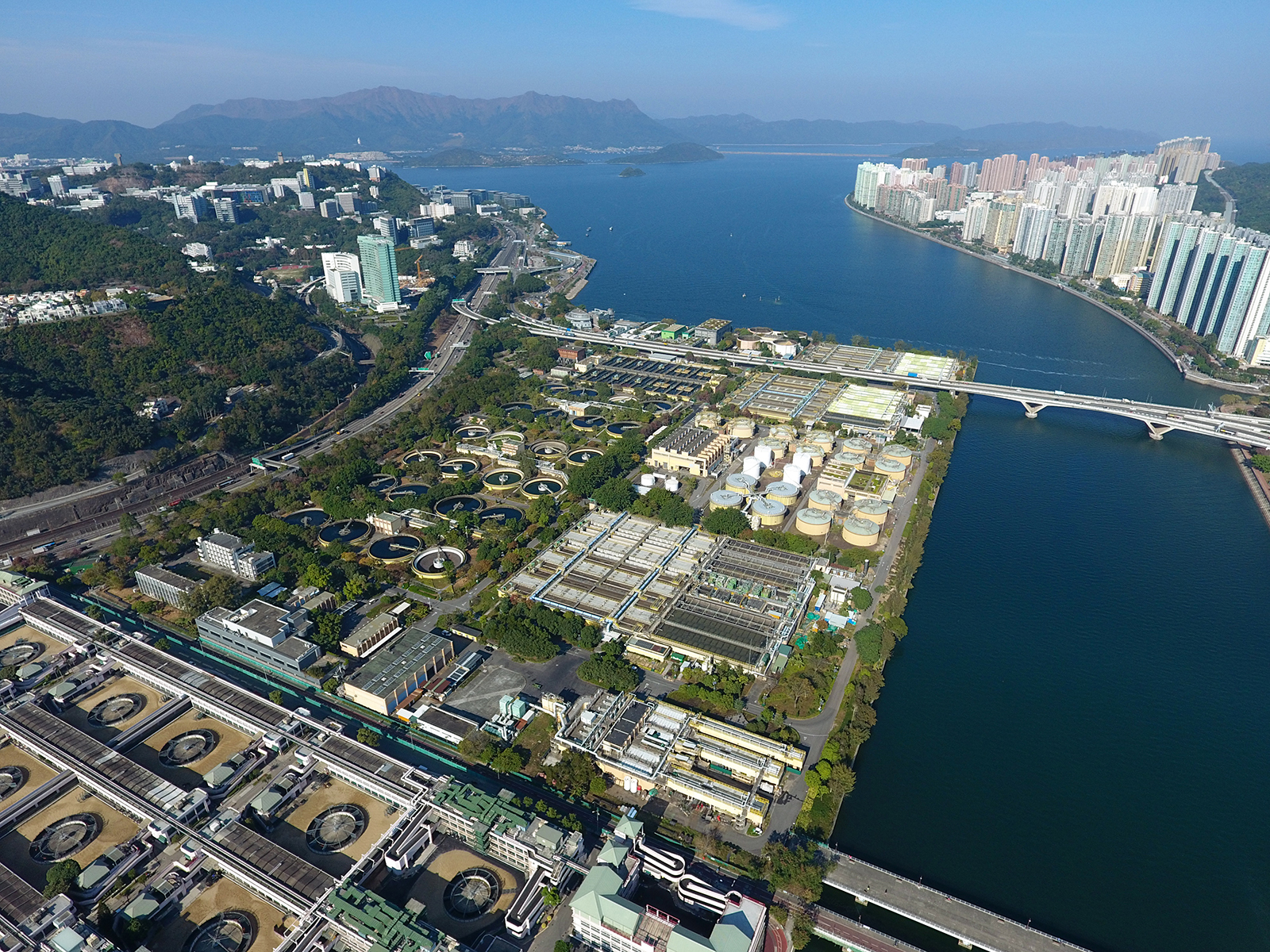
Sha Tin Sewage Treatment Works.

Ma Liu Shui is an area in Sha Tin District, in the New Territories, Hong Kong.

The area faces Tide Cove (Sha Tin Hoi) and Tolo Harbour. The Chinese University of Hong Kong and the Hong Kong Science Park are located in Ma Liu Shui.

== Name etymology ==
Ma Liu Shui is directly and phonetically translated to English from "馬料水" in Cantonese. It literally means "the water that the horses feed on". It was originally named "馬嫽水", with the same phonetic translation, literally meaning "the water that the horses play in".

According to legend of Hakkas, hundreds of years ago when the government of Bao'an County was riding his horse around towns to announce the collection of rice and crops, the horse stopped in the area and went down the hills to drink and play in the lake. It would not leave and looked as if it were at home. The Hakka villagers observed this strange phenomena and cleverly suggested that the horse may have originated from there, therefore the sense of belonging. They named the area "馬嫽水", which translates to "Ma Liu Shui" because of this.

== History ==
Ma Liu Shui was a barren land inhabited by Hakkas until in 1956, Chung Chi College was allowed 10 acres of land in Ma Liu Shui to build their campus upon, alongside opened a KCR station also named 'Ma Liu Shui station' for people's convenience.

In 1963, Chinese University of Hong Kong was established, setting its campus in Ma Liu Shui. Chung Chi College was therefore expanded, the original KCR station renamed as University station. Ma Liu Shui Village was relocated to its present site in between Lung Yeuk Tau and Kwan Tei, belonging to the Rural committee of Fanling district, and was renamed 'Ma Liu Shui San Tsuen', literally meaning the new village of Ma Liu Shui. In the same year, Yucca de Lac had opened near the Chinese University of Hong Kong.

In between 1969 and 1973, the various academic buildings of CUHK and New Asia and United College moved into their new premises next to Chung Chi College.

During the 1980s, University station (MTR) became a main transit station for locals because of the redevelopment of the new town in Ma On Shan. The opening of Ma On Shan line in December 2004 helped dilute the crowds and its importance.

In 2005, Yucca de Lac was closed down.

Another familiar landmark is the ferry dock in Ma Liu Shui. It has the only ferry service connecting the public to Tung Ping Chau, at the same time serving as the gathering spot for sightseeing trips to the coasts of New Territories, which explains its popularity on the weekends. It also had had a hovercraft service crossing the borders to Dameisha Beach, Shenzhen in the early 1980s, which had been closed down.

== Landmarks ==
- Chinese University of Hong Kong
  - Jockey Club Museum of Climate Change
- Hong Kong Science Park
- Hyatt Regency Hong Kong, Sha Tin
- Yucca de Lac, a famous high-class western restaurant was located in Ma Liu Shui. It closed in October 2005.
- Sha Tin Sewage Treatment Works
- Ferry to Tung Ping Chau Geopark

== Education ==
Ma Liu Shui is in Primary One Admission (POA) School Net 91. Within the school net are multiple aided schools (operated independently but funded with government money); no government schools are in this net.

Tertiary institutions in Ma Liu Shui:

- Morningside College

== Restaurants ==
Restaurants in Ma Liu Shui spread mainly in 2 area: up on the hill inside the Chinese University of Hong Kong (CUHK) campus, and the Science Park along to coast. In between these 2 areas, tourist may also find a dining option in the Kerry Lake Egret Nature Park (白鷺湖互動中心).

A large group of small restaurants and canteens can also be found inside the Chinese University of Hong Kong campus to serve both the students and staff. A Maxim fastfood can be found in the University Station, whereas a McCafe can be located in Shaw College. New Asia College campus has a Chinese dumpling restaurant. Newer colleges also has quite a number of new food stalls which offers ox tail soup, fish balls and sushi rolls.

A KFC is also available in Chung Chi College campus.

== Transport ==
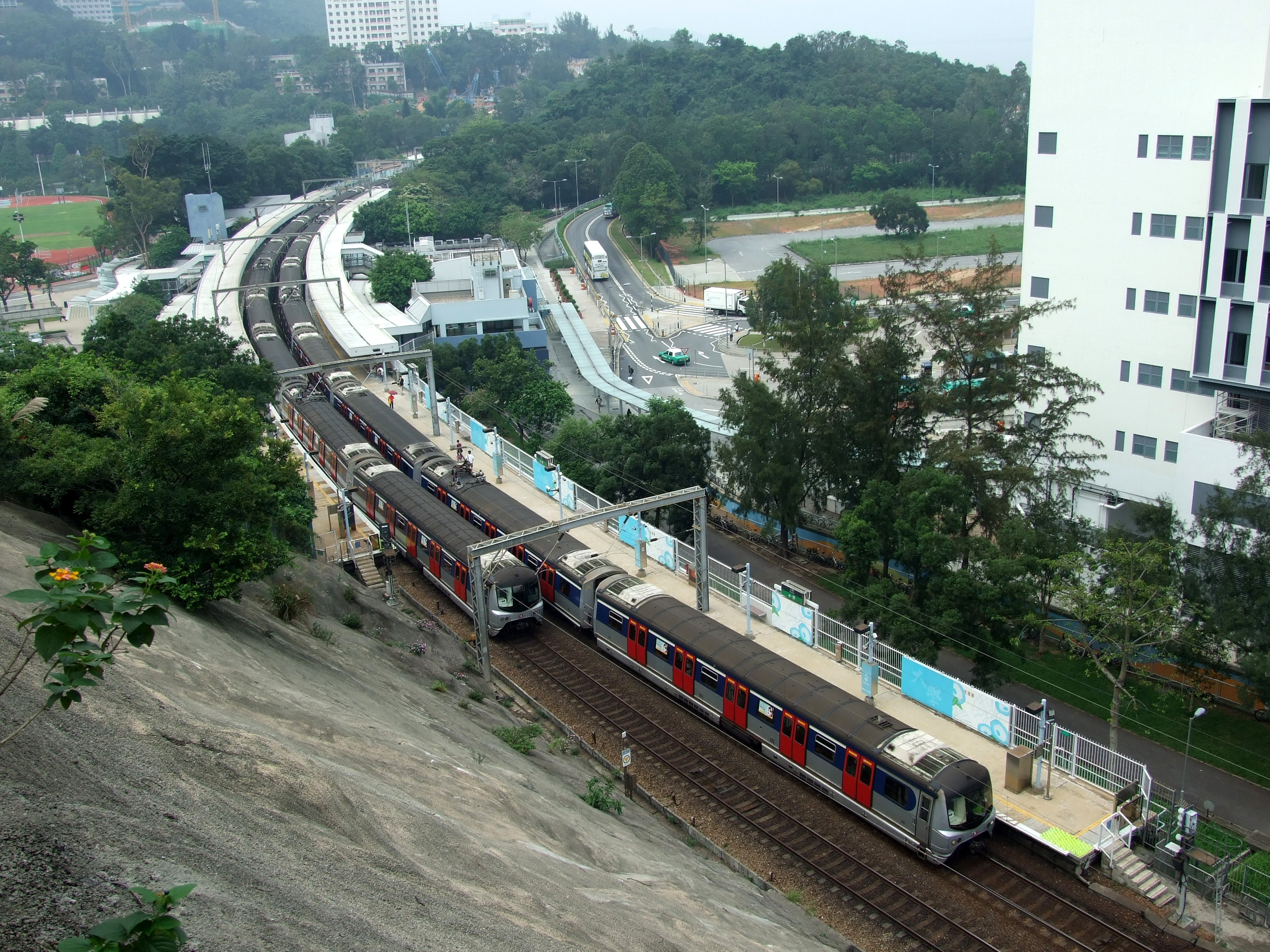
University station in 2010.

=== MTR ===
There is an East Rail line station in Ma Liu Shui just by the Chinese University of Hong Kong. The station was originally known as Ma Liu Shui Station, but was later renamed University station. This is also because the Chinese University of Hong Kong is more well-known than the name "Ma Liu Shui". The Cantonese phonetics also had significant similarities with Ma Niu Shui (馬尿水), prompting the successful lobby of its name change in 1967. The station sign was changed on 1 January 1967. The MTR plans to build another station called "Science Park" in the Ma Liu Shui area.

=== Ferry ===
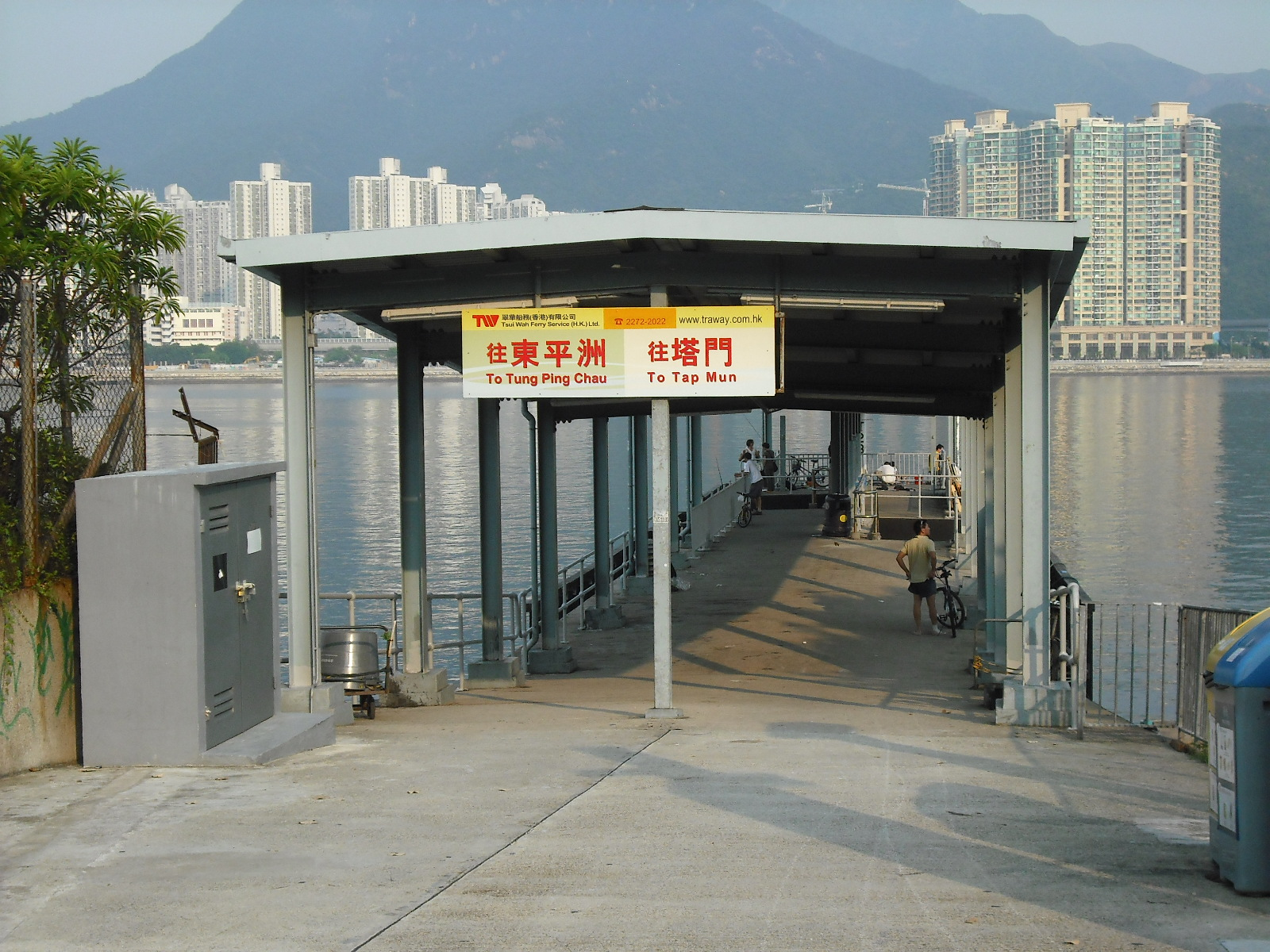
Ma Liu Shui ferry pier in 2009.

There is a ferry pier in Ma Liu Shui, from which regular ferry services run to remote areas including the islands of Tap Mun and Ping Chau in the northeast New Territories. The former ferry service to Wu Kai Sha has now been replaced by a bridge across the Shing Mun River Channel to the Ma On Shan area.

=== Bus ===
Next to the railway station, there is a bus terminus. There are several bus routes of the KMB and several routes of Green minibuses. Most of them go to the nearby Ma On Shan area.

The following KMB bus routes terminate at the University MTR Station bus terminus:

- 87K: Kam Ying Court, Ma On Shan ↔ University Station
- 87S: Kam Ying Court, Ma On Shan ↔ University Station
- 99R: Sai Kung ↔ University Station
- 272A: Pak Shek Kok ↔ University Station
- 272K: Hong Kong Science Park ↔ University Station
- 289K: Chevalier Garden, Ma On Shan ↔ University Station

Cancelled bus routes which formerly terminated at the University MTR Station Bus Terminus:

- 84K: Chevalier Garden, Ma On Shan ↔ University Station
- 287K: Ma On Shan Town Centre ↔ University Station

== See also ==
- Chinese University of Hong Kong
- Tai Po District
- Sha Tin
