= Cheung Shue Tan =

Village in Tai Po District, Hong Kong

Coordinates: 22.42611°N 114.20055°E

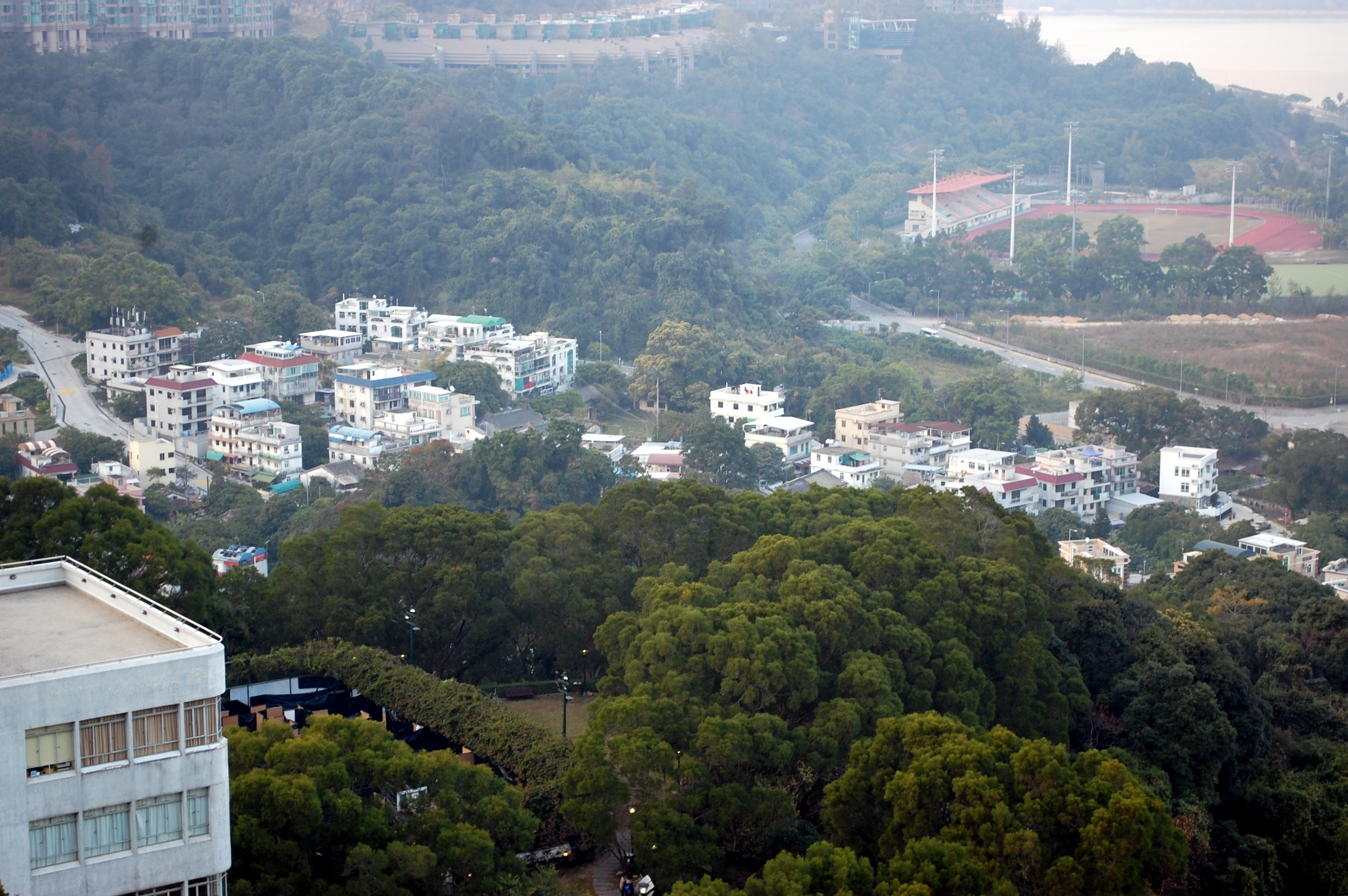
Cheung Shue Tan

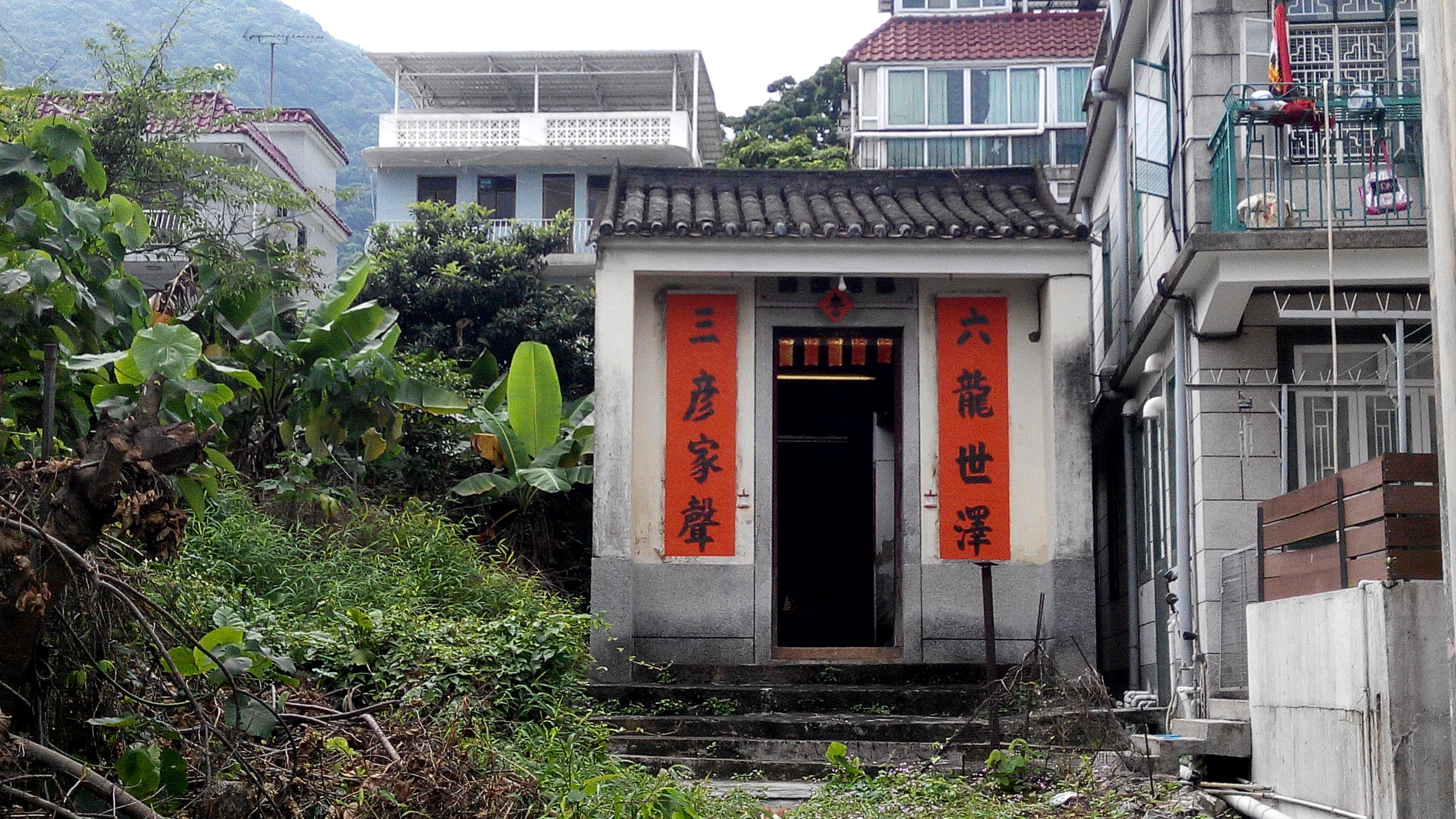
Wan Ancestral Hall in Cheung Shue Tan

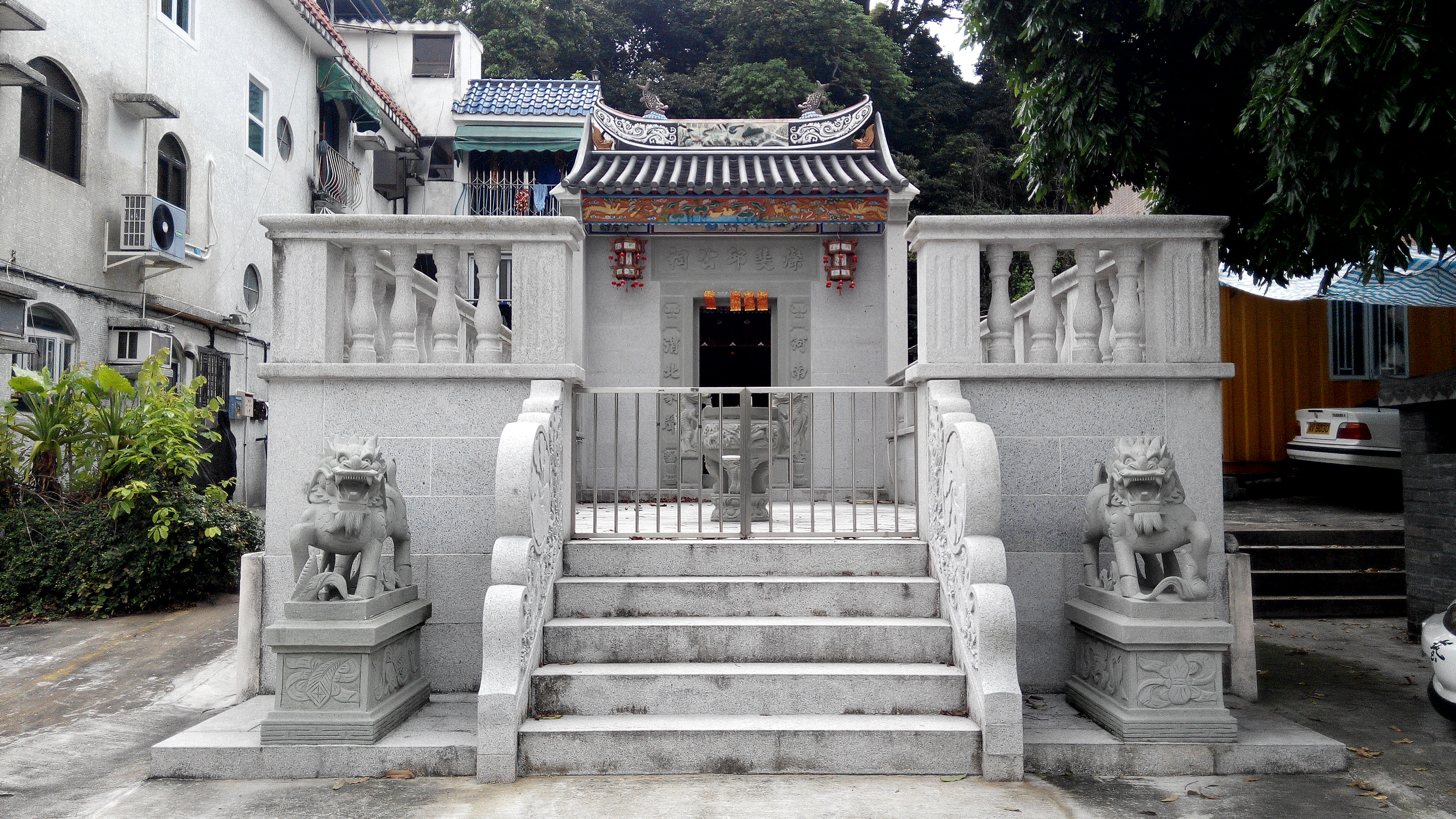
Yau Chan Fei Ancestral Hall in Cheung Shue Tan

Cheung Shue Tan (Chinese: 樟樹灘) is a village in Pak Shek Kok, Tai Po District, Hong Kong.

== Administration ==
Cheung Shue Tan is a recognized village under the New Territories Small House Policy.

== Features ==
The Kong Ancestral Hall, the Yau Chan Fei Ancestral Hall, the Wan Ancestral Hall and the Hip Tin Temple (樟樹灘村協天宮) in Cheung Shue Tan are listed as Grade III historic buildings.

== See also ==
- Pak Shek Kok
