= Yucca de Lac =

Restaurant in Hong Kong

Coordinates: 22.414142°N 114.206655°E

- Chinese: 雍雅山房
Transcriptions
Standard Mandarin
- Hanyu Pinyin: Yōng Yǎ Shānfáng
Yue: Cantonese
- Yale Romanization: yūng ngáh sāan fòhng
- Jyutping: jung1 ngaa5 saan1 fong4
- IPA: [jʊ́ŋ ŋa̬ː sáːn fɔ̏ːŋ]

Yucca de Lac is a high-end restaurant at the Peak Galleria in Hong Kong. The original restaurant was opened at Tai Po Road, Ma Liu Shui, in 1963 and closed on September 20, 2005. Located near the Chinese University of Hong Kong, it was famous for frequently serving as a scene for the black-and-white Cantonese films made in the 1960s.

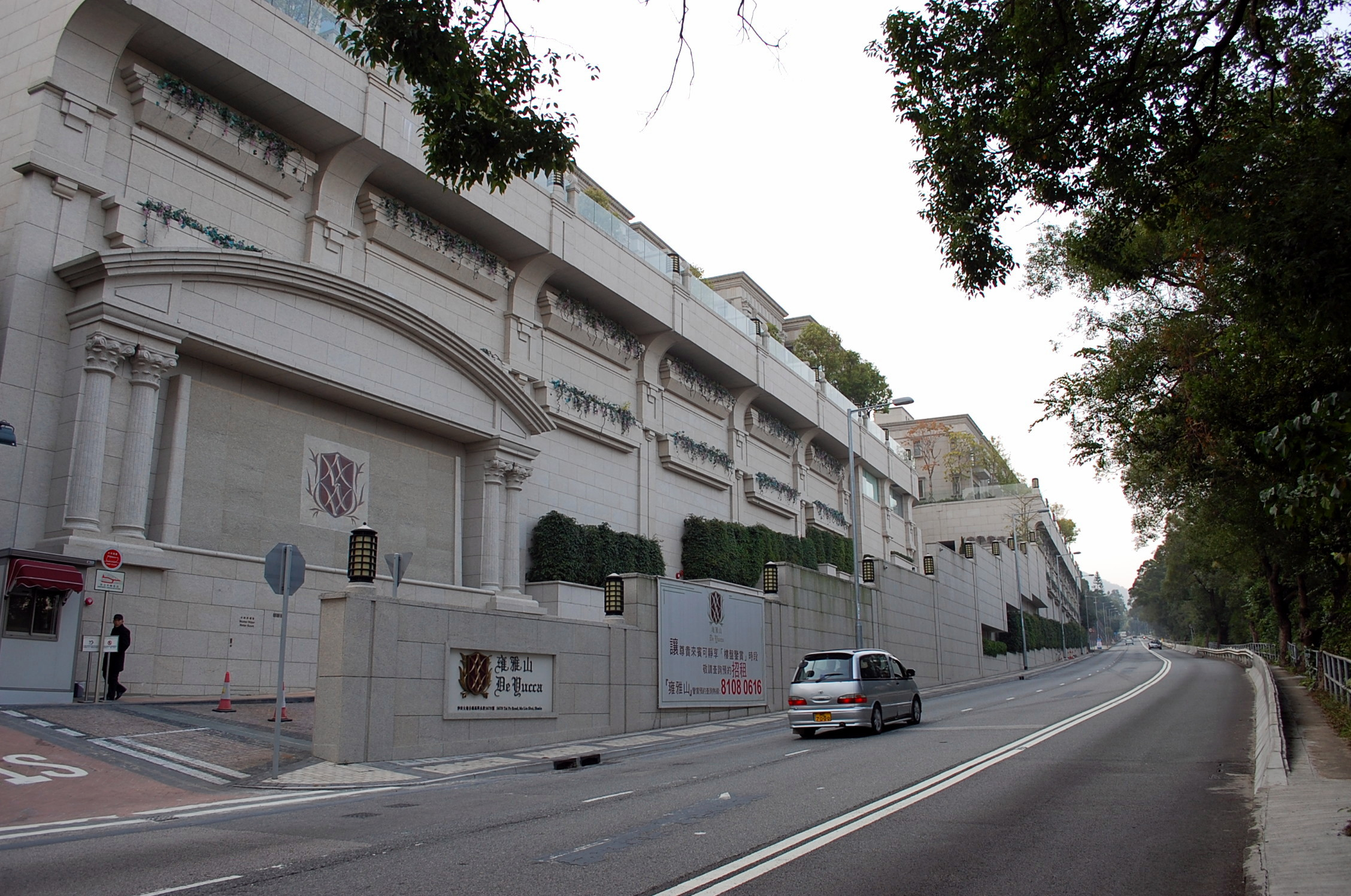
The luxury housing on the former restaurant lands

The site of the original restaurant was sold in 2005 to a local businessman at $380 million HKD for redevelopment as a real estate project. There were concerns from environmental groups that woodland on the site would not be preserved. Including the price of the land, developer Yucca Development invested over $1 billion in the 21-home project.

On March 26, 2012, the Fung Lum Restaurant Group opened a USA branch of the bar and restaurant in the Stanford Shopping Center in Palo Alto, California.

== See also ==
- Hong Kong tea culture
