= Pak Shek Kok station =

Proposed MTR station in the New Territories, Hong Kong

Pak Shek Kok 白石角
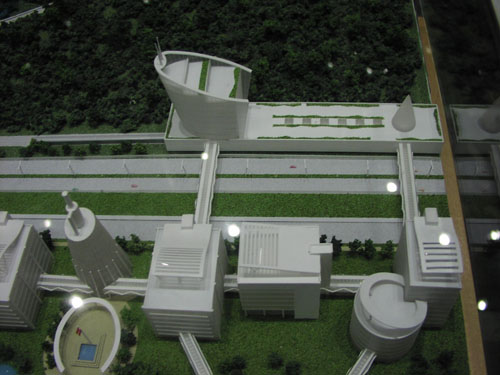
- The planning model of the station

General information
- Location: Pak Shek Kok; Tai Po District, Hong Kong
- Coordinates: 22°25′40″N 114°12′17″E
- System: Planned MTR rapid transit station
- Owner: KCR Corporation
- Operator: MTR Corporation
- Line: East Rail line (proposed)
- Platforms: 2 (2 side platforms)
- Tracks: 2

Construction
- Structure type: At-grade
- Accessible: yes

History
- Opening: 2033; 7 years' time

Services
Preceding station	MTR	Following station
Proposed
University towards Admiralty	East Rail line	Tai Po Market towards Lo Wu or Lok Ma Chau
Location
- Location within MTR

Pak Shek Kok station (Chinese: 白石角站) (previously also referred to as Science Park station (Chinese: 科學園站)) is a planned MTR station to be built in Pak Shek Kok, New Territories, Hong Kong. The station will be on the East Rail line between University and Tai Po Market stations, serving the Hong Kong Science Park and local residential population. It is scheduled to open in 2033.

A footbridge over Tolo Highway will link the station to Chong San Road.

The station will shorten travel distance and time between Science Park / Pak Shek Kok both north to the northern New Territories and south to Shatin and the urban areas. Currently, the 272K KMB bus route to University station is the only public transport north. Walking to University station from Science Park takes around 20 minutes.

Under revised plans, the MTR Corporation will apply its "Rail + Property" development model and build exclusively private residential property in the vicinity of the station, capturing the increase in value of the land due to the utility of the improved transport access. Previously, some of the development was to be public housing.

The station will be built partly on the site of the current Education University sports centre, with the government undertaking to build a replacement facility at Tung Tsz, close to the university's main campus near Tai Po.

== History ==
The station was first proposed as part of the overall Pak Shek Kok Development, whose corresponding Environmental Impact Assessment Report was approved by the Environmental Protection Department in 1998.

In 2021, Chief Executive Carrie Lam invited the MTR Corporation for the construction of a station at the site of the Hong Kong Education University's sports centre. In the Chief Executive's 2022 policy address, it was stated that the station would be commissioned by 2033.
