= Pak Shek Kok =

Place in Tai Po District in Hong Kong

Coordinates: 22°25′37.87″N 114°12′11.99″E

- Chinese: 白石角
Transcriptions
Standard Mandarin
- Hanyu Pinyin: Báishíjiǎo
Yue: Cantonese
- Jyutping: baak6 sek6 gok3

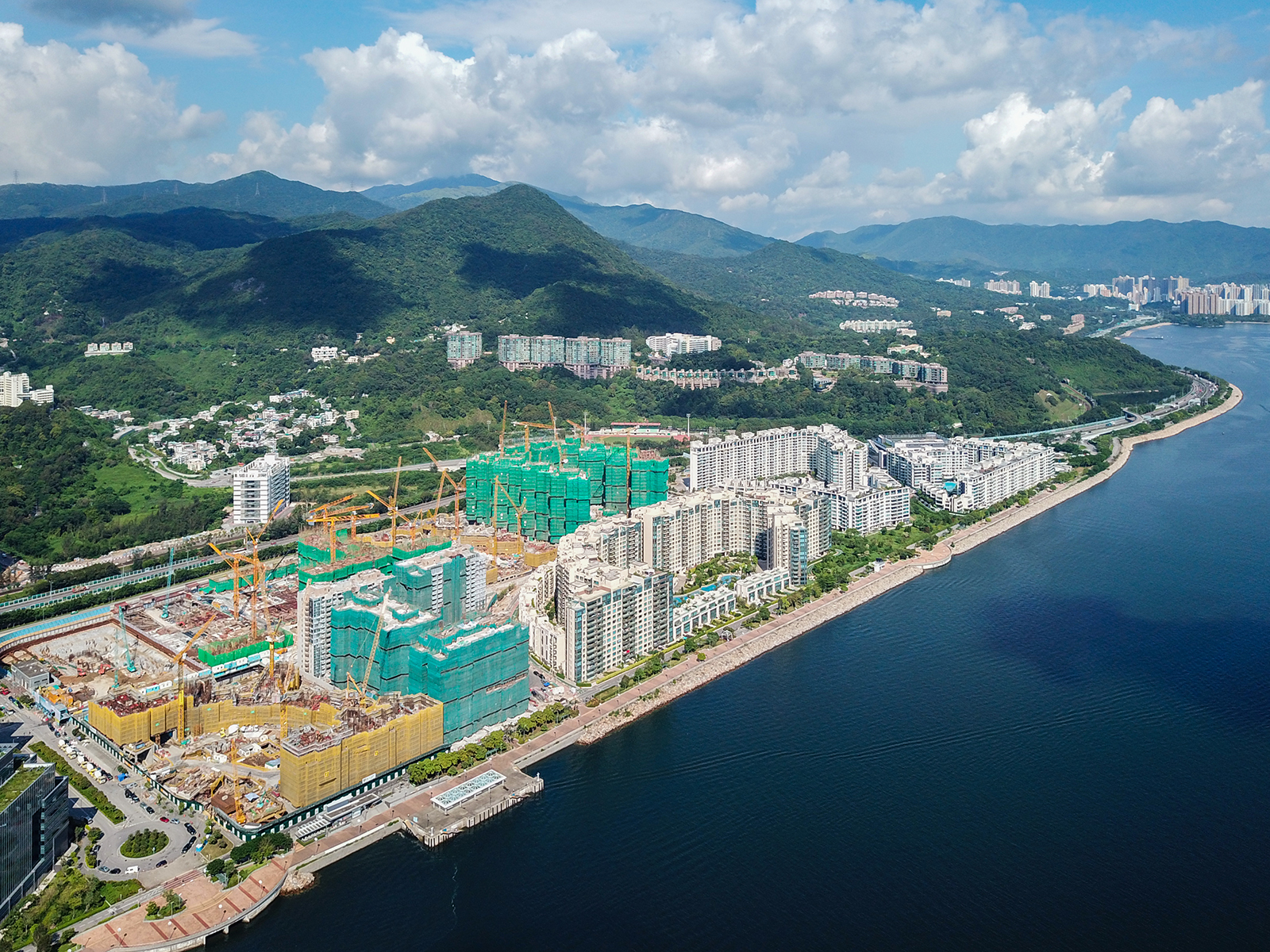
Pak Shek Kok in June 2018

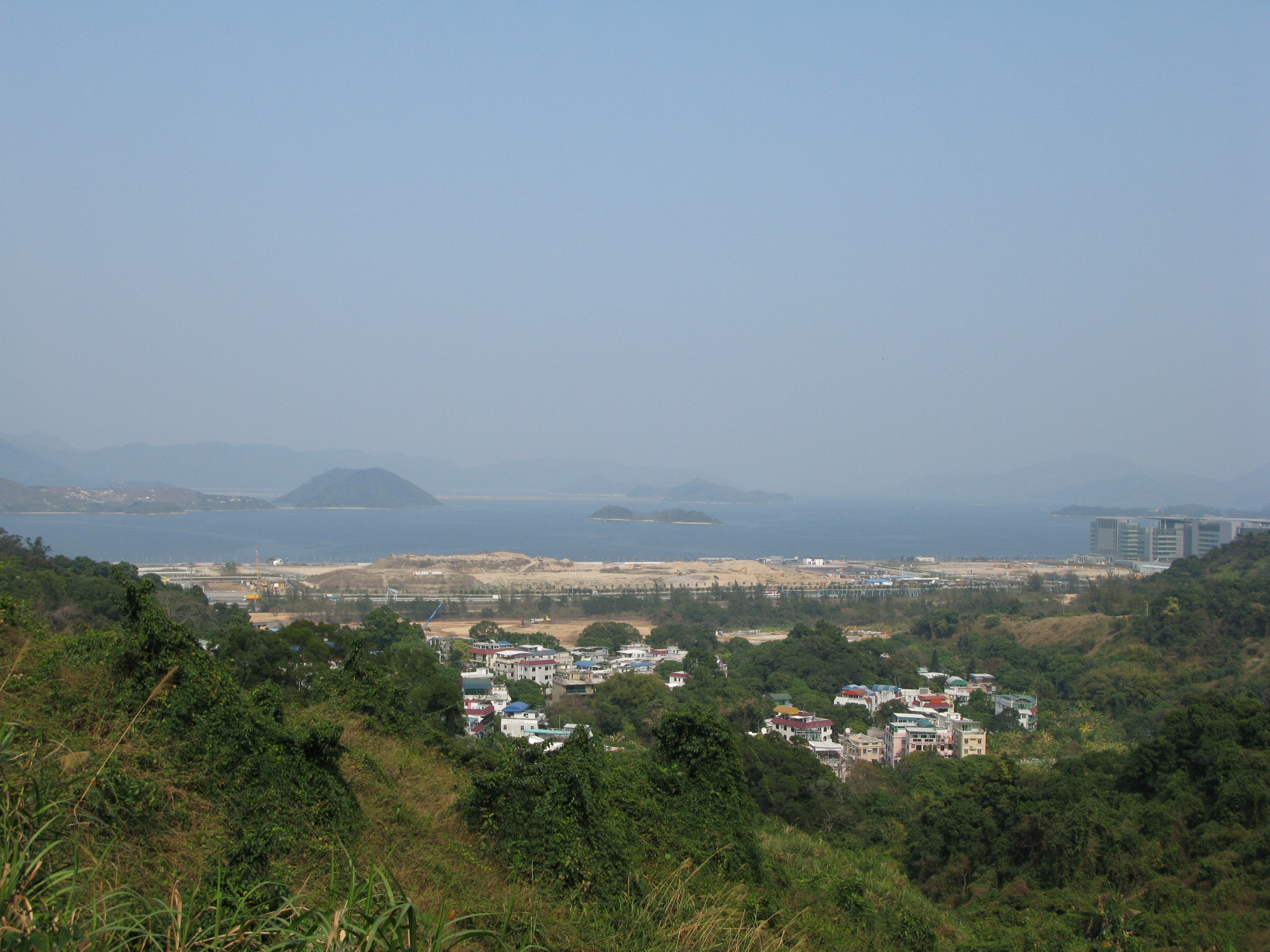
The view of Pak Shek Kok in March 2008. The original Pak Shek Kok is located near the village houses on the right, beneath the hill on the right.

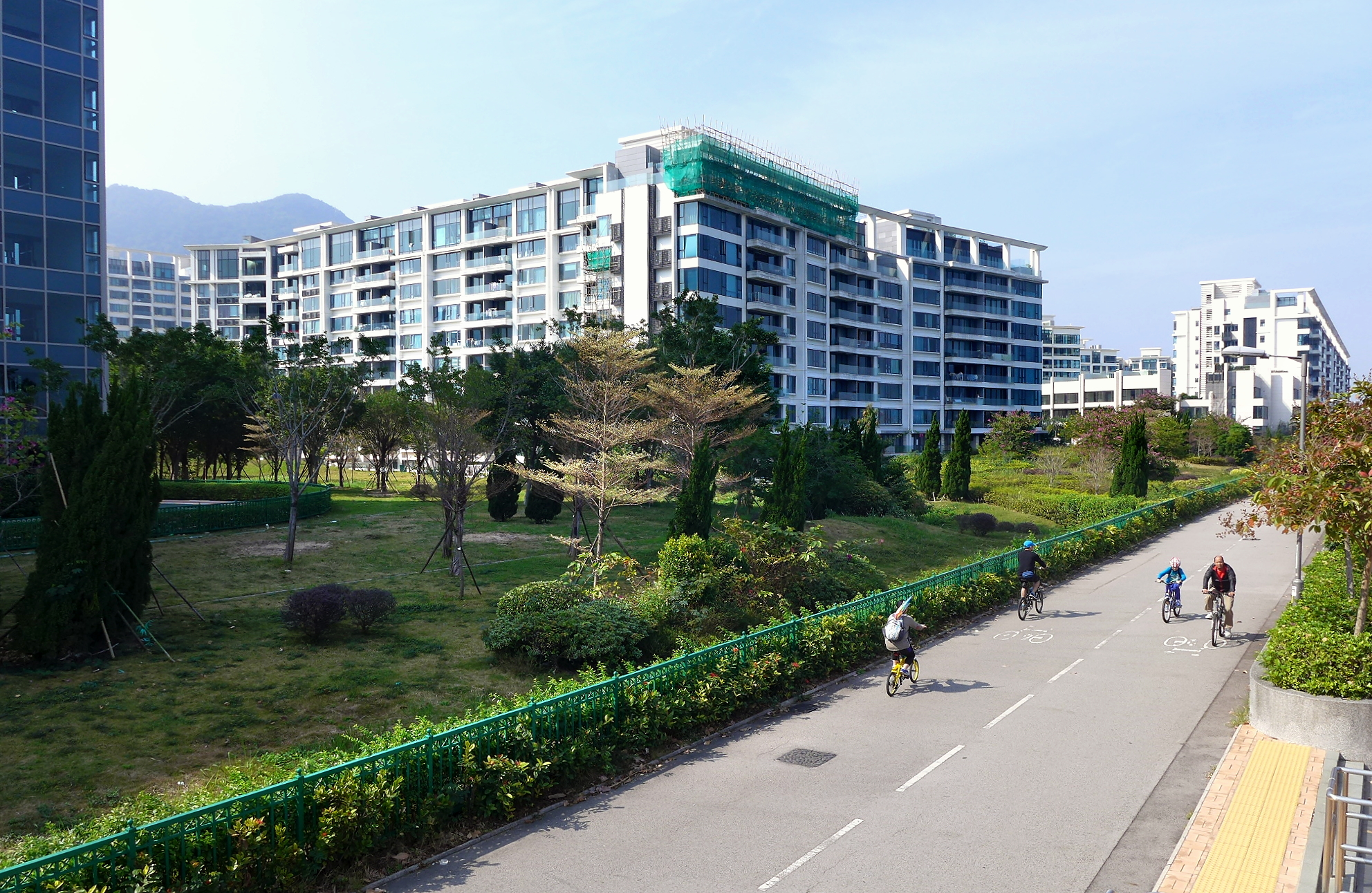
Providence Bay in January 2016

Pak Shek Kok (Chinese: 白石角; Jyutping: baak6 sek6 gok3) is a place in Tai Po District in Hong Kong, located between Ma Liu Shui and Tai Po Kau, close to Cheung Shue Tan and facing Tolo Harbour (Tai Po Hoi). The MTR, Tolo Highway, Hong Kong Science Park are all situated on the reclamation outside Pak Shek Kok.

== History ==
Pak Shek Kok is first recorded in a 1929 map by the War Office, surveyed under Lieutenant Henry Wace of the Royal Engineers.

In April 1997, the Legislative Council commissioned a detailed feasibility study for the development of the Pak Shek Kok Development Area. This marked the beginning of its transition from a relatively remote area to a residential suburb.

== Geography ==
Pak Shek Kok was the estuary of two creeks from nearby valleys of Cheung Shue Tau. Kok (角) in Cantonese means convex land on the shore and thus was used to describe the land formed by two creeks running into Tai Po Hoi. Pak Shek (白石) means white rock. It is probably the feature of land but without well documentary.

The estuary was completely covered by reclamation and the mouth of creeks was redirect to a drainage.

== Politics ==
The proper Pak Shek Kok and surrounding villages are within Tai Po District. As it is close to the border of Sha Tin District, the reclamation off Pak Shek Kok divides. Most of Hong Kong Science Park belongs to Sha Tin and the rest belongs to Tai Po.

== Development ==
In January 2013, the government issued a proposal to develop Pak Shek Kok (East) for residential use, under Outline Zoning Plan S/PSK/10. Associated is a proposed rail station, Pak Shek Kok station.
