= Hong Kong Science Park =

University science park in Pak Shek Kok, Hong Kong

Coordinates: 22°25′35.634″N 114°12′40.496″E

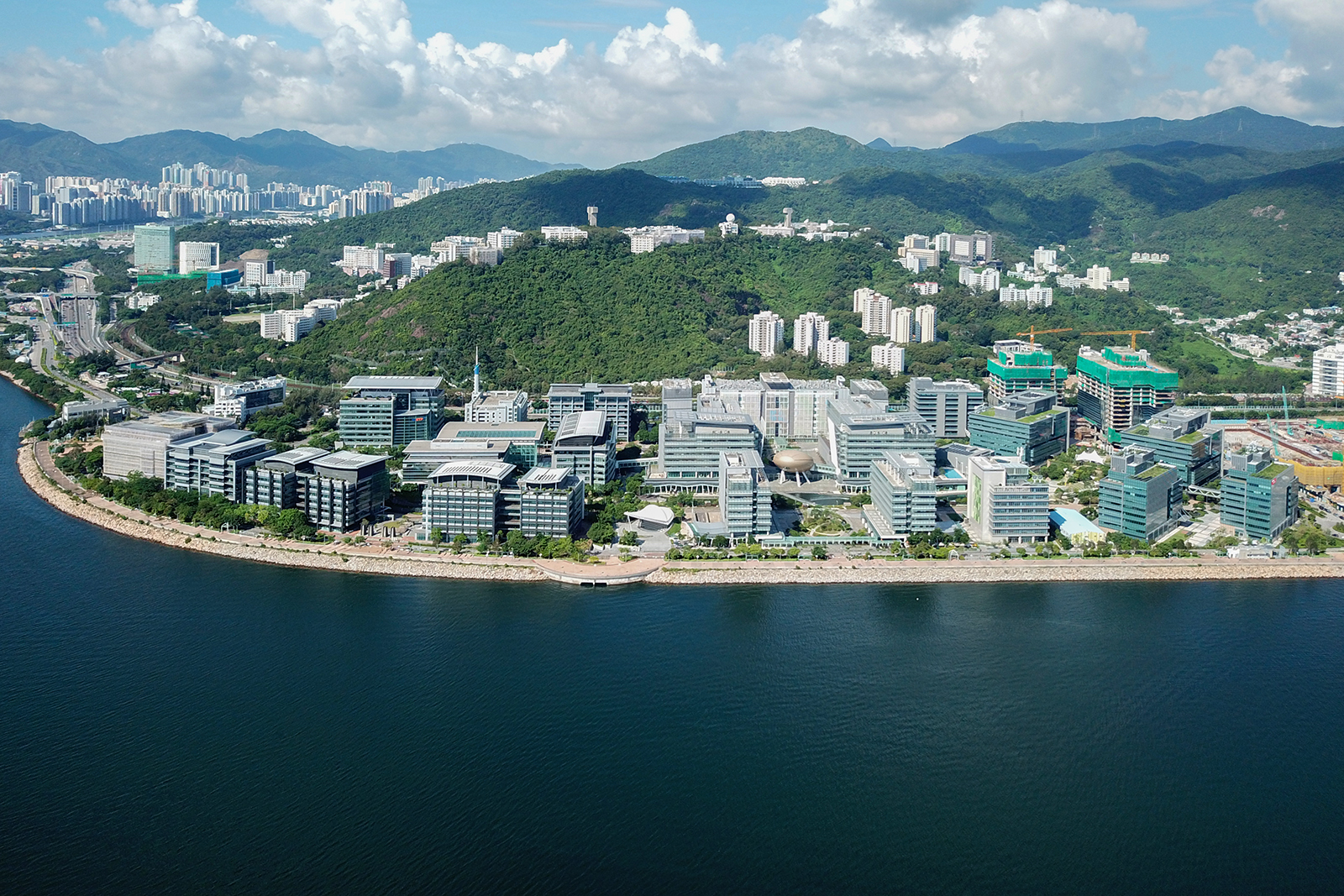
- Hong Kong Science Park (2018)
- Traditional Chinese: 香港科學園
- Simplified Chinese: 香港科学园
Transcriptions
Standard Mandarin
- Hanyu Pinyin: Xiānggǎng Kēxué Yuán
Yue: Cantonese
- Jyutping: hoeng1 gong2 fo1 hok6 jyun4

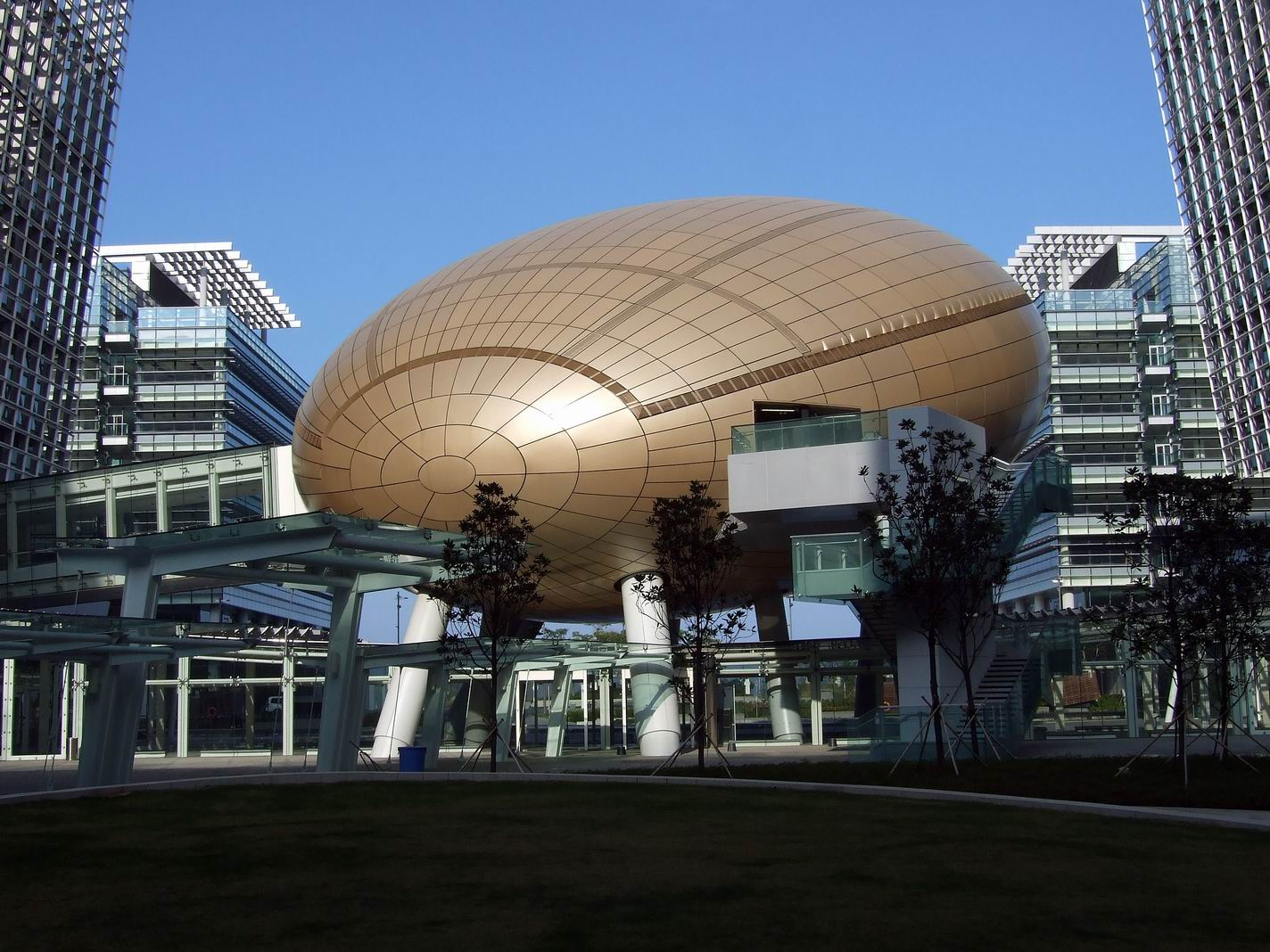
Charles K. Kao Auditorium (2007)

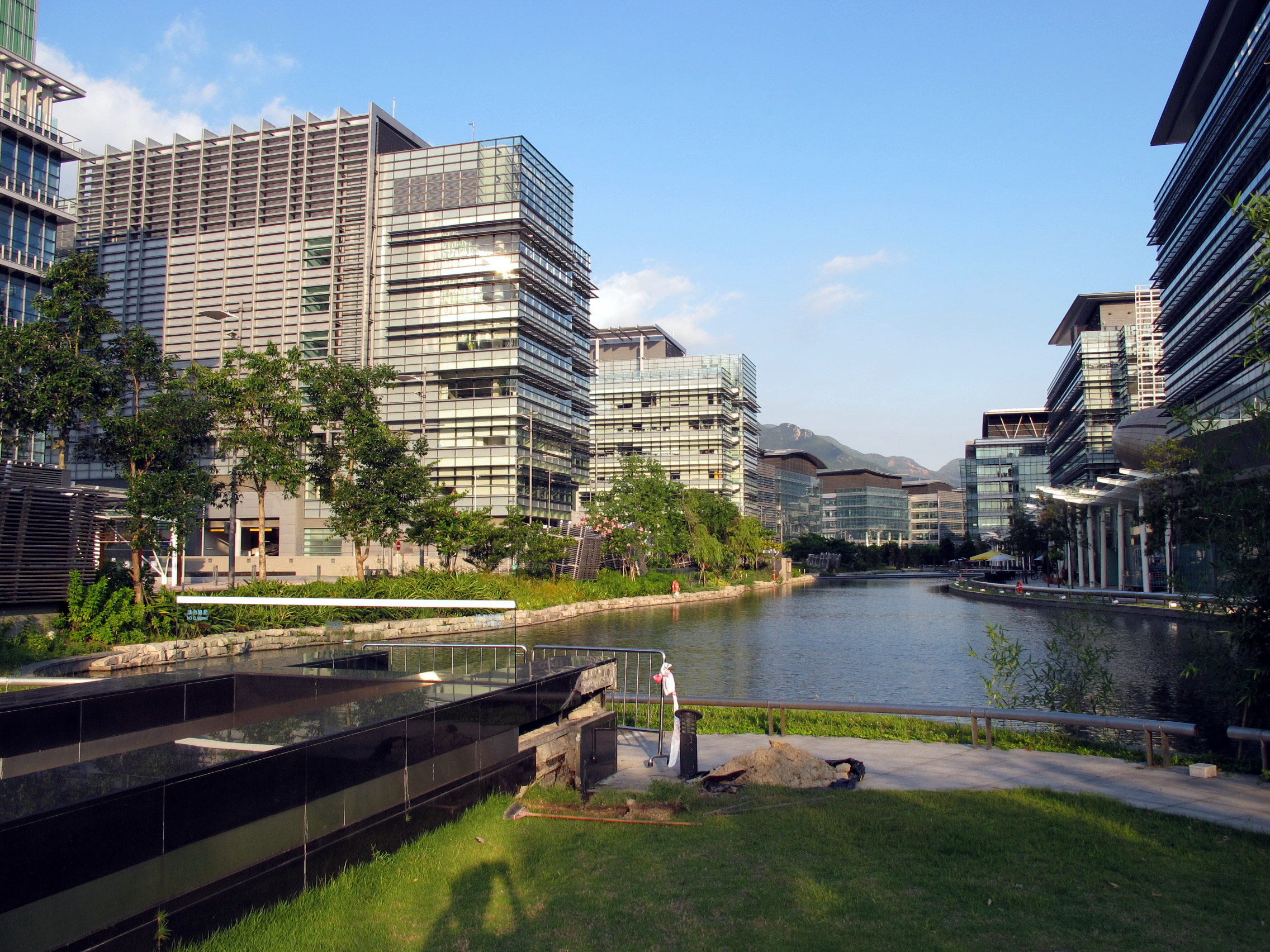
Hong Kong Science Park Central Lake (2011)

The Hong Kong Science Park (HKSTP; Chinese: 香港科學園) is a science park in Pak Shek Kok, New Territories, Hong Kong. It sits on the Tolo Harbour waterfront, near the Chinese University of Hong Kong. The park is administered by the Hong Kong Science and Technology Parks Corporation, a statutory body established in 2001. Reclamation for the Science Park site at the southern part of the area was completed in December 1999.

The campus is located mostly in Sha Tin District and partly in Tai Po District.

== Facilities ==
Hong Kong Science Park provides a campus-like environment of 330,000 square metres marketed for high-technology enterprises. It is designed to accommodate companies of all sizes and stages of development and to promote interaction and innovation at both a local and global level.

== Transport ==
- Bus route: 43P, 43S, 74D, 74P, 82C, 96, 263A, 271B, 272A, 272K, 272P, 272S, 272X, 274P
- Minibus route: 27, 27A, 27B, 29, 806A, 806B
- University station (MTR), Pak Shek Kok station (planned)

== See also ==
- Cyberport
- Lok Ma Chau Loop Innovation and Technology Park
