= Six-Day War (1899) =

1899 conflict in Hong Kong

Six-Day War of 1899
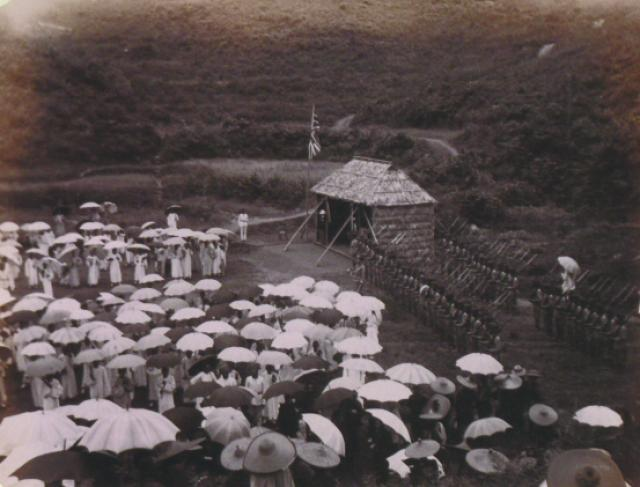
- The ceremony marking the assumption of British control in the New Territories (1899)
Date	14–19 April 1899
Location	New Territories, British Hong Kong
Result	British victory
Territorial changes	Acceptance of British control in the New Territories between the Sham Chun River and Boundary Street

Belligerents
United Kingdom: Hong Kong	Punti clans: Ping Shan; Ha Tsuen; Kam Tin; Pat Heung; Shap Pat Heung; Tai Po Tsat Yeuk; Tungkun clans: Ngan Tin; Wai Tak

Commanders and leaders
Henry Arthur Blake; James Stewart Lockhart; Francis Henry May; Roger Keyes; William Gascoigne; Nicholas Purcell O'Gorman; Captain Berger; Arthur Leonard Barrett; C. S. Simmonds	Tang Sai-ying; Tang Hau-ying; Tang Yi-yau; Tang Fong-hing; Tang Chiu-yi; Tang Sek-leung; Tang Tsing-wan; Ng Shing-chi; Man Tsam-chuen

Strength
~525 troops	~2,600 militia

Casualties and losses
2 wounded	~500 killed

The Six-Day War was a brief war fought between the United Kingdom and several punti clans of the New Territories in Hong Kong from 14–19 April 1899. Several punti clan leaders were opposed to the British takeover of the New Territories, which had been approved by the Qing dynasty via the Second Convention of Peking. Fearing the loss of their traditional land rights, a force of 2,600 militiamen attacked nearby British forces before being quickly beaten back, suffering 500 dead in the process. Governor Henry Arthur Blake took a conciliatory stance towards the punti clans, agreeing to acknowledge their land rights, which continue to be recognised into the present day.

== Background ==
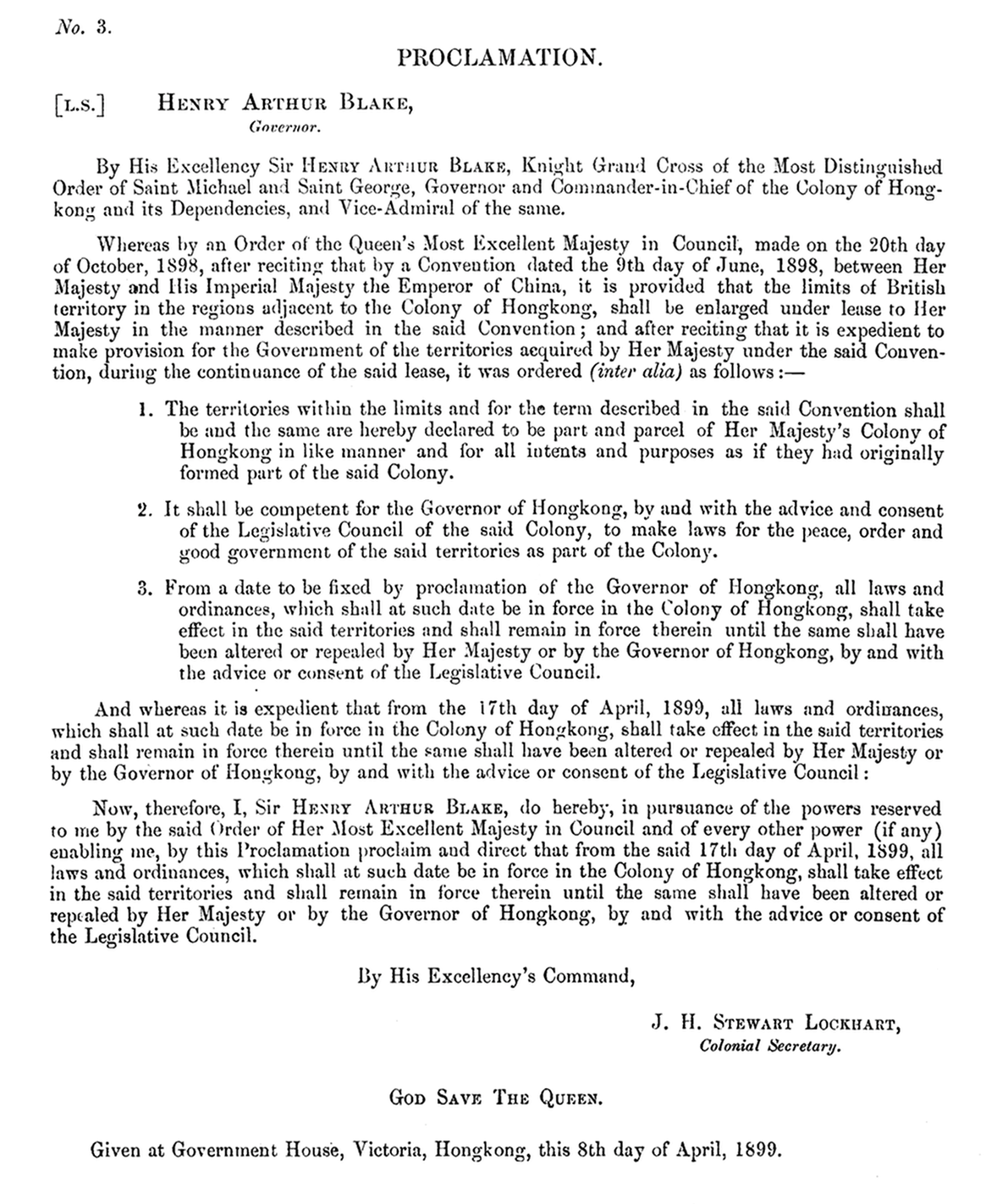
The proclamation of the New Territories of Hong Kong by Colonial Secretary James Stewart Lockhart.

On 9 June 1898, the British Empire and the Qing dynasty signed the Second Convention of Peking, granting Britain a 99-year lease of the New Territories as part of British Hong Kong. Feeling abandoned by the government of the Qing dynasty and fearing the loss of their traditional land rights, several punti clans mobilised a force of 2,600 militiamen which had been trained and equipped to defend against longshore raids by pirates and attempted to resist the British takeover of the territory.

== War ==
The war began on 14 April 1899 when the militia burnt down the masthead the British had prepared for a flag-raising ceremony at the Flagstaff Hill in Tai Po. 125 Indian soldiers of the Royal Hong Kong Regiment (Note: Disbanded in 1902, this regiment is not to be confused with the later Royal Hong Kong Regiment formed from the body of the Hong Kong Volunteer Defence Corps consisting primarily of Europeans and Chinese.) were sent to Tai Po on 15 April and were soon besieged by the militia. They were rescued after the Royal Navy destroyer HMS Fame shelled the militia's positions. On 17 April, British forces launched an attack against the militia in Lam Tsuen Valley and chased them up nearby hills, eventually defeating them.

On 18 April, about 1,600 militiamen attacked a British force at Sheung Tsuen but were quickly beaten back. Further resistance was ended when British forces brought up artillery against the punti walled villages, and the militia surrendered on 19 April. Most prominent of the villages in the resistance Kat Hing Wai, of the Tang clan, was symbolically disarmed, by having its main gates dismounted and removed. During the war, the militia suffered 500 men killed in action and the British suffered 2 men wounded in action.

== Aftermath ==
Suspicious of the Qing government's support for the punti clans during the war, British forces entered the Kowloon Walled City in May 1899 and expelled the Chinese garrison. After the war, Governor Henry Arthur Blake adopted an amiable co-operation policy with the villagers and it remained the official policy of the colonial government on the New Territories throughout almost the entire period of British rule in Hong Kong. The British made the concession of allowing the indigenous inhabitants to retain traditional laws and customs to land inheritance, land usage and marriage, these differed from the laws made for Kowloon and Hong Kong proper and the legacy of which continues to this day through the Small House Policy and bodies such as the Heung Yee Kuk.

== See also ==
- Mui Shue Hang

== Bibliography ==
- Hase, Patrick H. (2008). The Six-Day War of 1899: Hong Kong in the Age of Imperialism. Hong Kong: Hong Kong University Press. ISBN 9789622098992.
