= Greater China =

Region with cultural ties to Chinese people

- Traditional Chinese: 大中華
- Simplified Chinese: 大中华
Transcriptions
Standard Mandarin
- Hanyu Pinyin: Dà Zhōnghuá
- Bopomofo: ㄉㄚˋ ㄓㄨㄥˉ ㄏㄨㄚˊ
- Wade–Giles: Ta^{4} Chung^{1}-hua^{2}
- IPA: [tâ.ʈʂʊ́ŋ.xwâ]
Yue: Cantonese
- Jyutping: Daai6 zung1 waa4
- IPA: [taj˨ tsʊŋ˥ wa˩]
Southern Min
- Hokkien POJ: Tāi Tiong-hôa

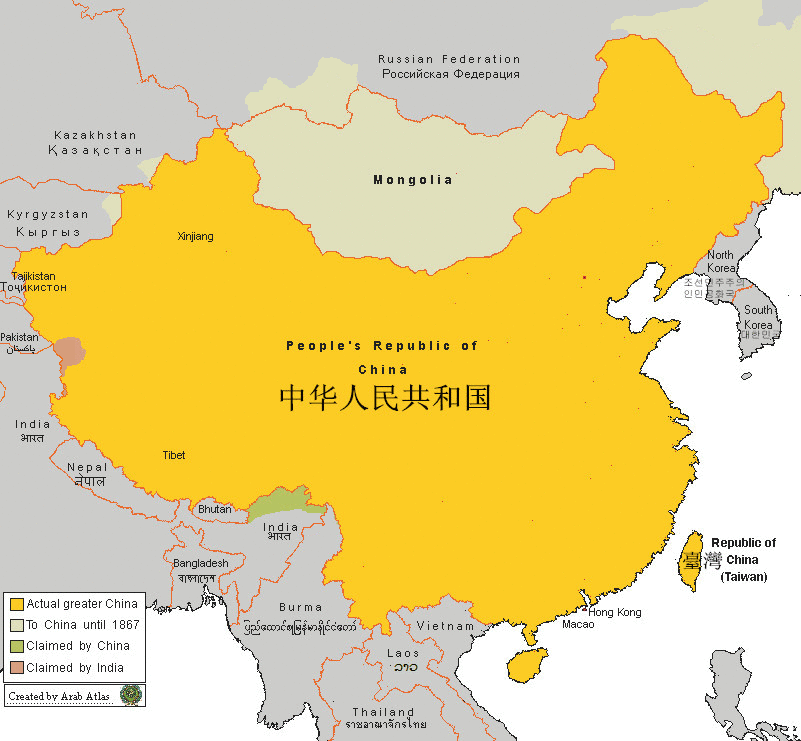
The map including PRC, ROC and other disputed territories

In ethnogeography, Greater China is a loosely defined region sharing cultural and economic ties with the Chinese people, often used by international enterprises or organisations in unofficial usage. The notion contains a "great deal of ambiguity in its geographical coverage and politico-economic implications", because some use it to refer to "the commercial ties among ethnic Chinese, whereas others are more interested in cultural interactions, and still others in the prospects for political reunification". The term encompass "linkages among regional Chinese communities", but usually refers to an area encompassing the People's Republic of China (mainland China, Hong Kong, Macau) and the Republic of China (Taiwan), places where the majority population is culturally Chinese.

The term's usage is contested; some observers in Taiwan characterise the term as harmful or a conflation of distinct polities and markets, while the Chinese government has avoided it, either to allay fears of its economic expansionism or to avoid suggesting Taiwan (known as the Republic of China) and the People's Republic of China are on equal footing. Several articles in The China Quarterly see the Greater China concept as a way to summarise "the linkages among the fair-flung international Chinese community", thereby incorporating Singapore and overseas Chinese communities in their usage of the term, whereas Chinese-Australian sinologist Wang Gungwu has characterised the concept as a "myth", and "wrong" if applied to overseas Chinese communities.

== Usage ==
Multinational corporations frequently use the term when naming their headquarters in the region. For example, Procter & Gamble uses the term to name its regional headquarters in Guangzhou that also operates in Hong Kong and Taipei; Apple uses it when referring to its regional headquarters in Shanghai.

The term is often used to avoid invoking sensitivities over the political status of Taiwan. Contrastingly, it has been used in reference to Chinese irredentism in nationalist contexts, such as the notion that China should reclaim its "lost territories" to create a Greater China.

== History ==
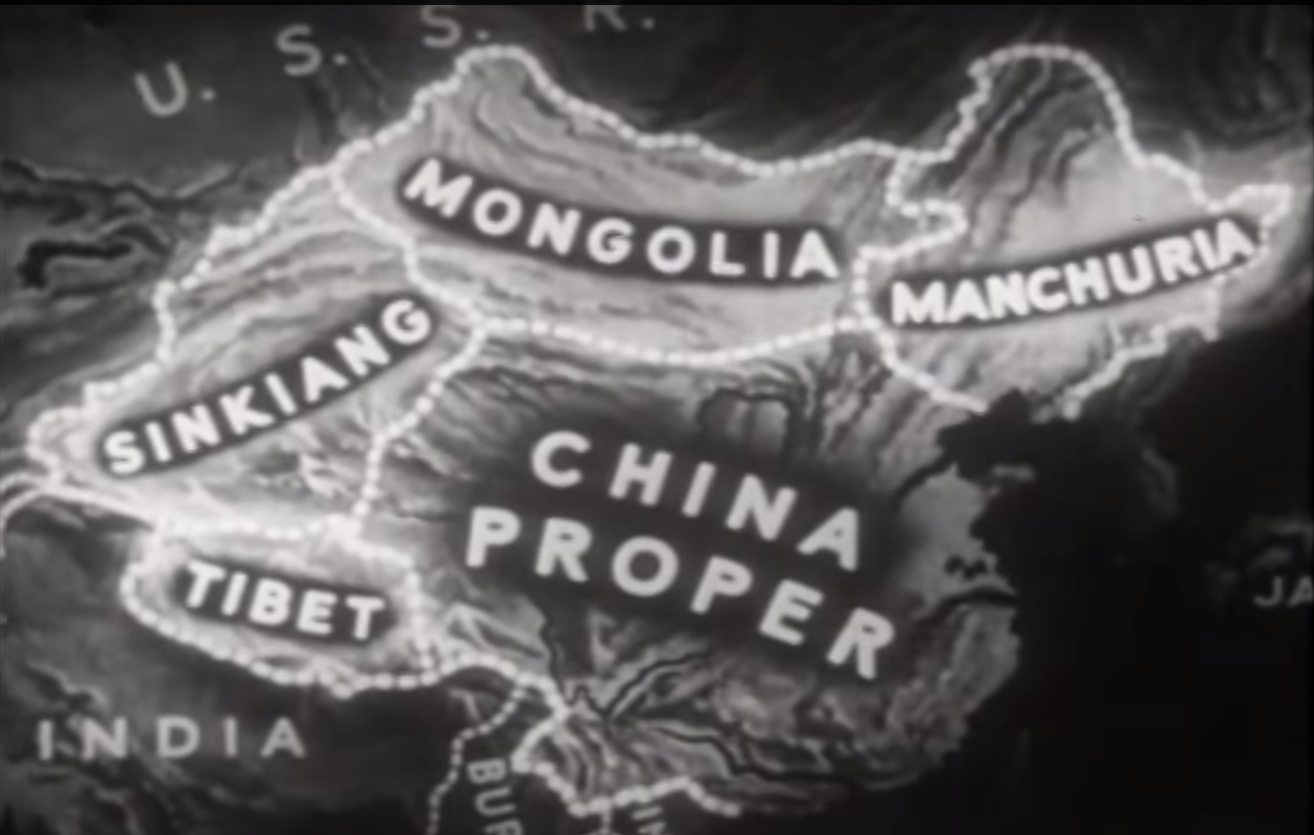
Map from the 1944 American propaganda film The Battle of China, showing the territories of the Republic of China: China proper, Manchuria, Mongolia, Sinkiang, and Tibet

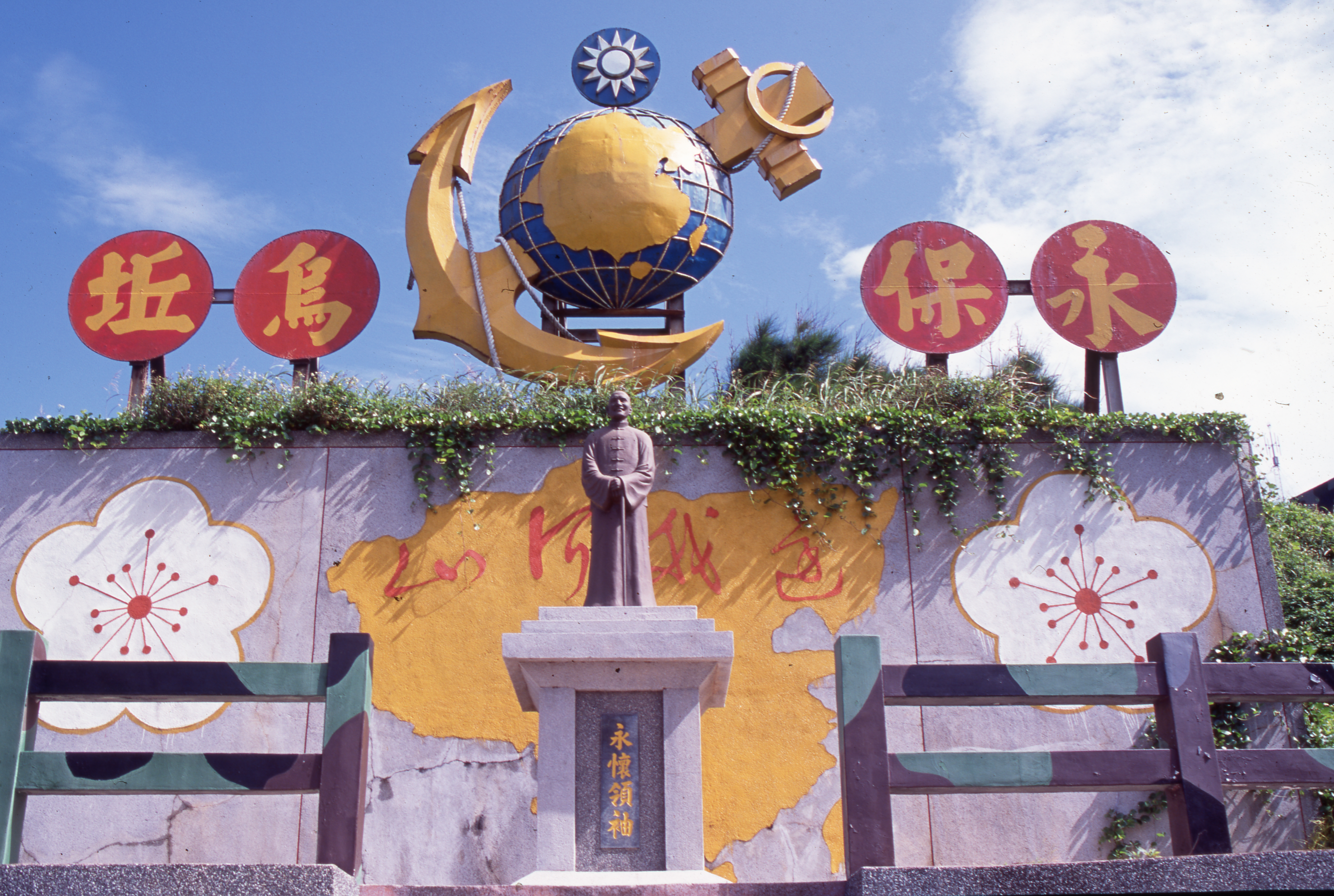
Territories claimed by the Republic of China on a monument to Chiang Kai-shek in Wuqiu

The term has been used for a long time, but with differing scopes and connotations.

During the 1930s, George Cressey, an American academic who did work for the US State Department throughout his career, used the term to refer to the entirety of the territory controlled by the Qing dynasty, as opposed to China proper. Usage by the United States on government maps in the 1940s as a political term included territories claimed by the Republic of China that were part of the previous Qing Empire, or geographically to refer to topographical features associated with China that may or may not have lain entirely within Chinese political borders.

The concept began to appear again in Chinese language sources in the late 1970s, referring to the growing commercial ties between the mainland and Hong Kong, with the possibility of extending these to Taiwan, with perhaps the first such reference being in a Taiwanese journal Changqiao in 1979.

The English term subsequently re-emerged in the 1980s to refer to the growing economic ties between the regions as well as the possibility of political unification. It is not an institutionalized entity such as the EU, ASEAN, or AU. The concept is a generalization to group several markets seen to be closely linked economically and does not imply sovereignty. The concept does not always include Taiwan, for instance Cisco uses "Greater China and Taiwan" to refer to the market.

== See also ==
- Adoption of Chinese literary culture
- Bamboo network
- Chinese expansionism
- Chinese imperialism
- Chinese irredentism
- Chinese nationalism
- Sinosphere
- Nanyang
- History of China
- List of tributaries of China
- Nine-dash line
- Sinocentrism
- Sinophone
- Greater Britain
