= Mui Shue Hang =

Coordinates: 22.454951°N 114.152008°E

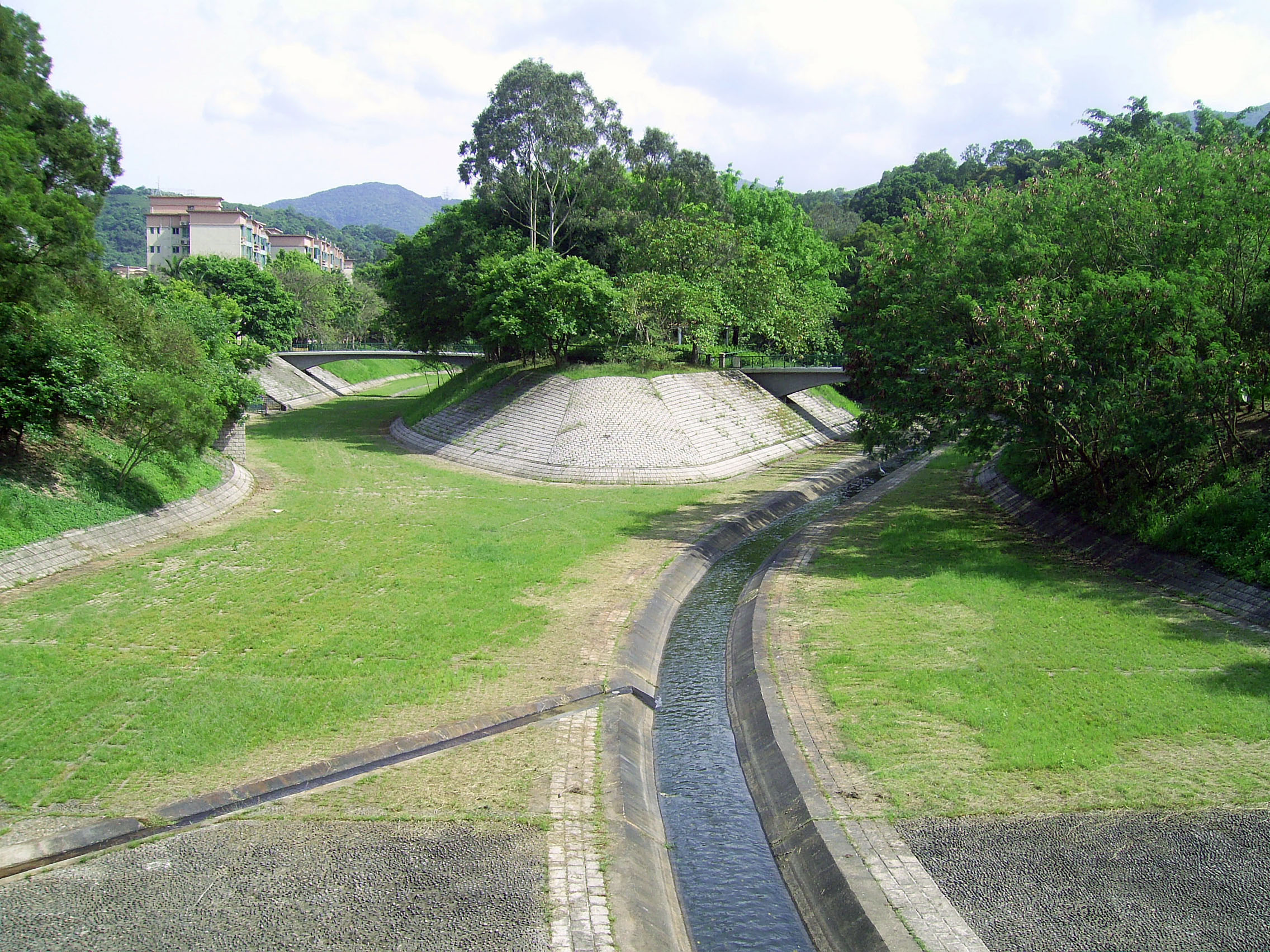
Lam Tsuen River at Mui Shue Hang.

Mui Shue Hang (Chinese: 梅樹坑) is a village in Tai Po District, Hong Kong.

== Administration ==
Mui Shue Hang is a recognized village under the New Territories Small House Policy.

== History ==
A battle took place at Mui Shue Hang on April 15, 1899, as part of the Six-Day War, a brief war fought between the United Kingdom and several punti clans of the New Territories in Hong Kong from 14–19 April 1899.

The Ever Rest Temple (常寂園), a temple and columbarium, was originally built in Mui Shue Hang in 1854.
