= New Kowloon =

Area in Hong Kong

Coordinates: 22.3341°N 114.1871°E

New Kowloon 新九龍
- Area
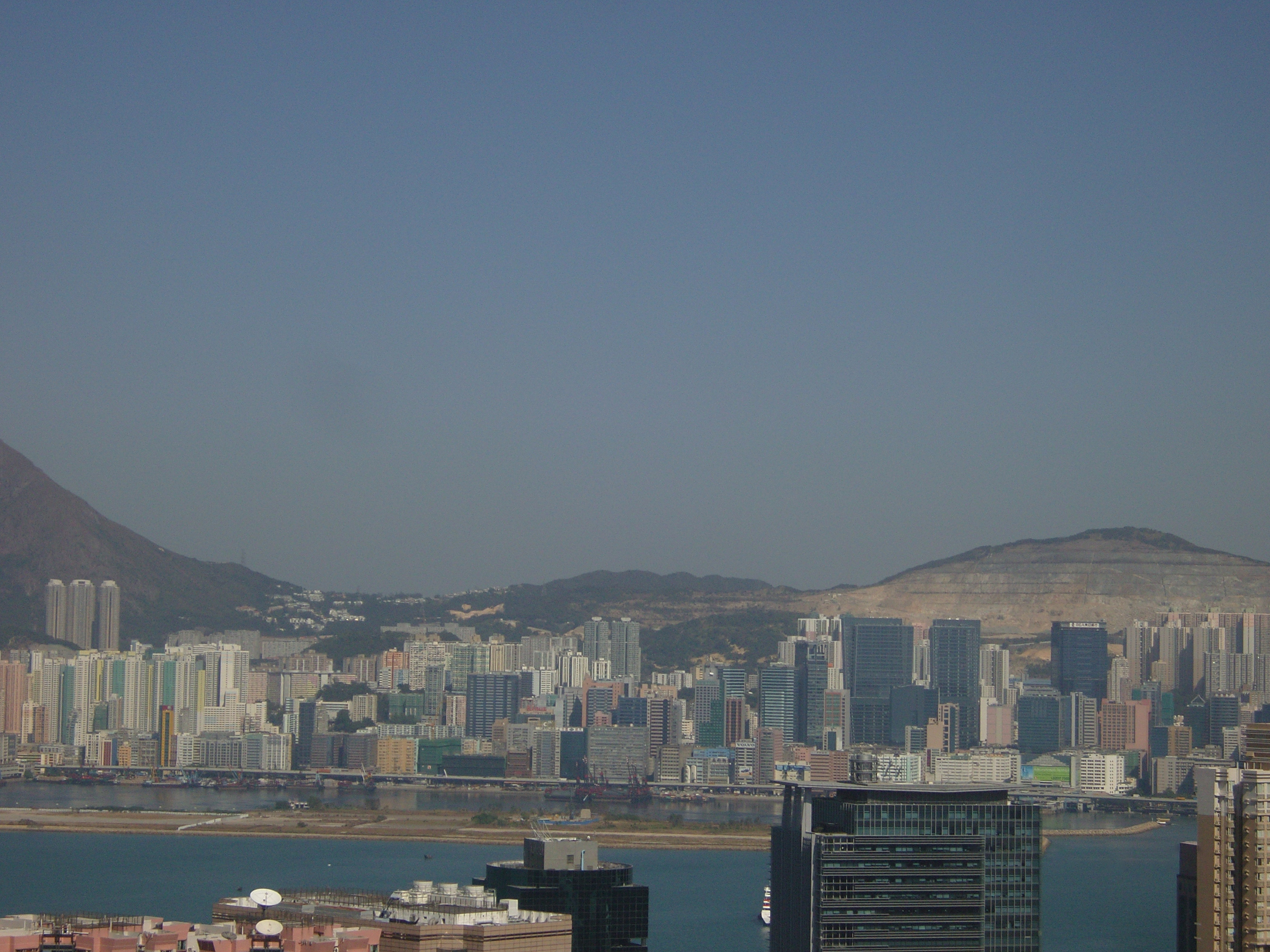
- Eastern New Kowloon (Kowloon Bay, Kwun Tong, etc.)
- Etymology: Named after the Kowloon Peninsula
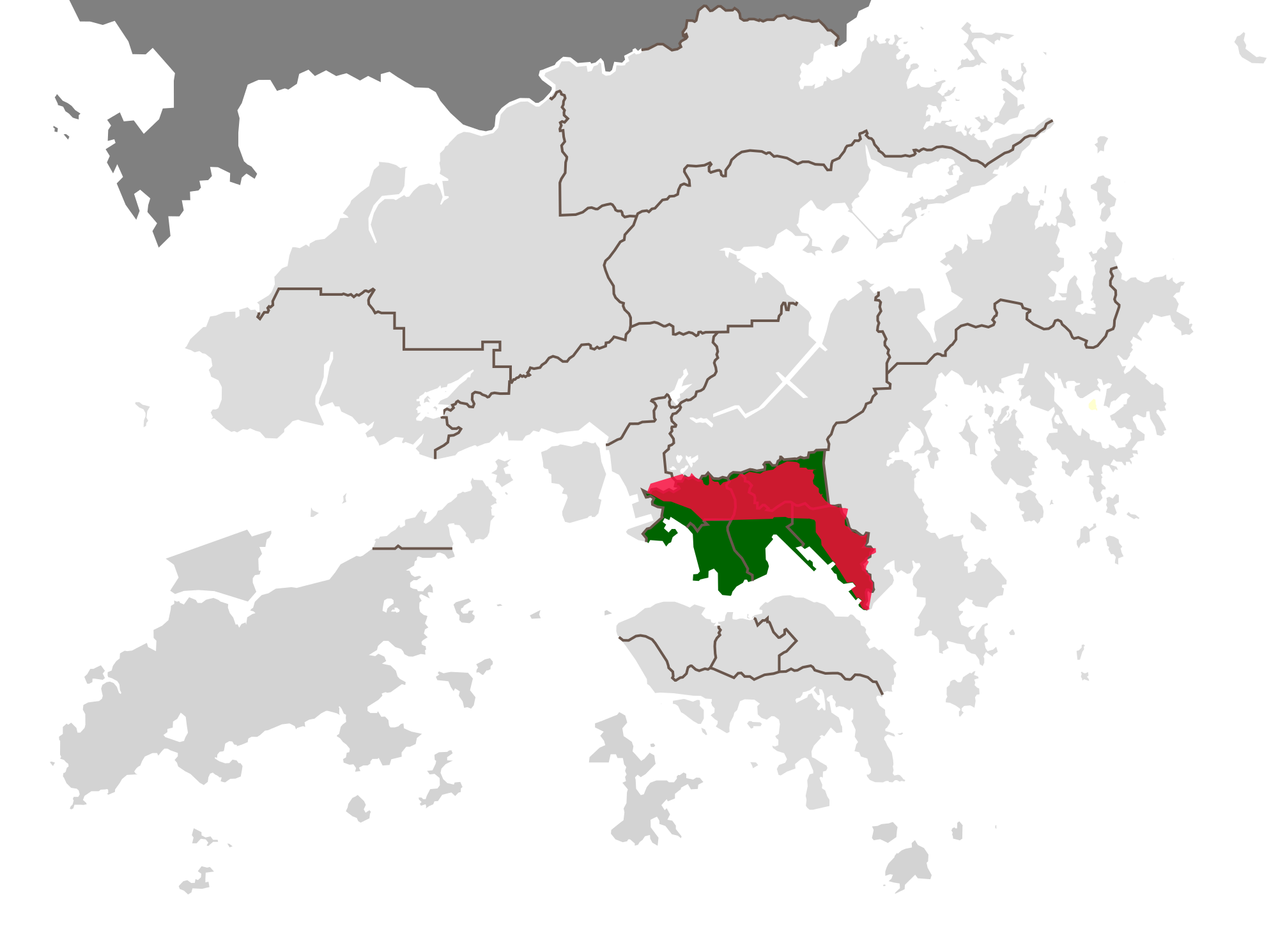
- Approx. location of New Kowloon (in red), as defined in a 1937 legislation, compared to the Kowloon geographical constituencies of the Legislative Council (in green); note that the newer 13/31 runway of the former Kai Tak Airport reclaimed land (also coloured in green), now considered part of New Kowloon, e.g. in lot numbers, did not exist until the 1950s.
- Statutorily-defined area(s): Kowloon / New Territories
- Territory: Hong Kong
- Sovereign state: China
- Cession of Kowloon: 1860
- Leased (as a part of the New Territories): 1898
- Defined (from a part of the New Territories): 1900
- Time zone: Hong Kong Time

Chinese name
- Traditional Chinese: 新九龍
- Simplified Chinese: 新九龙
- Cantonese Yale: Sān Gáulùhng
- Literal meaning: New Nine Dragons
Transcriptions
Standard Mandarin
- Hanyu Pinyin: Xīn Jiǔlóng
Hakka
- Romanization: Sin^{1} Giu^{3}lung^{2}
Yue: Cantonese
- Yale Romanization: Sān Gáulùhng
- Jyutping: San1 Gau2lung4
- IPA: [sɐn˥kɐw˧˥lʊŋ˩]

New Kowloon is an area in Hong Kong, bounded to the south by Boundary Street, and to the north by the ranges of the Eagle's Nest, Beacon Hill, Lion Rock, Tate's Cairn and Kowloon Peak. It covers the present-day Kwun Tong District and Wong Tai Sin District, and northern parts of the Sham Shui Po District and Kowloon City District.

The name of this area is rarely used in day-to-day life. Areas that belong to New Kowloon are usually referred to as a part of Kowloon. However, in land leases, it is common to refer to land lots in lot numbers as "New Kowloon Inland Lot number #".

== History ==
By the Convention of Peking in 1860, the territory of British-owned Kowloon was defined as area on the Kowloon Peninsula south of a line which later became Boundary Street (known as Kowloon, inclusive of Stonecutters Island), which was ceded by the Qing Empire (Ch'ing Empire, Manchu Empire) to the United Kingdom under the Convention.

On the other hand, the territory north of Boundary Street (later known as New Kowloon) remained part of Qing Empire until it was leased as part of the New Territories to the UK in 1898 for 99 years under the Convention for the Extension of Hong Kong Territory (also known as the Second Convention of Peking). The area of New Kowloon was defined in statutory law first in November 1900 (and referred to as such) and again in December 1937 to increase land available for urban development. For most part the northern boundary of the area was defined by the 500 feet (152 metres) contour. In practice, nevertheless, both the areas to the south and to the north of Boundary Street (i.e. both Kowloon and New Kowloon), from the Lei Yue Mun strait in the east to Mei Foo Sun Chuen and Lai Chi Kok Bay in the west, are collectively known as "Kowloon". For example, a postal address in Kwun Tong will identify "Kowloon" as its regional destination, even though it is technically in New Kowloon and not part of Kowloon as statutorily defined.

== Current situation ==
In modern-day conversations, the term "New Kowloon" is now rarely heard in Hong Kong. New Kowloon is no longer regarded as part of the New Territories, but as a part of the Kowloon urban area beyond Boundary Street. Nevertheless, the legal definitions of Kowloon, New Kowloon and New Territories remain unchanged—New Kowloon has remained legally part of the New Territories instead of Kowloon. On 1 July 1997, the territories on both sides of Boundary Street (ceded and leased respectively) were transferred to China, along with the rest of Hong Kong.

However, the designation "New Kowloon" still has some legal implications. Almost all lands of Hong Kong are government land (known as crown land in Commonwealth countries and before 1997 in Hong Kong), while all crown leases (now known as government leases in Hong Kong) of New Kowloon and New Territories lands were to expire on 27 June 1997, but were automatically extended to 30 June 2047 due to the Sino-British Joint Declaration. This renewal implies that, all privately owned land leases of New Kowloon, has to pay government rent (crown rent in Commonwealth countries) as leases in the rest of the New Territories, and unlike the rest of the Kowloon. Most land leases in Kowloon proper (i.e. south of Boundary Street) are not required to pay the land rent to the government, unless they are new leases, or are old leases having been renewed and such clauses have been inserted in the renewed lease contract.

The land reclaimed from the Kowloon Bay water body, such as Kai Tak, are also referred as part of New Kowloon in land leases, although these lots do not appear to be included in the 1937 map.

== See also ==
- History of Hong Kong
