= Colonial Defence Committee =

British government standing committee

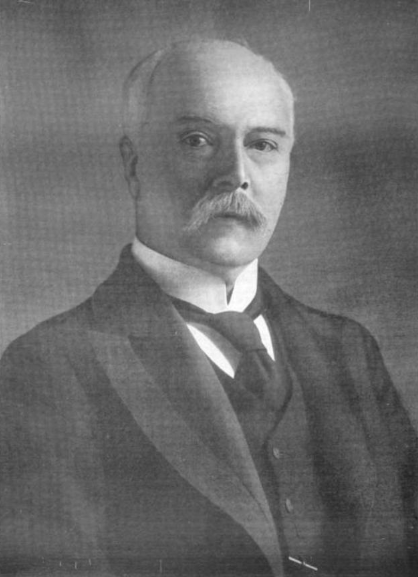
Sir Andrew Clarke, pictured in 1908, a long term secretary to the committee

The Colonial Defence Committee (CDC) was a standing committee of the British Colonial Office between 1885 and 1908. During the second half of the 19th century British Army troops were being progressively withdrawn from colonial garrisons, with the intention being that colonial governments would replace them with locally raised troops. Russian victory in the 1877–1878 Russo-Turkish War led to increased concerns for the security of the British colonies and a short-term Royal Commission looked into colonial defence. It was replaced by the CDC, which first met on 22 April 1885.

One of the CDC's first actions was to ask the colonial governments to report on the condition of defences, the number of troops and quantity of stores held. Concerned about a surprise attack, they also offered advice to the colonial governors as to how to prepare and respond. The CDC asked each colony to prepare a local defence plan for review by the committee. The CDC made recommendations to the governors about improvements to the plans, such a recommendation resulted in the establishment of the Hong Kong Regiment. In some cases, as in Saint Helena, where local means were not sufficient the committee drew up plans for defences which were funded by the British government.

The CDC continued the policy that land-based defence was the responsibility of the colonial governments, assisted by the maritime supremacy of the Royal Navy. It also recommended the standardisation of colonial troops' equipment and training to better allow them to deploy alongside the British Army. This was not welcomed by all colonial governments, who were concerned about involvement in foreign wars. The poor performance of the army in the 1899–1902 Second Boer War led to wide-ranging defence reform, including the establishment of the Committee of Imperial Defence (CID). The CID had more senior members than the CDC and more political clout. The CDC became sidelined and was absorbed into the CID, being renamed the Overseas Defence Committee in 1908.

== Background and establishment ==
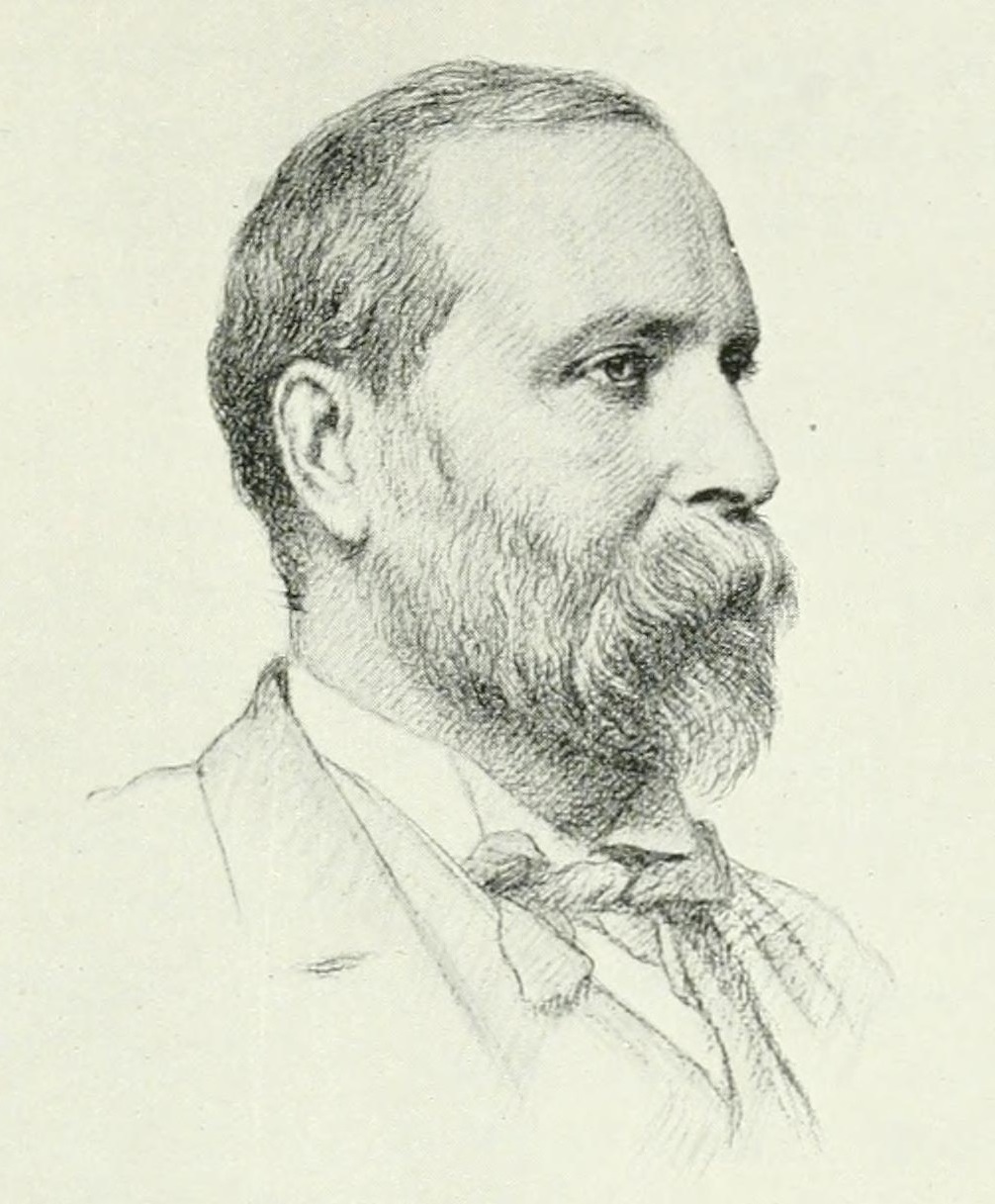
An 1890s depiction of Sir Robert H. Meade

In 1870–71, the government withdrew standing army garrisons from self-governing colonies of the British Empire. This was a key stage in the development of the Empire and removed a significant cost burden from central government. Colonial governments were expected to make their own arrangements to raise forces to carry out internal policing and border defence duties. The move also allowed the British Army to centralise its forces and become more efficient.

The colonial governments were slow and reluctant to raise troops, the costs of which would fall upon colonial taxpayers. The colonies were hampered by the withdrawal of regular troops, which could have acted as models for colonial forces and provided advisers and trainers. Apart from ad hoc advice from Royal Navy officers stationed in adjacent seas or from a small number of officers seconded from the War Office the colonial governments had been left to their own devices.

The British government was concerned that colonial defence was being neglected. This was particularly worrisome during the Russian war scare of 1878–79, which followed Russian victory in the 1877–78 Russo-Turkish War. During the war the Secretary of State for the Colonies Sir Michael Hicks Beach had appointed a special committee to inspect the defences of some key ports in the colonies. They found them deficient, requiring £265,000 (equivalent to £34,400,000 in 2023) of improvements, and only 35–40 suitable cannons were found in Britain that could be sent to augment them. After the war ended the committee was disbanded.

After the war Hicks-Beach remained concerned about the defence of the colonies and established the Royal Commission Appointed to Enquire into the Defence of British Possessions and Commerce Abroad under former Secretary of State for the Colonies Lord Carnarvon. The commission found many colonial governments were unable to answer their queries, requiring investigation by Royal Navy officers.

The commission recommended that imperial garrisons in Barbados be withdrawn but colonial under-secretary Robert Henry Meade halted this, concerned that the colonial government lacked the necessary expertise to secure the ports. Meade consulted with the permanent under secretary Sir Robert Herbert and military officers who agreed that a small Colonial Office standing committee was necessary to coordinate defence arrangements. The Colonial Defence Committee (CDC) was approved and met for the first time on 22 April 1885, to discuss the defence of Barbados. It was composed of a mix of army and naval officers. The first chairman was Sir Andrew Clarke, Inspector-General of Fortifications and one of its early secretaries was Captain George Clarke of the Royal Engineers.

== Early actions ==
The Russian crisis had caused panic in some colonies. The Governor of British Ceylon, James Robert Longden, had ordered the movement of 50,000 long tons (51,000 t) of coal and transported the colony's treasury inland. The CDC was determined to stop such overreactions in the future. A Local Defence Committee was established in all dependencies, to devise local defence plans which would be reviewed and approved by the CDC. The focus was on the defence of the colonies in case of a widescale European war.

One of the CDC's first decisions was to ascertain the current condition of colonial defences, on which there had been no regular reports made. In August 1885 the CDC requested that colonial governments report on naval and land defences, the number of arms, ammunition and marine mines stored, the quantities of electrical and telegraph cable held and the number of troops, both colonial and imperial, in the colony.

The CDC was concerned about a surprise assault on a colony and provided advice to colonial governors on actions to take in case of war. The CDC warned governors that they should not permit more than two foreign warships into a harbour at once and no more than one foreign troopship. They warned that any break in telegraph communications might indicate a state of war. Governors were advised to guard cable routes, set-up mines and implement black-out conditions. Food, coal and currency was also to be guarded.

== Defence plans ==
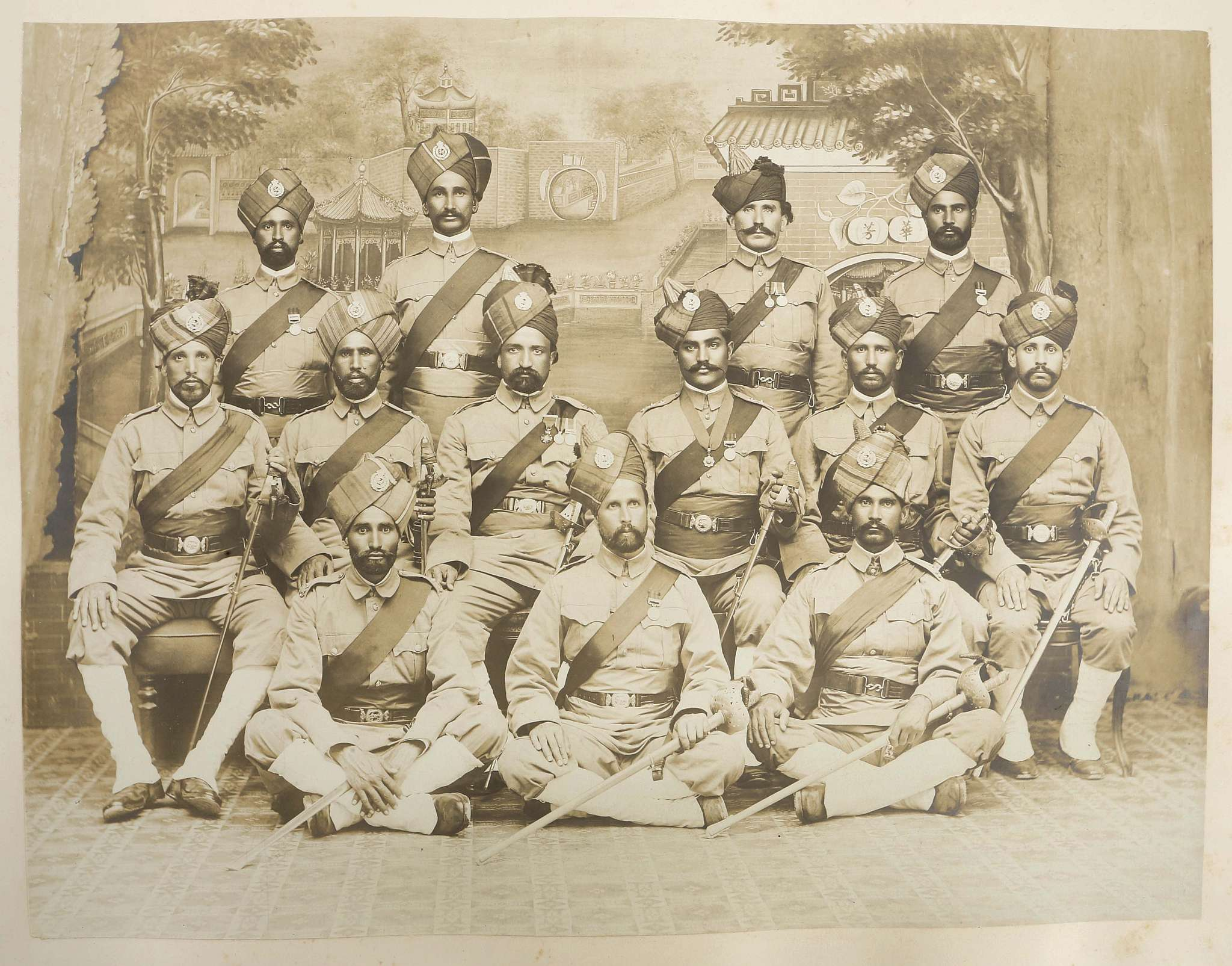
The Hong Kong Regiment

The first 19 local defence plans had been prepared by October 1891. By October 1891 the CDC had reviewed some local plans and made the first 150 of its recommendations to governors. Canada was among the slowest to prepare its plan, to the worry of the CDC particularly after the Venezuelan crisis of 1895, and began work only after the intervention of Colonial Secretary Joseph Chamberlain.

An early recommendation was made on 6 August 1888; that a battalion be added to the garrison at Hong Kong, doubling the infantry available there. This led to the raising of the Hong Kong Regiment of the British Indian Army for service. Between 1895 and 1905 the CDC itself drew up plans for the defence of Jamestown, Saint Helena, which they considered vulnerable to attack from an organised expedition and whose loss would threaten trade in the South Atlantic. These measures were funded by the British government, due to the poor performance of the local economy.

The Secretary of State for War of 1887–1892, Edward Stanhope, wanted to dissolve the CDC and replace it with a high-level Admiralty and War Office committee with more senior staff and a wider remit. This was successfully opposed by the Colonial Secretary, Lord Knutsford, who stated that if the War Office withdrew from the CDC he would find replacement members from retired officers.

== Colonial troops ==
In 1892 the CDC set out, at the request of the Colonial Office, Memorandum 57M that set out the principles of colonial defence. This stated that the defence of the colonies depended upon British supremacy at sea but also noted that it anticipated that the colonial forces could move from a defensive to an offensive role.

CDC and War Office policy was that imperial troops should have no responsibility for the garrisoning of the colonies, which should be protected by colonial troops (who came under the aegis of the Colonial Office), but could be posted to imperial property such as Royal Navy coaling stations. This led to some peculiar effects, for example the officer commanding the garrison at the coaling station in Sierra Leone could not enter the colony proper without War Office permission and had no official communication with the colonial forces of the West African Frontier Force.

The CDC urged that colonial troops standardise their equipment and training, to allow better compatibility on the battlefield. This would provide a pool of colonial troops, perhaps up to 10,000 each from Canada, Australia and South Africa, who could be called upon to serve alongside the British Army at short notice. These plans were resisted by some colonial governments, including Canada and Australia where there were significant factions opposed to involvement in foreign wars. The War Office chose a compromise solution, a cautious programme of standardisation and professionalisation of the colonial forces was to be carried out but the colonies were not expected to make advance commitments that their troops could be deployed overseas.

== Decline ==
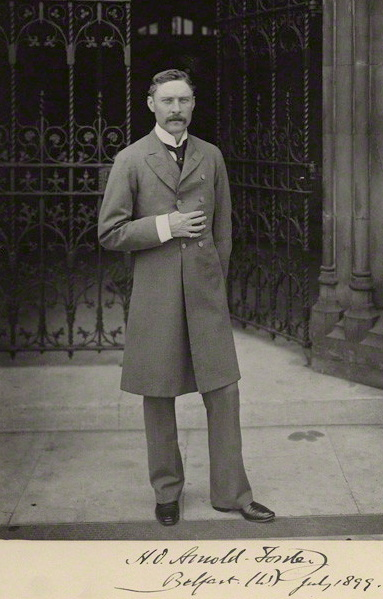
H.O. Arnold-Forster in 1899

The good performance of colonial troops in the 1899-1902 Second Boer War spurred British politicians such as Archibald Primrose, 5th Earl of Rosebery to look for the increased use of colonial forces in British wars. However, with the government focussed on reform of the imperial troops under Reginald Brett, 2nd Viscount Esher's War Office Reconstitution Committee, the Royal Commission on the South African War and the Royal Commission on Militia and Volunteers; together with the 1904 establishment of the Committee of Imperial Defence (CID) left the CDC sidelined. It was ill equipped to engage in political negotiation with the colonies over the deployment of colonial troops. The CDC found it could play little part in an argument between British and Canadian politicians over the command of the Canadian militia, which eventually saw London agree for the British general in command to be replaced by a Canadian military council. In a similar case the CDC and the CID could not persuade the British government that Australia, which contributed a subsidy towards Royal Navy vessels, should not be allowed any control over the deployment of the naval force.

The CDC was essentially a committee of military experts, while the CID had more senior personnel and included political figures. The Secretary of War 1903-1905 H. O. Arnold-Forster, had recommended the disbandment of the CDC when a CID proposal to reduce the imperial West Indies garrison had stalled awaiting CDC approval. This was opposed by the Colonial Office and General James Grierson, the Director of Military Operations. Arnold-Fisher was partly successful and the CDC became an arm of the CID; in 1908 was renamed the Overseas Defence Committee.

== Legacy ==
The CDC is considered the father of the more influential CID (upon its founding the CID had chosen Clarke as its first secretary). It was the first British government body to provide a continual assessment of the defence of the colonies and one of the few to consider both land and sea defence at a time when army and naval policies were sometimes at odds. In common with British cabinet practice of the 19th century no minutes or agendas of meetings of the CDC were kept, though its memoranda survive. In 1909 one of the recommendations of the CDC came to fruition when a meeting with Dominion governments saw an agreement reached for their armed forces to receive standardised War Office training with a view towards becoming a "homogenous Imperial Army".
