= Convention for the Extension of Hong Kong Territory =

1898 treaty between China and the United Kingdom

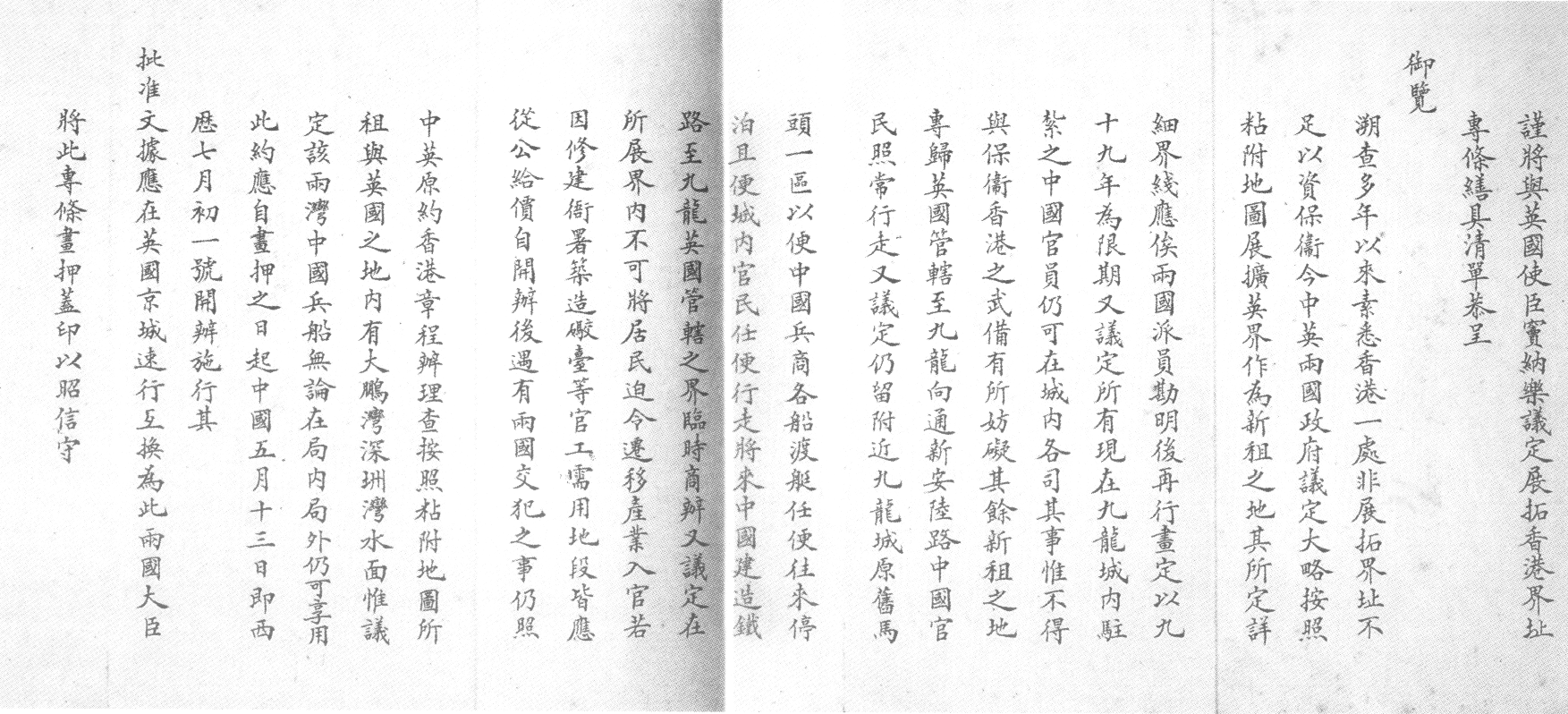
- Traditional Chinese: 中英展拓香港界址專條
- Simplified Chinese: 中英展拓香港界址专条
Transcriptions
Standard Mandarin
- Hanyu Pinyin: (Zhōng-Yīng) Zhǎntuò Xīanggǎng Jìezhǐ Zhuāntíao
- Wade–Giles: (Chung^{1}-Ying^{1}) Chan^{3}-t'o^{4} Hsiang^{1}-kang^{3} Chieh^{4}-chih^{3} Chuan^{1}-t'iao^{2}
Hakka
- Romanization: (Zung^{1}-Yin^{1}) Zien^{3}tok^{5} Hiong^{1}gong^{3} Gai^{4}zi^{3} Zon^{1}tiau^{2}
Yue: Cantonese
- Jyutping: (Zung^{1}-Jing^{1}) Zin^{2}tok^{3} Hoeng^{1}gong^{2} Gaai^{3}zi^{2} Zyun^{1}tiu^{4}

Britain acquired Hong Kong Island in 1842, Kowloon Peninsula in 1860, and leased the New Territories rent-free in 1898.

The Convention between the United Kingdom and China, Respecting an Extension of Hong Kong Territory, commonly known as the Convention for the Extension of Hong Kong Territory or the Second Convention of Peking, was a lease and unequal treaty signed between Qing China and the United Kingdom in Peking on 9 June 1898, leasing to the United Kingdom for 99 years, at no charge, the New Territories (as the area became known) and New Kowloon, including 235 islands.

== Background ==
In the Treaty of Nanking, in 1842, the Qing government agreed to make Hong Kong a Crown colony, ceding it 'in perpetuity', following the British victory in the First Opium War. During the second half of the 19th century, Britain had become concerned over the security of the isolated island, Hong Kong. Consequently, in Convention of Peking, following the British victory in the Second Opium War, Kowloon Peninsula was ceded to Britain.

Between 6 March and 8 April 1898, in the wake of China's defeat in the First Sino-Japanese War (1894–1895), the German government forced the Qing Empire into a 99-year lease of the Kiautschou Bay concession for a coaling station around Jiaozhou Bay on the southern coast of the Shandong Peninsula, to support a German global naval presence in direct opposition to the British network of global naval bases. This initiated the event known as the "scramble for concessions", which included a series of similar lease treaties with other European powers, such as:

- On 27 March 1898, the Convention for the Lease of the Liaotung Peninsula was signed between the Russian Empire and the Qing Empire, granting Russia a 25-year lease of Port Arthur and Dalian, to support Russia's Chinese Eastern Railway interests in Manchuria.
- Consequently, on 28 March 1898, Britain, anxious of the Russian presence in China, pressured the Qing Empire into leasing of Weihaiwei, which had been captured by the Empire of Japan in the Battle of Weihaiwei, the last major battle of the First Sino–Japanese War, for as long as the Russians occupying Port Arthur, to make checks and balances of Russia. During the negotiation, the British stated that they would further request for leasing of land if any foreign concession took place in Southern China.
- On 10 April 1898, France and Qing Empire signed a 99-year lease of Guangzhouwan to reinforce the position of French Indochina.

Seeking to strengthen the position of Hong Kong, Claude Maxwell MacDonald of the United Kingdom and plenipotentiaries of the Qing Empire reached agreement about allowing the expansion of Hong Kong for 200 miles (320 km). As a result, the Convention for the Extension of Hong Kong Territory was signed on 9 June 1898 in Beijing (Peking). The contract was signed to give the British full jurisdiction of the newly acquired land that was necessary to ensure proper military defence of the colony around the island.

Some of the earliest proposals for the land's usage in 1894 included cemetery space, an exercise ground for British troops as well as land for development. From the British perspective concerns over security and territorial defence provided the major impetus for the agreement.

== Terms ==
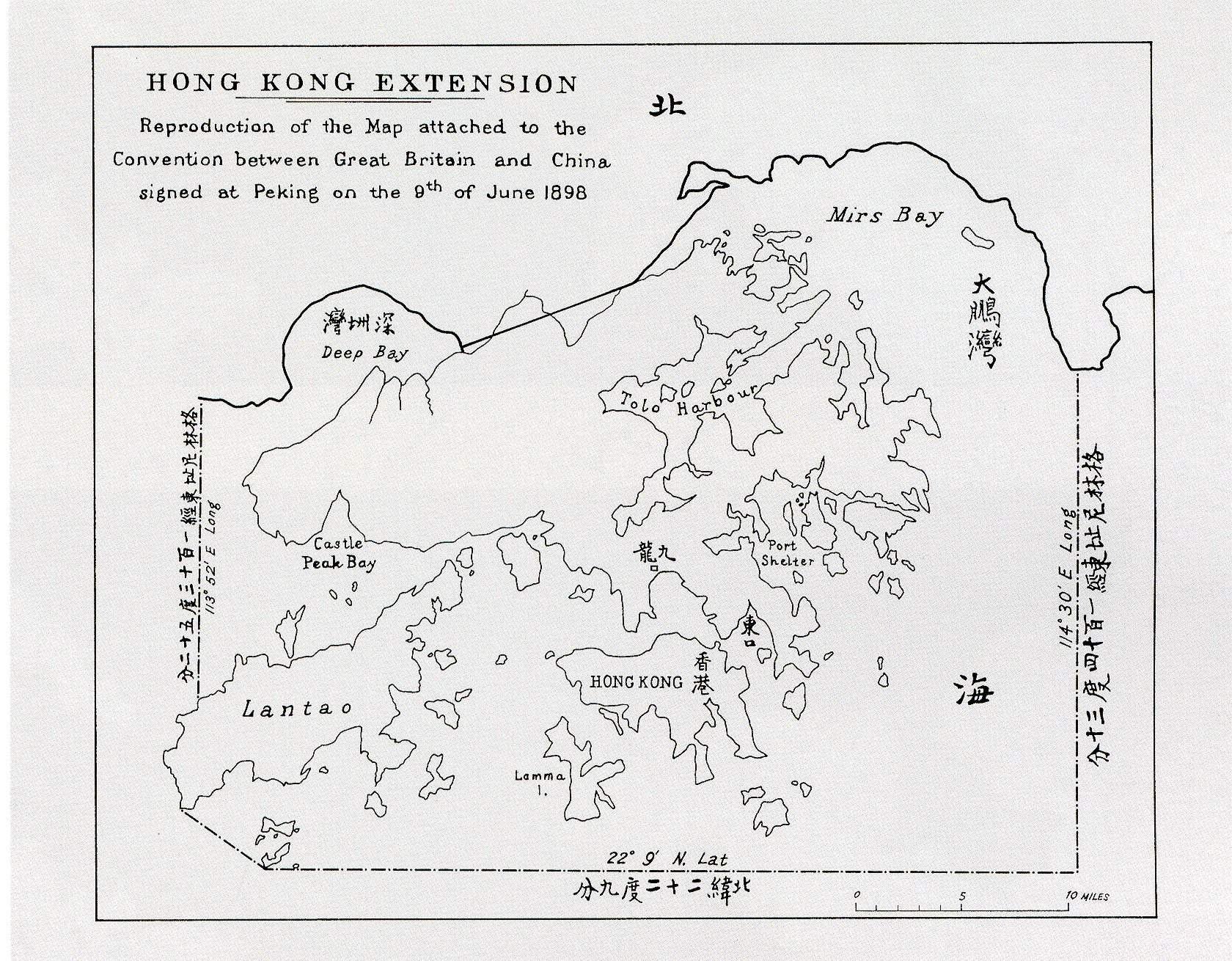
A reproduction map of the New Territories stipulated in the Convention for the Extension of Hong Kong Territory; the land boundary does not match the convention terms

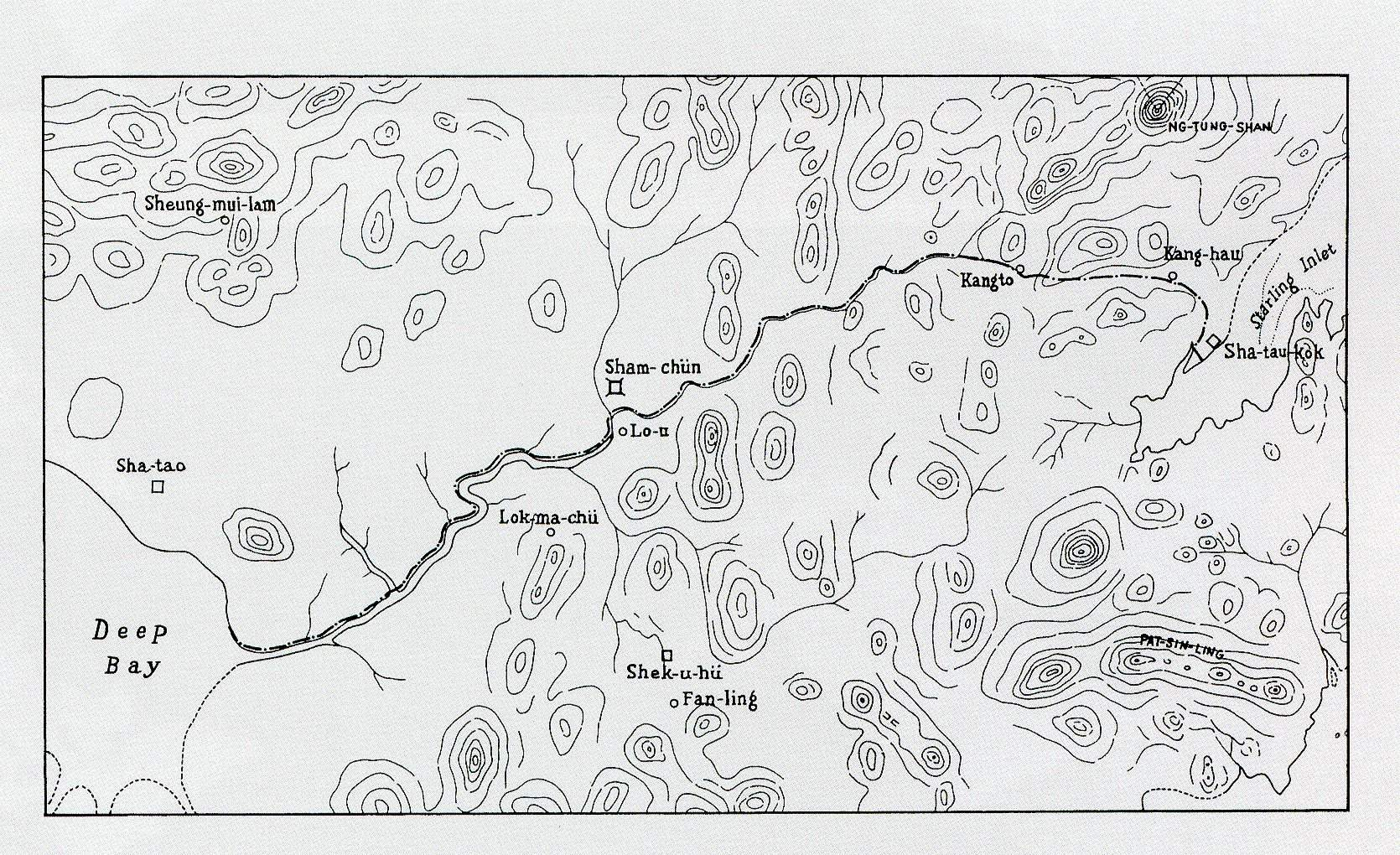
The land boundary of the New Territories stipulated in the Convention for the Extension of Hong Kong Territory

Under the convention the territories north of what is now Boundary Street and south of the Sham Chun River, and the surrounding islands, later known as the "New Territories" were leased to the United Kingdom for 99 years rent-free, expiring on 30 June 1997, and became part of the crown colony of Hong Kong. The Kowloon Walled City was exempt and remained under the control of Qing China. Under British law at the time, a 99-year lease was the maximum allowed for the lease of land. The territories which were leased to the United Kingdom were originally governed by Xin'an County, Guangdong province. Claude MacDonald, the British representative during the convention, picked a 99-year lease because he thought it was "as good as forever".

== Result ==
Some of the land under the convention remains rural and it is home to virtually all of Hong Kong's remaining farmland. However, as the city districts have become increasingly crowded the government has developed urban areas since the 1950s. Particularly, the areas closest to Kowloon have become integrated into Kowloon districts and are no longer administratively included in the New Territories. Due to continuing population growth and crowding in the inner city, the New Territories satellite cities grew increasingly important to the point where a slight majority of the population now lives there.

This made it unfeasible to return the leased land alone as it would have split Hong Kong into two parts. The Chinese also started to pressure the British to return all of Hong Kong, taking the position that they would not accept so-called "unequal treaties" that were imposed on them by colonial powers.

The governments of the United Kingdom and the People's Republic of China (PRC) concluded the Sino-British Joint Declaration in 1984, under which the sovereignty of the leased territories, together with Hong Kong Island and Kowloon (south of Boundary Street) ceded under the Treaty of Nanking (1842) and Convention of Peking (1860), was scheduled to be transferred to the PRC on 1 July 1997. The territory was then transferred as scheduled.

== End of agreement ==
The New Territories, with a 99-year lease, were the only territories forming the Crown colony of Hong Kong that were obliged by agreement to be returned. However, by the time of serious negotiations in the 1980s, it was seen as impractical to separate the ceded territories and return only the New Territories to China, due to the scarcity of resources in Hong Kong and Kowloon, and the large developments in the New Territories. Consequently, at midnight following the evening of 30 June 1997, the entire dependent territory of Hong Kong officially reverted to Chinese sovereignty, ending British rule there 156 years after it began.

== Copies ==
An original copy of the convention is currently located in the National Palace Museum in Taiwan.

== See also ==
- Indigenous inhabitants of the New Territories (Hong Kong)
- Imperialism in Asia
- Punti people in Hong Kong (also known as Weitou people)
- Hakka indigenous people in Hong Kong
- Tanka indigenous people in Hong Kong
- Hoklo indigenous people in Hong Kong
- Treaty of Nanking
- Convention of Peking
