= Greater Britain =

Outdated term for the British Empire

Greater Britain was a term that arose in the second half of the 19th century in British discourse about the British Empire. The term was used in different ways by different people and sometimes in different ways by the same person. Many were associated with the Imperial Federation League, a political grouping that encompassed political activists from a broad range of backgrounds in supporting a more active approach to the empire in the policies of the British government.

During the 20th century, Oswald Mosley revived the term with his book The Greater Britain, which was published by the British Union of Fascists in 1932 to launch his party. In 1964, far-right activist John Tyndall founded the Greater Britain Movement (GBM) and derived its name from Moseley's earlier book. Although Tyndall initially aimed to link up with other Neo-Nazis internationally, such open espousal of Nazism was disavowed in 1966, and the GBM was dissolved with Tyndall calling on its members to join the recently formed National Front.

== Late-19th-century debates ==
Duncan Bell has identified three principal meanings during this period:

1. The whole of the British Empire
2. The settler colonies within that empire
3. The English-speaking world, now called the anglosphere, including the United States

=== Greater Britain (1869) ===
The discourse was initiated by Charles Wentworth Dilke with the publication of Greater Britain: A Record of Travel in English-Speaking Countries During 1866-7. Dilkes begins the work by stating in its preface: "The idea which in all the length of my travels has been at once my fellow and my guide—a key wherewith to unlock the hidden things of strange new lands—is a conception, however imperfect, of the grandeur of our race, already girding the earth, which it is destined, perhaps, eventually to overspread". Dilke continues by arguing that "There are men who say that Britain in her age will claim the glory of having planted greater Englands across the seas. They fail to perceive that she has done more than found plantations of her own—that she has imposed her institutions upon the offshoots of Germany, of Ireland, of Scandinavia, and of Spain. Through America, England is speaking to the world".

He toured the United States shortly after the defeat of the Confederate States of America in the American Civil War and the passage of the Thirteenth Amendment, which abolished slavery.

In his final chapter he concludes: "In America we have seen the struggle of the dear races against the cheap—the endeavors of the English to hold their own against the Irish and Chinese. In New Zealand, we found the stronger and more energetic race pushing from the earth the shrewd and laborious descendants of the Asian Malays; in Australia, the English triumphant, and the cheaper races excluded from the soil not by distance merely, but by arbitrary legislation; in India, we saw the solution of the problem of the officering of the cheaper by the dearer race. Everywhere we have found that the difficulties which impede the progress to universal dominion of the English people lie in the conflict with the cheaper races. The result of our survey is such as to give us reason for the belief that race distinctions will long continue, that miscegenation will go but little way toward blending races; that the dearer are, on the whole, likely to destroy the cheaper peoples, and that Saxondom will rise triumphant from the doubtful struggle." (Chapter 23: The English)

=== The Defence of Great and Greater Britain (1880) ===
John Colomb produced The Defence of Great and Greater Britain after the announcement of the Royal Commission Appointed to Enquire into the Defence of British Possessions and Commerce Abroad in 1879. Chapter II was published in The British Trade Journal in 1872. Chapter III and IV were read before the Royal Colonial Institute in 1873 and 1877. Chapters V and VI were read before the Royal United Services Institute in 1879.

== Sources ==
- Bell, D. (2007) The Idea of Greater Britain: Empire and the Future of World Order, 1860-1900. Oxford: Princeton University.
- Dr Duncan Bell and Prof Stephen Howe. Greater Britain. Online at: https://www.youtube.com/watch?v=qeGYaUFf83I
