= Royal Commission Appointed to Enquire into the Defence of British Possessions and Commerce Abroad =

The Royal Commission Appointed to Enquire into the Defence of British Possessions and Commerce Abroad was a British Royal Commission appointed on 8 September 1879 under the chairmanship of Lord Carnarvon. The Commission produced "the first comprehensive study of Imperial defence".

Since 1870, both Russia and France were considered potential enemies, and in 1875, the Admiralty asked the War Office to investigate the problems surrounding the defence of British naval bases across the globe. William Jervois submitted a report in which he recommended measures for the defence of the naval bases and ports of the British Empire. In March 1878, the Colonial Defence Committee was appointed in the aftermath of a Russian war scare. This investigated the defence of ports of strategic value and reported in April 1879. Due to these reports and their recommendations, the Royal Commission was appointed to enquire into the defence of British possessions and commerce abroad.

John Colomb characterised the fundamental objects of the Commission as being:

1. "To inquire and report on the steps necessary to adopt to ensure that in war the people of these islands shall not be starved into submission, and that the communications of Great with Greater Britain shall not be cut".
2. "To consider how the burden of cost resulting from taking these necessary steps should be apportioned between Great and Greater Britain?"

The three Reports of the Commission were submitted on 3 September 1881, 23 March 1882, and 22 July 1882. Due to their sensitive subject matter, none of these Reports were published. They found that the annual value of the seaborne trade of Britain's colonies was £367,000,000, with half consisting of trade with Britain and the other half of trade with foreign countries and between themselves.

They argued that the Royal Navy needed more fortified coaling stations to enable it to take the offensive in war and that these would also help to prevent the invasion of British territory. They also recommended that merchant ship owners should be encouraged to observe construction regulations by ensuring that their ships were ready for naval gun-mounting; this would enable them to be converted into auxiliary cruisers in wartime.

The Reports urged that naval rearmament was vital and that the cost should be shouldered by the Australian colonies as well as Britain. They noted that whereas defence expenditure per head in 1879 was 15s. 7½d. in the United Kingdom, it was only 2s. 4d. in New South Wales, 1s. 9¾d. in South Australia, 1s. 9d. in New Zealand, less than 1s. in Queensland and Tasmania and nothing in Western Australia.
