= Government rent in Hong Kong =

Government rent in Hong Kong started on July 1, 1997, with the inception of the Joint Declaration. It said that new land grants contain a standard condition that the lessee is required to pay an annual rent, equal to 3% of the rateable value from time to time of the land leased.

== The Joint Declaration ==
The Sino-British Joint Declaration on the Question of Hong Kong ("the Joint Declaration") was signed between the Chinese and British Governments on 19 December 1984. It came into force on 27 May 1985. The Joint Declaration sets out in its Annex III provisions in regard to, inter alia (among other things), the grant of new land leases and the extension of non-renewable land leases.

In accordance with Annex III to the Joint Declaration, between 27 May 1985 and 30 June 1997, new leases of land were granted by the Hong Kong Government for a term expiring not later than 30 June 2047. Such leases were granted at a premium and nominal rent until 30 June 1997, after which date the lessees did not need to pay an additional premium but were required to pay an annual rent equivalent to 3% of the rateable value of the property at that date, adjusted in step with any changes in the rateable value thereafter.

Annex III also provided that non-renewable leases expiring before 30 June 1997, except short term tenancies and special purpose leases, might be extended if the lessee so wished, for a period expiring not later than 30 June 2047 without payment of an additional premium. An annual rent would be charged from the date of extension equivalent to 3% of the rateable value of the property at that date, adjusted in step with any changes in the rateable value thereafter.

For leases not having a right of renewal expiring after 30 June 1997, Annex III provides that they should be dealt with in accordance with the relevant land laws and policies of the Hong Kong Special Administrative Region.

== New Territories Leases (Extension) Ordinance (Cap. 150, Laws of Hong Kong) ==
Most of the non-renewable leases referred to in Annex III to the Joint Declaration are in respect of land in the New Territories (including New Kowloon). There were at that time over 30,000 leases of land in the New Territories, many of them in multiple ownership, and in practice it would have been impossible to extend each of them individually. The only practical way of extending so many leases at about the same time was by legislation and this led to the enactment of the New Territories Leases (Extension) Ordinance (cap. 150 of the Laws of Hong Kong) in 1988.

Section 6 of the Ordinance provided automatic extension of all New Territories leases to 30 June 2047, without payment of any additional premium but the lessees were required under Section 8 to pay an annual rent at 3% of the rateable value from time to time of the land leased. However the relevant provisions on the new rent payable and on rent exemption were later repealed and incorporated into the Government Rent (Assessment and Collection) Ordinance (cap. 515 of the Laws of Hong Kong) enacted in 1997.

== The Basic Law ==
The Basic Law of the Hong Kong Special Administrative Region of the People's Republic of China came into force on 1 July 1997 and gives effect to the land policies enshrined in the Joint Declaration.

Article 120
All leases of land granted, decided upon or renewed before the establishment of the Hong Kong Special Administrative Region which extend beyond 30 June 1997, and all rights in relation to such leases, shall continue to be recognised and protected under the law of the Region.

Article 121
As regards all leases of land granted or renewed where the original leases contain no right of renewal, during the period from 27 May 1985 to 30 June 1997, which extend beyond 30 June 1997 and expire not later than 30 June 2047, the lessee is not required to pay an additional premium as from 1 July 1997, but an annual rent equivalent to 3% of the rateable value of the property at that date, adjusted in step with any changes in the rateable value thereafter, shall be charged.

Article 122
In the case of old schedule lots, village lots, small houses and similar rural holdings, where the property was on 30 June 1984 held by, or, in the case of small houses granted after that date, where the property is granted to, a lessee descended through the male line from a person who was in 1898 a resident of an established village in Hong Kong, the previous rent shall remain unchanged so long as the property is held by that lessee or by one of his lawful successors in the male line.

Article 123
Where leases of land without a right of renewal expire after the establishment of the Hong Kong Special Administrative Region, they shall be dealt with in accordance with laws and policies formulated by the Region on its own.

== Land Grant Arrangement since 1 July 1997 ==
Shortly after the reunification and the establishment of the Government of the Hong Kong Special Administrative Region (HKSAR), the Government formulated its first land policy according to Annex III of the Joint Declaration. On 15 July 1997, the Executive Council endorsed various provisions covering land leases and related matters.

Among other things, new leases of land to be granted (except new special purpose leases and short term tenancies) should be for a term of 50 years from the date of grant at a premium, and subject to the payment, from the commencement of the lease, of an annual rent equivalent to 3% of the rateable value from time to time of the land leased.

Non-renewable leases may, upon expiry and at the sole discretion of HKSAR Government, be extended for a term of 50 years without payment of an additional premium, but an annual rent shall be charged from the date of extension equivalent to 3% of the rateable value from time to time of the property.

== Government Rent (Assessment and Collection) Ordinance (Cap. 515, Laws of Hong Kong) ==
Since the coming into force of the Joint Declaration, new land grants contain a standard condition that the lessee is required to pay an annual rent, from 1 July 1997, equal to 3% of the rateable value from time to time of the land leased. But, neither Cap. 150 nor the conditions of Government land leases provide sufficient details regarding the assessment, payment and collection of Government rent, or any rights for the rent payer to make objection and appeal against the assessment. To help administer the assessment and collection of Government rent, the Government Rent (Assessment and Collection) Ordinance (cap. 515 of the Laws of Hong Kong) (hereinafter referred to as the “Rent Ordinance”) was enacted on 30 May 1997 and, under Section 34, a subsidiary legislation, the Government Rent (Assessment and Collection) Regulation, was made on 6 June 1997 to codify and standardise the practices and procedures for assessment and collection of Government rent.

The Rent Ordinance applies to interests in land held under –

(a) a lease extended by the operation of Section 6 of the New Territories Leases (Extension) Ordinance, Cap. 150; and

(b) a lease under which there is an express obligation to pay an annual rent of an amount equal to 3% of the rateable value from time to time of the land leased.

== Different Types of Government Rent ==
As from 1 July 1997, there are generally four different types of Government rent collected from different leaseholders depending on the terms of their respective Government leases, namely,

(a) zone Government rent, which is usually a nominal amount, payable throughout the lease term as stipulated in the Government lease;

(b) Government rent payable during the renewal term of a renewable Government lease which is subject to the application of the Government Leases Ordinance, Cap. 40;

(c) Government rent equal to 5% of the rateable value from time to time of the land leased, which is assessable under the Rent Ordinance-; and

(d) concessionary Government rent, which is usually a nominal amount, payable for qualifying interests held by New Territories indigenous villagers continuously since 30 June 1984, as provided for under the Rent Ordinance.

The Lands Department of the HKSAR is responsible for the collection of zone and concessionary Government rents, i.e. types (a) and (d) above. For Government rent of type (b), the Rating and Valuation Department of the HKSAR is responsible for assessing the rent and notifying the Lands Department of the assessment for billing and collection. For further details of the collection of these three types of Government rent, please visit the Lands Department's website http://www.landsd.gov.hk/en/about/welcome.htm. The Rent Ordinance is administered by the Rating and Valuation Department, which is solely responsible for the assessment and collection of Government rent of type (c).

=== Government Leases Ordinance (Cap. 40, Laws of Hong Kong) ===
Background

Renewable leases of land contain a right of renewal for a further term, exercisable by the lessee, at “a rent to be fixed by the Director of Public Works as the fair and reasonable rental value of the land at the date of such renewal”. This practice of granting renewable leases was first introduced in the 1880s. Generally, the lease terms were 75 years renewable for a further 75 years or 99 years renewable for a further 99 years.

However, sharp increases in property rents in the early 1970s gave rise to strong opposition from leaseholders to the payment of the full market rental value of the land, as required by the lease conditions, for the renewal term. In view of this situation, Government introduced a number of alternative methods of renewal. Finally, on 14 December 1973, the Crown Leases Ordinance, now re-titled the Government Leases Ordinance (cap. 40 of the Laws of Hong Kong), came into operation. The Ordinance provided that for the renewal term, a leaseholder should pay an annual rent equivalent to 3% of the rateable value of the land at the date of renewal of the lease. The Cap. 40 rent so assessed would remain unchanged throughout the renewal term unless and until the land was redeveloped, in which case it would be re-assessed at 3% of the rateable value of the interim valuation of the new building erected on the land.

== Administration of the Government Rent (Assessment and Collection) Ordinance (Cap. 515, Laws of Hong Kong) ==
=== Liability for Payment ===
Section 6 of the Rent Ordinance provides that the lessee of a Government lease, which is subject to the application of the Ordinance (hereinafter referred to as the “applicable lease”), is liable to pay Government rent. The lessee for this purpose includes the owner of an undivided share in the land leased. Where undivided shares of the land have been assigned to individual tenements in the building erected on the land and the tenements have been assessed to rates, the Commissioner is authorised to demand the Government rent from ratepayers of the tenements by issuing combined demand notes for rates and Government rent, even though the ratepayers may not be the owners of the tenements. If a person other than the owner of a tenement pays the Government rent for the tenement, the rent paid by the person is a debt due to the person by the owner unless there is an express agreement between the owner and the person requiring otherwise.

=== Rateable Value of Land Leased ===
Section 7 provides that the rateable value of the land leased under an applicable lease is an aggregate of the rateable values of the tenements comprised in the land leased.

=== Valuation of Land and Tenements ===
Section 8 empowers the Commissioner to value land held under an applicable lease and any tenement comprised therein at any time to ascertain the rateable value for the purposes of the Ordinance. Subject to any specific provisions of the Ordinance, the basis of ascertaining the rateable value is the same as that in Sections 7 and 7A of the Rating Ordinance. Where the estimated rateable value does not exceed the minimum rateable value, the rateable value shall be deemed to be $1 and no demand for Government rent will be issued. That minimum rateable value, presently set at $3,000, is the same as the amount prescribed under Section 36(1)(l) of the Rating Ordinance for rates exemption purposes.

=== Assessability of Development and Redevelopment Sites ===
Where a site is vacant pending development or redevelopment or is undergoing development or redevelopment, the site is not assessable to rates. However, the site is assessable to Government rent by virtue of Section 8 of the Rent Ordinance and Sections 2 and 4 of the Government Rent (Assessment and Collection) Regulation. The legality of assessing development sites and redevelopment sites to Government rent was confirmed by the Court of Final Appeal in its judgment in Commissioner of Rating and Valuation v Agrila Limited & 58 others [2001] FACV Nos. 1 and 2 of 2000.

=== Government Rent Roll ===
The provisions in the Rent Ordinance regarding the direction for the Commissioner to prepare a new Government Rent Roll, the designation of a valuation reference date, the particulars of tenements entered into the Government Rent Roll, the form of the Government Rent Roll and the display of the Government Rent Roll for public inspection are similar to those for the Valuation List under the Rating Ordinance.

=== Collection of Government Rent ===
The Commissioner is responsible for the collection of Government rent payable under the Rent Ordinance and the Director of Lands is responsible for taking enforcement action in case of default in payment. The Director of Lands may take proceedings to re-enter the land should the Government rent for the land or any surcharges thereon remain unpaid.

Similar to the frequency of demanding rates under the Rating Ordinance, Government rent is payable quarterly in advance to the Commissioner in the first month of each quarter. Where the Government rent has not been paid on or before the due date, a surcharge of 5% may be added to the amount due and, if not paid within 6 months from the original due date, a further surcharge of 10% will be added on all amounts outstanding.

=== Objections and Appeals ===
The provisions in the Rent Ordinance regarding proposals to alter the Government Rent Roll, objections to correction, deletion or interim valuation and appeals to the Lands Tribunal against the decision of the Commissioner are similar to those provided under the Rating Ordinance.

=== General Powers of Commissioner ===
The provisions in the Rent Ordinance and the Rating Ordinance are generally the same in respect of the power to obtain information from the owner or the occupier of a tenement, the power to extend the time limit for returning a requisition for particulars of tenements, the commission of offences for refusal to give information or obstruction or provision of false or incorrect information, and the penalties for such offences.

=== Comparison of Rates and Government Rent under Cap. 515 ===
A schedule comparing the similarities and differences between rates and Government rent is set out in the following table. Comparison of Rates and Government Rent

Subject	Rates	Government Rent
1. Legislation	Rating Ordinance (Cap. 116, Laws of Hong Kong)	Government Rent (Assessment and Collection) Ordinance (Cap. 515, Laws of Hong Kong)
2. Nature	Tax levied on property	Rent payable under Government land lease
3. Basis of Assessment	Rateable Value(subject to revaluation)	Rateable Values(subject to revaluation)
4. Percentage Charge	Determined by Legislative Council annually	Stipulated at 3% under the Sino-British Joint Declaration and adopted in all new leases granted since 27 May 1985
5. Amount Payable	Prescribed % of rateable value	5% of rateable value
6. Register	Valuation List	Government Rent Roll
7. Liability	Owner & occupier jointly liable	Leaseholder (i.e. owner)
8. Demand Notes	Single demand for rates and Government rent	Single demand for rates and Government rent
9. Collection	Payable quarterly in advance	Payable quarterly in advance
10. Surcharge for Late Payment	5% after due date, 10% on total outstanding amount after 6 months	5% after due date, 10% on total outstanding amount after 6 months
11. Arrears & Enforcement	A debt to Government with power to lay a charge against the property	A debt to Government with power to re-enter the land
12. Concessions	Rates rebate usually with a ceiling Waiver of surcharges	No concession
13. Exemption	Agricultural land, public worship, etc.	Qualifying rural holdings owned by indigenous villagers or their lawful successors

== Government Rent Case Law ==
Legality to assess Development and Redevelopment Sites to Government rent
Agrila Limited and 58 Others v CRV
LDGA 5-32/98 etc. (LT)
CACV 107/99 (Court of Appeal)
FACV 1 & 2/2000 (Court of Final Appeal)

For Government rent purposes, rateable values (RVs) can be determined for properties not liable to rates or exempt from assessment to rates. CRV is legitimate to ascertain RVs of agricultural land and for site under construction. The amount of RV is to be determined by the Lands Tribunal based on rebus sic stantibus principle and having regard to all the intrinsic characteristics of each property. The use of Last Ascertained RV as the RV of leased land before redevelopment is not in conflict with the Basic Law.

Best Origin Limited v CRV
LDGA 14/1998 (LT)
CACV 67/2008 (Court of Appeal)
For the purposes of determining Government rent fixed under Cap. 515, the Lands Tribunal accepted the Commissioner's assessment of the rateable value of a development site determined by a contractor's basis valuation.
