= Hong Kong Regiment =

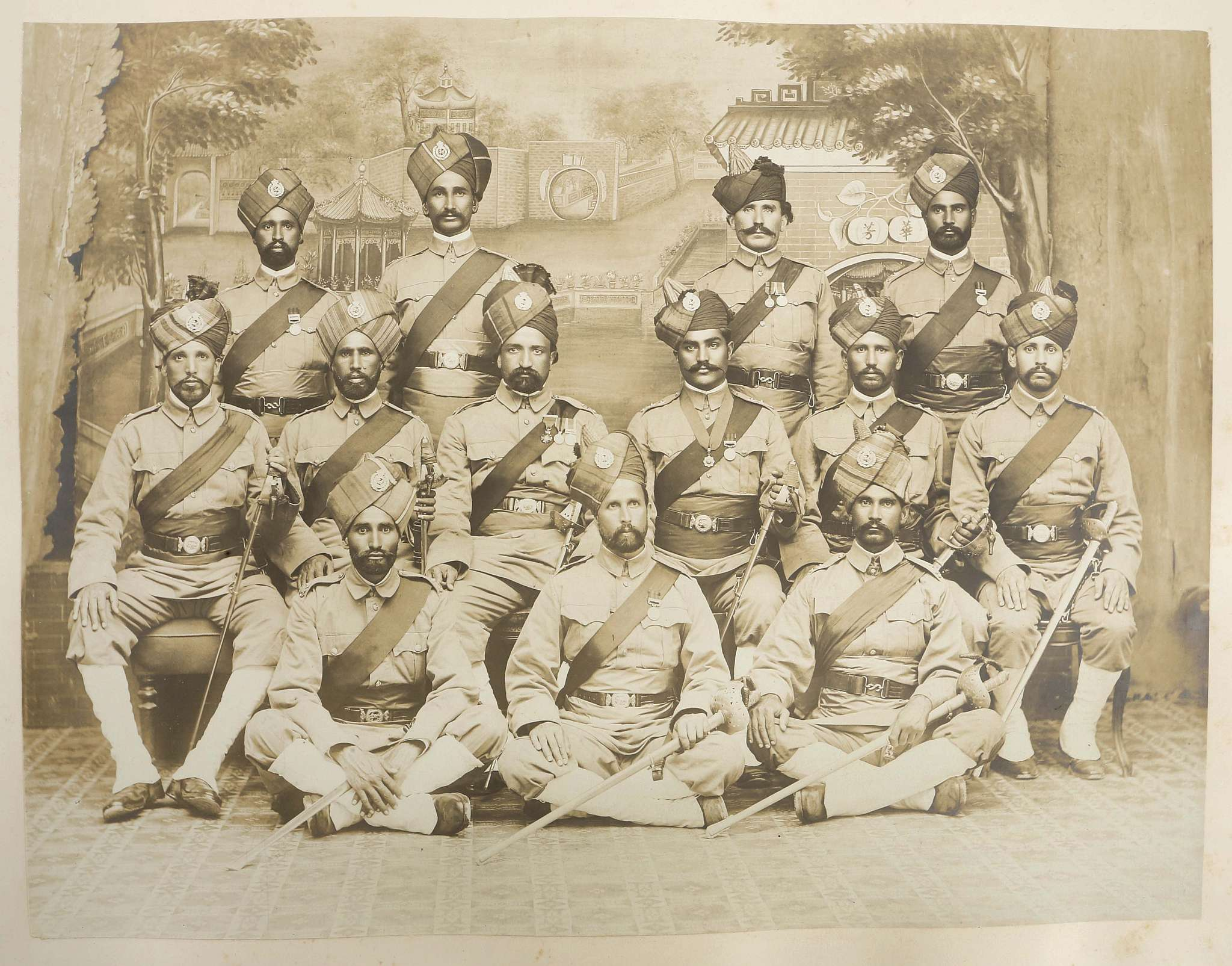
- Active: 1891–1902
- Disbanded: 1902
- Country: (British Raj) British India
- Allegiance: British Indian Army
- Branch: Army
- Type: infantry
- Role: Garrison force
- Garrison/HQ: British Hong Kong
- Nickname: "The Swagger Regiment"
- Engagements: Six-Day War (1899); Boxer Rebellion

The Hong Kong Regiment was a British Indian Army regiment seconded to the British Army intended to form part of the garrison of British Hong Kong between 1891 and 1902. It was disbanded in 1902 following a request from the India Office owing to the cost of the regiment.

== History ==
The Hong Kong Regiment was created as a result of an 1886 recommendation for an extra battalion to join the Hong Kong Military Service Corps in garrisoning Hong Kong. The regiment was recruited by the British Indian Army from native Indians from Upper India and the regiment was seconded to the British Army. They first arrived in Hong Kong in 1892. Upon arrival, they received authorisation from their British officers to help with the funding and rebuilding of the Kowloon Mosque for the "Mohammedans of Upper India".

The soldiers of the Hong Kong Regiment received high praise on their standards of drill and soldiering. The first recruits were apparently so good at firing that the Commandant of the School of Musketry said there was "little we could teach them". A report in The Daily Telegraph described it as a "Swagger Regiment", and the Commander-in-Chief of the Forces, Lord Roberts praised them highly during their first inspection, which was commonly repeated by the Governors of Hong Kong.

In 1897 the regiment was deployed to suppress disturbances in the newly acquired New Territories. Khaki drill was worn for ordinary duties (see photo above) but a scarlet and blue full dress uniform was authorised for cold-weather ceremonial.

The regiment saw action during the Boxer Rebellion and was a main part of the relief of Peking. However in 1902, the India Office demanded that the regiment be disbanded owing to the cost of maintaining them, as the soldiers were better paid than other regiments of the British Raj and as a result were able to select which recruits they took on. This request was accepted, with the regiment's soldiers being transferred to the newly renamed 67th Punjabis. Their colours were laid up at St John's Cathedral, Hong Kong, though they were later lost during the Japanese occupation of Hong Kong.
