= The British Trade Journal =

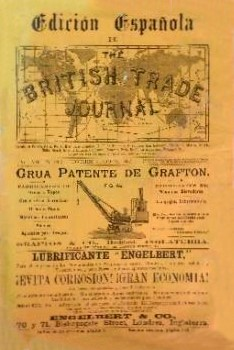
The British Trade Journal. 1887 Spanish edition

The British Trade Journal was a commercial journal founded in 1863 as Morgans' British Trade Journal, and Export Price Current. It became The British Trade Journal in 1870 and changed its name to the British Trade Journal and Export World in 1929. It ceased publication in December 1967.

The journal was concerned with all aspects of import and export, tariffs and trade policy. It reviewed books and products and its columns provided material for humorous pieces in the Pall Mall Gazette, Punch and other journals. It described the latest scientific discoveries and its advertising provided engravings of the latest manufactured goods which reviewers found useful.
