= Kowloon Peninsula =

Heavily populated peninsula of mainland Hong Kong

Kowloon Peninsula 九龍半島
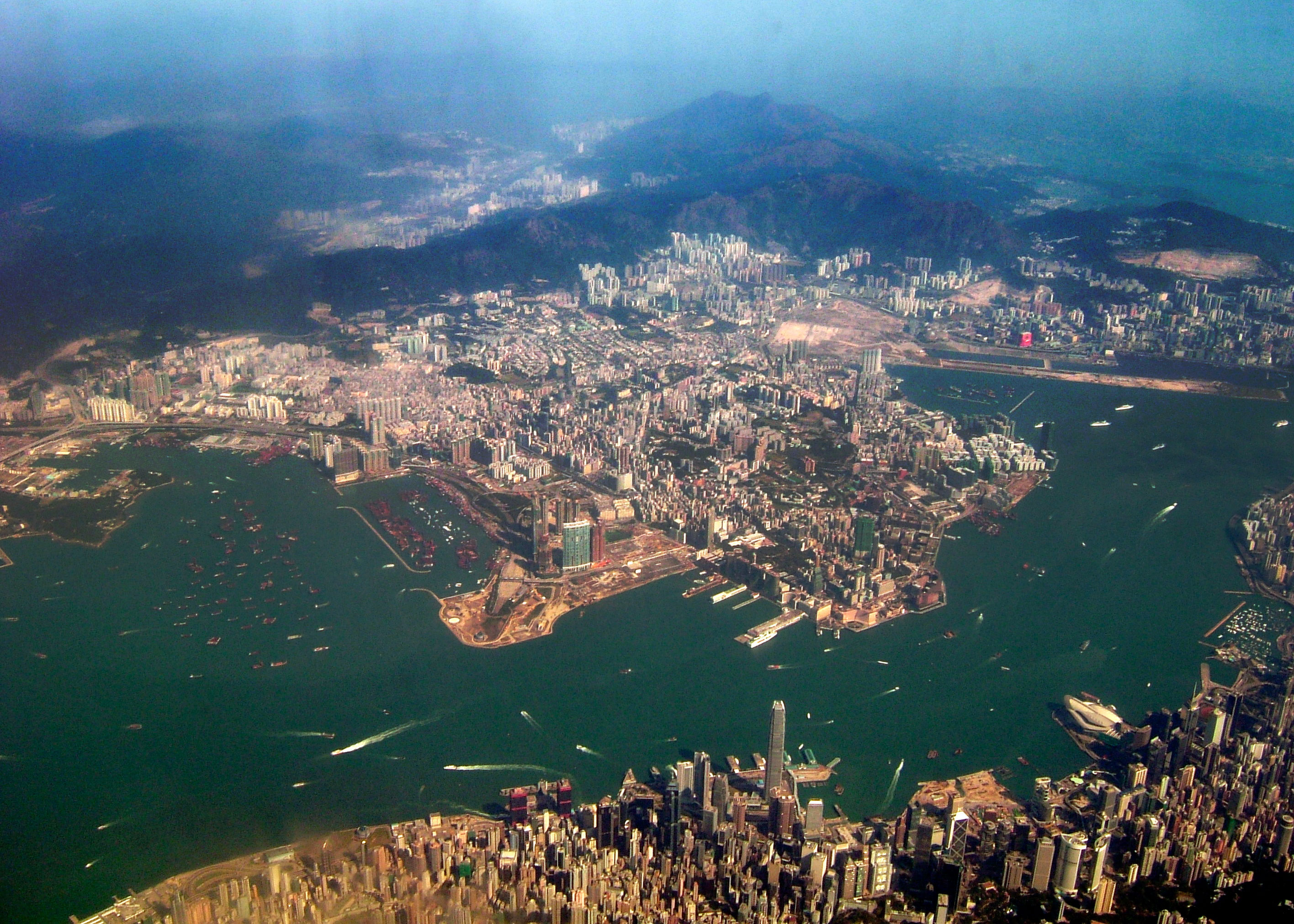
- An aerial view of Kowloon Peninsula from Hong Kong Island in 2006

- Coordinates: 22.31°N 114.18°E
- Time zone: UTC+8 (Hong Kong Time)

Kowloon Peninsula
- Traditional Chinese: 九龍半島
- Simplified Chinese: 九龙半岛
Transcriptions
Standard Mandarin
- Hanyu Pinyin: jiǔ lóng bàn dǎo
Hakka
- Romanization: Giu^{3}lung^{2} Ban^{4}Dau^{3}
Yue: Cantonese
- Jyutping: gau^{2}lung^{4} bun^{3}dou^{2}
- IPA: [kɐ̌ulʊ̏ŋ pʊ̄ntǒu]

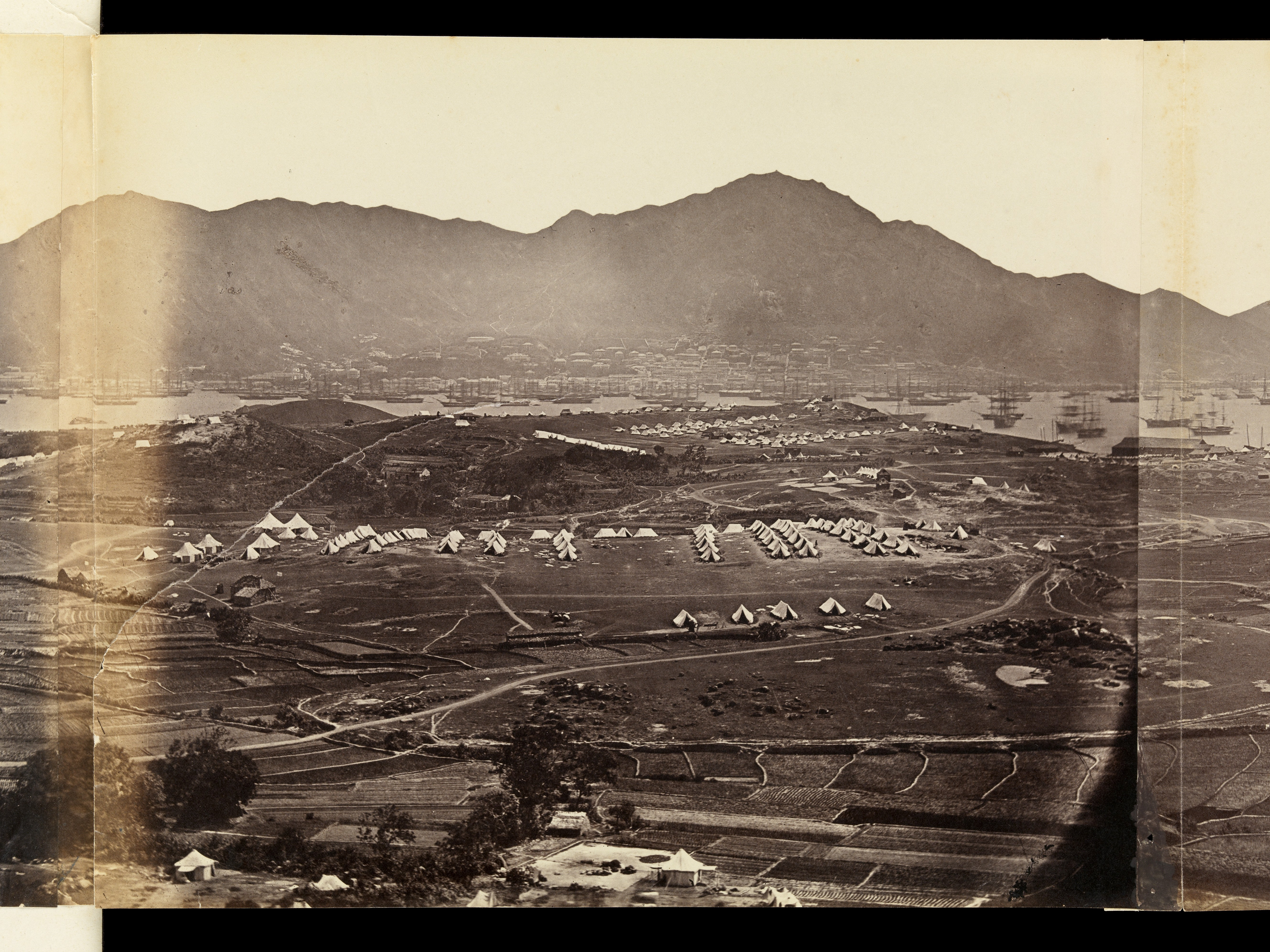
Military encampments on Kowloon Peninsula in 1860, looking south toward Hong Kong Island.

The Kowloon Peninsula is a peninsula that is part of the southern part of the main landmass in the territory of Hong Kong, alongside Victoria Harbour and facing toward Hong Kong Island. The Kowloon Peninsula and Ngong Shuen Chau comprises the Old Kowloon. The Old Kowloon and the area of New Kowloon are collectively known as Kowloon.

Geographically, the term "Kowloon Peninsula" may also refer to the area south of the mountain ranges of Beacon Hill, Lion Rock, Tate's Cairn, Kowloon Peak, etc. The peninsula covers five of the eighteen districts of Hong Kong. Kowloon Bay is located at the northeast of the peninsula.

== Geology and reclamation ==
The main rock type of the peninsula consists of a medium grained monzogranite with some fine granite outcrops, part of the Kowloon Granite. Early maps and photographs show flat, low-lying land behind the beach of Tsim Sha Tsui Bay with a raised area, Kowloon Hill, in the west.

The peninsula has been significantly expanded through land reclamation from the sea, over several phases. In the south and west most of the reclamation was carried out before 1904. Reclamation in several other small areas along the main Tsim Sha Tsui waterfront was completed by 1982. Since 1994, parts of the Hung Hom Bay were reclaimed and by 2019, it had been completely extinguished. The West Kowloon Reclamation was formed as part of the Airport Core Programme and largely completed by 1995.

== History ==
Before the actual Kowloon boundaries were established, the Kowloon Peninsula served as one of the first destinations for escape during China's dynastic times. In 1287, the last emperor of the Song dynasty, Emperor Bing was fleeing from the Mongol leader Kublai Khan. Taking refuge in a cave in the Kowloon peninsula, the inscription wrote "Sung Wong Toi" or "Song Emperor's Pavilion". In the 17th century, after the fall of the Ming dynasty, many of the Emperor's followers also found shelter in the Kowloon peninsula to hide from the Manchus. Britain's occupation of Kowloon was similarly initiated in 1860 for the ostensible reason of policing against "thieves", "outlaws", and "marauders" who raided Hong Kong and then fled to the peninsula for sanctuary.

In the later half of the 19th century, Kowloon Peninsula usually referred to British Kowloon, the territory ceded in 1860 as part of a lease subsequently incorporated into the Convention of Peking ending the Second Opium War. This was set by a line east from the fort at the northernmost point of Stonecutters Island, first demarcated by a bamboo palisade and now by Boundary Street. Kowloon Peninsula had a population of 800 when it was ceded to the British Empire in 1860.

In 1898 a resolution was passed by the colonial Hong Kong Legislative Council to preserve the land around Sung Wong Toi.

Geographically and presently, the peninsula is reckoned as the land south of the mountain ranges of Lion Rock, Kowloon Peak, and adjacent hills.

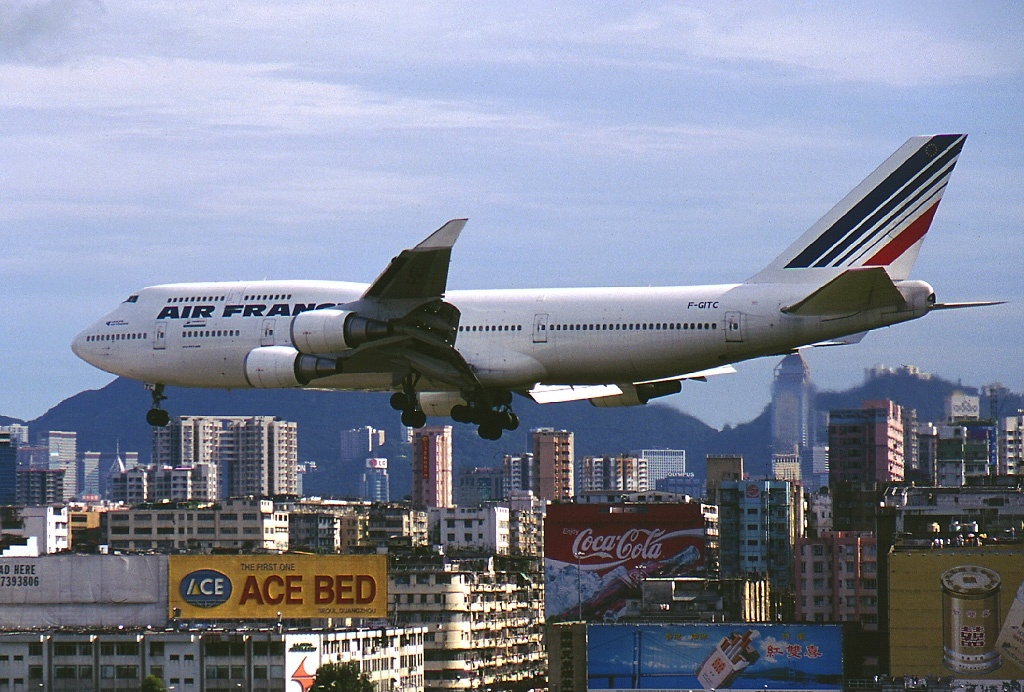
An Air France Boeing 747 passing above Kowloon, landing at the old airport.

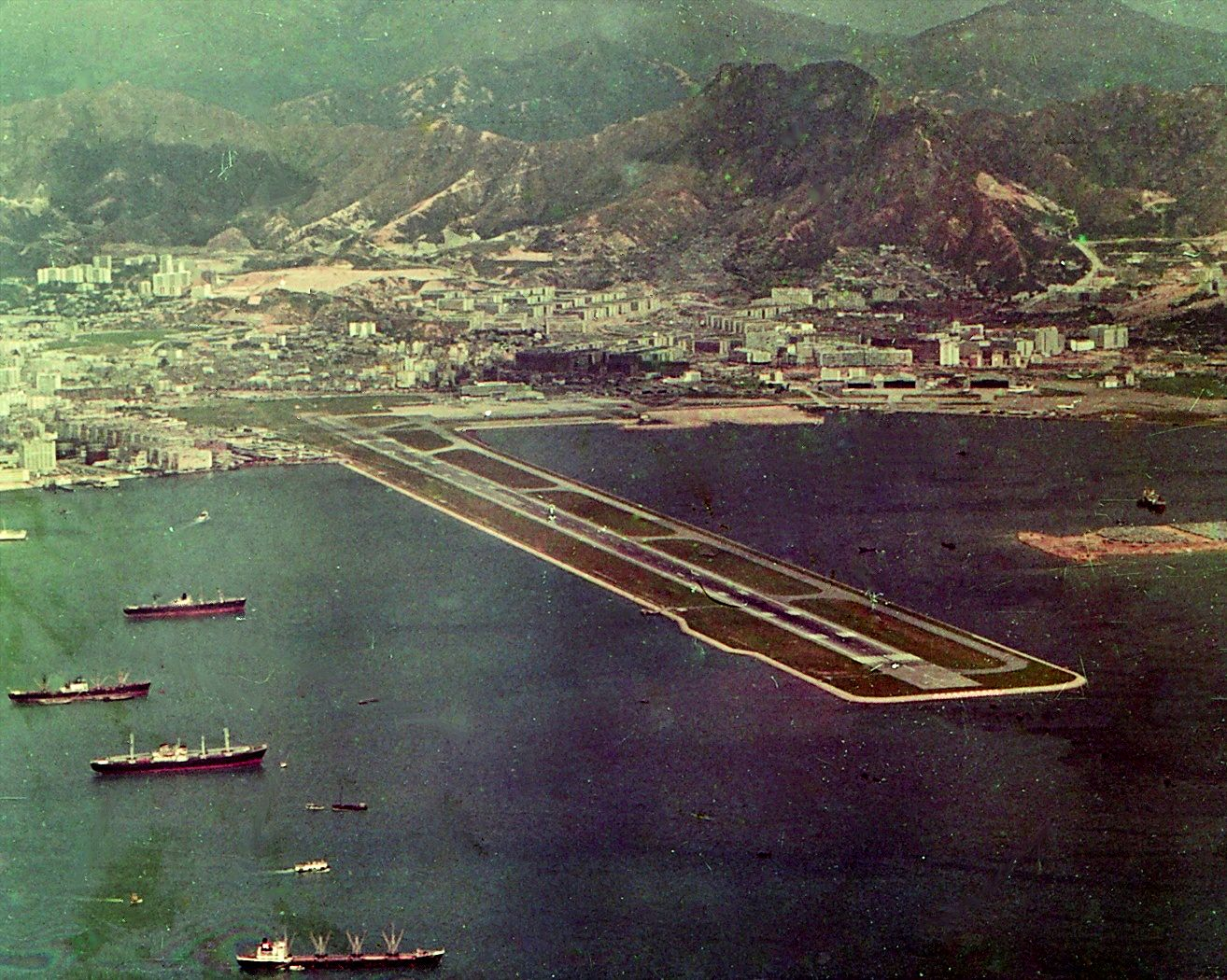
Hong Kong's old airport, Kai Tak, was located in Kowloon.

== City landscape ==
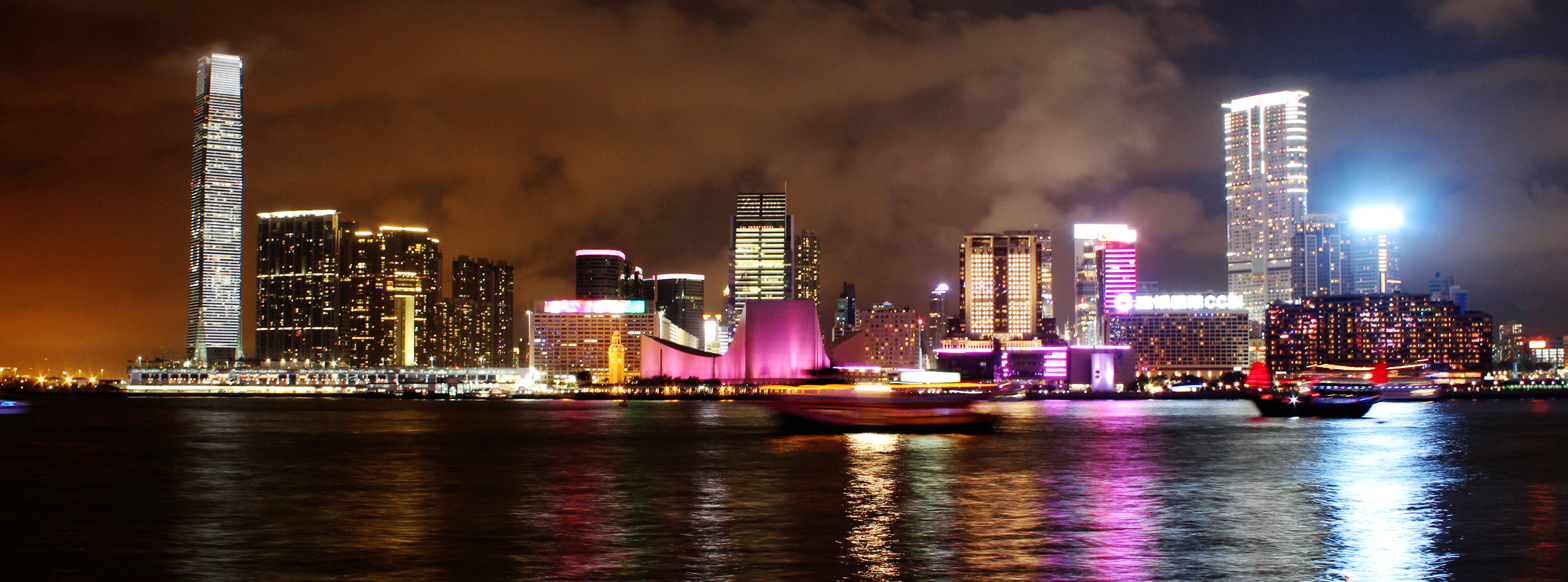
A view of Kowloon Peninsula taken from Hong Kong Island.

== See also ==
- Boundary Street
- Kowloon
- List of islands and peninsulas of Hong Kong
- List of places in Hong Kong
- New Kowloon
