= Boundary Street =

Street in Kowloon, Hong Kong

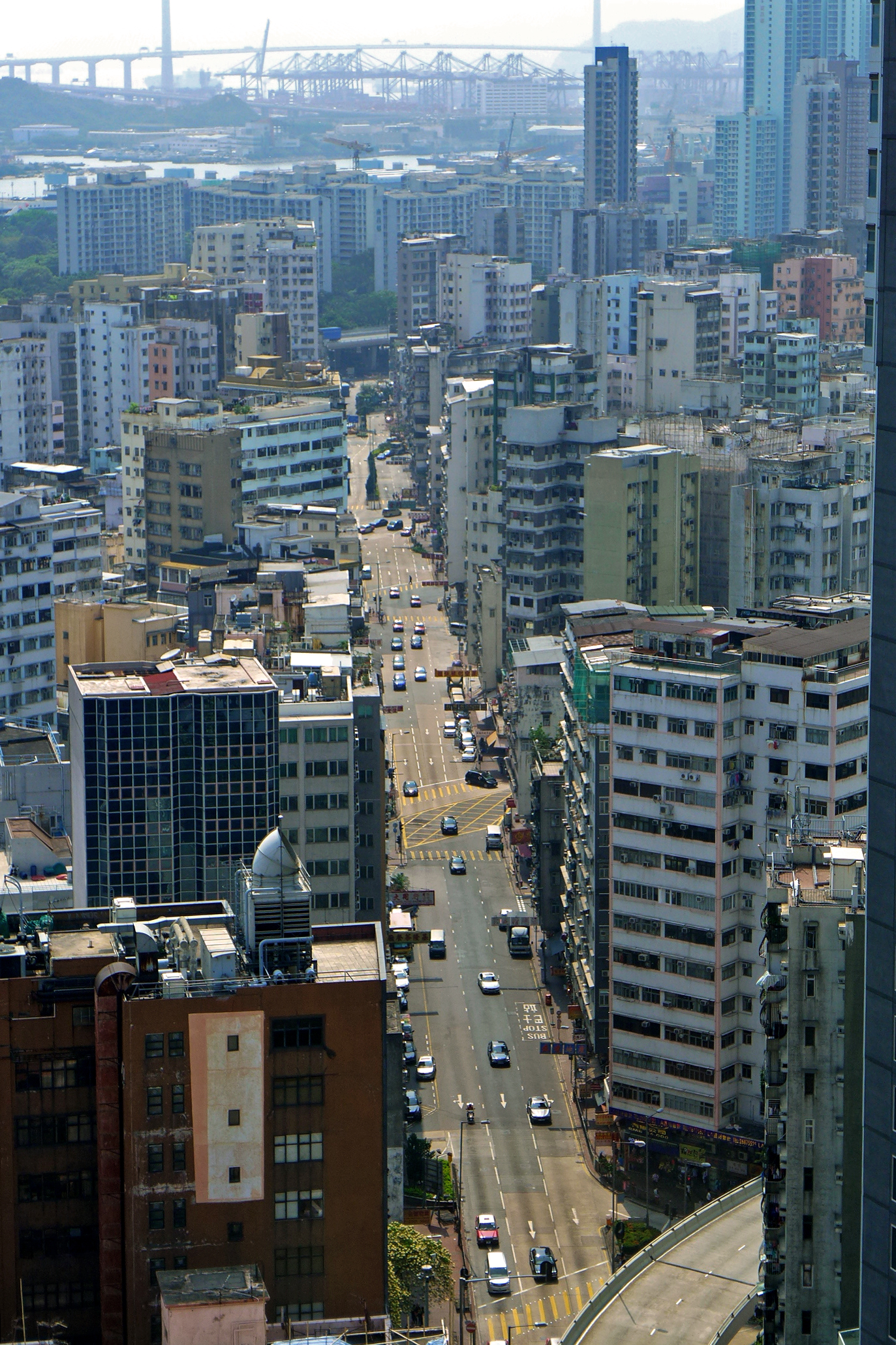
- Boundary Street near Prince Edward, Hong Kong
- Interactive map of Boundary Street
- Native name: 界限街 (Yue Chinese)
- Former name: Old Frontier Line
- Location: Kowloon, Hong Kong
- Coordinates: 22°19′35.71″N 114°10′4.40″E

Boundary Street
- Chinese: 界限街
Transcriptions
Standard Mandarin
- Hanyu Pinyin: Jièxiàn Jiē
Hakka
- Romanization: Gai^{4}han^{4} Gai^{1}
Yue: Cantonese
- Yale Romanization: Gaai-Haahn Gāai
- Jyutping: Gaai3 haan6 gaai1
- IPA: [kāːi hàːn káːi]

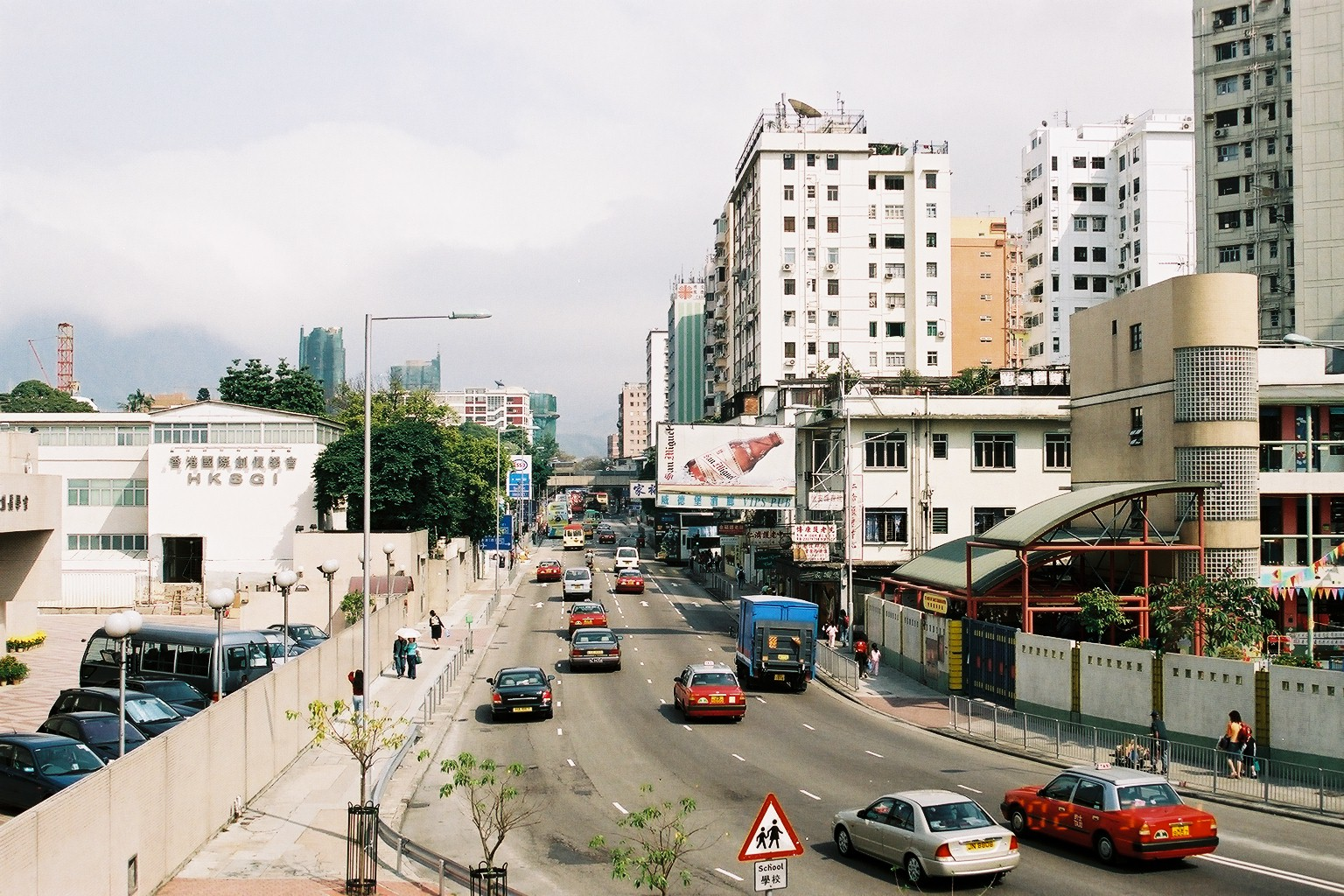
Boundary Street near Kowloon Tong

Boundary Street (Chinese: 界限街; Jyutping: gaai3 haan6 gaai1) is a three-lane one-way street in Kowloon, Hong Kong. It runs in an easterly direction from its start at the intersection with Tung Chau Street in the west, and ends at its intersection with Prince Edward Road West in the east, near the former Kai Tak Airport.

== History ==
The street previously marked the boundary between the southern part of Kowloon, ceded by the Qing dynasty to the United Kingdom in 1860 along with Stonecutters Island, and the northern part of Kowloon (New Kowloon) (which remained part of China until it was leased as part of the New Territories to the United Kingdom in 1898 for 99 years under the Second Convention of Peking). After the lease, the boundary was renamed from Boundary Line to Old Frontier Line.

The boundary was marked by a long line of tall bamboo fences, which effectively blocked smuggling between Chinese Kowloon and British Kowloon at that time. The barrier became obsolete when the New Territories joined the colony.

Although the street marks the historical boundary, the road did not come to exist until 1934, more than 30 years after the lease of boundary north. The road was built to accelerate the development of Kowloon Tong and identify the difference in calculation of rates between the boundary north and south.

== Present ==
In everyday life, New Kowloon is no longer regarded as part of the New Territories, but as part of the Kowloon urban area (on both sides of Boundary Street), except for statutory and land rent proposes, where the original arrangement has remained in place.

Administratively its portion west of the East Rail line forms part of the boundary between Yau Tsim Mong and Sham Shui Po districts, until the former western coast of the peninsula, from whereupon the boundary follows the streets on the reclamation.

On 1 July 1997, sovereignty of the territories on both sides of Boundary Street was handed over from the United Kingdom to the People's Republic of China, along with the rest of Hong Kong.

== Notable places along the street ==
- Fa Hui Park
- La Salle Primary School
- Maryknoll Convent School
- Sycamore Street Playground

== See also ==
- Convention for the Extension of Hong Kong Territory
- Convention of Peking (Beijing)
- History of Hong Kong
- Kowloon
- List of streets and roads in Hong Kong
- New Territories
