= Areas of Hong Kong =

First-level administrative divisions of Hong Kong

Hong Kong is administratively divided into three areas: Hong Kong Island, Kowloon, and the New Territories.

== Description ==
In order of precedence, Hong Kong is divided into three administrative levels: Areas (區域), Districts (地區), and Sub-districts (分區).

The area of Hong Kong Island administrates four districts: the districts of Central and Western, Eastern, Southern, and Wan Chai.

The area of Kowloon administrates five districts: the districts of Kowloon City, Kwun Tong, Sham Shui Po, Wong Tai Sin, and Yau Tsim Mong.

The area of the New Territories administrates nine districts: the districts of Islands, Kwai Tsing, North, Sai Kung, Sha Tin, Tai Po, Tsuen Wan, Tuen Mun, and Yuen Long.
