= New Territories =

Area of Hong Kong

New Territories 新界
- New Territories (in green) within Hong Kong
- Interactive map of New Territories
- Coordinates: 22.410°N 114.125°E
- Country: China
- Region: Hong Kong

Area
  - Total: 952 km^{2} (368 sq mi)

Population (2021)
  - Total: 3,984,077
  - Density: 4,180/km^{2} (10,800/sq mi)
- Time zone: UTC+08:00 (Hong Kong Time)

New Territories
- Chinese: 新界
- Jyutping: San1gaai3
- Literal meaning: New Frontier
Transcriptions
Standard Mandarin
- Hanyu Pinyin: Xīnjiè
- Bopomofo: ㄒㄧㄣ ㄐㄧㄝˋ
- Wade–Giles: Hsin^{1}-chieh^{4}
- Yale Romanization: Syīn jyèh
- IPA: [ɕíntɕjê]
Hakka
- Romanization: Sin^{1} Gai^{4}
Yue: Cantonese
- Yale Romanization: Sān'gaai
- Jyutping: San1gaai3
- IPA: [sɐn˥.kaj˧]
Southern Min
- Hokkien POJ: Sin-kài

The New Territories is the largest of the three areas of Hong Kong, alongside Hong Kong Island and Kowloon. It makes up 86.2% of Hong Kong's territory at an area of 952 square kilometres (368 sq mi), and contains 53.7% of the city's population at 3,984,077 as of 2021.

Historically, the New Territories is the region leased from Qing China to the United Kingdom in 1898 for 99 years, following the cession of Hong Kong Island and Kowloon in earlier years. Upon the expiry of the lease, the three areas were handed over to the People's Republic of China in 1997.

The boundaries of the New Territories has changed with time. First defined by the Second Convention of Peking, it originally consisted of the mainland area north of Boundary Street on the Kowloon Peninsula and south of the Sham Chun River (now the border between Hong Kong and mainland China), along with over 200 outlying islands, including Lantau Island, Lamma Island, Cheung Chau, and Peng Chau. Later extension of the Kowloon urban areas saw the region between Boundary Street and the Kowloon Ranges, spanning from Lai Chi Kok to Lei Yue Mun, gradually absorbed into Kowloon as New Kowloon. Nevertheless, New Kowloon remains statutorily part of the New Territories.

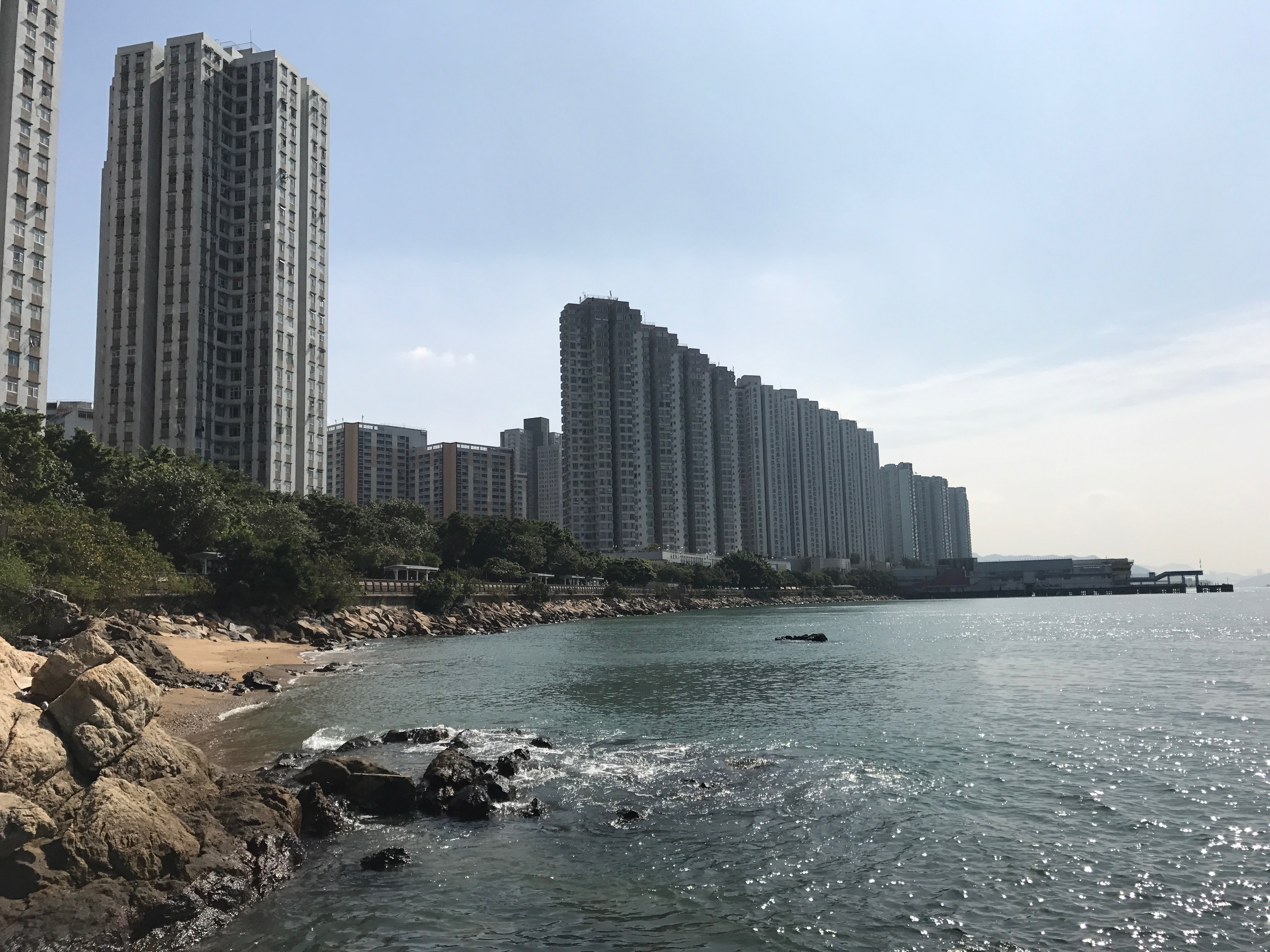
Butterfly Bay in New Territories

Flag of the New Territories Regional Council, which was disbanded on the last day of 1999

== History ==
=== Lease of New Territories ===
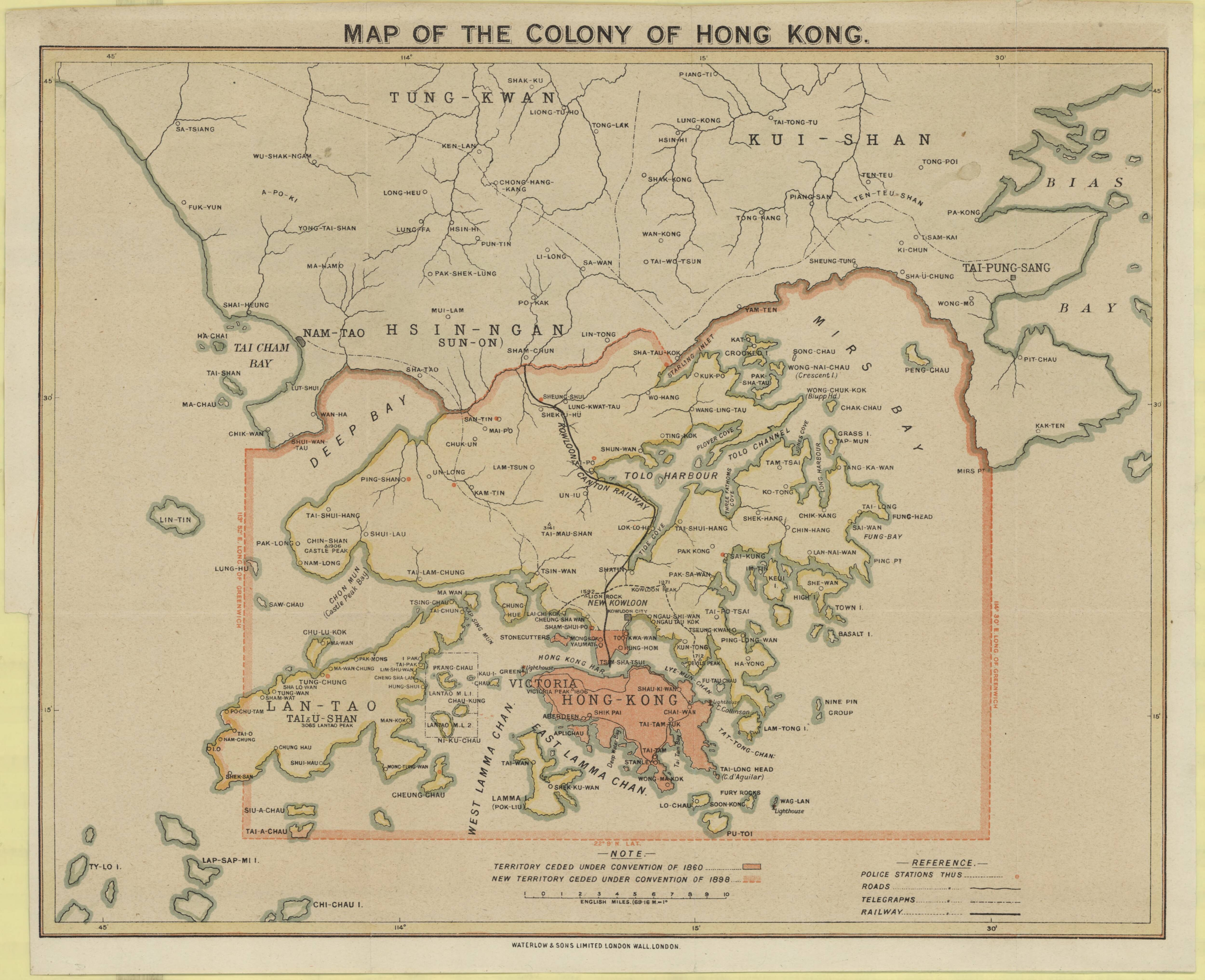
1900 map of Hong Kong and Kowloon with the New Territories acquired by the British in 1898

Hong Kong Island was ceded to Britain in 1842 by the Treaty of Nanjing ending the First Opium War, and Kowloon south of Boundary Street and Stonecutters Island were ceded in 1860 by a lease subsequently incorporated into the Convention of Beijing ending the Second Opium War. The colony of Hong Kong attracted a large number of Chinese and Westerners to seek their fortune in the city. Its population increased rapidly and the city became overcrowded. The outbreak of bubonic plague in 1894 became a concern to the Hong Kong government. There was a need to expand the colony to accommodate its growing population. The Qing dynasty's defeat in the First Sino-Japanese War had shown that it was incapable of defending itself. Victoria City and Victoria Harbour were vulnerable to any hostile forces launching attacks from the hills of Kowloon.

Alarmed by the encroachment of other European powers in China, Britain also feared for the security of Hong Kong. In June 1898, using the most favoured nation clause that it had previously secured from China, the United Kingdom demanded and received an extension of Kowloon to counter the establishment of France's new Guangzhouwan colony, which was well reinforced by their control of nearby Indochina. In similar fashion, in July, it secured Weihaiwei in Shandong in the north as a base for operations against the Germans in Jiaozhou Bay (Qingdao) and the Russians in Liaodong (Dalian). Chinese officials stayed in the walled cities of Kowloon City and Weihaiwei.

The extension of Kowloon was called the New Territories. The additional land was estimated to be 365 square miles (950 km^{2}) or 12 times the size of the existing colonial Hong Kong at the time.

=== British assumption of sovereignty ===
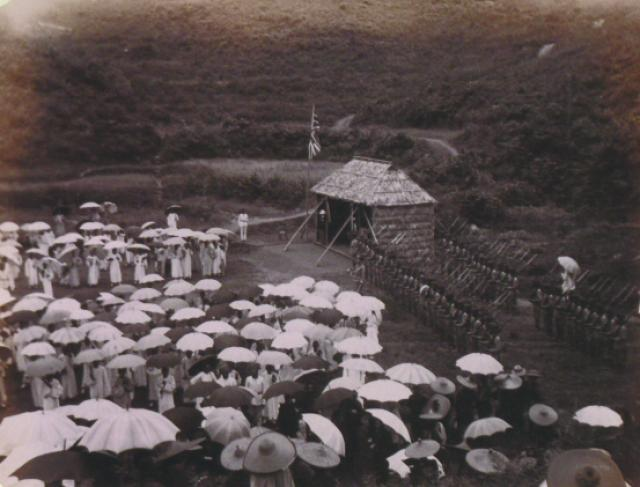
The British ceremony in Tai Po, 1899, assuming control of the New Territories

Although the convention was signed on the 9 June 1898 and became effective on 1 July, the British did not take over the New Territories immediately. During this period, there was no Hong Kong governor and Wilsone Black acted as administrator. James Stewart Lockhart, the colonial secretary of Hong Kong, was sent back from England to make a survey of New Territories before formal transfer. The survey found that the new frontier at Sham Chun River (Shenzhen river) suggested by Wilsone Black was far from ideal. It excluded the town of Shenzhen (Sham Chun), and the boundary would divide the town. There was no mountain range as a natural border. Lockhart suggested moving the frontier to the line of hills north of Shenzhen. This suggestion was not received favourably and the Chinese official suggested the frontier be moved to the hill much further south of the Sham Chun River. It was settled in March 1899 that the boundary remain at the Sham Chun River.

The new Hong Kong governor, Henry Blake, arrived in November 1898. The date for the takeover of the New Territories was fixed as 17 April 1899, and Tai Po was chosen as the administrative centre. The transfer was not smooth and peaceful. In early April 1899, the captain superintendent of police, Francis Henry May, and some policemen erected a flagstaff and temporary headquarters at Tai Po and posted the governor's proclamation of the takeover date. Fearing for their traditional land rights, in the Six-Day War of 1899, a number of clans attempted to resist the British, mobilising clan militias that had been organised and armed to protect against longshore raids by pirates. The militia men attempted a frontal attack against the temporary police station in Tai Po that was the main British base but were beaten back by superior force of arms. An attempt by the clansmen at guerilla warfare was put down by the British near Lam Tsuen with over 500 Chinese men killed, and collapsed when British artillery was brought to bear on the walled villages of the clansmen. Most prominent of the villages in the resistance Kat Hing Wai, of the Tang clan, was symbolically disarmed, by having its main gates dismounted and removed. However, in order to prevent future resistance the British made concessions to the indigenous inhabitants with regard to land use, land inheritance and marriage laws; the majority of which remained in place into the 1960s when polygamy was outlawed. Some of the concessions with regard to land use and inheritance remain in place in Hong Kong to this day and is a source of friction between indigenous inhabitants and other Hong Kong residents.

Lord Lugard was governor from 1907 to 1912, and he proposed the return of Weihaiwei to the Chinese government, in return for the ceding of the leased New Territories in perpetuity. The proposal was not received favourably, although if it had been acted on, Hong Kong might have remained forever in British hands.

=== New town development ===
Much of the New Territories was, and to a limited extent still is, made up of rural areas. Attempts at modernising the area did not become fully committed until the late 1970s, when many new towns were built to accommodate the population growth from urbanised areas of Kowloon and Hong Kong Island. Despite rapid development of the new towns, which now accommodate a population of over 3 million, the Hong Kong government confines built-up areas to a few areas and reserves large parts of the region as parkland.

=== Sovereignty transfer to the PRC ===
As the expiry date of the lease neared in the 1980s, talks between the United Kingdom and the People's Republic of China led to the signing of the Sino-British Joint Declaration (1984), in which the whole of Hong Kong would be returned, instead of only the New Territories.

== Districts ==
The New Territories comprises nine districts, each with their own district council:

- New Territories East
  - North District
  - Sai Kung District
  - Sha Tin District
  - Tai Po District
- New Territories West
  - Islands District
  - Kwai Tsing District (Kwai Chung and Tsing Yi Island)
  - Tsuen Wan District
  - Tuen Mun District
  - Yuen Long District

== Population ==
According to the 2021 census, the population of the New Territories was 3,984,077, representing 53.7% of Hong Kong's total population. A total of 90.4% of the residents of New Territories use Cantonese as their main language. Meanwhile, 3.5% of its residents use English, 2.0% use Mandarin Chinese, and 2.3% use other Chinese dialects. A total of 93.1% the district's population is of Chinese descent. The largest ethnic minority groups are Filipinos (2.1%), Indonesians (1.8%), South Asians (1.1%), Mixed (0.8%) and Whites (0.7%).

== New Kowloon ==
New Kowloon covers the entirety of the Wong Tai Sin and Kwun Tong districts, as well as the mainland portion of the Sham Shui Po District (i.e. excluding the Stonecutters Island) and the northern portion of the Kowloon City District (portion to the north of Boundary Street/Prince Edward Road West, as well as reclaimed land including the Kai Tak Airport).

== See also ==
- Boundary Street
- Country parks and conservation in Hong Kong
- Kowloon Peninsula
- List of areas of Hong Kong
- New Kowloon
