= Tai Po Lookout =

Historical building in Hong Kong

Coordinates: 22.4357°N 114.1937°E

- 大埔瞭望台
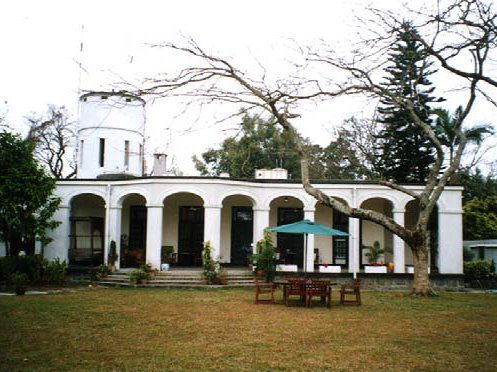
- Tai Po Lookout

General information
- Location: Tai Po Kau, Tai Po District, New Territories, 11 Lookout Link, Hong Kong
- Completed: early 1900s
- Owner: Hong Kong Government
- Landlord: Government Property Agency

Design and construction
- Architect: Lawrence Gibbs
- Designations

Hong Kong Graded Building – Grade I
- Reference no.: 18 December 2009; 16 years ago

Tai Po Lookout
- Traditional Chinese: 大埔瞭望檯
Transcriptions
Yue: Cantonese
- Yale Romanization: Daaih bou lìuh mohng tói
- Jyutping: Daai6 bou3 liu4 mong6 toi2

Tai Po Lookout is a historical residential building situated at No. 11, Lookout Link, Tai Po Kau, Tai Po District, in the New Territories of Hong Kong.

Tai Po Lookout was built in the early twentieth century by Lawrence Gibbs, a British engineer, as his residence. The Lookout had many different owners throughout the years, and was circulated around very frequently. During the Japanese occupation of Hong Kong, the Lookout was used as a torture chamber by the Japanese. After World War II, the land became government property. It was used by government officials such as the Tai Po District Officers and the Head of Police Secret Service as their private residences. This included Trevor Bedford OBE, who was District Officer of the New Territories at the time, and would later become director of Hong Kong Land in the 1970s to 1983. In 1996, the government leased the Lookout to the Society for AIDS Care (SAC). The SAC launched the Lookout Project to provide hospice care for AIDS patients. The service was first operated in June 1997 and officially closed on the first of June 2000 due to drying up of funds. Since then, the Lookout has been leased by the Government Property Agency to private owners and reverted to its original residential purpose.

The Lookout is a colonial-style building with a watch tower. Standing on top of a small hill, it overlooks Tai Po District and Tolo Harbour. In 1985, the building was accorded as a Grade II Historic Building by the Antiquities Advisory Board (古物諮詢委員). Recently, it is proposed that the status of the Lookout to be regarded as Grade I..

== History ==
Tai Po Lookout is situated on former Tai Po Inland Lot No. 5 (now at No. 11 Lookout Link, Tai Po Kau, Tai Po, New Territories, Hong Kong). In 1904, Lawrence Gibbs bought the piece of land and built the Lookout as his residence. He was a British civil engineer who worked at the Public Works Department then also 'Denison, Ram & Gibbs' in 1900.

The Lookout was designed and built by Gibbs in the early 1900s and he used it as his own residence. The Lookout's location was a remote area in Tai Po on top of a small hill and it is believed that the beautiful views there is the reason for choosing that particular place to build the Lookout. It remains to be a difficult place to get to even in present time. As an engineer, Gibbs was able to get water supply from the hillside, the tower found in the Lookout was also used as a water tower.

Throughout the years, the Lookout was sold to different owners. In 1929, the Lookout was sold to Herbert Austin Rogers. After 4 years, August 1933, it was sold to Michael Howard Turner as the leaseholder of the house. Immediately after, the November of the same year, the Lookout was sold to John Alexander Fraser, a judge in Hong Kong as his living quarter. During the time of World War II, Fraser was kept in the Stanley Internment Camp during the Japanese occupation of Hong Kong where he died. The Lookout was then occupied by the Japanese and was used as a torture chamber. Skeletons have been reported found buried beneath the lawn.

After the war, in December 1947, the land became government property. Since then it served as the living quarters of government officials. Many officers of the Tai Po District and the head of the Police Secret Service lived in the Lookout. In 1996, it was leased to the Society of AIDs Care as a residential centre for AIDS patients. Until the year 2000, the Lookout returned to being a private residence.

== The Lookout Project ==
Dedicated to promote the wellbeing of people living with HIV/AIDS and their care givers, Sister Maureen McGinley MBE established the Society for AIDS Care (愛滋寧養服務協會) in 1994 with the support from the government. The SAC is community-based non-profit charity organization aiming at running sustainable HIV/AIDS programmes on care and prevention. The SAC is a professional team of nurses, counselors, social workers and physiotherapists who provide both centered-based and external services for AIDS patients and their families.

In 1996, the Tai Po Lookout was leased to the SAC. The organization planned to implement the Lookout Project as a measure to tackle with the lack of hospice facilities when AIDS treatment was not mature. The Project officially started in May 1997. It admitted and served 73 patients until it stopped operating on 1 June 2000. The project received funding from the Council for the AIDS Trust Fund (愛滋病信託基金委員會) in Hong Kong, which provided $30 million to cover the running cost of the hospice. The implementation of the Lookout Project faced strong objection from the Department of Health (Hong Kong) from 1995 to 1996, shortly before the Lookout's opening though. Health officials argued that the Lookout was deemed to be short-living as "cocktail therapy", treatment by taking a combination of several antiretroviral drugs, was already available in Hong Kong and was expected to be used extensively. They also claimed that isolation of AIDS patients from the urban area would hinder the integration of patients into the community.

The Lookout, situated at a remote area in Tai Po, functioned as a 24-hour residential medical center that offered day-care as well as in-patient service, particularly for terminal patients. It was recognized as Asia's first and only 24-hour residential medical care centre at that time. The Lookout originally had five beds for in-patients and two more beds were added in 1999. Facilities were also set up for patients' families to stay overnight when they needed to. On top of these, the Lookout was a center for physiotherapy and counselling to help patient maintain good physical and psychological health. An integration of services was provided by a team of specifically trained doctors, nurses and social workers in palliative care. It was closely associated with other Hong Kong SAR medical bodies such as the Department of Health AIDS Unit and Queen Elizabeth Hospital Special Medical Unit to provide more comprehensive care to patients. In addition, the Lookout provided educational and experimental training for medical personnel in AIDS care.

Most of the patients admitted when the Lookout first operated were kicked out by their families, who could not tolerate the notion of living under the same roof with relatives contracted with HIV. They had low chance of survival unless they had a high insurance premium or were able to afford treatment overseas. Two of the seventy-three patients died during their stay at the Lookout. The bungalow served as a quiet sanctuary for these patients. It was planned that 22 beds were to be made available within two years of operation. However, with the advancement of AIDS treatment, demand for hospice service for AIDS care declined drastically with the emergence of antiretroviral drugs, which profoundly lengthen the life span of AIDS patients. Taking a combination of several drugs, patients are expected to live as long as they remain on medication. The plan for expansion was eventually abandoned as dedicated hospice facilities were no longer widely needed as before. Access to medical care in public hospitals was much easier. Thereon, the Lookout put its focus on nursing care and counselling instead of medical services. It served as a "mid-way home" for patients to rebuild self-esteem and helped them integrate into the community by providing space and time for them to organize themselves.

Funding for the Lookout ceased in the third year of the Project on the grounds that the Project performed overlapping functions as other hospice services provided by public hospitals. The SAC could not find sufficient financial support for keeping the running of the Lookout. Moreover, resorting to life in a remote part of the New Territories was unnecessary as AIDS patients under cocktail therapy were able to lead a more or less normal life at home. Falling short of demand, together with the drying up of funds, prompted the SAC's decision to put an end to the Project in February, 2000. The last two patients at the Lookout was transferred to other medical centers and marked the official closure of the Lookout at the end of May, 2000. Although the Lookout Project did not last long, it was a pioneering experiment to introduce hospice service into the existing medical system. It brought insights to other health projects as in the importance of considering medical development and patients needs.

== Architectural and geographic features ==
The Lookout adapts the colonial style and is a one-storey flat-roofed building with an arched colonnaded verandah, a projecting portico (built at a later date) and a cylindrical watch tower at the top which gives the building its name. The watch tower is also a water tower. The walls stands on a low rubble plinth and are painted white, this remains to be unchanged till present time. There are several quarters for servants in a detached block set at a particular angle next to the main building of the Lookout located on another small hill. The Lookout also has a lawn that has views over Tolo Harbour to the Pat Sin Leng.

The design of the house internally is quite symmetrical and had some walls and partitions removed over the years by comparing the current building with the original floor plan. The Lookout still contains its original design and appearance from a few infill windows to the rear verandah It also as a swimming pool, in the past, the water supplies from a nearby stream not only supplied water for the residence all year round, but also enough water for the swimming pool.

When the Lookout was first built it had no water mains and relied on a stream nearby which went strongly all year round. The stream supplied water to the house and the overflow went into the swimming pool of the garden. Water mains was later developed and supply fresh water to Lookout Link.

It is known that the Lookout is able to view Island House (the former residence of government official, now property of the World Wide Fund for Nature) located next to the shore, a declared monument of Hong Kong. It now continues to oversee the Tai Po District and Tolo Harbour.

The Lookout is situated in a remote area on top of a small hill and close to the Lookout are mansions such as Villa Costa and 'Tsung Tsai Yuen' (松仔園), a part of Tai Po Kau Natural Reserve. This particular area is famous for being the home of fireflies all year round. The area is also well known for the 'Ghostly Bridge' (猛鬼橋), which is located at part of Tai Po Road – Tai Po Kau section. The name came from an incident during the 1950s where many students were washed away in a storm under a bridge.

== Conservation ==
Under the management of Government Property Agency (政府產業署), Tai Po Lookout is a structure not open to public. It is being leased since 2000. Thus, the question of adaptive reuse is not a current concern as the Lookout serves as private residence once again. Because the Lookout is located in a remote part of Tai Po, it is not a popular landmark and is just of a local interest. As a colonial architectural building located in such a remote area in Tai Po, it is a rare and unique piece of heritage that still remains.

In 1985, the Antiquities Advisory Board accorded the Lookout as Grade II Historic Building, meaning that the Lookout had "special merit and efforts should be made to selectively preserve". Recently, it is proposed in the assessment on the 1,444 historic building completed in March 2009 that the status to be raised to Grade I Historic Building to ascertain its outstanding merit.

In vicinity to Tai Po Lookout in the same district, there is a range of Grade II Historic Buildings managed by different institutions at present time, including, the Old Tai Po Police Station, Old District Office North, Old Police Bungalow, and the Island House. These buildings share the same colonial style as the Lookout since they were built at roughly the same period of time.

== Transportation ==
Tai Po Lookout stands on the top of a small hill in Tai Po Kau and has always been a difficult place to reach amongst the area as it is still remotely far away from the central concentrated area of Tai Po. The only means of transportation would be bus 72, 72A of Kowloon Motor Bus and taxi. Minibus 28K would also lead to the area of Tai Po Kau. Five to ten minutes of walking is necessary after taking the bus or minibus as there are no direct transport leading to the Lookout.
