= Tai Po Tau =

Village in Tai Po District, Hong Kong

Tai Po Tau 大埔頭
- Village
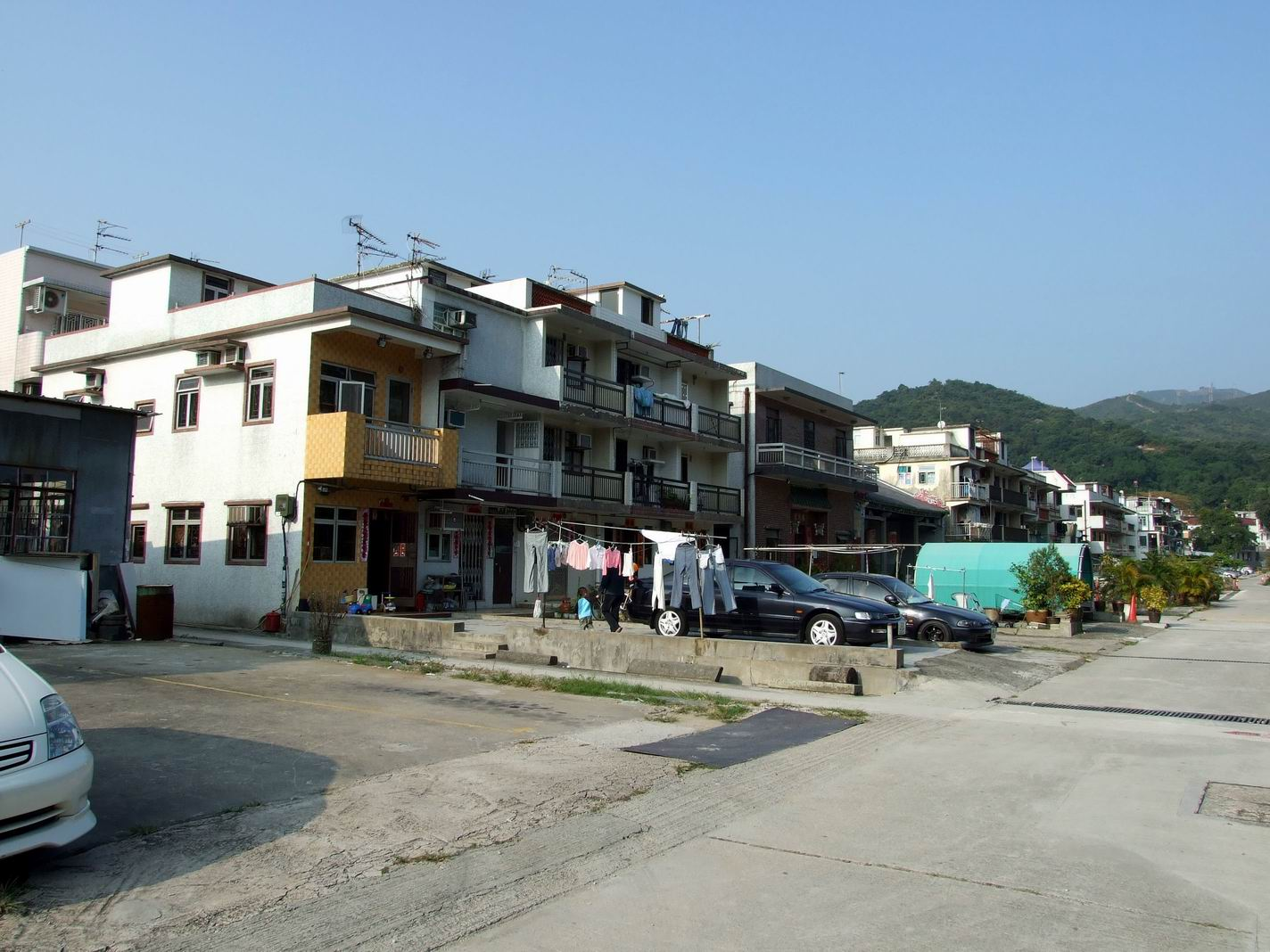
- Tai Po Tau Tsuen

- Location within Hong Kong
- Coordinates: 22.4552°N 114.1576°E
- Country: China
- SAR: Hong Kong
- District: Tai Po District

Population (1911 census)
  - Total: 112

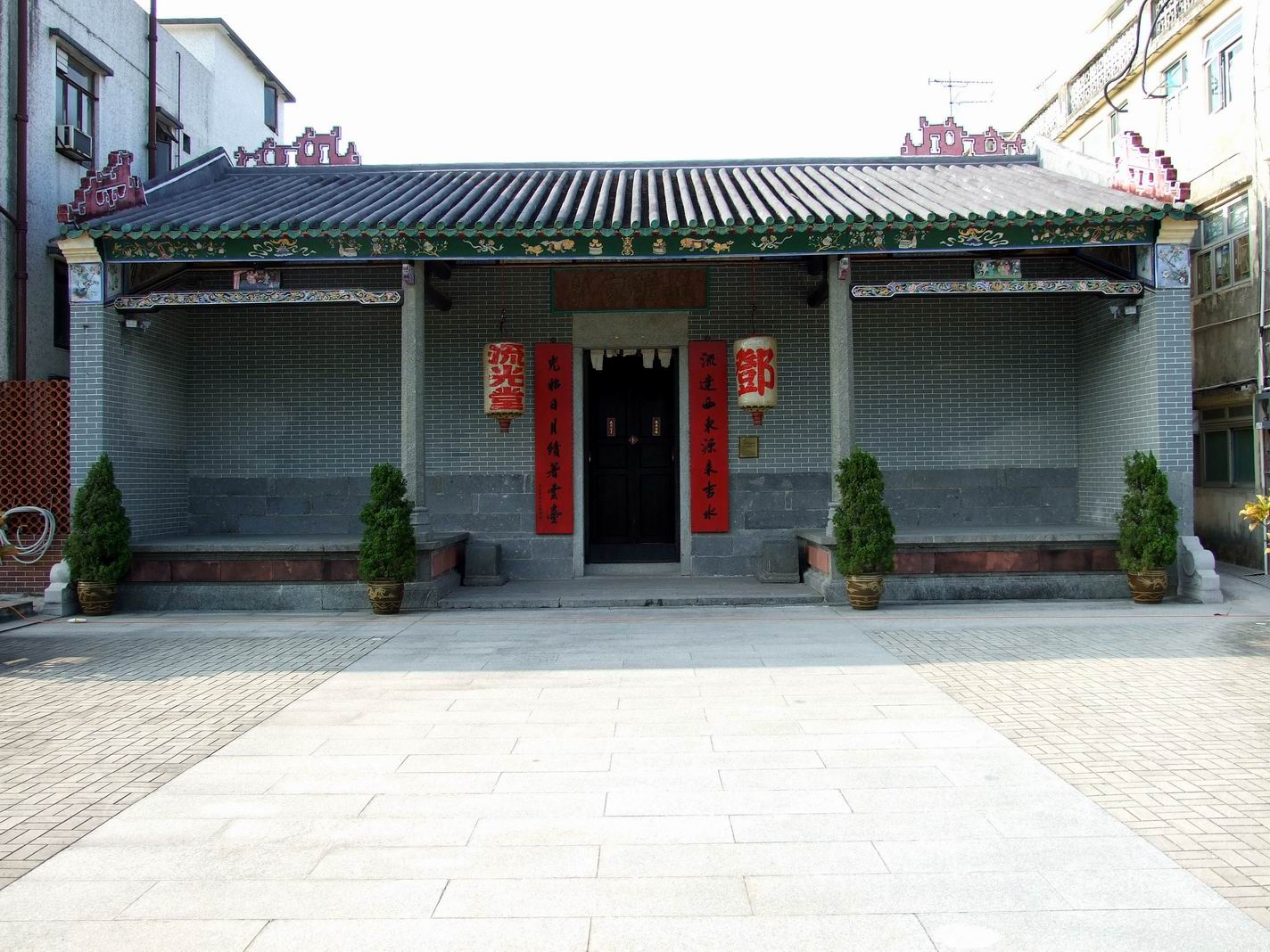
King Law Ka Shuk in Tai Po Tau Tsuen.

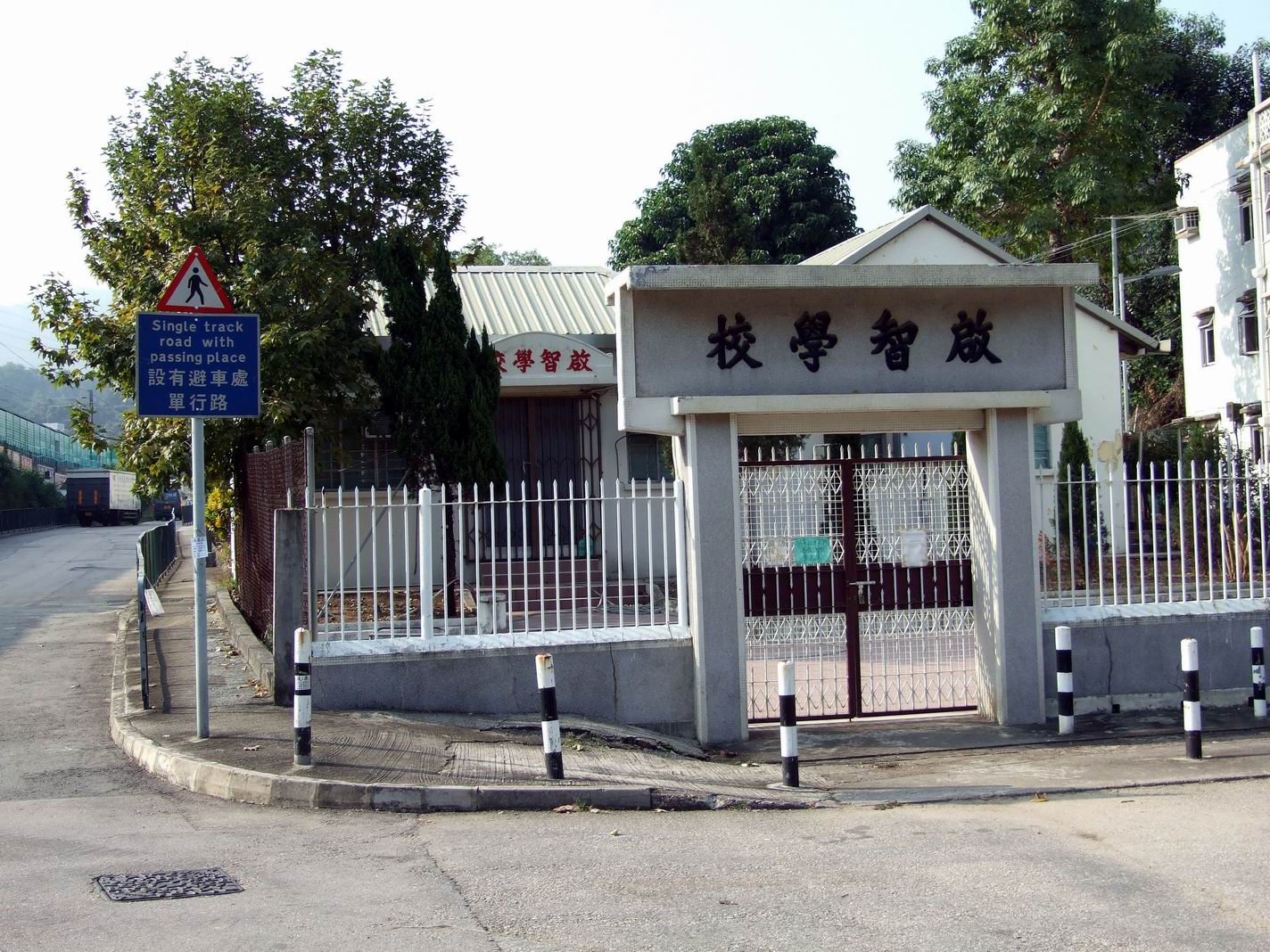
Kai Chi School in Tai Po Tau Tsuen

Tai Po Tau (Chinese: 大埔頭; historically 大步頭) is an area in Tai Po District, Hong Kong. It was named after a village of the same name. However, the village is now known as Tai Po Tau Tsuen (Tai Po Tau village; Chinese: 大埔頭村). The village itself is named after Tai Po.

In the past, Tai Po Tau Tsuen and Tai Po Tau Shui Wai (also known as just 'Shui Wai') was one village. However, the village was divided by the Kowloon–Canton Railway British section (now known as East Rail line) in the 1910s.

== Administration ==
Tai Po Tau is a recognized village under the New Territories Small House Policy. It is one of the villages represented within the Tai Po Rural Committee. For electoral purposes, Tai Po Tau is part of the Old Market & Serenity constituency, which is currently represented by Lau Yung-wai.

== History ==
Tai Po Tau Tsuen was founded by the Tang clan of Lung Yeuk Tau. Tangs of Tai Po Tau and Lung Yeuk Tau co-founded Tai Po Hui which firstly located in modern-day area Tai Po Old Market, near Tai Po Tau.

When the ban on human settlement of coastal areas of the Great Clearance was lifted in 1668, the coastal defense was reinforced. Twenty-one fortified mounds, each manned with an army unit, were created along the border of Xin'an County, and at least five of them were located in present-day Hong Kong. 1) The Tuen Mun Mound, believed to have been built on Castle Peak or Kau Keng Shan, was manned by 50 soldiers. 2) The Kowloon Mound on Lion Rock and 3) the Tai Po Tau Mound northwest of Tai Po Old Market had each 30 soldiers. 4) The Ma Tseuk Leng Mound stood between present-day Sha Tau Kok and Fan Ling and was manned by 50 men. 5) The fifth one at Fat Tong Mun, probably on today's Tin Ha Shan Peninsula, was an observation post manned by 10 soldiers. In 1682, these forces were re-organized and manned by detachments from the Green Standard Army with reduced strength.

At the time of the 1911 census, the population of Tai Po Tau was 112. The number of males was 50.

== See also ==
- King Law Ka Shuk
- Tai Po Market
