= Flagstaff Hill, Tai Po =

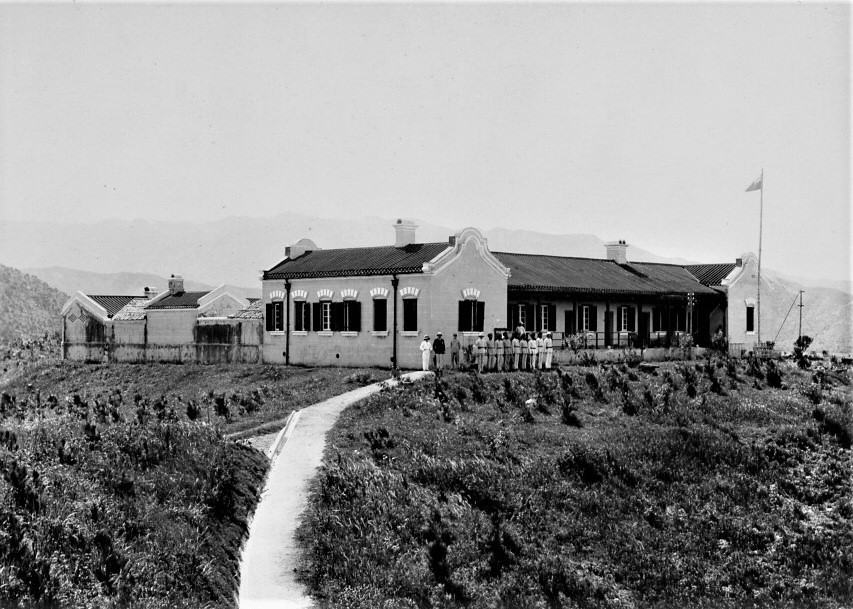
Tai Po Police Station in 1901.

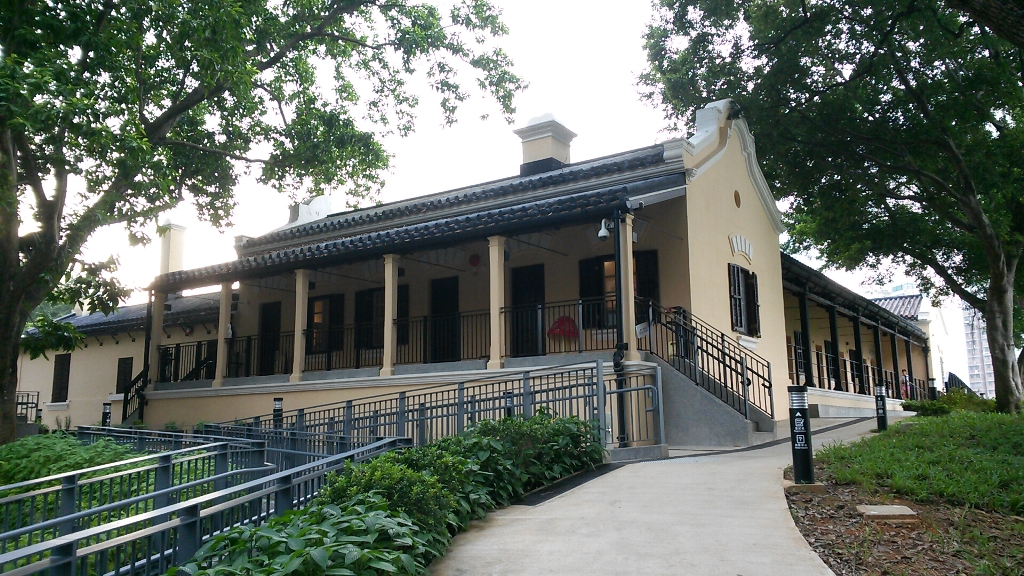
Old Tai Po Police Station in 2015.

Flagstaff Hill is a hill in Tai Po, Hong Kong. It was the site of the British flag raising ceremony which marked the official British takeover of the New Territories. on 16 April 1899, after the British leased the New Territories in 1898. The Old Tai Po Police Station was built in 1899 at the site. It was the first police station and police headquarters in the New Territories. It operated as a police station until the new district police station of Tai Po started its service in 1987.

== See also ==
- Six-Day War (1899)
- Possession Street
