= Sheung Wong Yi Au =

Village in Hong Kong

Coordinates: 22.43907°N 114.173965°E

Sheung Wong Yi Au (Chinese: 上黃宜坳) is a village in Tai Po Kau, Tai Po District, Hong Kong.

== Administration ==
Sheung Wong Yi Au is a recognized village under the New Territories Small House Policy.

== History ==
At the time of the 1911 census, the population of Wong Yi Au was 114. The number of males was 43.

== See also ==
- Ha Wong Yi Au
