= King Law Ka Shuk =

Coordinates: 22.454591°N 114.157111°E

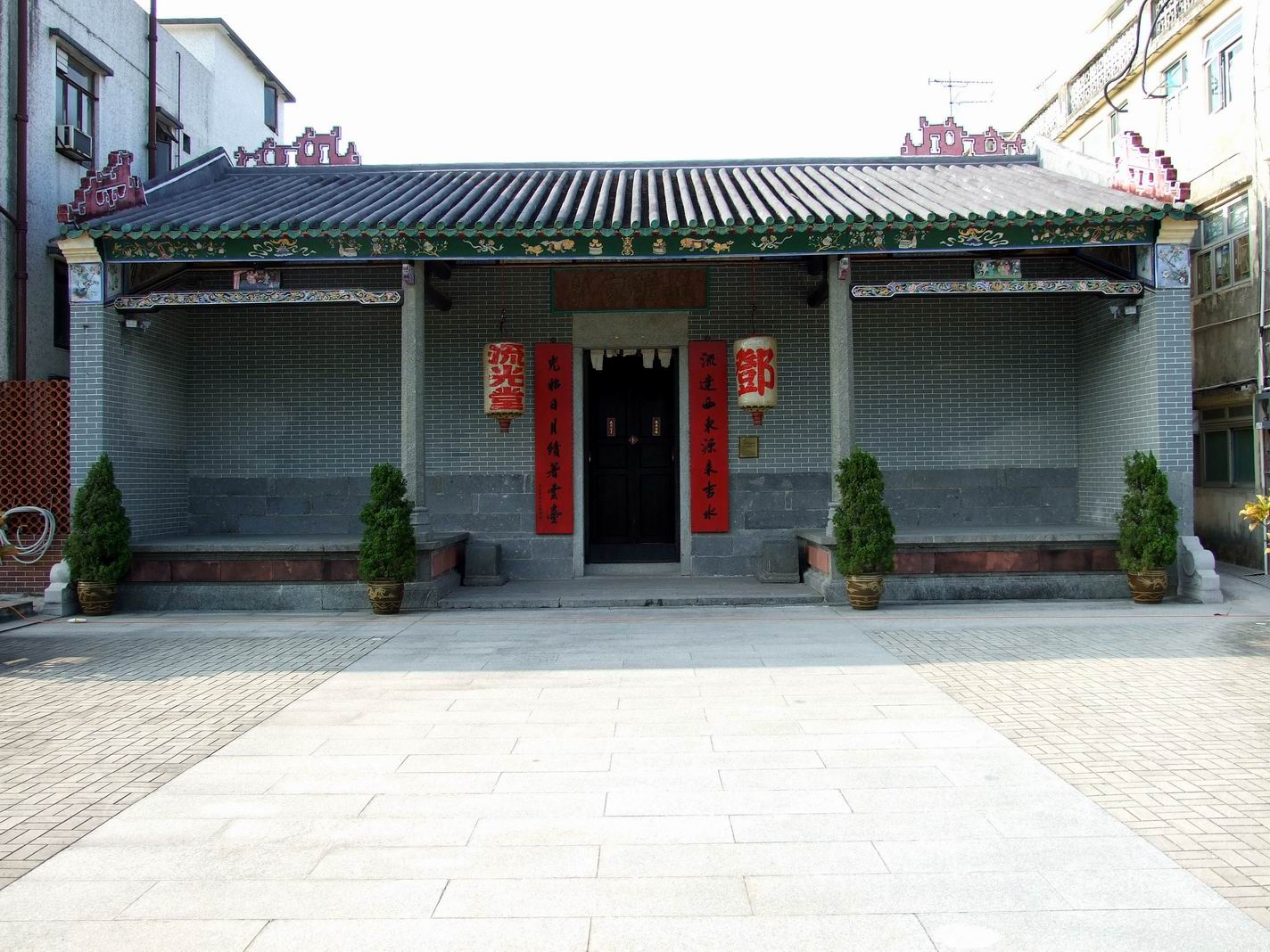
- King Law Ka Shuk
- Traditional Chinese: 敬羅家塾
Transcriptions
Yue: Cantonese
- Yale Romanization: Ging lòh gāa suhk
- Jyutping: Ging3 lo4 gaa1 suk6

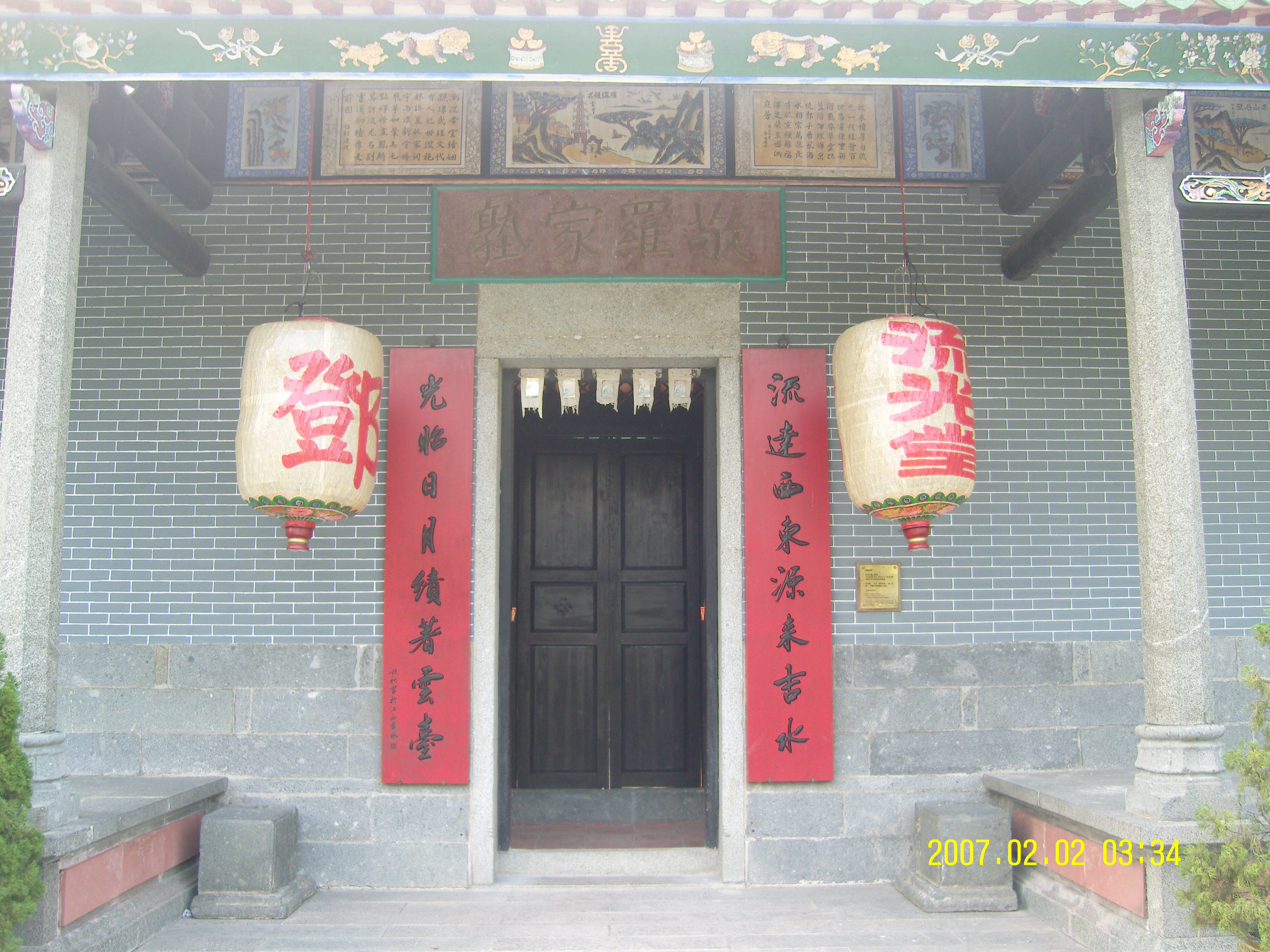
King Law Ka Shuk

King Law Ka Shuk is a Hong Kong historical building situated in Tai Po Tau Tsuen, north of Tai Po in the New Territories. In the past, it was used as an ancestral hall to hold meetings and traditional functions in the village and it is now in full use as a local meeting place. The building was named after Tang King Law, who was one of the ancestors of Tang's Family (or Tang Clan). It occupies a total area of 349.69 square metres (3,764.0 sq ft). It was declared as a monument, under the full legal protection of the Hong Kong SAR Government, on 21 July 1998.

The temple was constructed in the early 18th century. Apart from being an ancestral hall for people to show respect to their ancestors and hold clan meetings, it was also a study hall for the Tang clans, who were taught with a Chinese traditional teaching method known as Bok Bok Chai. There were a maximum of 40 students at one time and the building was once the premises of Kai Chi School, which was subsequently relocated in 1953. However, as the Hong Kong Government later implemented an education programme in 1948, the building lost its function of being a study hall. It then solely served as a venue for traditional festive functions and village meetings.

== Nomenclature ==
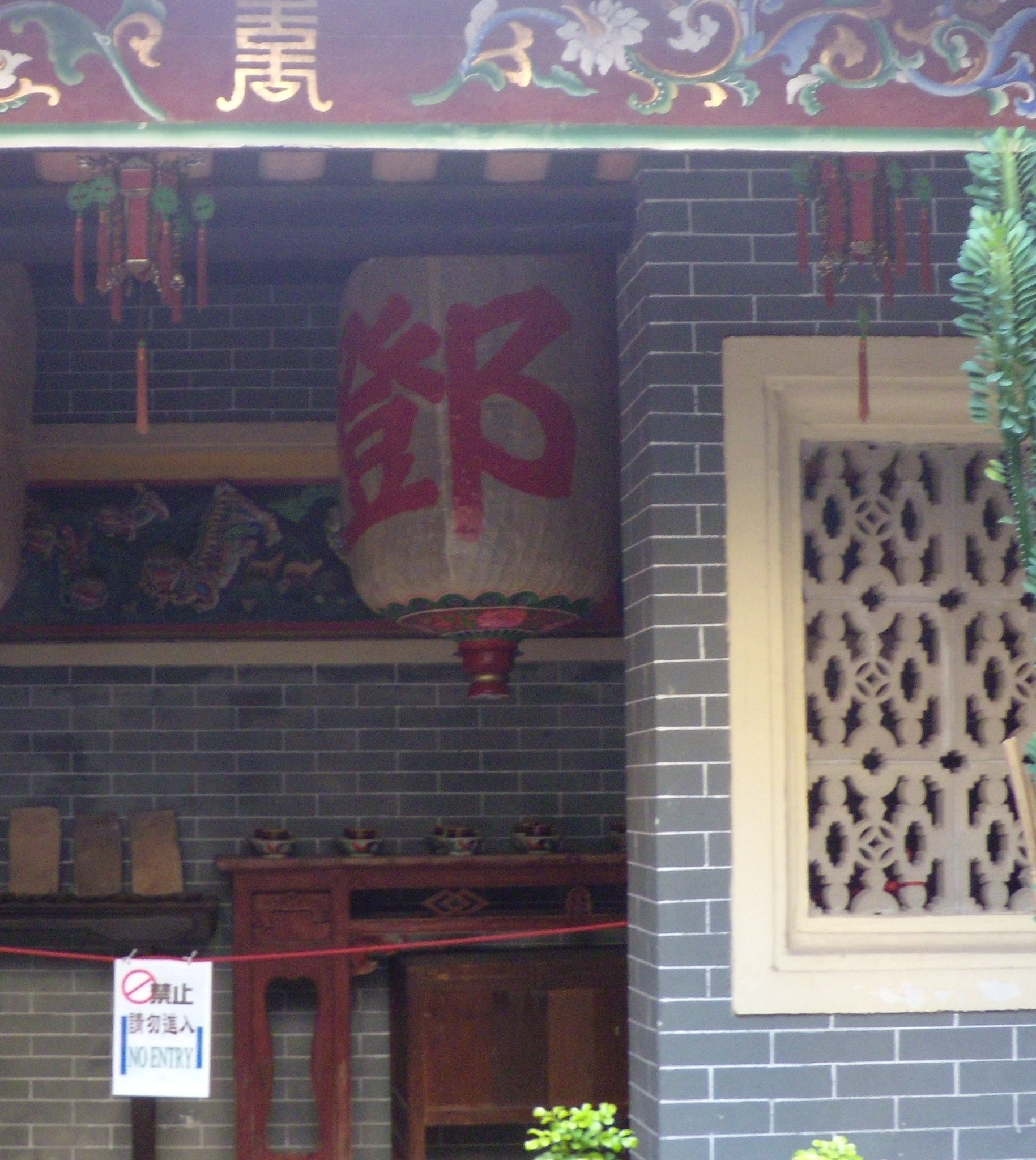
A lantern with the Chinese word 'Tang' on it inside the temple

King Law Ka Shuk was named after the 10th generation ancestor Tang King Law, who was respected as the first generation of Lau Kwong Tong of the Tang Clan in Tai Po Tau.

== History ==
The exact year of construction of the temple cannot be ascertained, but it is believed to have been constructed in the early 18th century. According to local villagers, the ancestral hall was built by Tang Yuen-wang, Tang Mui-kei and Tang Nim-fung of the 13th generation in the Ming dynasty (1368–1644).

Descendants of the local Tang clan originated from Jiangxi Province in mainland China and moved to settle in Kam Tin, and later branching out into Lung Yeuk Tau, Ha Tsuen, Tai Po and Ping Shan amongst other areas. A branch of the Tang Yuen-leung lineage settled in Tai Po Tau in the 13th century and founded the walled village, Shui Wai where batteries were erected at four corners of the village while houses were built in an orderly fashion. Due to the construction of the Kowloon-Canton Railway at the beginning of the 20th century, the village was separated into Shui Wai and Tai Po Tau. A three-story watchtower was built in Tai Po Tau for defensive purposes, however, it was demolished in the 1980s.

Apart from being a place for ancestral worship, it was used as a shuk (study hall) for preparing clan members for important imperial examinations. For some time, it was used as the premises of Kai Chi School which was subsequently relocated in 1953. Now, it is a venue for holding clan meetings and traditional festival functions.

== Design ==
There are three halls and two courtyards at King Law Ka Shuk, which is a traditional Chinese building with a functional design and elegant ornamental features. Geometric plaster mouldings can be found on the roof ridges and wall friezes while for the internal eave boards, patterns of leafy and motifs are used. To support the roof, there are two drum terraces, each having two granite columns, in the front of the study hall. An altar with six levels, which is intricately carved, can be found in the main chamber of the study hall. It was made in Guangzhou in 1932 to place the soul tablets of the ancestors from Yuen-leung to King-law.

There is a slab above the main entrance, which is moulded with the four Chinese characters denoting "King Law Ka Shuk". The characters were written by well-known calligraphist Tang Yi-nga, who was the son of one of the descendants of the Tang lineage of Dongguan, Tang Yung-Kang. Tang Yung-Kang is also noted for being the Hanlin Yuan Shue Kat Sz (Imperial examination scholar) in the tenth year of the reign of the Tongzhi Emperor (1871) during the Qing dynasty.

== Restoration ==
Restoration work commenced on 3 November 1998 and was completed in January 2001. This construction work was funded by the HKSAR Government, monitored by the Antiquities and Monuments Office of the Leisure and Culture Services Department and carried out by the Architectural Service Department. Other participants included professional conservators from Hong Kong, mainland China and the UK, as well as the villagers from Tai Po Tau Tsuen.

In September 1998, before initiating the restoration of the building, in order to ensure that King Law Ka Shuk was properly documented and to allow better understanding of the construction methods, design, materials used and the functions of the building, the Antiquities and Monuments Office commissioned the Guangdong Provincial Institute of Cultural Relics and Archaeology to conduct a detailed cartographic survey and record about the history of the building, also to produce a conservation plan about the restoration. The experts took one month's time to complete the on-site cartographic survey. After that, they produced a full set of measured drawings and plans for the restoration of the building, which include a site plan, floor plans, elevations, sections, roof plans and details like the altar, doors and windows of the study hall.

The major objectives of the restoration were not only to fully repair the building, but also to restore it into an architectural style of the Qing Dynasty to the greatest extent, in which dynasty it was firstly built. Some improvement works like re-laying the front courtyard as well as the provision of lighting and power supply for some night time functions or celebrations were also conducted. In order to successfully restore the building into its original appearance, modern materials like cement and steel were removed. However, for reminiscence, two original parapets and the ancestral altar were preserved. Additionally, the murals on the facade, the altar, the woodcarvings and name boards, for example, were all restored by a group of specialist conservators. In addition, the altar, which was specially ordered from Guangzhou by the Tang clan during the restoration in 1932, is the most dedicate relic in the ancestral hall. Dr. John Hurd from the United Kingdom was commissioned by the Antiquities and Monuments Office to help restore the altar and other relics. The altar was re-gilded and brought back to its original splendour. Other relics were also carefully restored by him and his team.

Among the rituals of restoration of traditional Chinese buildings, the raising of the ridge purlin, the main roof support beam, is the most significant. During the restoration, the ridge purlin raising ceremony took place on 3 June 1999 and was attended by all senior members of the clan.

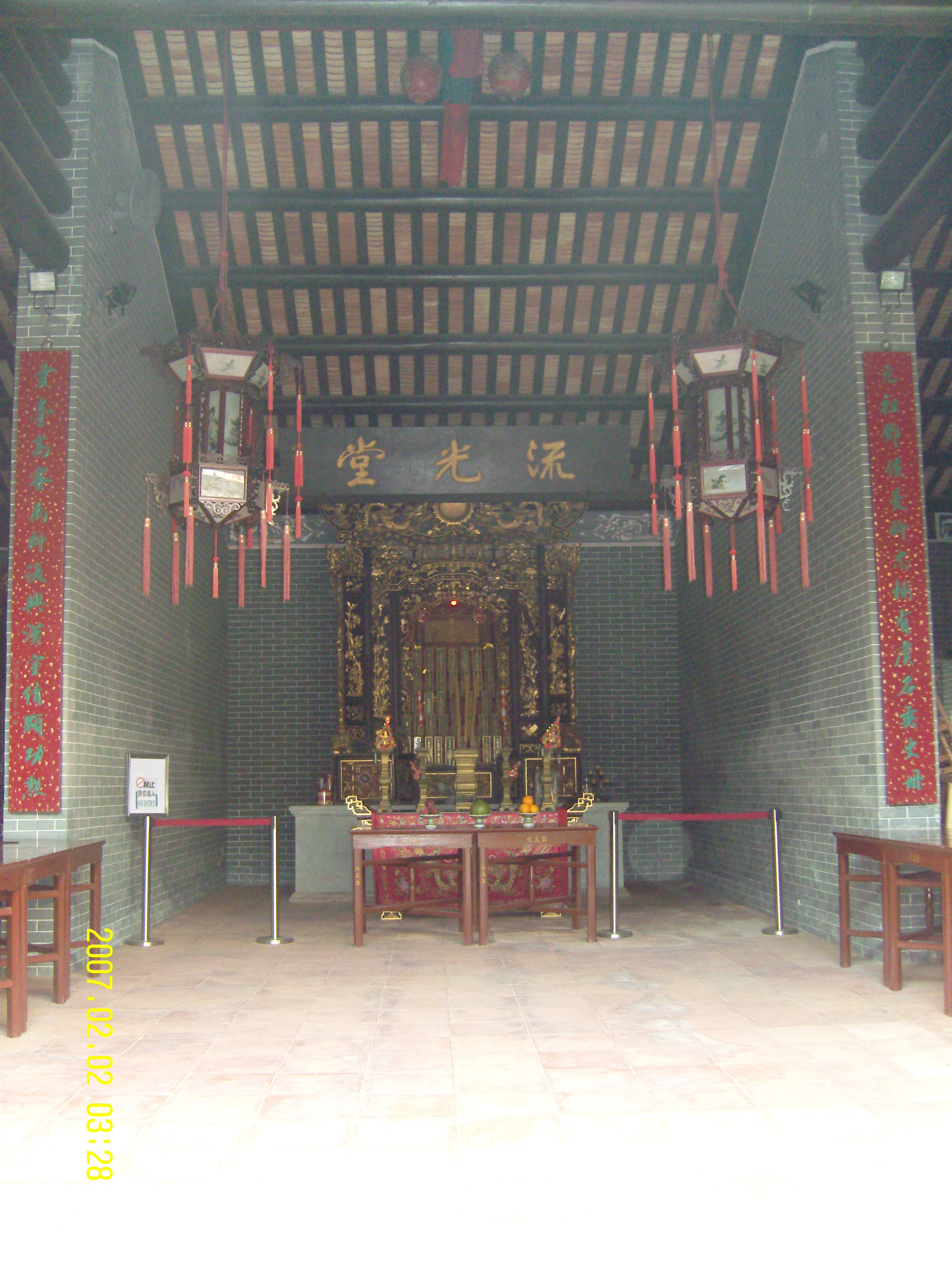
The ancestral hall after restoration

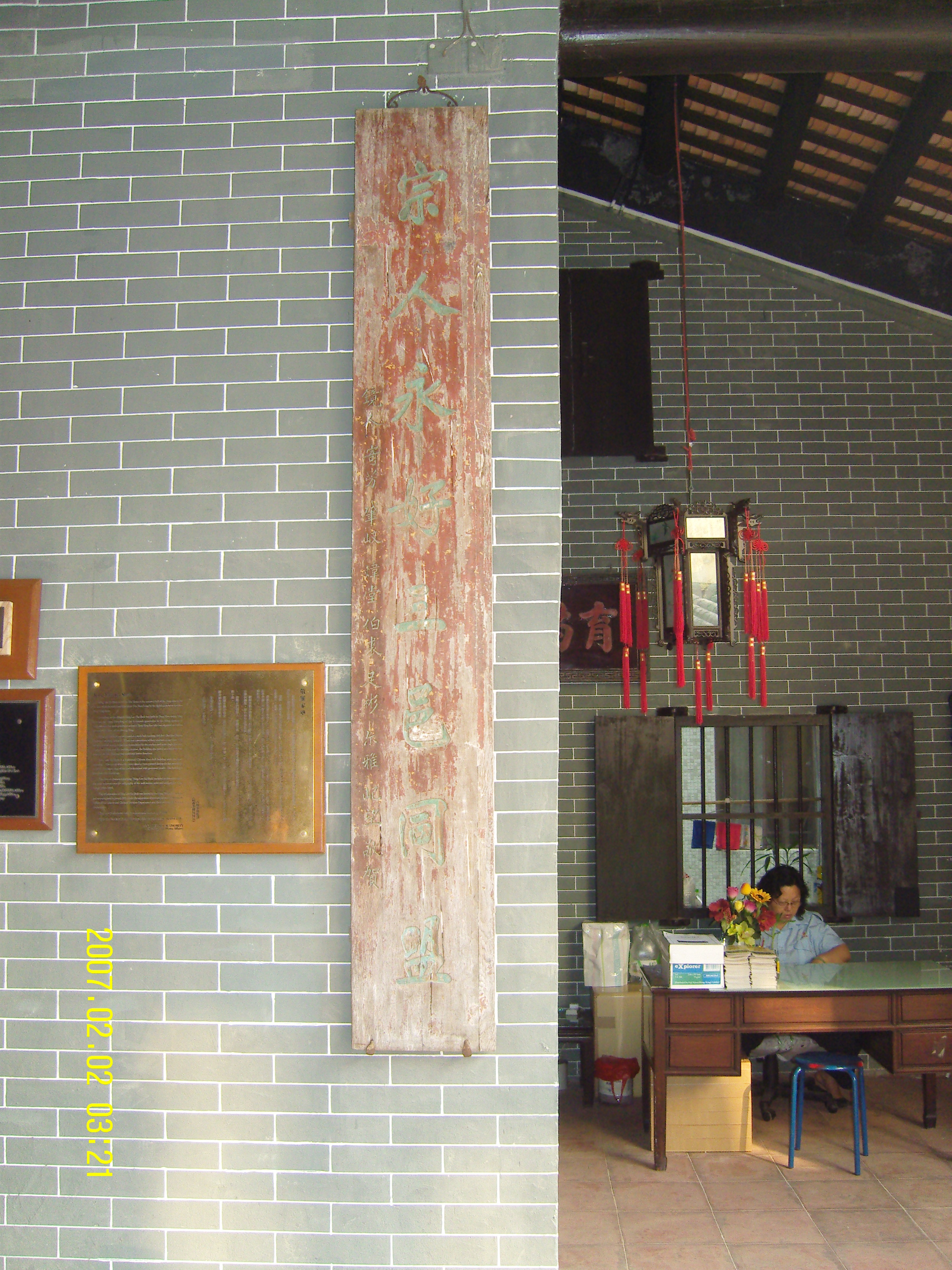
A slab denoting "CHONG REN WING HO SAM YUP TONG MENG" was restored

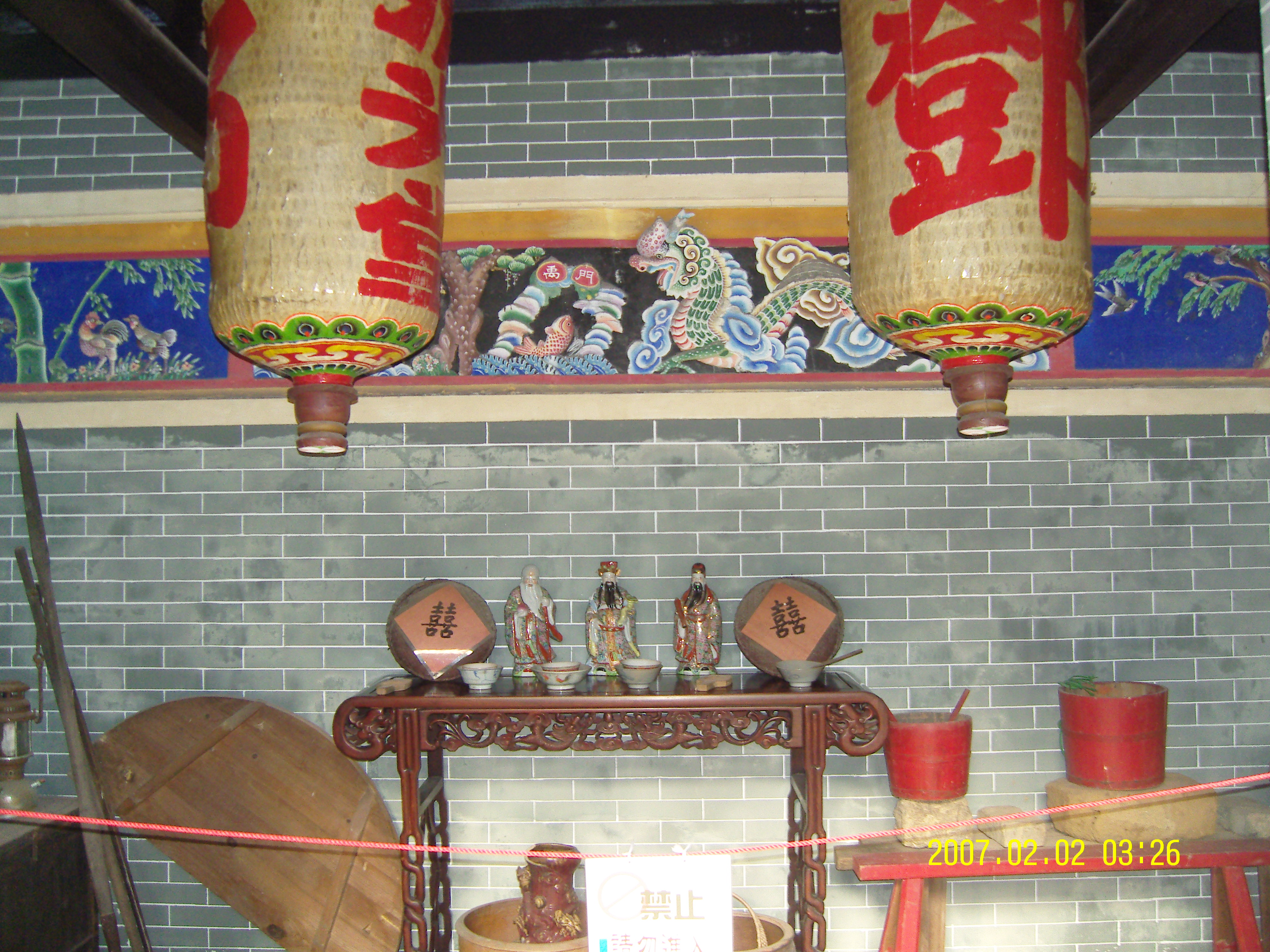
Some of the relics, like tables and statues of gods, were restored and repainted

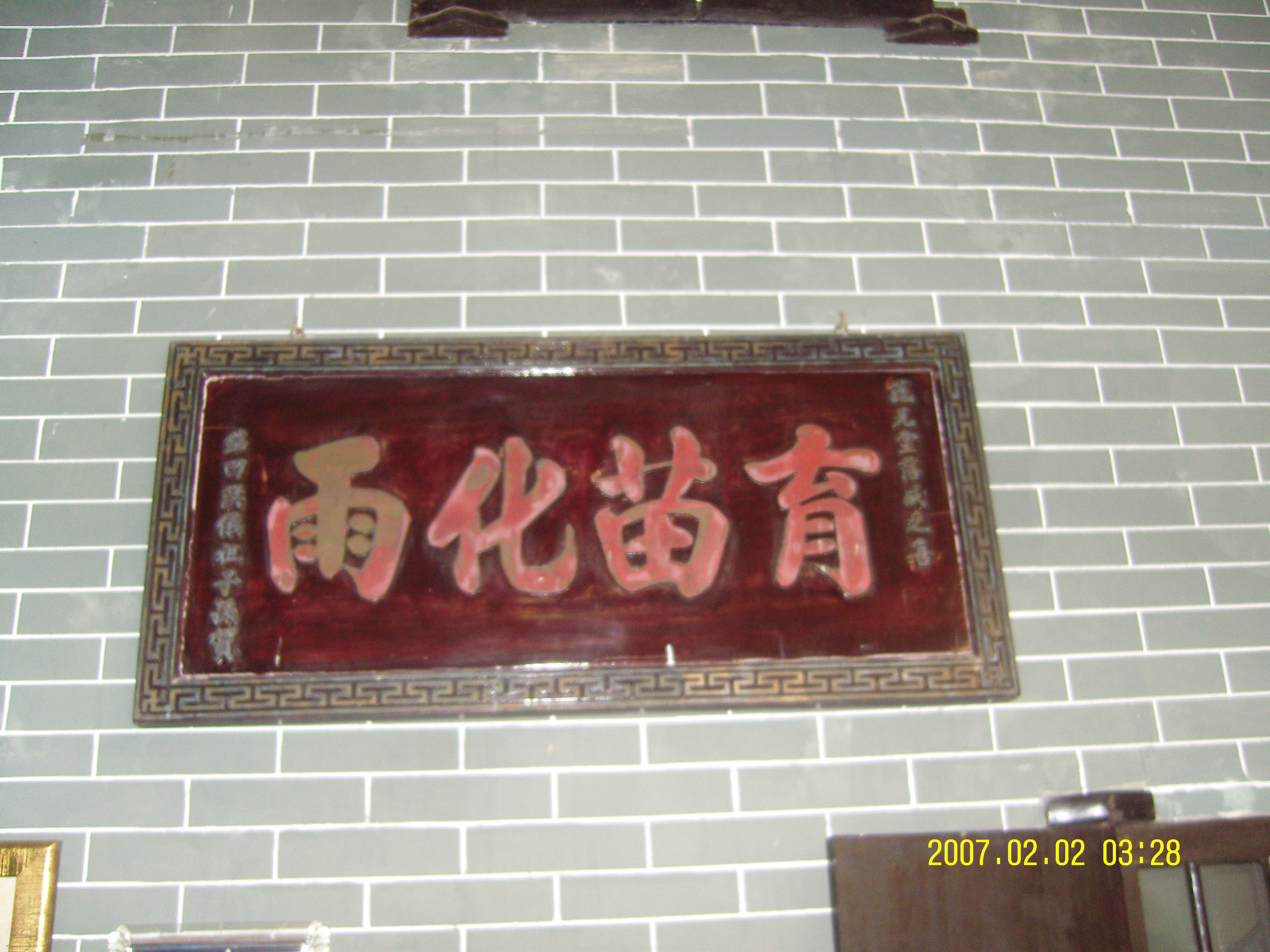
A slab was carefully repainted during restoration

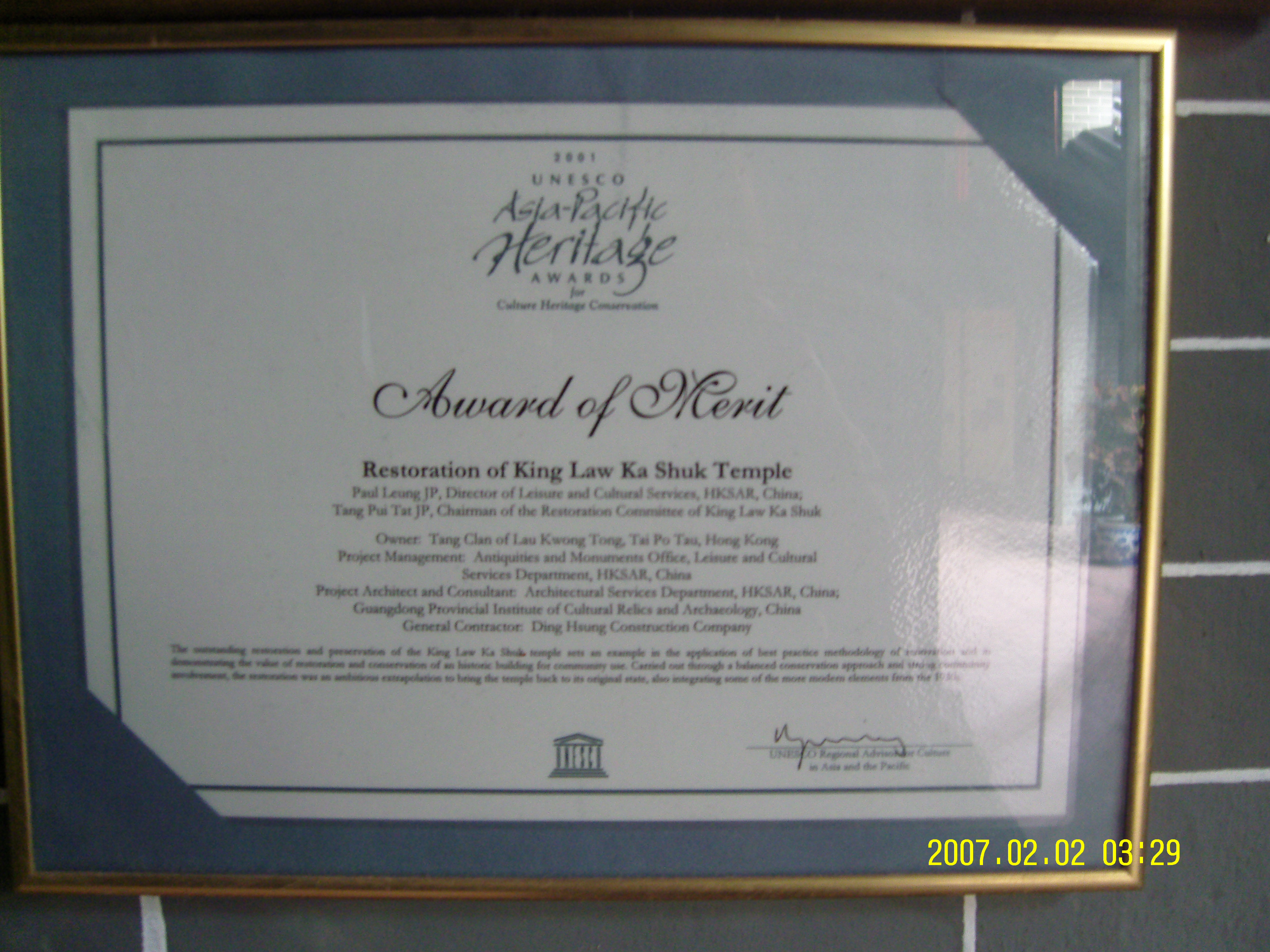
Certificate of the Award of Merit of UNESCO Asia-Pacific Heritage Awards for Culture Heritage Conservation to the restoration project of King Law Ka Shuk in 2001

== Awards ==
In 2001, the restoration of King Law Ka Shuk won an award of merit from the UNESCO Asia-Pacific Heritage Awards for Culture Heritage Conservation. The selection panel believed that this restored building was representative of the application of best practice renovation methodology. Furthermore, the building demonstrates the value of restoration and conservation of a historic building for community use, for instance, up to the present day, the ancestral hall is the exclusive venue for clan meetings and the celebration of traditional festivals.
