= Ha Wong Yi Au =

Village in Tai Po District, Hong Kong

Coordinates: 22.441985°N 114.175226°E

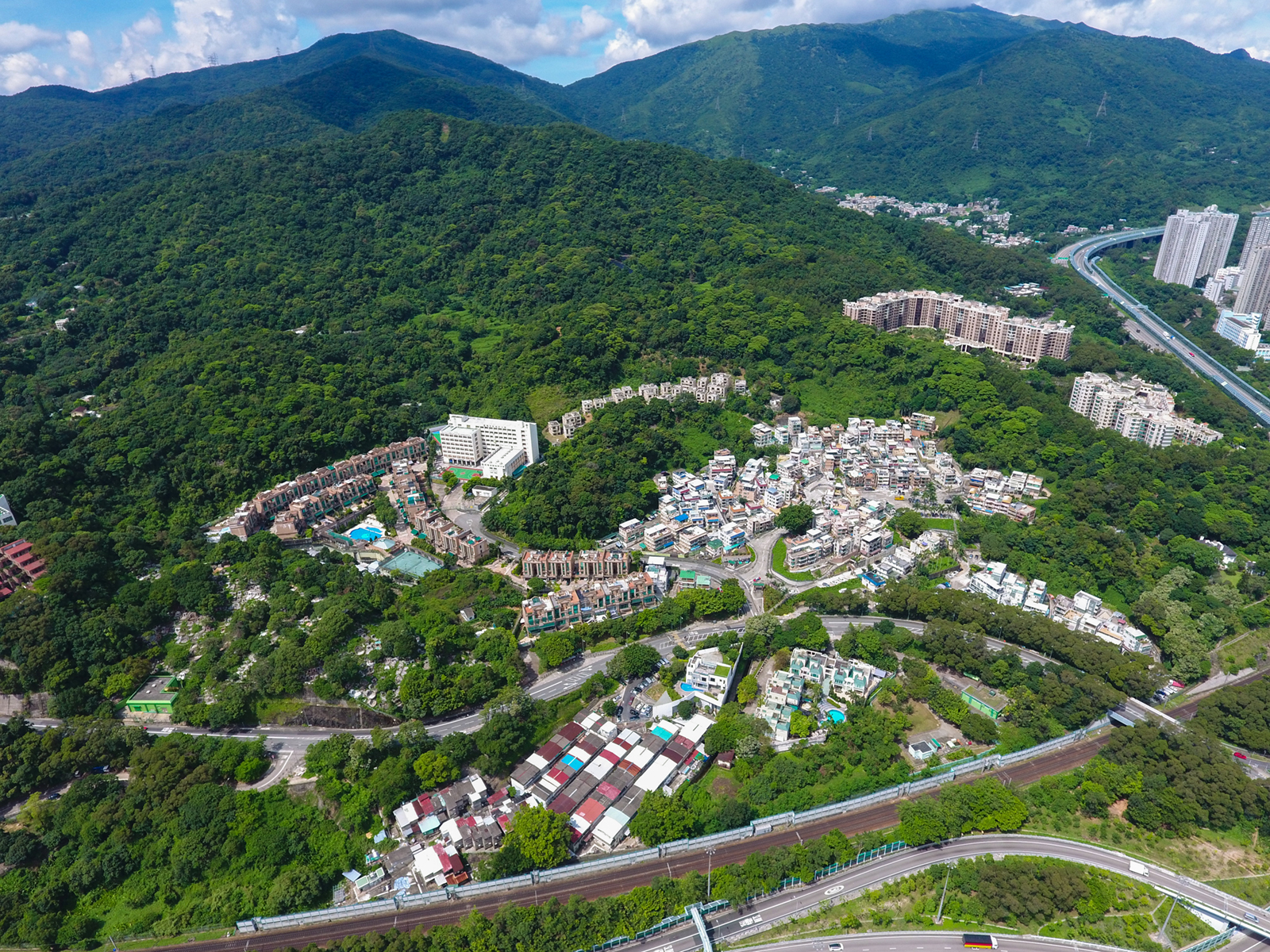
Ha Wong Yi Au surrounded by new developments in July 2017.

Ha Wong Yi Au (Chinese: 下黃宜坳) is a village in Tai Po Kau, Tai Po District, Hong Kong.

== Administration ==
Ha Wong Yi Au is a recognized village under the New Territories Small House Policy.

== History ==
At the time of the 1911 census, the population of Wong Yi Au was 114. The number of males was 43.

== See also ==
- Sheung Wong Yi Au
