= Tai Po Tau Shui Wai =

Walled village in Hong Kong

Tai Po Tau Shui Wai Chinese: 大埔頭水圍
- Village
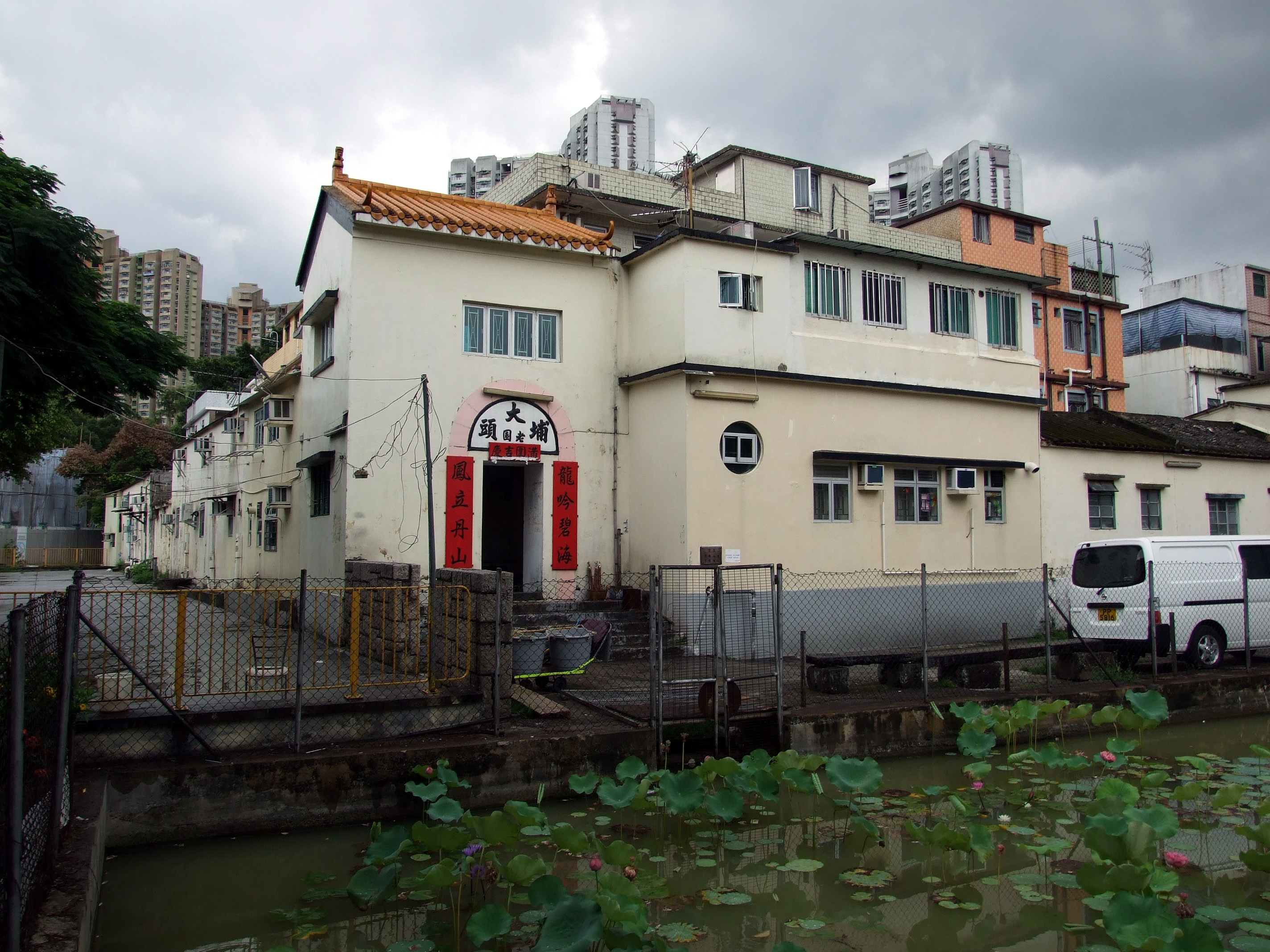
- Gate tower and pond of Tai Po Tau Shui Wai.

- Location within Hong Kong
- Coordinates: 22.452524°N 114.157438°E
- Country: People's Republic of China
- Special administrative region: Hong Kong
- District: Tai Po District
- Area: Tai Wo
- Founder: Tang Clan of Kam Tin
- Time zone: UTC+8:00 (HKT)

Tai Po Tau Shui Wai (Chinese: 大埔頭水圍) aka. Tai Po Tau Lo Wai (大埔頭老圍) is a Punti walled village in Tai Wo, Tai Po District, Hong Kong.

== Administration ==
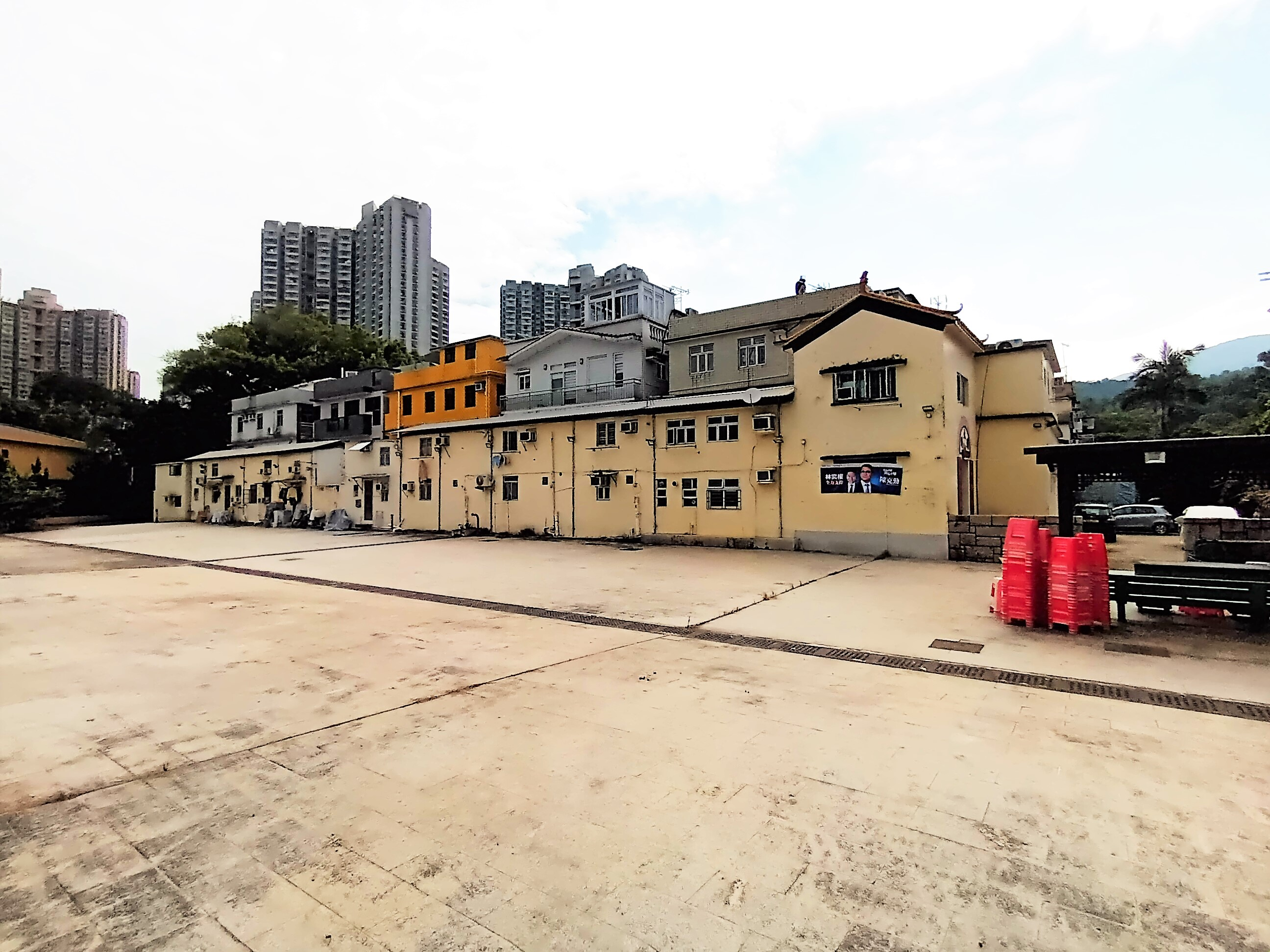
External view of Tai Po Tau Shui Wai.

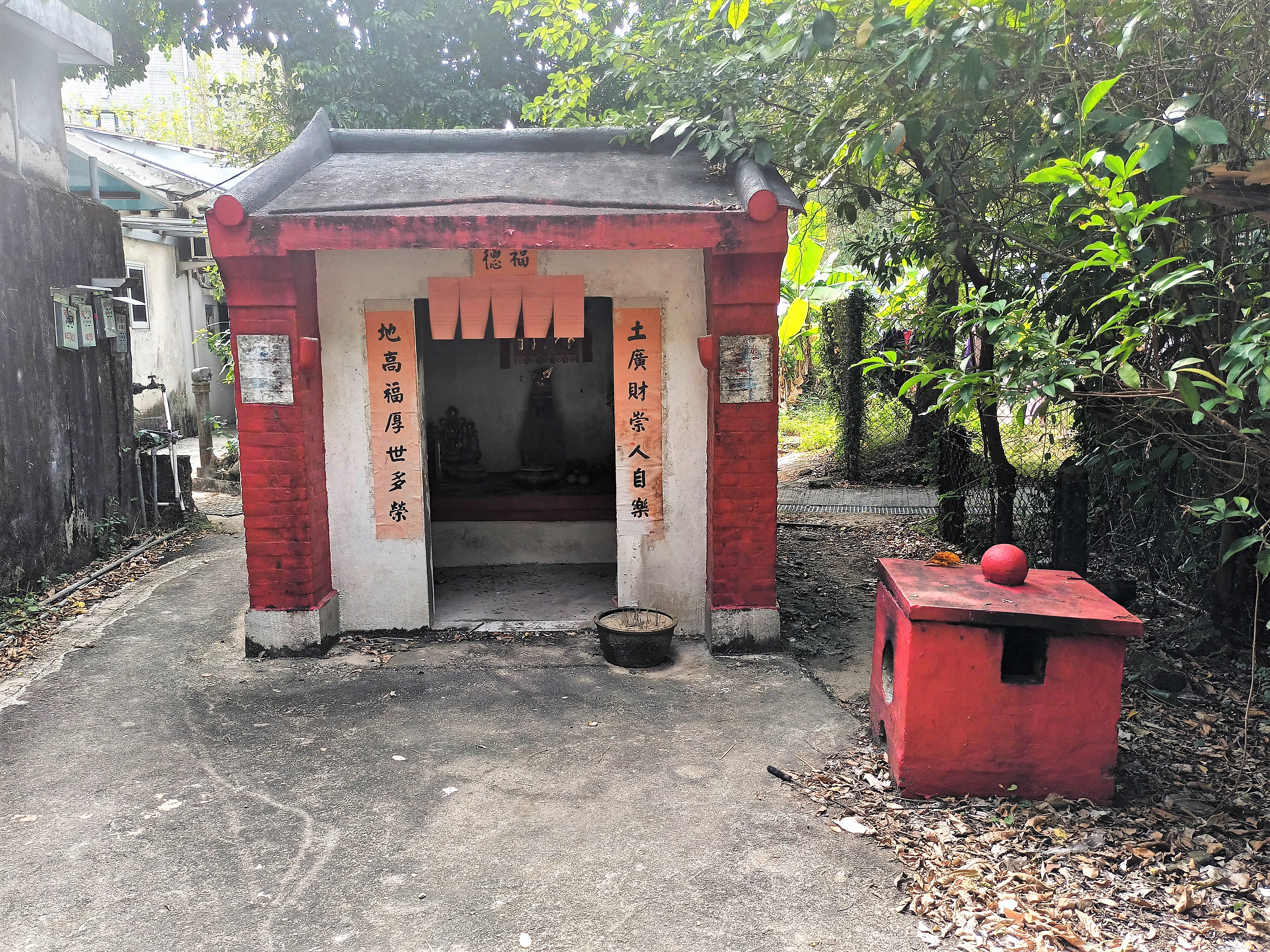
Fuk Tak (福德) Temple.

Tai Po Tau Shui Wai is a recognized village under the New Territories Small House Policy. It is one of the villages represented within the Tai Po Rural Committee. For electoral purposes, Tai Po Tau Shui Wai is part of the Po Nga constituency, which was formerly represented by Chow Yuen-wai until July 2021.

== History ==
Tai Po Tau Shui Wai was established during the Song dynasty by a branch of the Tang Clan of Kam Tin. The enclosing walls were constructed during the Ming dynasty. A part of the Clan later branched out and settled in Tai Po Tau Tsuen.

== See also ==
- Walled villages of Hong Kong
