= Museum of Ethnology (Hong Kong) =

Museum in Tai Po, Hong Kong

Coordinates: 22°26′10″N 114°11′20″E

- Traditional Chinese: 人類民俗館
Transcriptions
Yue: Cantonese
- Yale Romanization: Yàhn leuih màhn juhk gún
- Jyutping: Jan4 loei6 zuk6 gun2

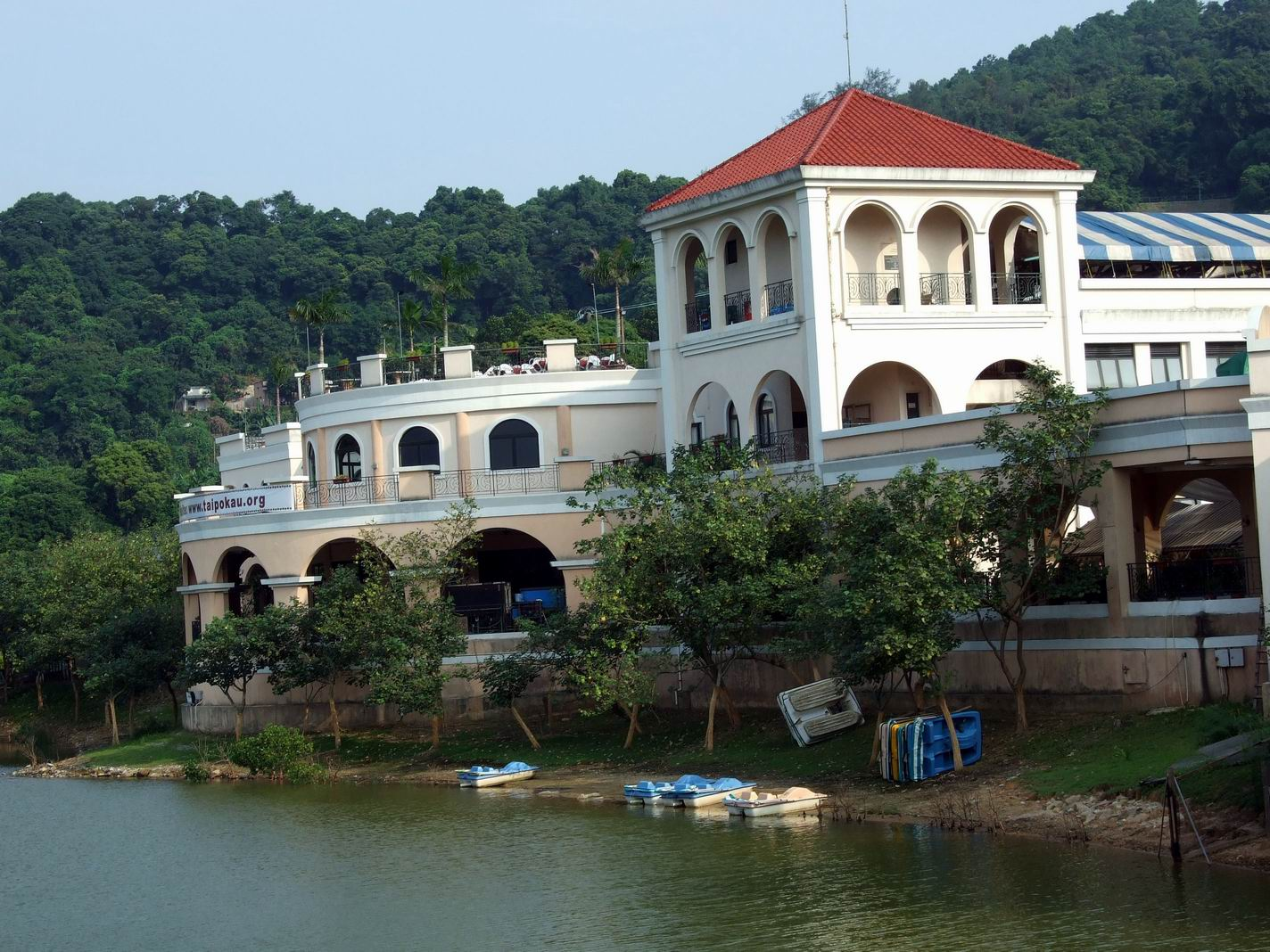
Museum of Ethnology

Museum of Ethnology is a museum located in Lake Egret Nature Park, Tai Po Kau, Tai Po District, Hong Kong.

== Transport ==
The museum is accessible within walking distance South East of Tai Po Market station of the MTR.

== See also ==
- List of museums in Hong Kong
