= Mang Gui Kiu =

Bridge in Hong Kong

Coordinates: 22.432595°N 114.185364°E

Mang Gui Kiu (also called: Haunted Bridge, Ghost Bridge) (Chinese: 猛鬼橋) is a bridge situated in Tsung Tsai Yuen (松仔園), Tai Po Kau, Tai Po District, New Territories, Hong Kong. It was originally named Hung Shui Kiu (Bridge of Flooding) for being frequently overflown by heavy rains. In 1955, a group of teachers and students from St. James' Settlement died in an accident on a day of heavy rain. Ghost haunting stories related to the incident have continued in the area ever since.

== Incident ==
Tsung Tsai Yuen is a popular picnic area due to its convenient transportation and natural scenery of trees and a miles-long river.

On 28 August 1955 at around 1:30 in the afternoon, a group of teachers and students from St. James' Settlement on a week-long camp in the nearby Tai Po Rural Orphanage were having a final picnic at Tsung Tsai Yuen before returning home. An unexpected rain came, so they sought shelter under the bridge, but most were washed away to the lower course of the river by a sudden landslide. 28 of them died with only few alive.

== Related ghost haunting stories ==
Ghost haunting stories related to the accident has never stopped after the accident. Ashen-faced children are said to wave to passing cars and hikers at night. Drivers claim to see white shapes flitting across the road nearby and mini-bus drivers said some of their passengers vanished once they got off the bus. Some families living at the area also claim to see their children holding hands and playing with air multiple times.

Still, in tradition Chinese culture, it is believed one need not to be afraid of supernatural if he is an upright man who has never affront any spirits. It was said a bus driver was driving past the Mang Gui Kiu without any passengers on board. A woman with long hair and pale face got on the bus. But the driver only found joss paper in the cashbox. The angry driver shouted ‘Lady, please pay the fee!’ but received no answer. He found that there was nobody on the bus. He reckoned the woman was a ghost but stayed calm and kept on driving not to offend the spirit. When he drove to the next bus stop, the signal light was on. He stopped the bus and opened the door but suddenly heard a voice saying, "Thank you."

== Myth ==
It was said Dan Kwai Village near Mang Gui Kiu was an execution ground during the Second Sino-Japanese War. The blood of the deceased washed into the sea and the water became red. Therefore, the bridge was named Hung Shui Kiu (and later also called the Mang Gui Kiu), in which "Hung" means "flood" and sounds the same as the word "red" in Chinese language. Years later, villagers heard the marching sound of soldiers and witnessed a ghost at midnight. But the truth as to whether executions were indeed carried out at the village is unknown.

== Present ==
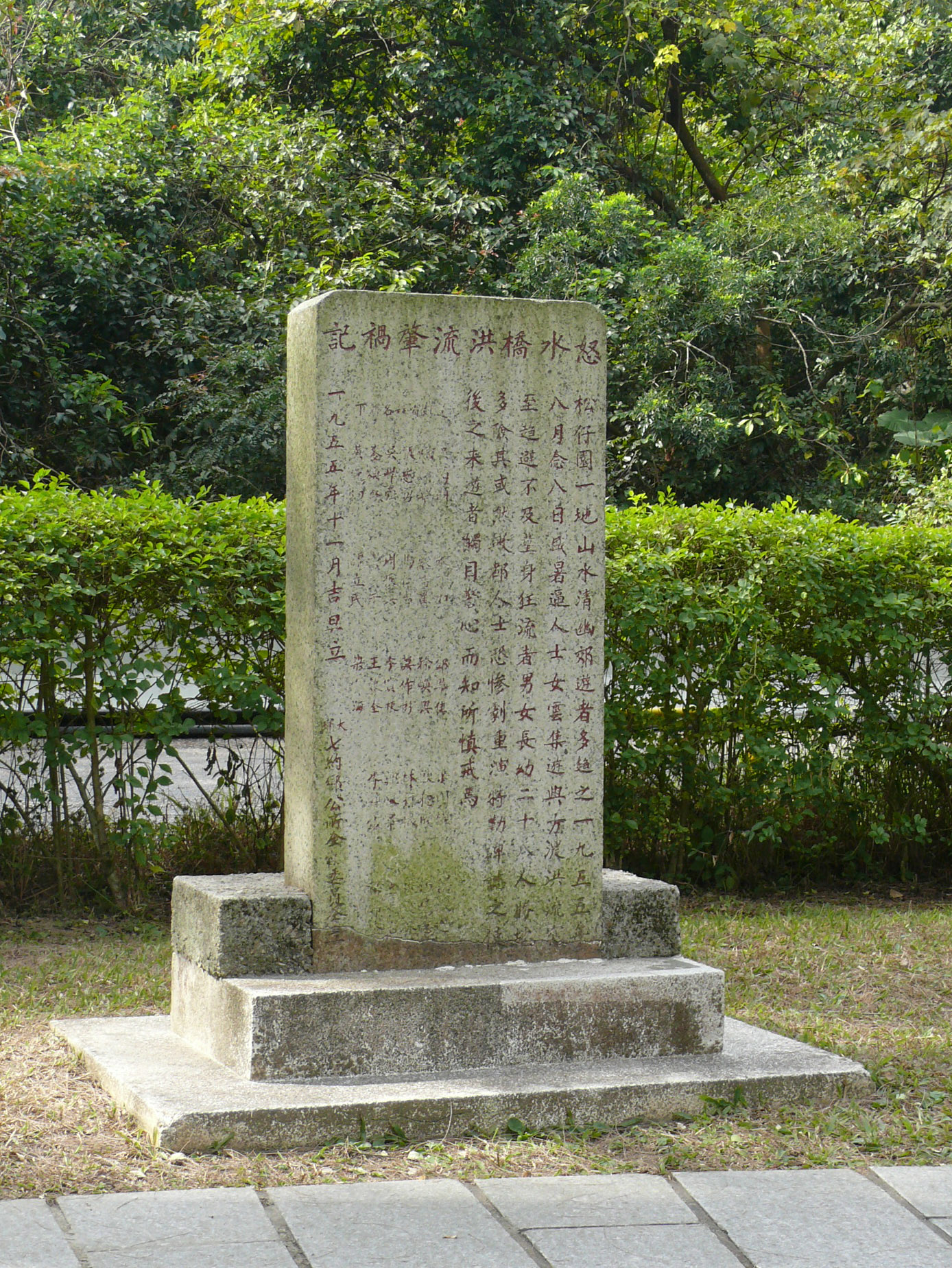
Stone Plaque

After the accident, the Tai Po Tsat Yeuk Rural Committee erected a stone plaque to commemorate the tragedy and to placate the restless spirits.

To avoid similar accident from happening, the Hong Kong Government constructed a dam on the head-stream to reduce impulse generated by the flash floods. The downstream area where bodies are found was turned to a private housing estates.

The original Mang Gui Giu has need replaced by a reinforced concrete bridge after several road works and thus no longer exists. Yet, constant car accidents on Tai Po Road close to the original Mang Gui Giu site continues to bring more para-normality to the haunting place.
