= Tai Po Kau =

Area in Hong Kong

Coordinates: 22.4380°N 114.1876°E

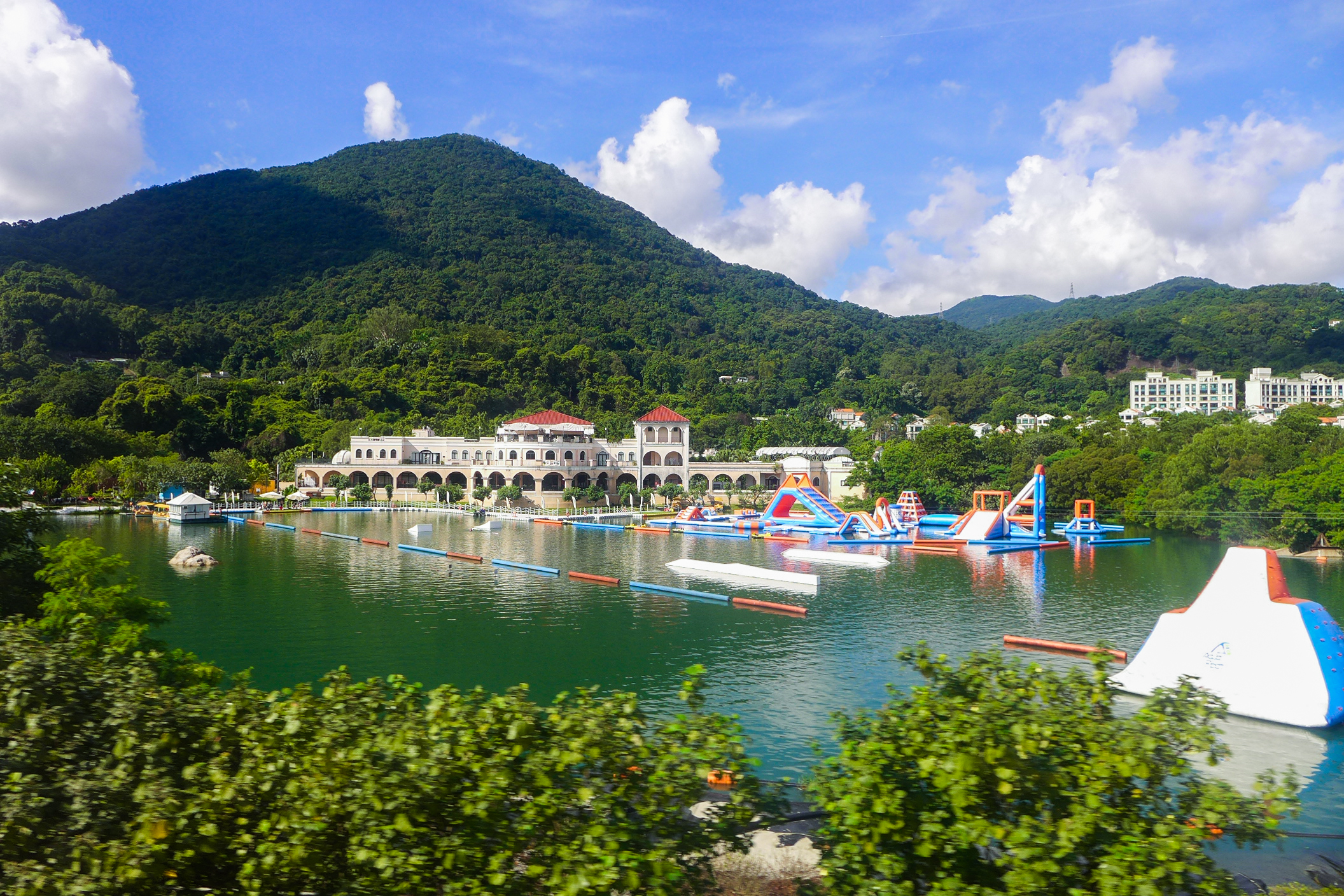
Tai Po Kau.

Tai Po Kau (Chinese: 大埔滘) is an area and a village south of the town of Tai Po in Hong Kong, which was the site of the former Tai Po Kau station on the Kowloon–Canton Railway. It is located at a river estuary that empties into Tolo Harbour.

== Administration ==
Tai Po Kau is a recognized village under the New Territories Small House Policy.

== See also ==
- Ha Wong Yi Au
- Mang Gui Kiu
- Museum of Ethnology (Hong Kong)
- Tai Po Kau Nature Reserve
- Tai Po Lookout
