= Old District Office North =

Former government building in Hong Kong

Coordinates: 22.445706°N 114.170622°E

- Traditional Chinese: 舊北區理民府
Transcriptions
Yue: Cantonese
- Yale Romanization: Gauh bāk kēui léih màhn fú
- Jyutping: Gau6 bak1 koei1 lei5 man4 fu2

Law Ting Pong Scout Centre
- Traditional Chinese: 羅定邦童軍中心
Transcriptions
Yue: Cantonese
- Yale Romanization: Lòh dihng bōng tùhng gwān jūng sām
- Jyutping: Lo4 ding6 bong1 tung4 gwan1 zung1 sam1

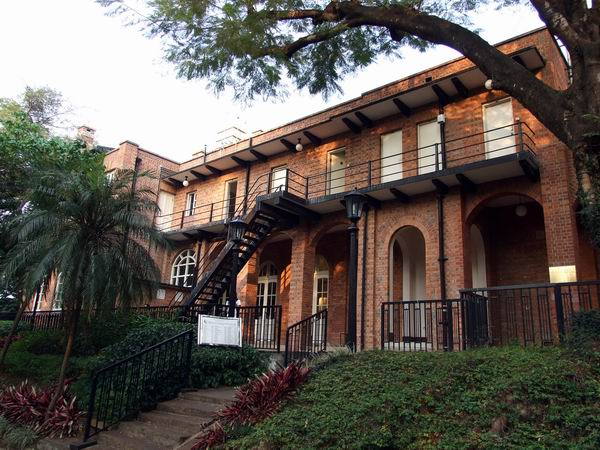
Old District Office North

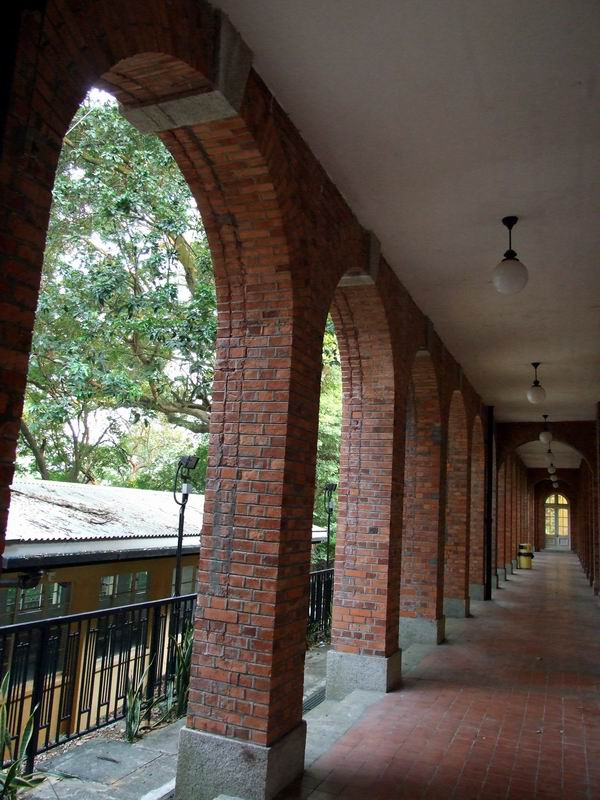
Verandah

The Old District Office North, or the Law Ting Pong Scout Centre, is a building located at 20 Wan Tau Kok Lane, Tai Po in the New Territories of Hong Kong, near the Old Tai Po Police Station.

The building was the headquarter of the colonial District Office of the whole New Territories. Since the 1920s, it only administrative the northern part of the New Territories, as the District Office South was established.

== History ==
The Old District Office North was built around 1907 and was the earliest seat of the colonial civil administration of the New Territories. Administration and land registration of the northern part of the New Territories were carried out in this building. The building still housed a magistrate's court until 1961.

== Conservation ==
The building was declared a monument on 13 November 1981. It is now used by the New Territories Eastern Region Headquarters of The Scout Association of Hong Kong.
