= Old Tai Po Police Station =

Coordinates: 22.446422°N 114.169735°E

- 舊大埔警署
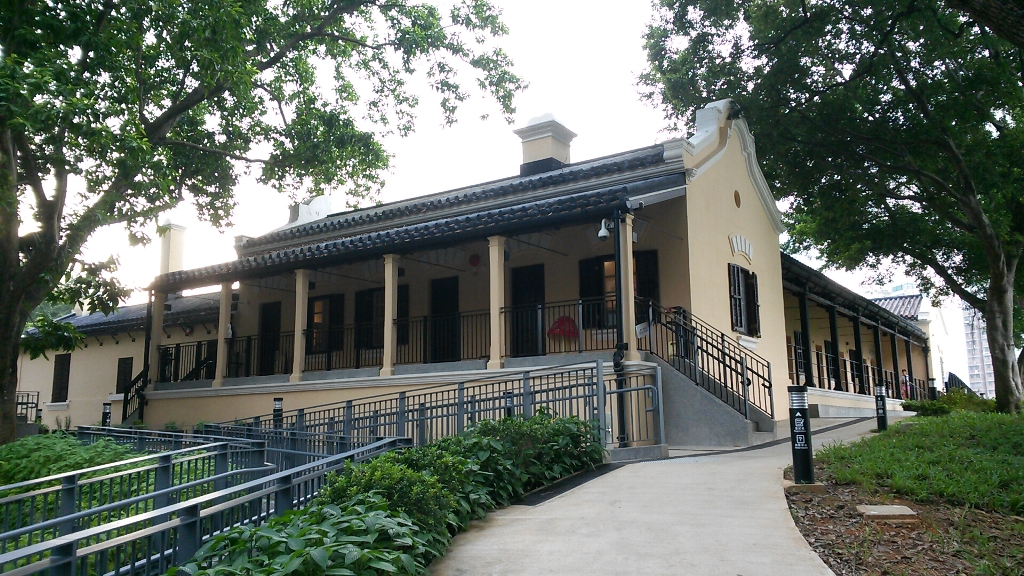
- Old Tai Po Police Station in 2015
- Interactive map of the Old Tai Po Police Station area

General information
- Type: Police station
- Location: Wan Tau Tong Hill, Tai Po, New Territories, 11 Wan Tau Kok Lane, Hong Kong
- Opened: 1899; 127 years ago
- Closed: 1987; 39 years ago

Declared Monument of Hong Kong
- Designated: 16 July 2021; 5 years ago
- Reference no.: 128

Old Tai Po Police Station
- Traditional Chinese: 舊大埔警署
Transcriptions
Yue: Cantonese
- Yale Romanization: Gauh daaih bou gíng chyúh
- Jyutping: Gau6 daai6 bou3 ging2 cyu5

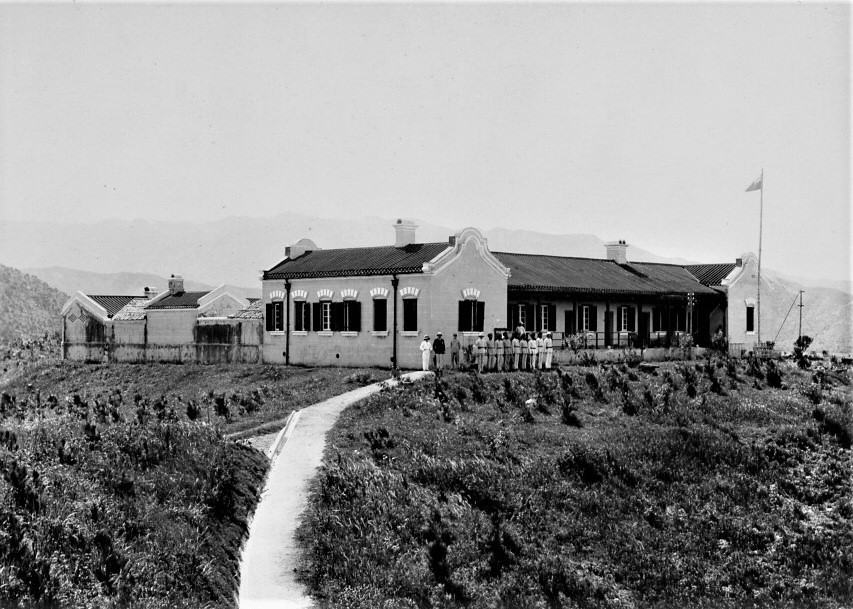
Tai Po Police Station in 1901

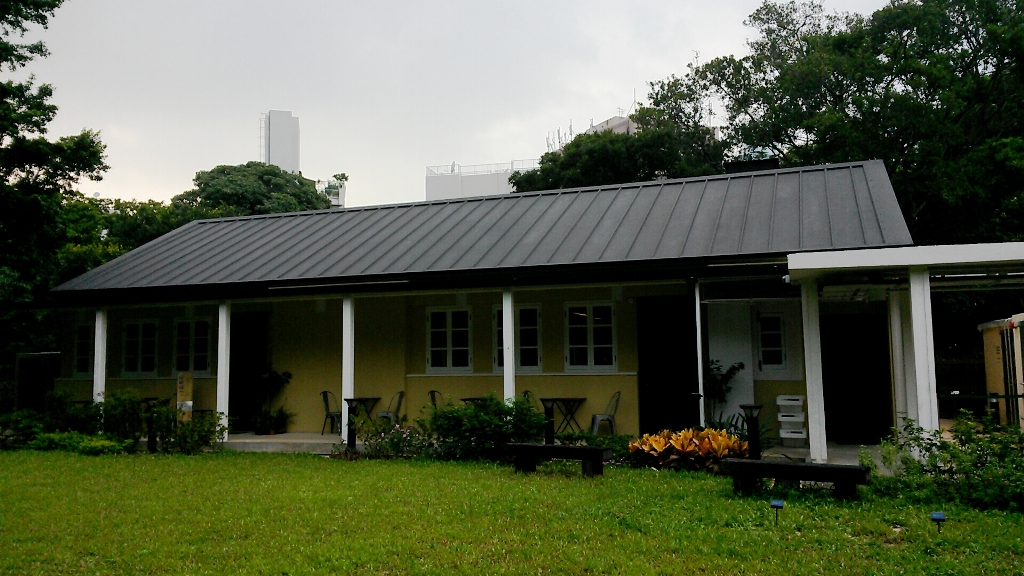
Canteen Block in 2015

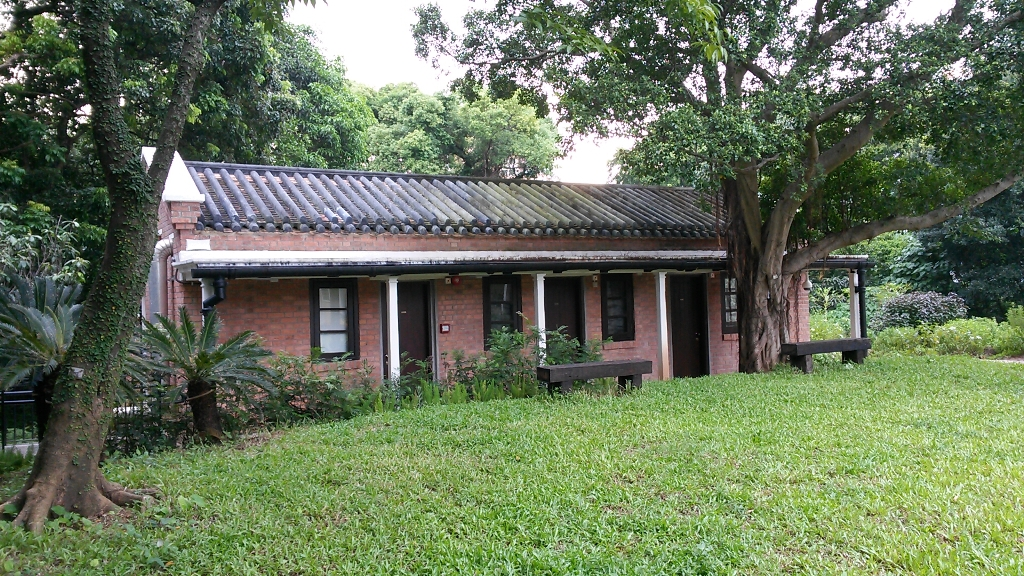
Staff Quarters Block Block in 2015

The Old Tai Po Police Station is a former Hong Kong police station at the top of Tai Po Wan Tau Tong Hill. It is located at No. 11 Wan Tau Kok Lane, Tai Po, New Territories, Hong Kong, near the Old District Office North.

== History ==
The Old Tai Po Police Station was built in 1899, shortly after the British leased the New Territories in 1898. It was the first police station and police headquarters in the New Territories. It is said to have been built at the site of the British flag raising ceremony which marked the official British takeover of the New Territories. It operated as a police station until the new district police station of Tai Po started its service in 1987.

== Conservation ==
The Old Tai Po Police Station was listed as a Grade II historic building from 1988 to 2021. In 2008, it was part of the seven buildings of Batch I of the Hong Kong Government's Revitalising Historic Buildings Through Partnership Scheme seeking adaptive reuse of government-owned historic buildings. The project was awarded by UNESCO Asia Pacific Heritage Awards in 2016 with honourable mention. The Old Tai Po Police Station was declared a monument on 16 July 2021.

== See also ==
- Revitalising Historic Buildings Through Partnership Scheme
- Historic police station buildings in Hong Kong
