= Tai Po =

Area in Hong Kong

Coordinates: 22.445°N 114.170°E

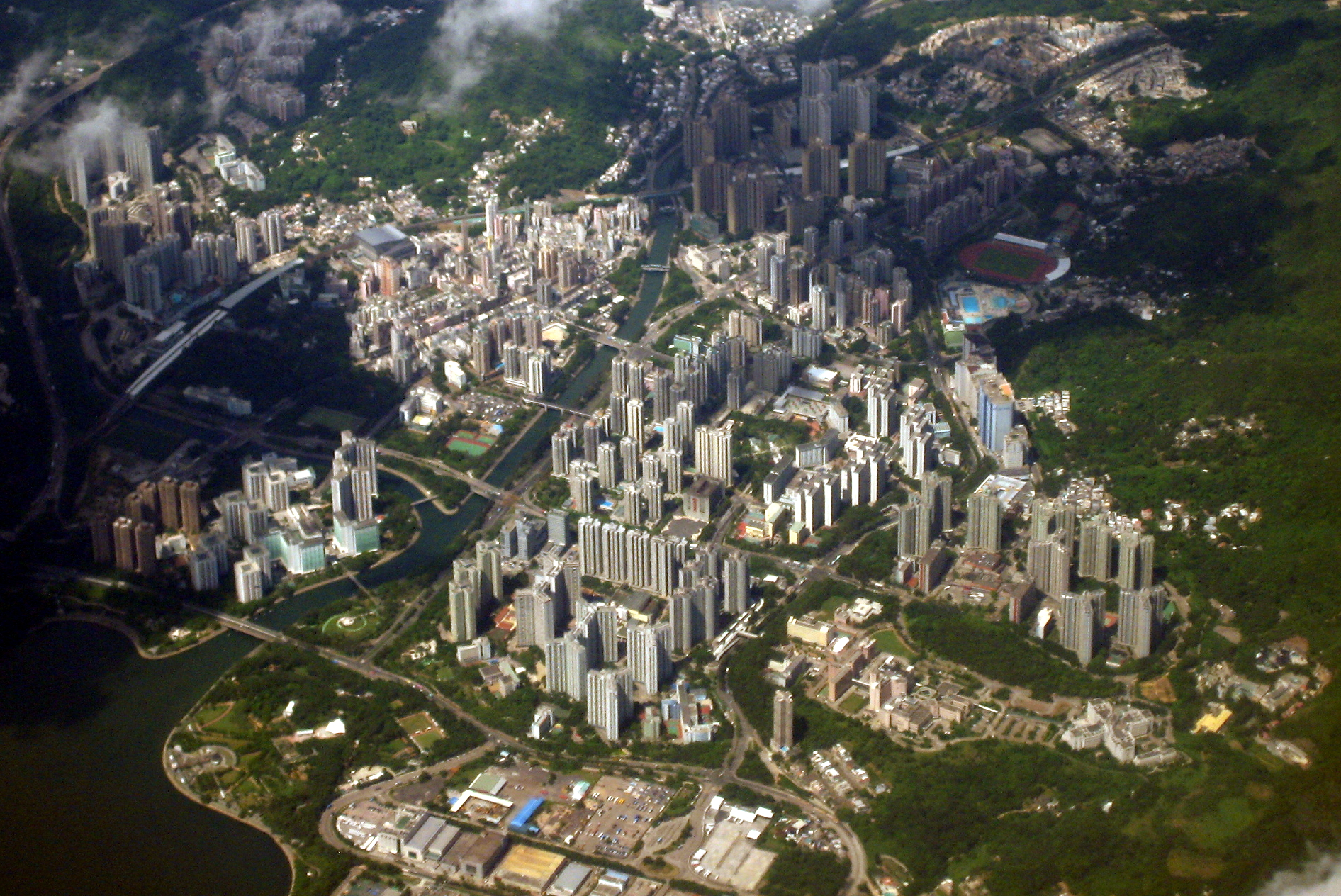
- Aerial view of Tai Po New Town, including Tai Po Market
- Traditional Chinese: 大埔
- Simplified Chinese: 大埔
Transcriptions
Standard Mandarin
- Hanyu Pinyin: Dàpǔ
Yue: Cantonese
- Jyutping: daai^{6} bou^{3}
- IPA: [tàːi pōu]

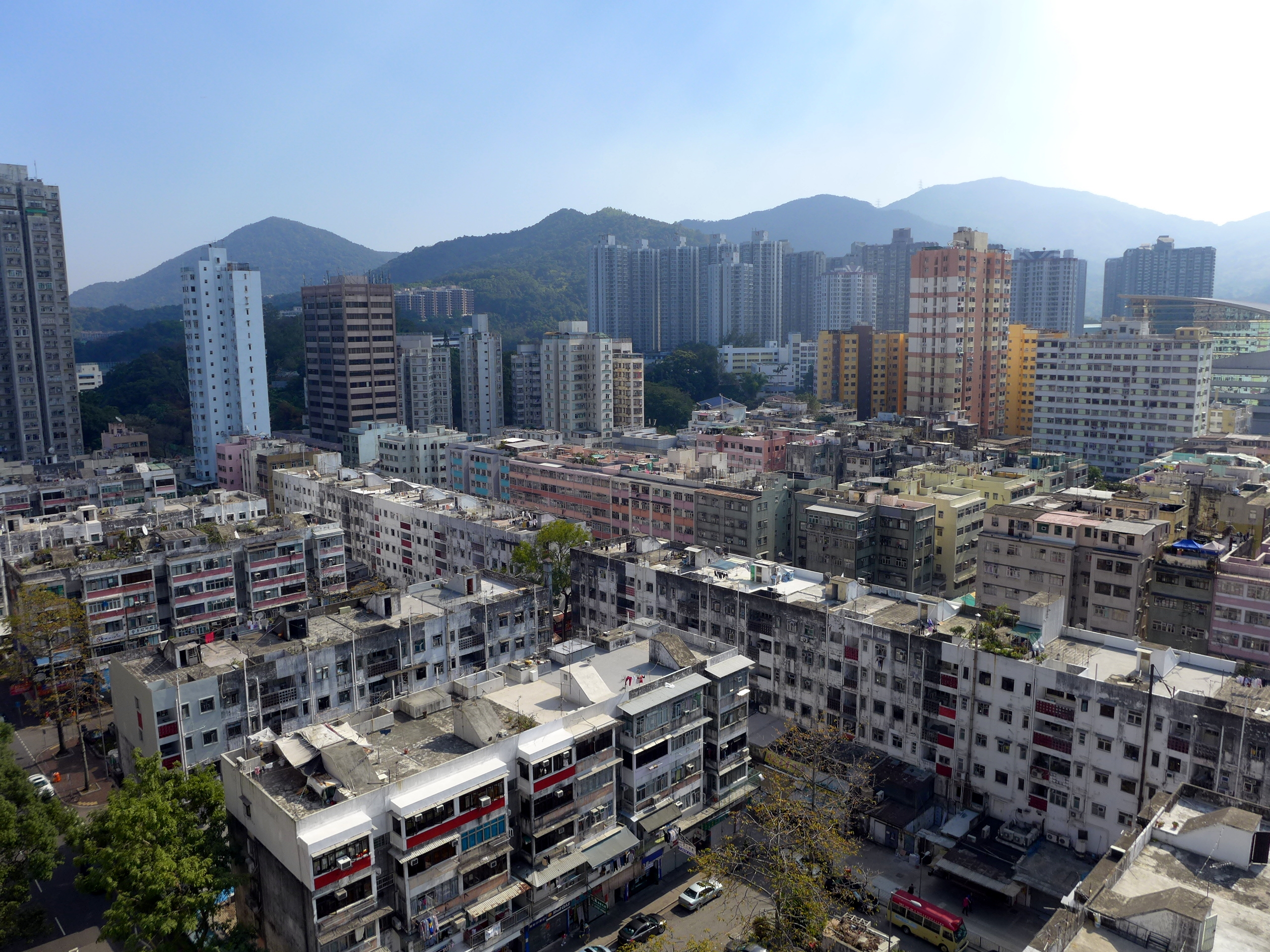
Tai Po Market. Older low-level buildings in the foreground contrast with high-rise commercial buildings in the distance

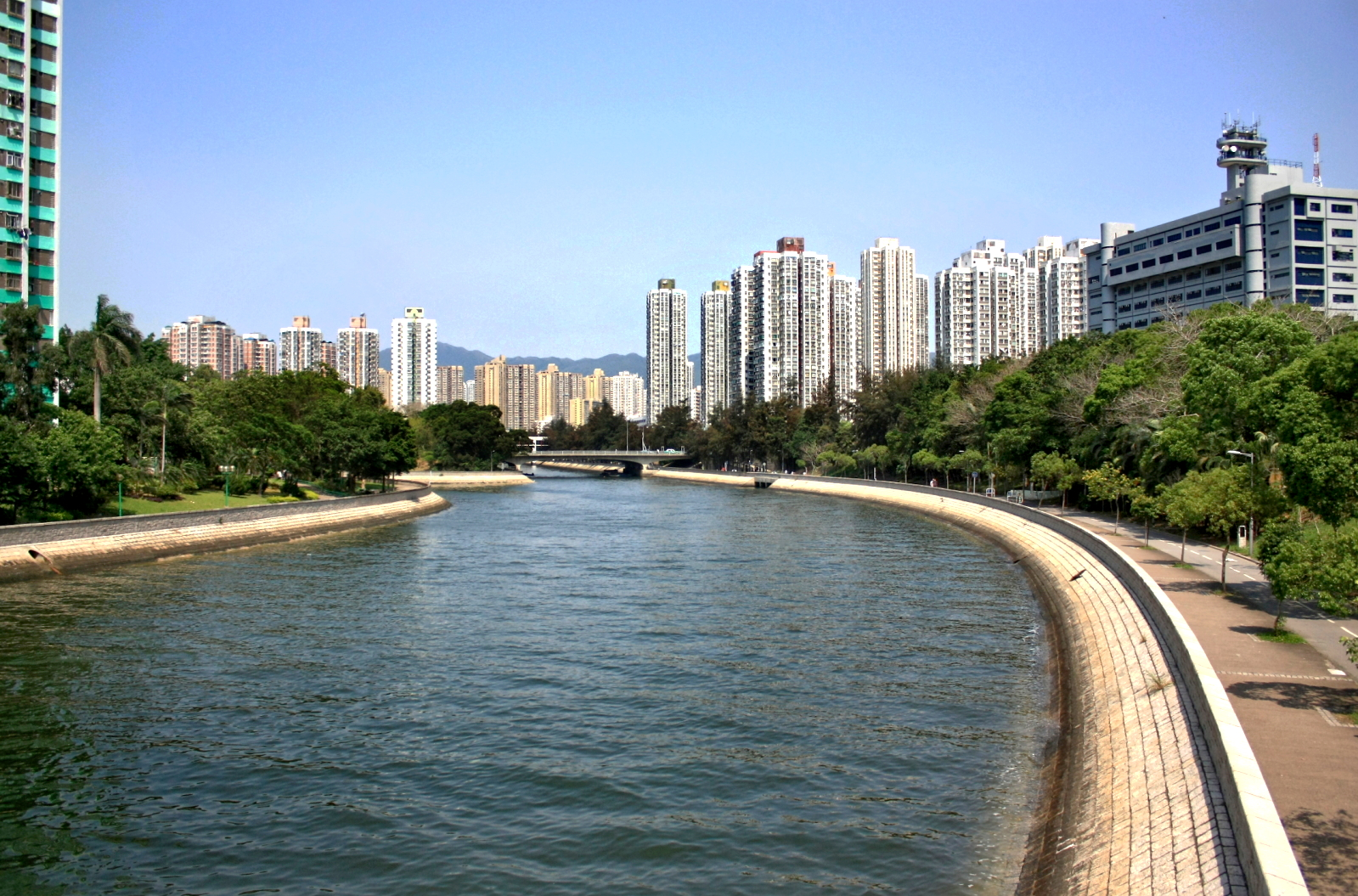
Lam Tsuen River

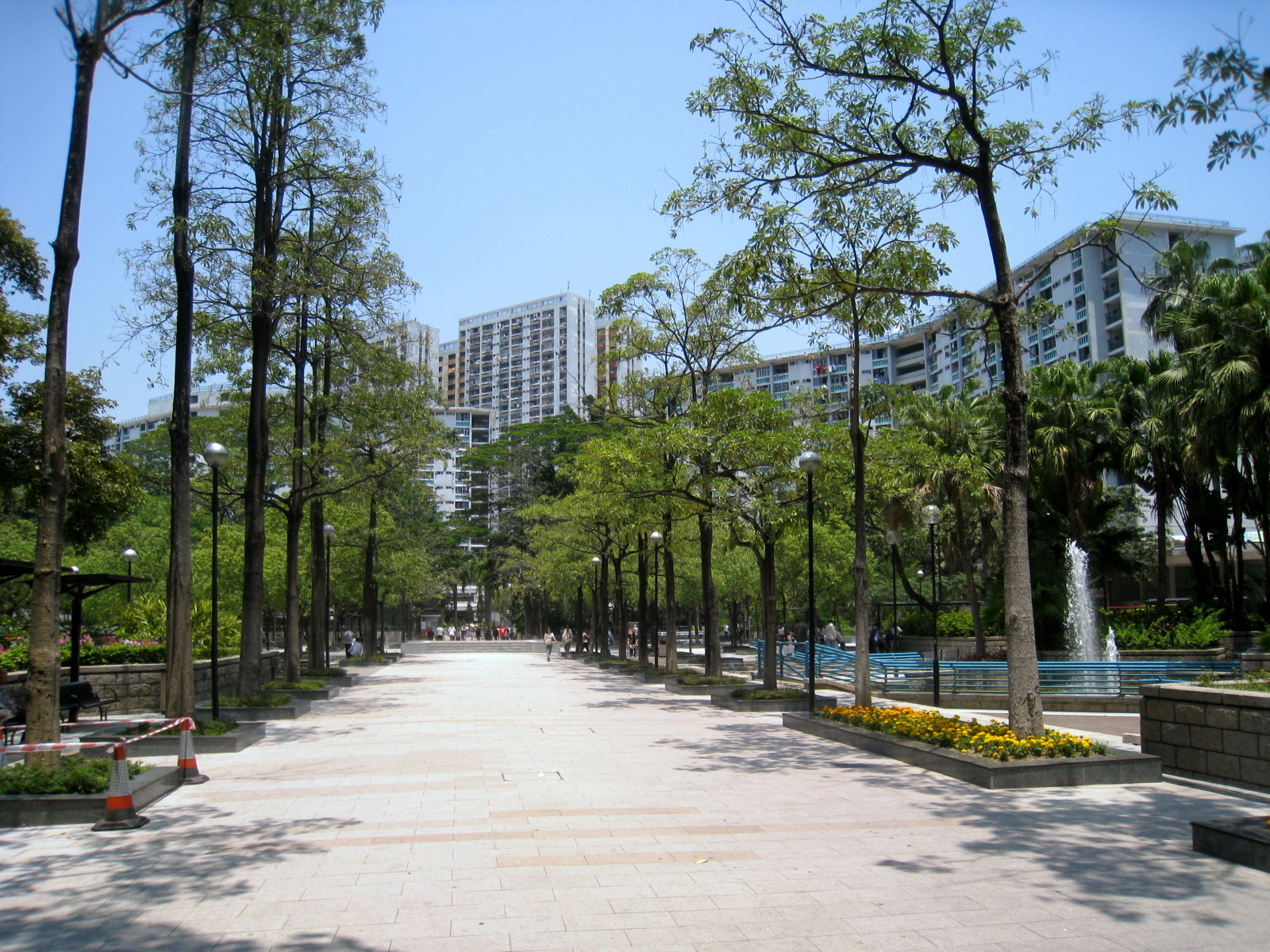
Tai Po Central Town Square

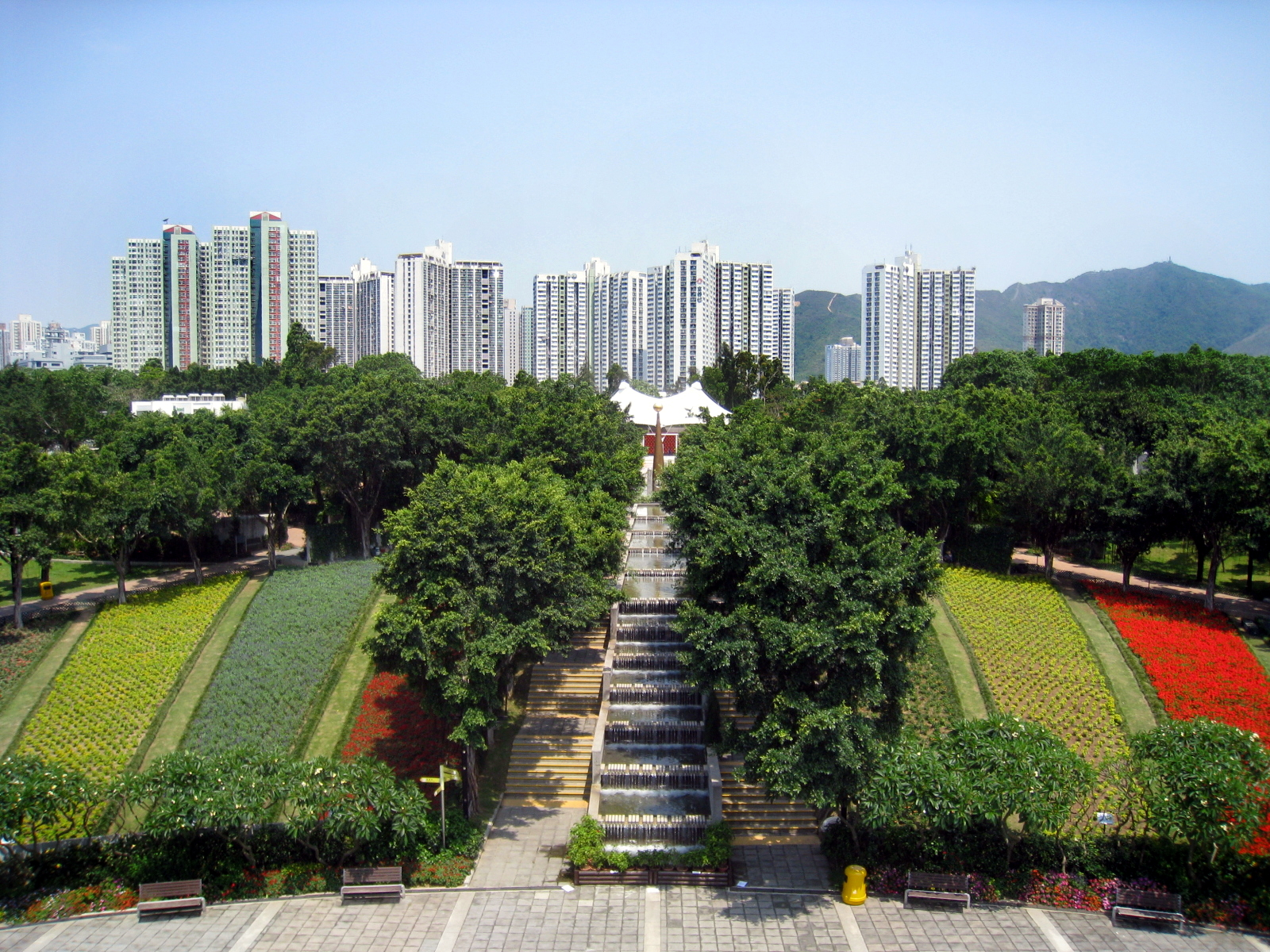
Tai Po Waterfront Park and Fu Shin Estate

Tai Po /ˌtaɪˈpoʊ/ is an area in the New Territories of Hong Kong. It refers to the vicinity of the traditional market towns in the area presently known as Tai Po Old Market or Tai Po Kau Hui (大埔舊墟, the original "Tai Po Market") on the north of Lam Tsuen River and the Tai Po Hui (the current Tai Po Market; historically Tai Wo Shi, lit. 'Tai Wo market') on Fu Shin Street on the south of the Lam Tsuen River, near the old Tai Po Market railway station of the Kowloon-Canton Railway (British Section). Both market towns became part of the Tai Po New Town in the late 1970s and early 1980s. In present-day usage, "Tai Po" may refer to the area around the original market towns, the Tai Po New Town (大埔市), or the entire Tai Po District.

== Etymology ==
In Chinese, Tai Po (大埔) was formerly written as 大步. Treating the Chinese characters separately, the pronunciation of Po in the third tone (Chinese: 埔; Jyutping: bou3; Cantonese Yale: bou; lit. 'port') in Cantonese is shared across many words, not only Po in the sixth tone (步; bou6; bouh; 'Step'), e.g., the "Po" (埗) in Sham Shui Po (lit. 'deep water port'). Moreover, according to the Kangxi Dictionary, the word 埠; 'port' can be written as 步. As a coincidence, Tai Po is a seashore town. The name Tai Po Hoi (大步海; 'Tai Po sea') appeared in Nanhai Zhi (南海志) of the Yuan dynasty (1271 to 1368 of Gregorian calendar), which stated that pearls were a product of the Tai Po sea. In the Ming dynasty Yue Daji (粵大記; jyut6 daai6 gei3), the names Tai Po Hoi and Tai Po Tau (大步頭) are recorded. In the attached map of that text, the sea next to Tai Po Tau was labelled with "can shelter from hurricanes" (可泊颶風). In the early Qing dynasty Kangxi 27th Year edition of the Xin'an Xianzhi, Tai Po Tau Hui (lit. 'Tai Po Tau market') as a market centre (墟市), Tai Po Tau as a village, under the administration of 六都 (luk6 dou1), and Tai Po Hoi as a body of water, were recorded. According to Hong Kong sinologist and historian Jao Tsung-I, the character Po in Tai Po should be understood as port or seaside.

However, there is also an urban legend version of the meaning of Tai Po. In this urban legend, the area around Tai Po was a habitat of a wild animal, which people have to "Big-Step".

== History ==
Tai Po as a populated place, could be traced back to the Stone Age. An archaeological site in Yuen Chau Tsai, had discovered stone axe and pottery which was believed to be made in Neolithic era. The indigenous inhabitants of Tai Po lived by clamming and pearl farming in Tai Po Hoi (lit. 'Tai Po Sea'; Tolo Harbour) since at least AD 963. The pearl making business reached its peak during the Song dynasty and started to decline gradually amid the Ming dynasty. Tai Po had been developed as a fishing port around the late Ming dynasty and the Qing dynasty. While a village that belongs to the modern day Tai Po area, Wun Yiu (碗窰), had developed into a centre of the porcelain industry in the Ming dynasty.

Tang clan migrated from the area north of the border of modern-day Hong Kong to the modern-day New Territories of Hong Kong in the Song dynasty of China. A branch of the Tang clan was split from Lung Yeuk Tau of the modern-day New Territories, to establish the village in Tai Po Tau. The Tai Po Tau branch and Lung Yeuk Tau branch also founded the first Tai Po Hui market town (also known as Tai Po Tau Hui), despite it is now defunct and the area now known as Tai Po Old Market. The area around the first market town also lived other people that were not from the Tang clan. They formed an inter-villages alliance Tai Po Tsat Yeuk (lit. 'Tai Po Seven Alliances'; each alliance contained one or more villages). The inter-villages alliance founded another market town Tai Wo Shi (lit. 'Tai Wo market') after the Qing government ruled that Tai Po Hui (Tai Po Tau Hui) belonged to Tangs, other clans cannot open shops in Tang's market town. However, Tai Wo Shi replaced the original Tai Po Hui (Tai Po Tau Hui) as the main market and took the name Tai Po Hui (anglicized as Tai Po Market). The old market town thus became Tai Po Kau Hui (anglicized as Tai Po Old Market; Jyutping: daai6 bou3 gau6 heoi1).

During the British colonial rule, a District Office, a police station, two railway stations: Tai Po Market railway station and Tai Po Kau railway station (in Tai Po Kau; Jyutping: daai6 bou3 gaau3) and other public facilities were built within the modern-day area that belongs to the new town and the administrative district. Most of them were in close distance to the market town of Tai Po at that time.

In the 1970s, the Hong Kong government began to develop satellite towns: Tai Po Industrial Estate, the first industrial estate in Hong Kong was built in the reclaimed land of the former Tai Po Hoi in 1974; Tai Po was named as a site to build "new town" in 1979, which the government obtains lands by reclamation of the river mouth and Tai Po Hoi. The new town was also designed to incorporate and interact with the existing market town. The first public housing estate of Tai Po New Town: Tai Yuen Estate – was established in 1981. The population has soared to 320,000, and Tai Po New Town began to prosper following the completion of the Tolo Highway which was integrated with the older urban areas.

At present, due to the development of the new town, the place name Tai Po may refer to Tai Po New Town or the historical area centre Tai Po Market, or the Tai Po District (excluding exclave Sai Kung North) that covers the new town and Lam Tsuen Valley and another area. However, the boundary of Tai Po was not defined. In contrast, the namesake election constituency of Tai Po Market had its legally defined boundary, as well as Tai Po District; Tai Po New Town also had its officially defined boundary in urban planning regulation and law. Moreover, Hong Kong police, as well as primary and secondary schools district, had their own boundaries.

In February 2023, model and influencer Abby Choi Tin-Fung was found murdered in a village house in Lung Mei.

In November 2025, a level 5 fire started in Wang Fuk Court, Tai Po, leaving at least 168 people dead.

== Education ==
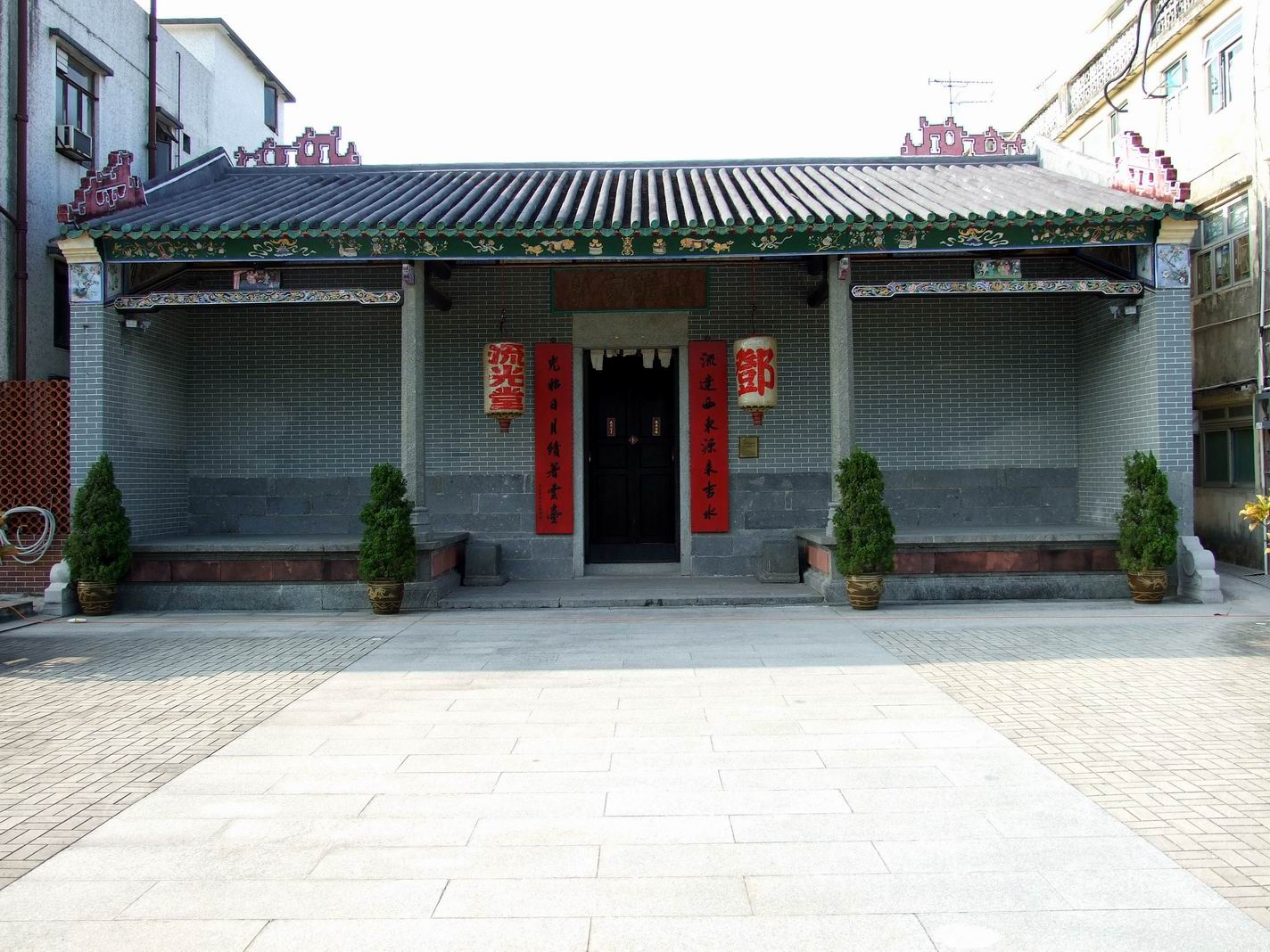
King Law Ka Shuk

In historical eras clan villages organised private study halls or sishu (私塾; si1 suk6). King Law Ka Shuk, is a declared monument of Hong Kong. It is the ancestral hall of the Tang clan Tai Po Tau branch, and historically a study hall. Village schools opened with government subsidies in the early 20th century. In the 1920s and 1930s secondary schools in the vernacular medium opened in Tai Po. Many village schools opened after World War II. Due to a decline in the birthrate, the number of school students began to decline in the 1990s, leading to the closure of many village schools.

In the present day, Tai Po is in Primary One Admission (POA) School Net 84. Within the school net are multiple aided schools (operated independently but funded with government money) and Tai Po Government Primary School (大埔官立小學).

Several international schools are also located in the district.

Hong Kong Public Libraries operates the Tai Po Public Library in the Tai Po Complex.

=== Schools ===
The Spanish Primary School, which has education in Spanish, English, and Mandarin under the National Curriculum for England, was organised by Adriana Chan. It opened in September 2017.

Mulberry House International Kindergarten is in Tai Po district, with English and Mandarin as core languages and based on the UK's Early Years Foundation Stage (EYFS).

== See also ==
- Yim Tin Tsai (Tai Po District), a village near Tai Po town
- Sha Lan Tsuen, a village near Tai Po town
