= Tai Wo =

High-rise buildings in Hong Kong

Tai Wo Estate
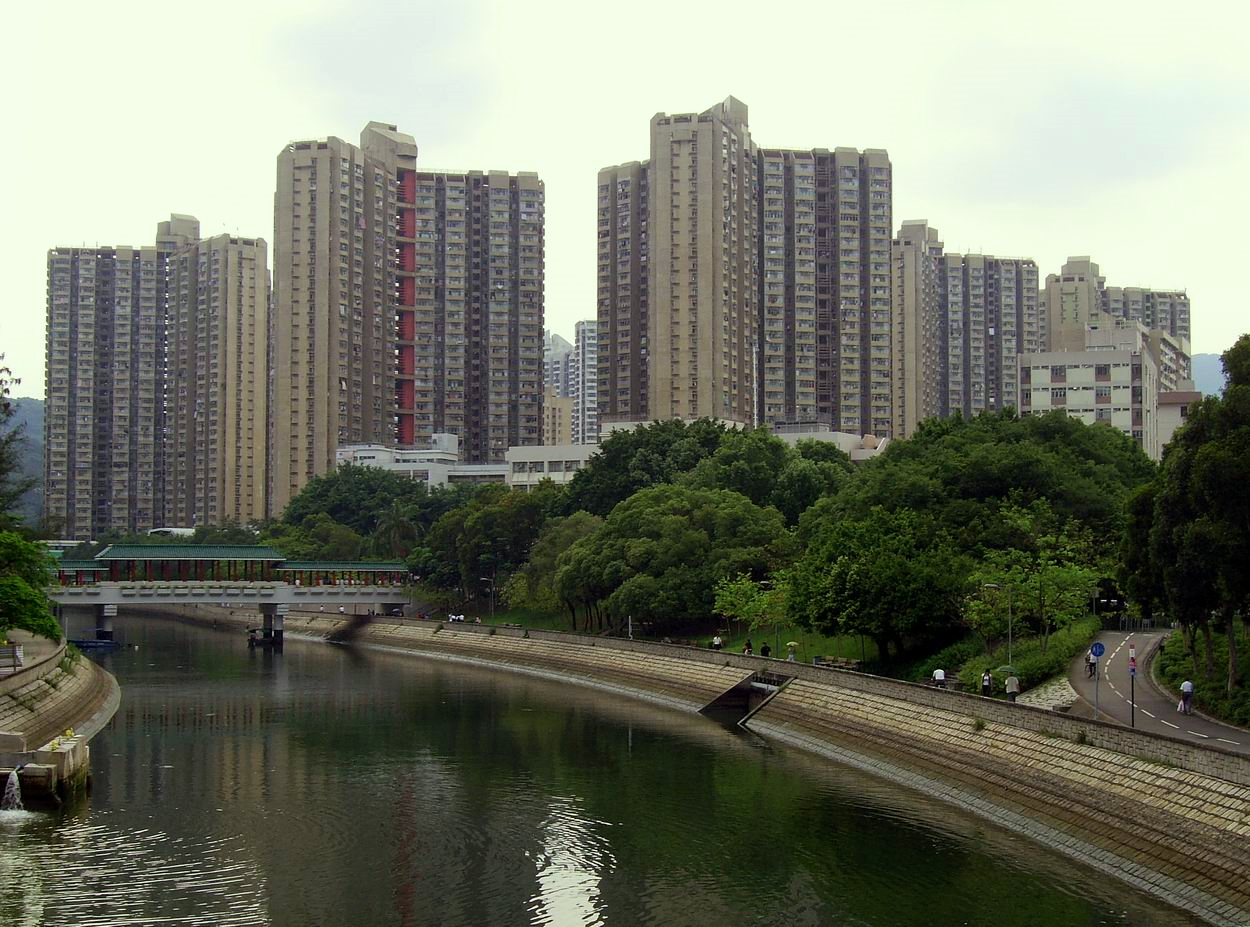
- Tai Wo Estate, with the Kwong Fuk Bridge over the Lam Tsuen River.
- Alternative names: Tai Wo; Tai Wo Plaza (shopping mall only); Tai Wo Market (wet market only)
- Etymology: name after the historic Tai Wo Market (太和市)

General information
- Type: high-rise residential buildings and multi-storey shopping mall
- Location: Tai Po District, Hong Kong
- Coordinates: 22°27′04″N 114°09′40″E
- Client: Hong Kong Housing Authority
- Owner: Housing Authority; Link REIT; private citizens

Tai Wo (Chinese: 太和) or known as Tai Wo Market are the names of several areas in the Tai Po District, in the New Territories of Hong Kong. The boundaries changed from time to time. In present time, the name "Tai Wo" mostly refers to the area surrounding the Tai Wo station of the East Rail line and the Tai Wo Estate. However, historically, Tai Wo referred to the area that currently called Tai Po Market, even though Tai Po Market was also the old name of another area, which is currently known as Tai Po Old Market. All three areas are now part of Tai Po New Town (a.k.a. Tai Po Town or just Tai Po), a satellite town (suburb) that co-jointed with the existing indigenous villages.

== History ==
=== Recent years ===
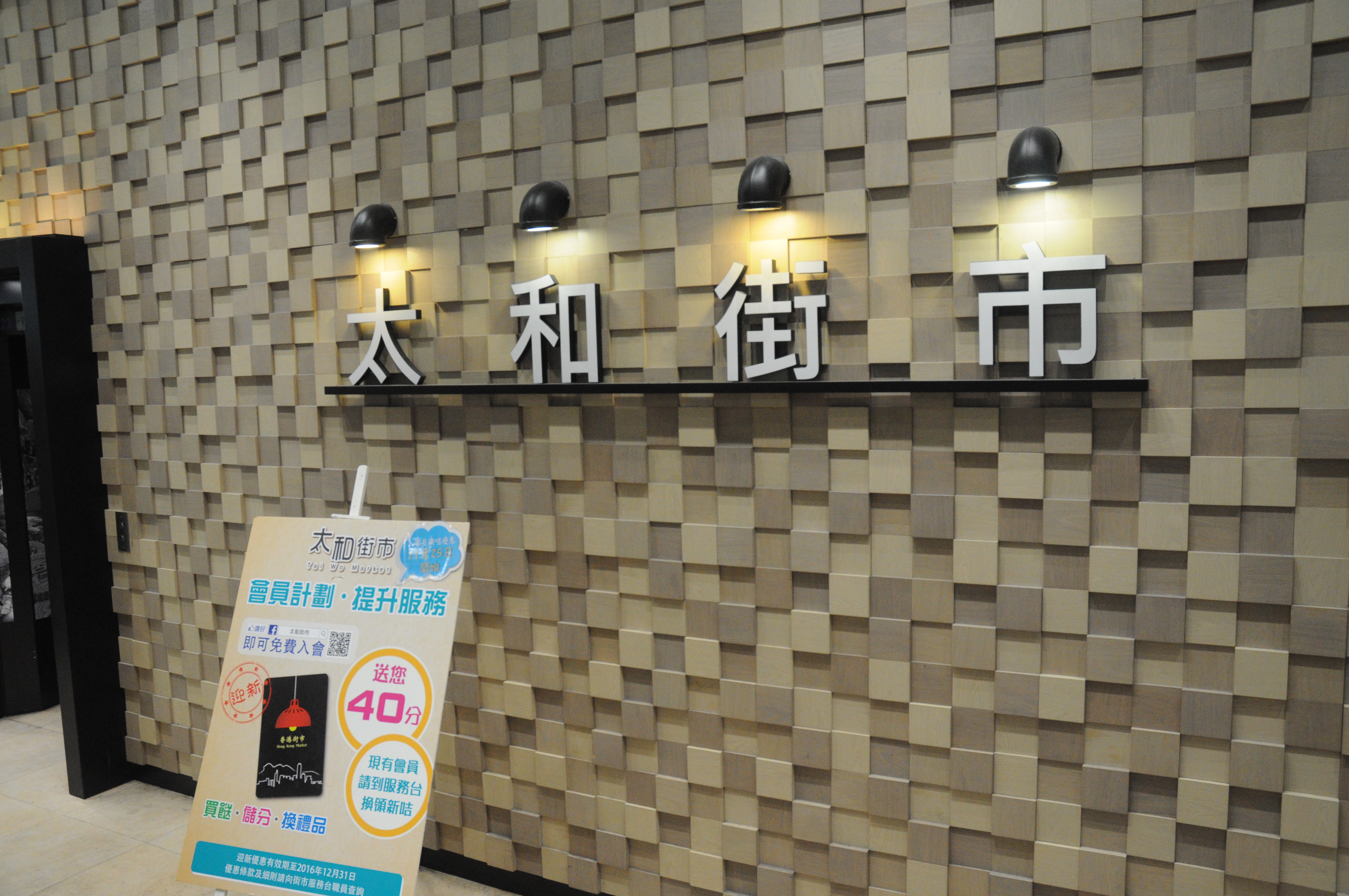
Entrance of current "Tai Wo Market" on the G/F of Tai Wo Plaza

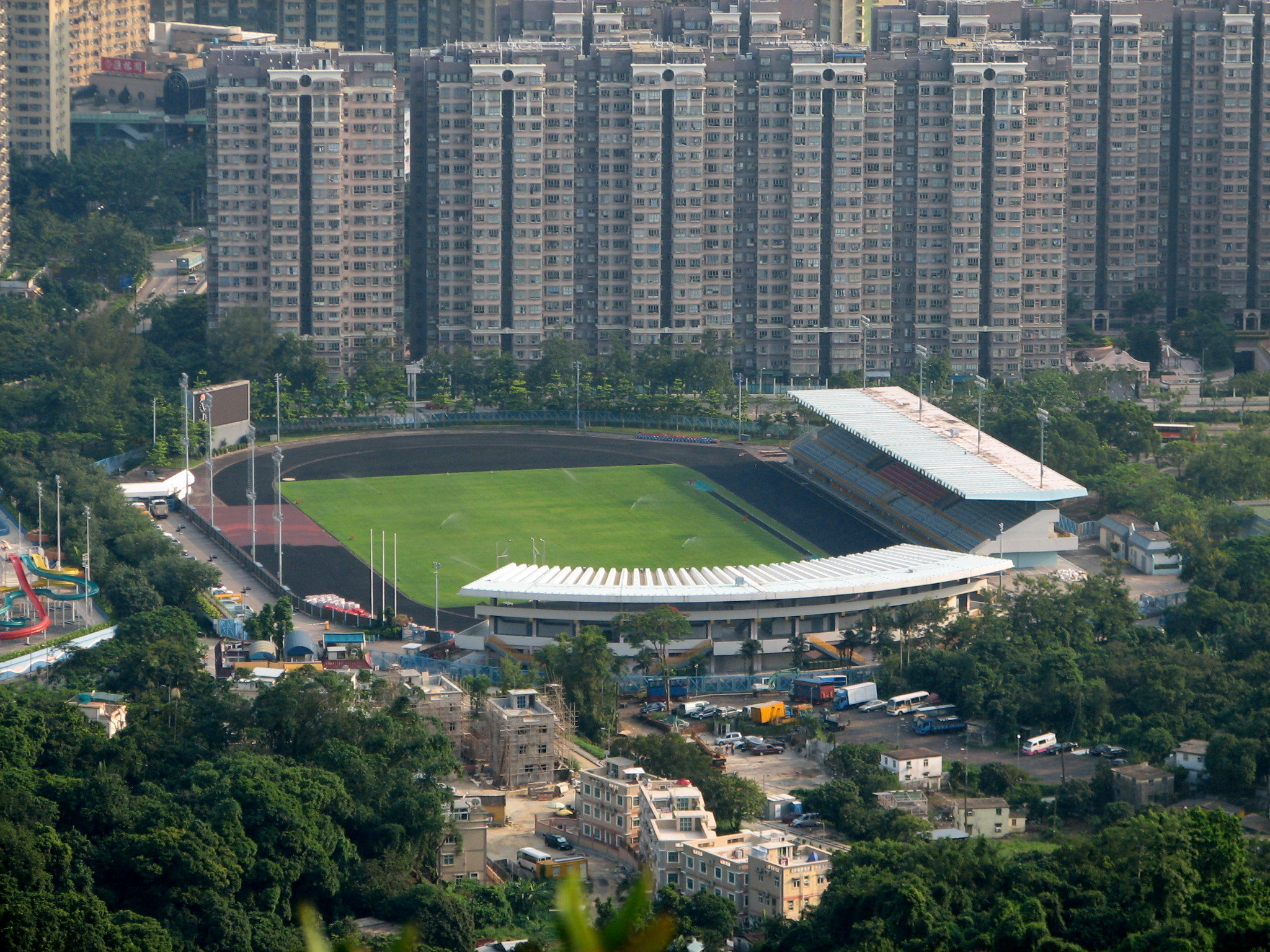
Tai Po Sports Ground (front), Serenity Park (centre) and Tai Wo Plaza (far left)

Currently, Tai Wo forms the north-western part of Tai Po Town. It has its own railway station Tai Wo station of the East Rail line and a shopping centre. Tai Wo Estate and Po Nga Court are large public housing estates in the area, which they were situated on the northern shore of the Lam Tsuen River. Their shopping centre, Tai Wo Plaza, is adjacent to the Tai Wo station. Part of the ground floor of the shopping centre, was also named "Tai Wo Market" (Chinese: 太和街市; lit. 'Tai Wo wet market') as an indoor market. Both Tai Wo Estate and Po Nga Court were the residential projects of the Hong Kong Housing Authority, which initially they were part of the portfolios of rental housing and subsidised home ownership respectively. The authority sold the shopping centre of the housing estate to Link REIT in 2005, which the real estate investment trust renamed the shopping centre from Tai Wo shopping centre (太和商場) to Tai Wo Plaza (太和廣場) in 2010.

Tai Wo Estate and Po Nga Court were completed in 1989. According to an interview of an elder of the Tang clan of Tai Po Tau, some of the land of Tai Wo Estate, were originally farmlands that owned by Tang clan of Tai Po Tau. (Or more precisely, owned the long term land lease, leasing from the government) Government bought back the farmlands for Tai Po New Town development. Ironically, Tang clan of Tai Po Tau, was one of the operators of the original Tai Po Market, now the residential area Tai Po Old Market, while Tai Wo was named after the historic Tai Wo Market, which now known as Tai Po Market.

The area of Tai Wo Estate, was planned as an industrial area. However, the plan was scrapped in 1983.

=== Connection of the historic Tai Wo Market and current Tai Po Market ===
Historically, "Tai Wo" was the name of the current outdoor market area Fu Shin Street (富善街), which was situated on the southern shore of the Lam Tsuen River. It was one of the market town of Tai Po and surrounding villages. Fu Shin Street, at that time known as Tai Wo Market (太和市 transliteration Tai Wo Shi) or Tai Po New Market (大埔新墟) was developed since 1892 by the Tai Po Tsat Yeuk (七約; 'Seven Alliance'). Which Tsat Yeuk was an inter-village alliance, none of them were from Tang clan. The formation of a new market town, was intended to break the monopoly of the [old] Tai Po Market (大埔墟, now Tai Po Old Market) formed by the Tang clans of Lung Yeuk Tau (龍躍頭鄧氏) and Tai Po Tau (大埔頭鄧氏). The Tai Po Old Market (大埔舊墟, transliteration Tai Po Kau Hui) was located on the Northern shore of the Lam Tsuen River. In early Qing dynasty (mid-17th century), Tai Po Old Market was known as Tai Po Tau Hui (大步頭墟).

Tsat Yeuk also built Kwong Fuk Bridge which connects the two market towns, as well as Tai Po's Man Mo Temple which located in the centre of Fu Shin Street.

To add more confusion to the name, government also runs an indoor wet market Tai Po Hui Market (大埔墟街市) in Tai Po Complex, while its former location (大埔墟臨時街市), was redeveloped into a public housing estate Po Heung Estate, where they are near to the Fu Shin Street. All three locations were belongs to "Tai Po Market" District Council Election Constituency of 2015 Hong Kong local elections.

The headquarters of Tai Po Rural Committee of Heung Yee Kuk, was located in the former school building of the Sung Tak primary school (not to be confused with Sung Tak Wong Kin Sheung Memorial School), which is located at one end of Fu Shin Street. The former headquarters was redeveloped into aforementioned Po Heung Estate. Tai Po Rural Committee supervised some of the matter of the villages of indigenous inhabitants of Tai Po.

Tai Wo Shi (Fu Shin Street) was served by [old] Tai Po Market railway station. The accessibility of Tai Wo Shi had made the area as one of the important market town of the New Territories. However, the railway station was closed in 1983 and was replaced by the current Tai Po Market station and Tai Wo station on different locations.

To sum up, despite historically known as Tai Wo, area around Fu Shin Street has known as Tai Po Market, and became the town centre of Tai Po, housing various government buildings.

=== Other namesake ===
Lastly, Tai Po Tai Wo Road is a public road that start from an area next to the Tai Wo Estate, and then connects to area such as Tai Po Centre, a privately owned high rise commercial-residential complex, as well as Tai Po Police Station (not to be confused with Old Tai Po Police Station), and ends on the western boundary of Tai Po Waterfront Park. Most part of the road are not part of the historic Tai Wo Market, nor the current Tai Wo Estate.

== In election boundaries ==
Current map of the election constituencies of the Tai Po District. Tai Po Hui is marked as P01, Old Market & Serenity is marked as P16, Tai Woo is marked as P15 and Po Nga was marked as P14

In 2015 Hong Kong local elections, the name of the District Council Election Constituency that Fu Shin Street (the historic Tai Wo Market) was located, was called "Tai Po Hui" (大埔墟; 'Tai Po Market'), while the large part of Tai Wo Estate was the only residential area of the election constituency "Tai Wo"; Po Nga Court and other part of Tai Wo Estate were the only residential area of the election constituency "Po Nga". North of "Tai Wo" constituency, was the "Old Market & Serenity" constituency (Chinese: 舊墟及太湖, lit. '[The] old market and Serenity Park'), where Tai Po Old Market was located. As of 2007, Tai Po Old Market is a pure residential area, while Serenity Park is another privately owned residential complex.

The current Tai Po Market station, was located on the boundary between "Tai Po Hui" constituency and "San Fu" (新富) constituency; the bus terminus of the station, which was located on the ground floor and underground level of a commercial-residential complex, Uptown Plaza (新達廣場), was entirely inside "San Fu" constituency.

Tai Wo station was located on the boundary between constituencies "Tai Wo" and "Po Nga".

However, the proposed change for the District Council Election Constituencies of 2019 Hong Kong local elections, had enlarged the constituency "Po Nga", which cover more than Po Nga Court and part of the Tai Wo Estate. It was also accused of gerrymandering.

In 1989, Tai Wo Estate did not have their own election constituency.

== See also ==
- Tai Po Sports Ground, located in the nearby Tai Po Tau, next to Serenity Park.
