= Tai Po Market =

Area of Tai Po New Town in Hong Kong

Tai Po Market or Tai Po Hui (Chinese: 大埔墟) is the name of an area within the modern-day Tai Po New Town in the Tai Po District, in the New Territories, Hong Kong. However, its exact location changed from time to time. It is considered as the town centre of the area known as Tai Po. The area was first established as a market town, at the location of the modern-day residential and commercial area Tai Po Old Market, or Tai Po Kau Hui (大埔舊墟), which is near the present-day area Tai Wo (Tai Wo Estate). Later on, a new market, Tai Wo Shi (太和市) was established across the river and when the Kowloon-Canton Railway British Section was opened in 1910, it was the site of a flag station named Tai Po Market. However, all three areas do not overlap, and are divided by Lam Tsuen River or Tai Po Tai Wo Road. Tai Po Market, Tai Po Old Market and Tai Wo Estate are all within modern day Tai Po New Town (Tai Po Town).

== History ==
Current map of the election constituencies of the Tai Po District. Tai Po Hui is marked as P01, Old Market & Serenity is marked as P16

The first Tai Po Hui (Chinese: 大埔墟; Jyutping: daai6 bou3 heoi1; Cantonese Yale: daaih bou hēui; lit. 'Tai Po Market') was established by the Tang clan Tai Po Tau branch in the Qing dynasty. In Kangxi Year edition of Xin'an Xianzhi (Gazetteer of the Xin'an County (or San-On County in the Cantonese language)), the market town was also known as Tai Po Tau Hui (大步頭墟; daai6 bou6 tau4 heoi1; daaih bouh tàuh hēui; 'Tai Po Tau Market'). In Jiaqing Year edition of the book, the place was known as Tai Po Hui (大步墟; daai6 bou6 heoi1; daaih bouh hēui; 'Tai Po Market'). The market town was located in the northern shore of the Lam Tsuen river mouth. However, non-Tang villages formed their own alliance Tai Po Tsat Yeuk, and established Tai Wo Shi (literally Tai Wo Market) in the south shore of the river. The alliance also built a bridge to connect the two market towns in 1896. Before the establishment of Tai Wo Shi, non-Tang villages were forbidden to establish shops in Tang's Tai Po Hui by the Qing government. It was said Tai Po Hui was one of the three major market towns of Hong Kong [sic] (Note: Modern Hong Kong did not exist until 1842, when the Hong Kong Island was ceded to the British Empire. Tai Po was not part of modern Hong Kong until 1898, when the New Territories was leased to the British Empire as the extension of the colony of Hong Kong. Tai Po was part of Qing's Xin'an County (Bao'an County) until 1898. Qing dynasty lasted from 1644 to 1912. Geographically, Tai Po is part of the New Territories of Hong Kong, but not part of the Hong Kong Island. Moreover, 蕭國健 (Anthony Kwok-kin Siu) did not stated the names of the two other market towns in his three major market towns theory. Similar claim was also stated by David Faure of the CUHK. In his book, Faure stated that Yuen Long and Shenzhen (which had never been part of HK) were probably the two major market towns in Qing dynasty for the areas that covers the modern-day New Territories and the surrounding. He also stated Tai Po was the principal market town for the eastern New Territories at that time.) in the early Qing dynasty.

The area around the two Tai Po market towns, as well as other minor market towns, were leased to the British Empire in 1898. The region is now known as the New Territories. The colonial government built the Tai Po Market railway station next to the Tai Wo Shi in 1913. The District Office of the colonial Hong Kong government, also within the proximity of both new and old Tai Po Hui. In modern-day, the area around Fu Shin Street, the heart of the former Tai Wo Shi, was known as just Tai Po Hui, while the first market town of Tai Po (Tang's Tai Po Hui), was known as Tai Po Kau Hui (Tai Po Old Market) instead.

However, the usage of Tai Po Hui / Tai Po Market also extended to area that covered that modern-day electoral constituency Tai Po Hui, which included the 1960s built The Lane-Square in Tai Po, (or known as the "Four Lanes of Tai Po Market": Kwong Fuk Lane, Tai Wing Lane, Tai Kwong Lane and Tai Ming Lane), as well as Luk Heung San Tsuen. The railway station, also moved to the current site, east of the former place in the 1980s.

To add more confusion to the name, government also opened an indoor wet market, the Tai Po Hui Market and Cooked Food Centre (大埔墟街市及熟食中心), in Tai Po Complex in 2004, while its former location, was redeveloped into a public housing estate Po Heung Estate, where they are near to the Fu Shin Street. The two locations belong to the aforementioned Tai Po Hui constituency.

=== Tai Po Market (Tai Po Hui, formerly Tai Wo Shi) ===
Fu Shin Street
- Tai Po Hui (大埔墟)
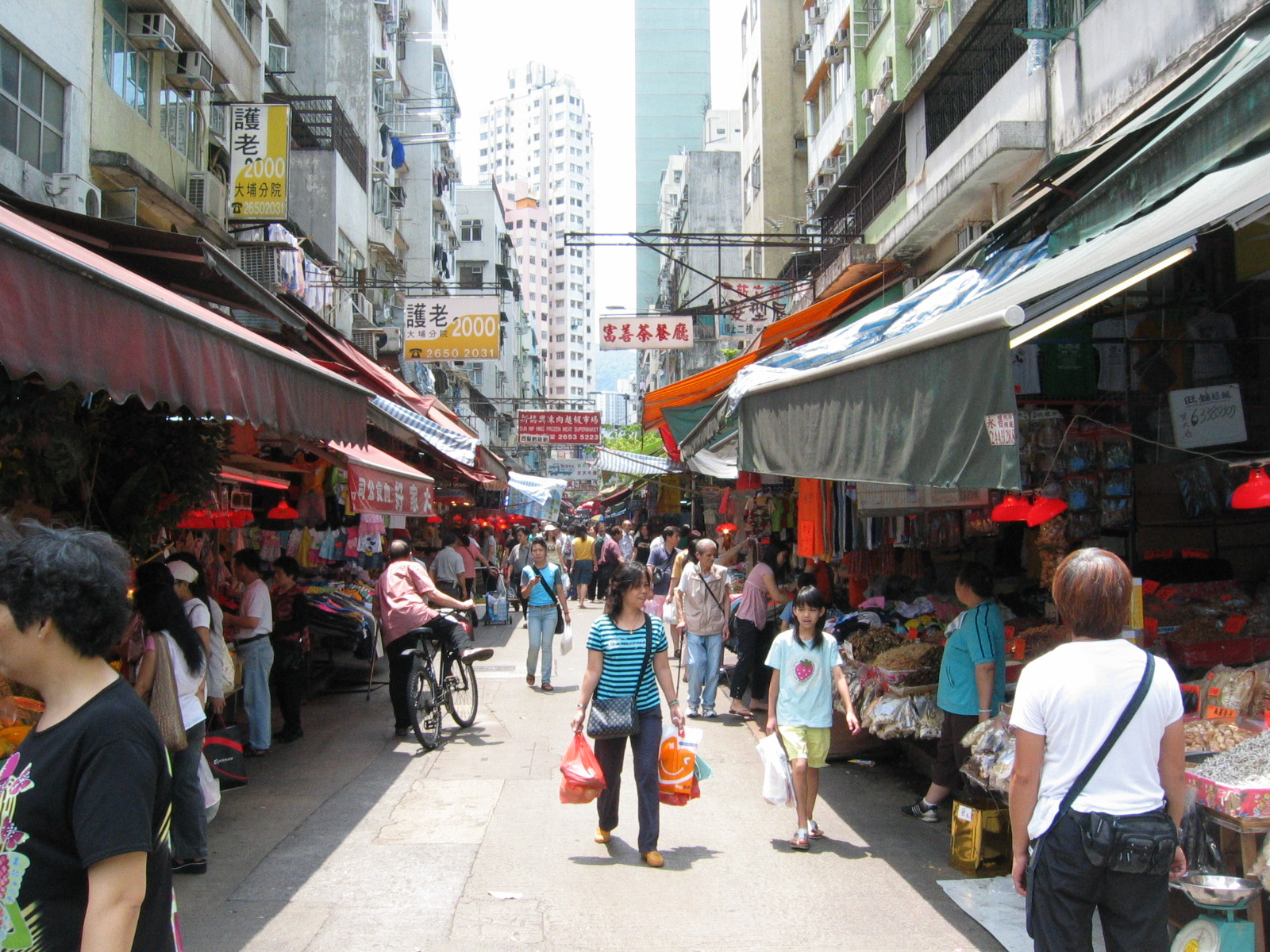
- Fu Shin Street
- Interactive map of Fu Shin Street
- Native name: 富善街 (Chinese)
- Former name: Tai Wo Shi (太和市)
- Type: market town and walking street
- Location: Tai Po Town, Tai Po District, Hong Kong
- Coordinates: 22°26′53″N 114°9′53.5″E

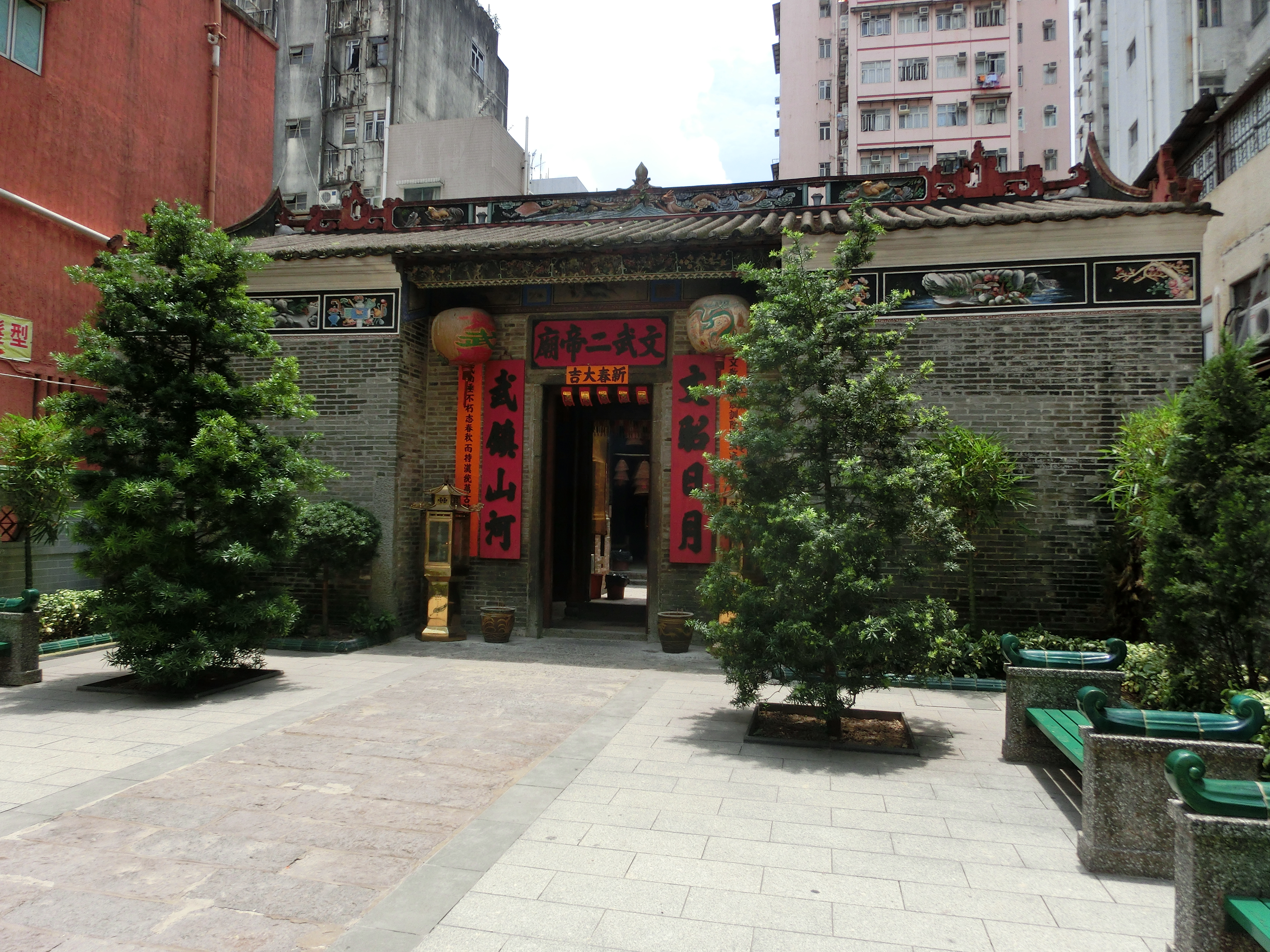
Man Mo Temple in Fu Shin Street

Tai Wo Shi (Tai Wo Market), at modern day Fu Shin Street, was established in 1892. The market town was later known as Tai Po Hui (Tai Po Market). The street currently consisted of post-Qing dynasty buildings, except a well and a Man Mo Temple. The temple, at the heart of the Fu Shin Street, is a declared monument of Hong Kong. The former railway station of the market town, was converted into Hong Kong Railway Museum in the 1980s.

The market town Tai Wo Shi displaced the old Tai Po market town (Tang's Tai Po Hui) as the rural town centre of the area, which also took the ownership of the name Tai Po Hui (Tai Po Market). Some author credited the displacement was due to the accessibility of the new market. The New Territories circular road passes through Tai Wo Shi as Kwong Fuk Road, which connects to Tai Po Road in the south and Lam Kam Road in the north in the past, was constructed in the colonial area of the New Territories.

As the main circular road was intended to facilitate the movement of troops, it avoided the centres of population. Of course, this new facility was just the thing to stimulate development.…At Castle Peak, the road was on the opposite side of the river estuary from the town of Tuen Mun, so a San Hui, or New Market, was built alongside the road. Similarly at Tai Po, the Old Market was found to be on the wrong side of the river…

— Denis Bray, Hong Kong Metamorphosis (2001)

Tai Po was one of the market towns that was selected to be expanded into a satellite town (new town) in 1972.

=== Tai Po Old Market (Tai Po Kau Hui) ===
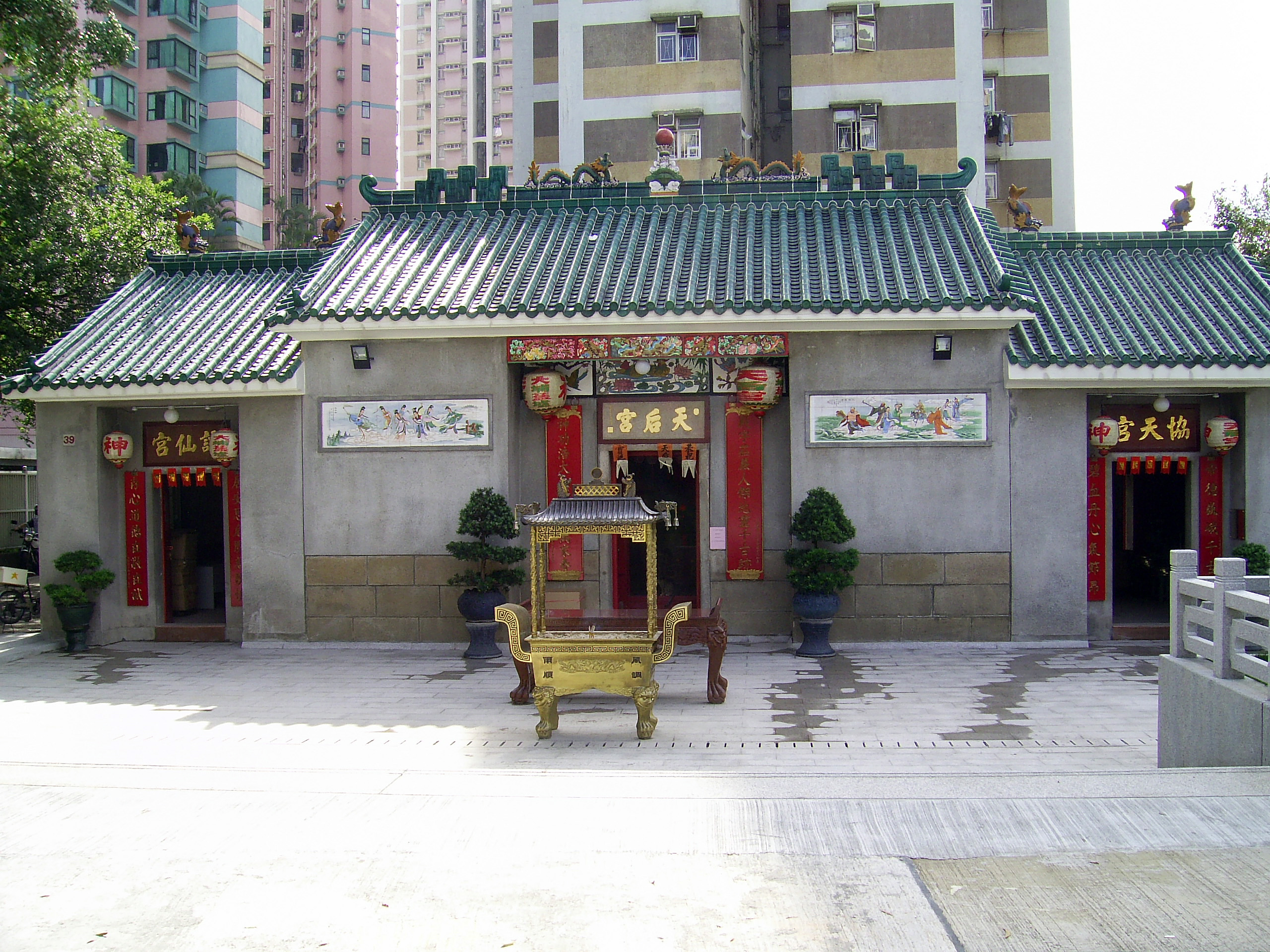
Tin Hau Temple, Tai Po Old Market

Tai Po Old Market (Tai Po Kau Hui), in Xin'an Xianzhi, was also listed as villages (as Tai Po Hui) along with Tai Po Tau. The former market town, which was established in 1672, was unable to observe in the modern day Tai Po Old Market. A Tin Hau Temple existed in the modern day Tai Po Old Market. The temple was established by the Tang clan Tai Po Tau branch before 1691. It was said an ancestral temple, the Temple of the Filial Son (鄧孝子祠) was demolished in the 1970s.

== Administration ==
Tai Po Hui and Tai Po Kau Hui are recognized villages under the New Territories Small House Policy.

== See also ==
- Shenzhen (market town)
- Sha Tau Kok, another market town
- Luen Wo Hui, another market town
- Shek Wu Hui, another market town
- Tuen Mun Kau Hui
- Tuen Mun San Hui
- Yuen Long Kau Hui
- Sha Tin Market
- List of buildings, sites, and areas in Hong Kong
