= Tai Wo station =

MTR station in the New Territories, Hong Kong

Tai Wo 太和
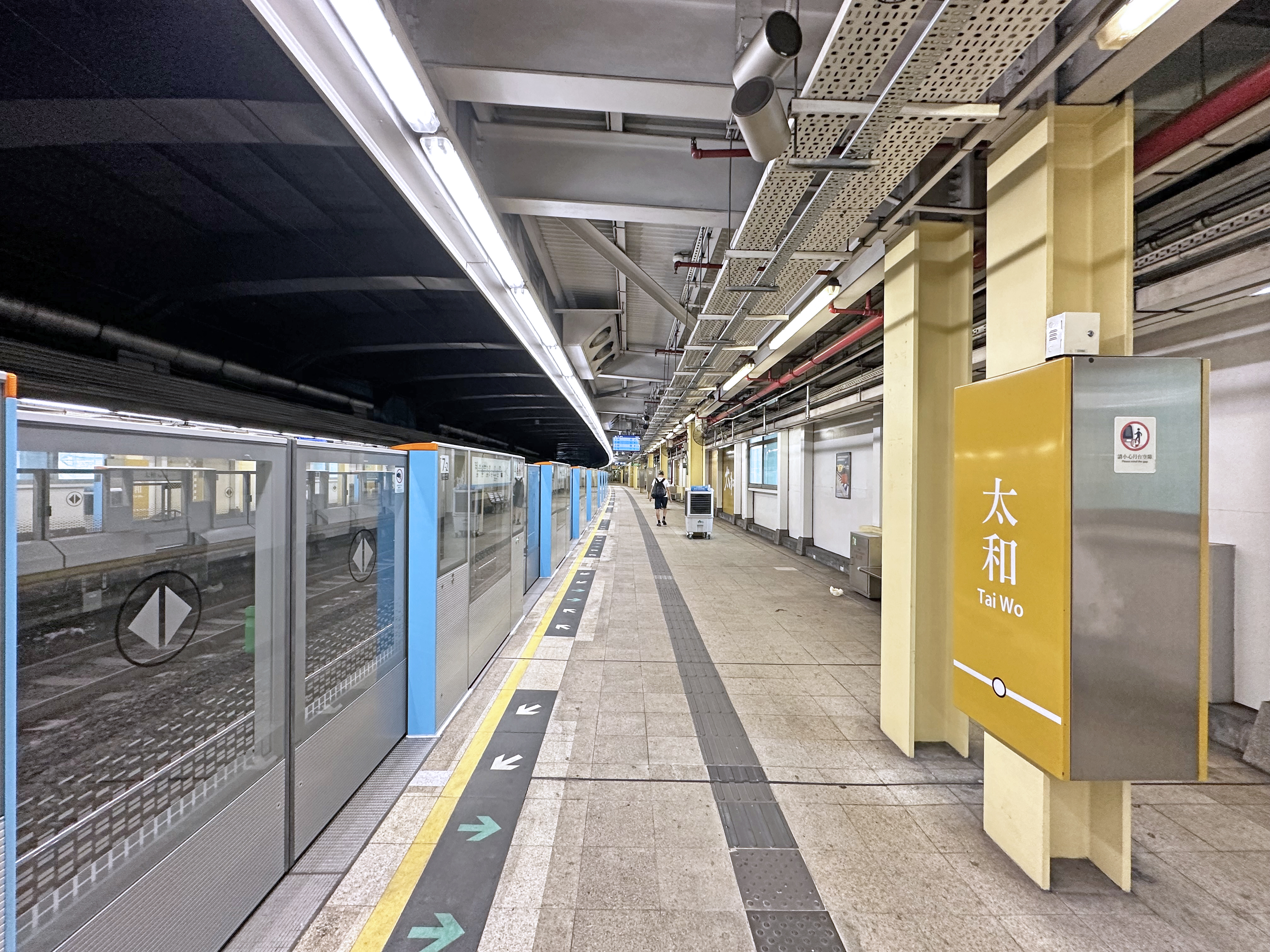
- Platform 2 of Tai Wo station

Chinese name
- Chinese: 太和
- Jyutping: taai^{3} wo^{4}
- Hanyu Pinyin: Tàihé
Transcriptions
Standard Mandarin
- Hanyu Pinyin: Tàihé
Yue: Cantonese
- Yale Romanization: Taaiwò
- IPA: [tʰaj˧wɔ˩]
- Jyutping: taai^{3} wo^{4}

General information
- Location: Po Nga Road, Tai Wo; Tai Po District, Hong Kong
- Coordinates: 22°27′04″N 114°09′40″E
- System: MTR rapid transit station
- Owner: KCR Corporation
- Operator: MTR Corporation
- Line: East Rail line
- Platforms: 2 side platforms
- Tracks: 2
- Connections: Bus, minibus

Construction
- Structure type: on embankment
- Accessible: Yes

Other information
- Station code: TWO

History
- Opened: 9 May 1989; 37 years ago

Services
Preceding station	MTR	Following station
Tai Po Market towards Admiralty	East Rail line	Fanling towards Lo Wu or Lok Ma Chau
Track layout
Location
- Location within MTR

Tai Wo (Chinese: 太和; Jyutping: taai^{3} wo^{4}; Cantonese Yale: Taaiwò; pronounced: [tʰaj˧wɔ˩]) is an MTR station in the western part of Tai Po New Town, in New Territories, Hong Kong. The station is located on the East Rail line, between Fanling and Tai Po Market stations. Its livery is ochre.

== History ==
Construction of the station, situated within the eponymous Tai Wo Estate, began in August 1986. It opened on 9 May 1989 as an intermediate station of the East Rail line, then known as the Kowloon–Canton Railway, upon the completion of the estate.

== Layout ==
The Tai Wo station premises are sandwiched between the two wings of Tai Wo Plaza, the shopping mall of Tai Wo Estate. Both of the exits at the station connect to Tai Wo Plaza, and passengers must pass through the mall in order to enter or exit the station.

G	Footbridge	Exit B, customer service centre, passageway between platforms 1 and 2
L2
L2	Concourse	Exit A, customer service centre, washrooms, automatic teller machines
L2	Side platform
L2	Platform 1	East Rail line towards Lo Wu or Lok Ma Chau (Fanling) →
L2	Platform 2	← East Rail line towards Admiralty (Tai Po Market)
L2	Side platform

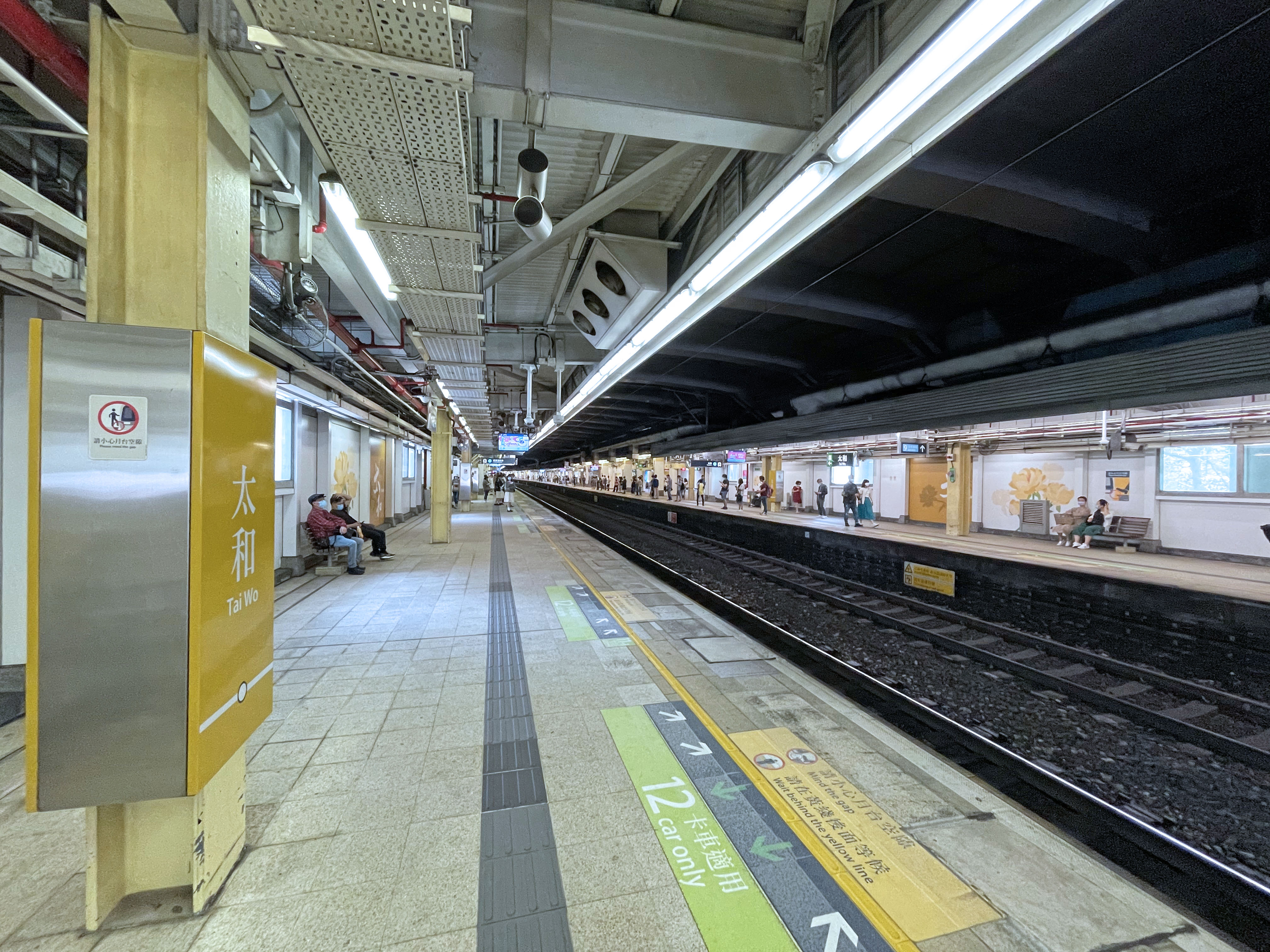
Tai Wo Station Platforms 1(April 2021)

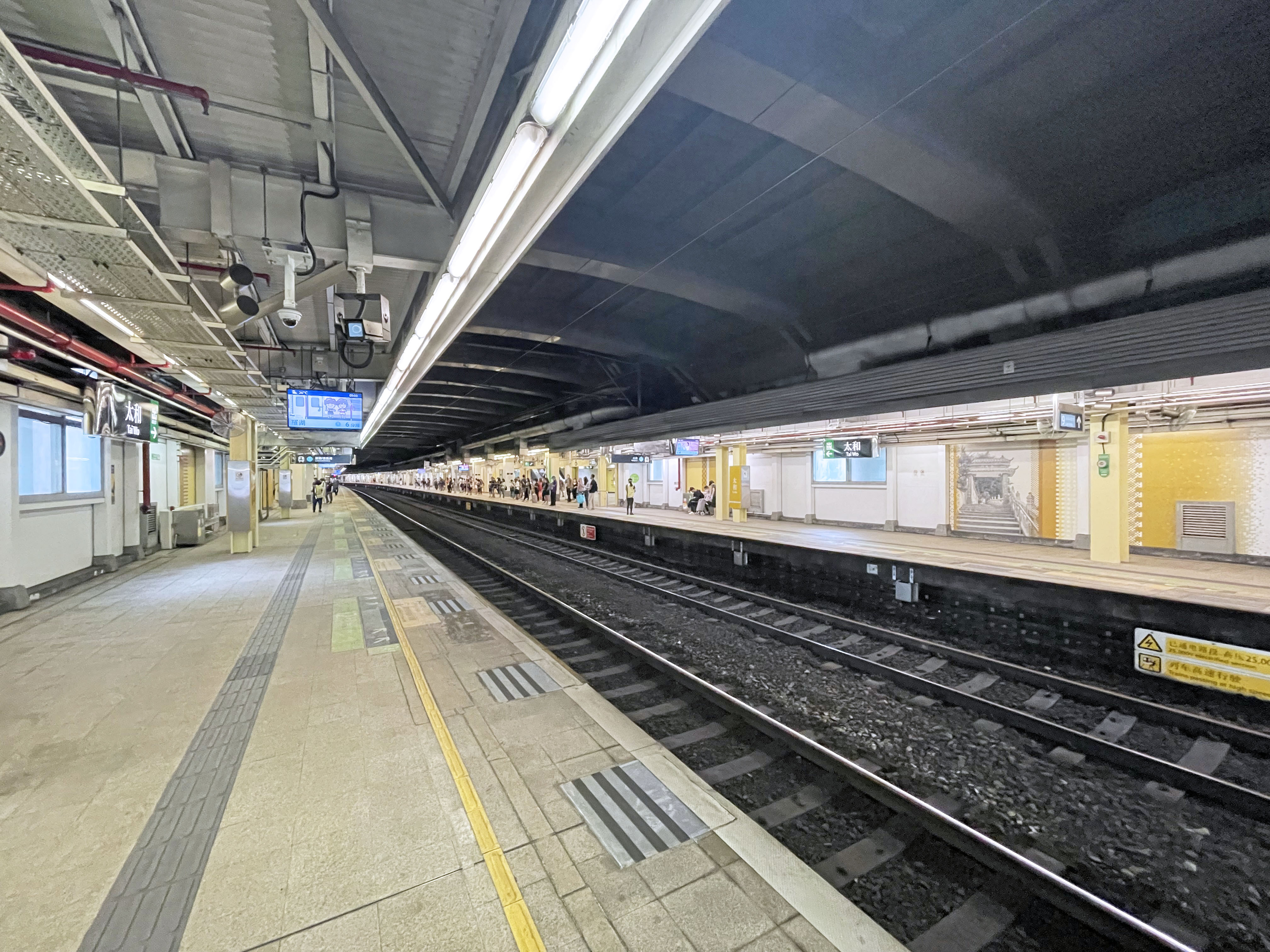
Tai Wo Station Platforms 1(April 2022)

== Entrances/exits ==
- A: Hong Kong Railway Museum, Tai Wo Plaza, transport interchange
- B: Tai Wo Estate
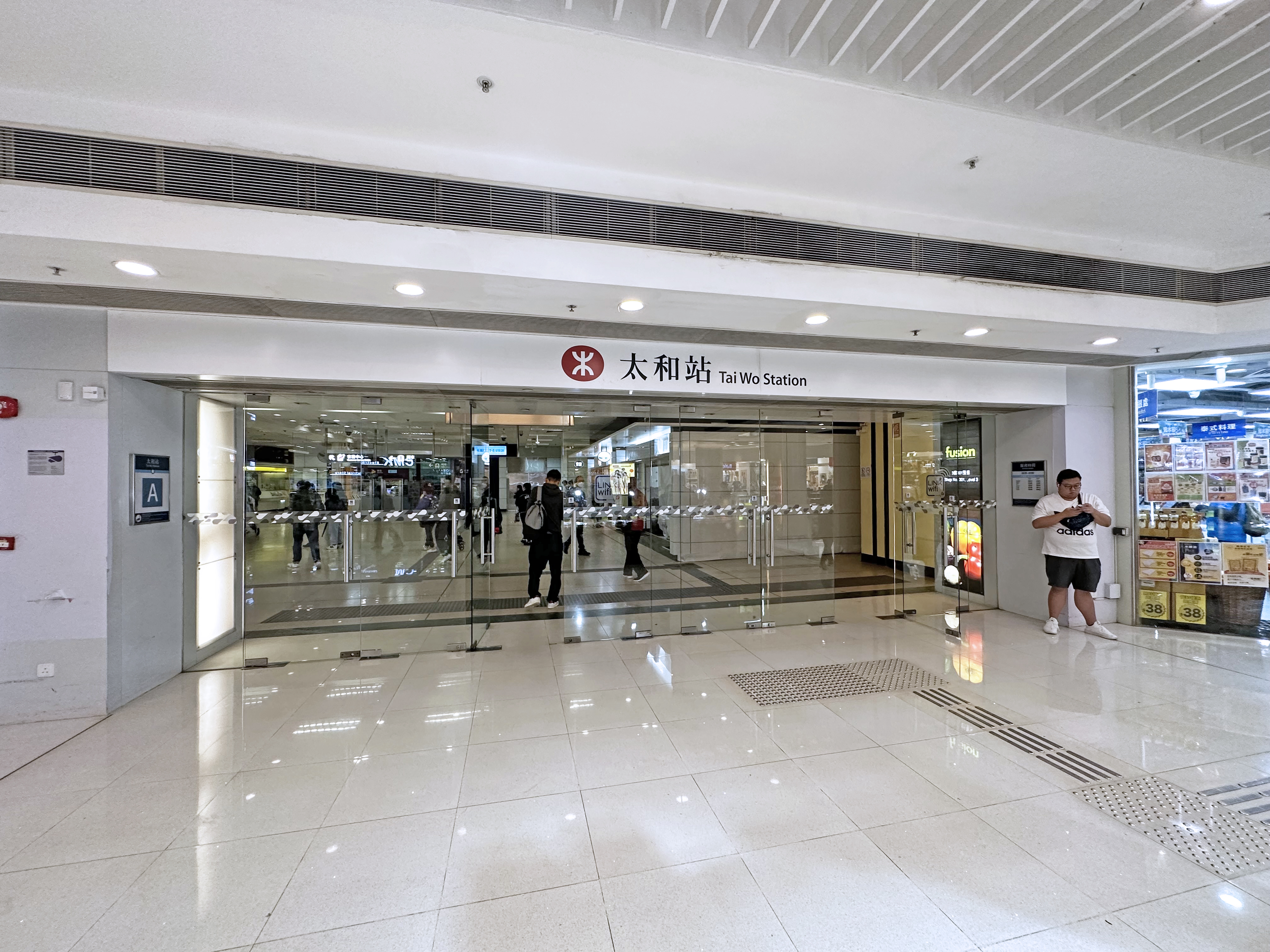
Exit A

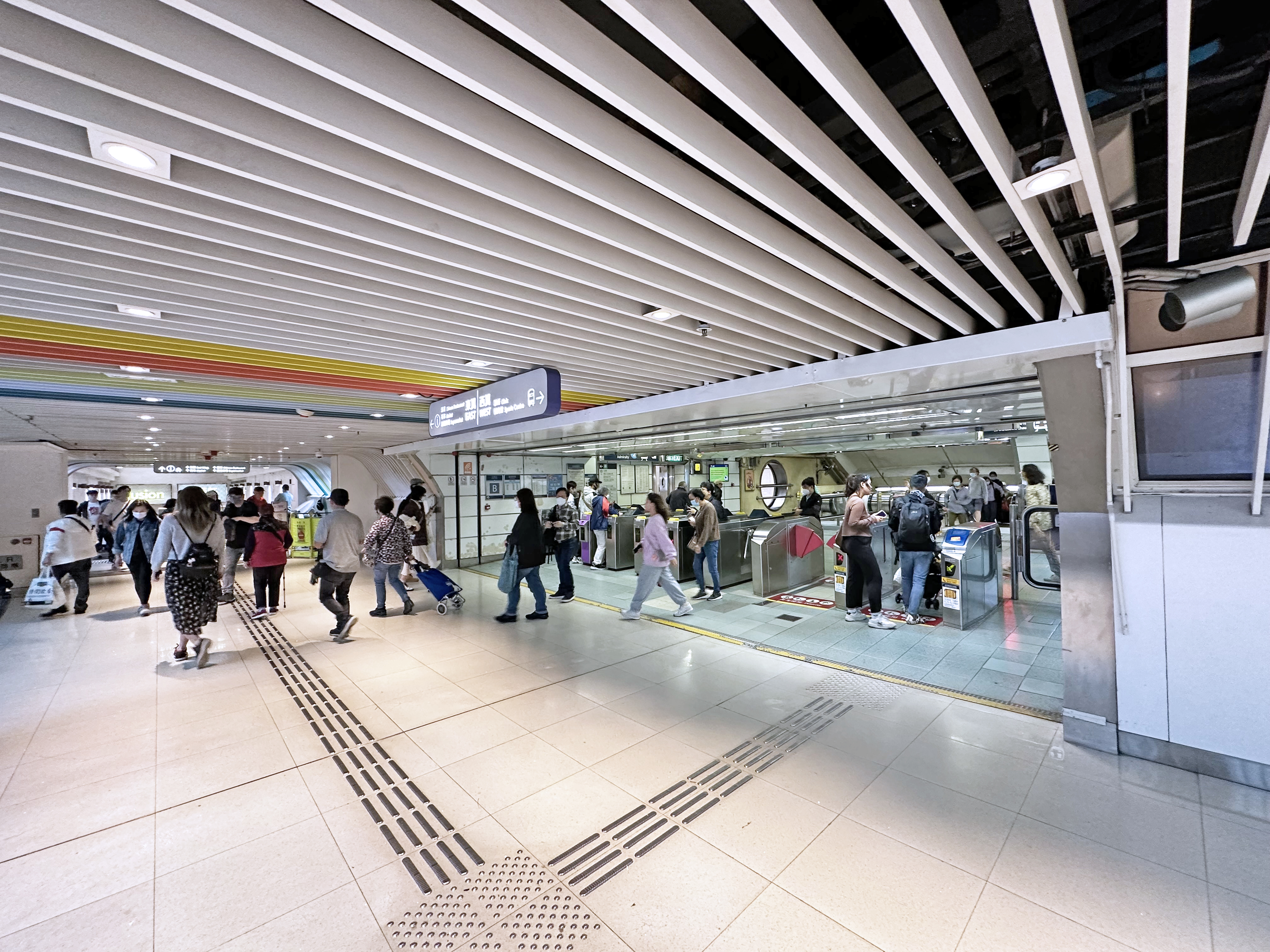
Exit B

=== Connections ===
Below Tai Wo station is a transport interchange, where bus and minibus routes connecting the neighbouring rural areas of Lam Tsuen, Tai Hang and Kau Lung Hang are available. This renders Tai Wo the gateway to the western rural part of Tai Po District.
