= Old Market & Serenity (constituency) =

- Elected constituency for the Tai Po District Council
- Boundary of Old Market & Serenity in Tai Po District
- District: Tai Po
- Legislative Council constituency: New Territories North East
- Population: 17,381 (2019)
- Electorate: 9,996 (2019)

Current constituency
- Created: 1994
- Number of members: One
- Member: Lau Yung-wai (Independent)

Old Market & Serenity is one of the 19 constituencies in the Tai Po District in Hong Kong.

The constituency returns one district councillor to the Tai Po District Council, with an election every four years. The seat has been currently held by Lau Yung-wai.

Old Market & Serenity constituency is loosely based on private apartments in Tai Po Old Market and Serenity Park with estimated population of 15,455.

== Councillors represented ==
Election	Member	Party
1994	Irene Luk Ngai-ling	Liberal
1999	Wong Chun-wai	Democratic
2010	Wong Chun-wai	Neo Democrats
2011	Cheung Kwok-wai	DAB
2015	Lau Yung-wai	Independent democrat

== Election results ==
=== 2010s ===
Tai Po District Council Election, 2019: Old Market & Serenity
Party	Candidate	Votes	%	±%
Ind. democrat	Lau Yung-wai	5,383	69.97	+13.88
NPP (Civil Force)	Lau Man-kit	2,310	30.03	
Majority		3,073	39.94	
Turnout		7,719	77.26	
Ind. democrat hold		Swing		

Tai Po District Council Election, 2015: Old Market & Serenity
Party	Candidate	Votes	%	±%
Independent	Lau Yung-wai	2,170	56.09	
DAB	Cheung Kwok-wai	1,699	43.91	−9.29
Majority		471	12.17	
Turnout		3,869	51.70	+17.6
Independent gain from DAB		Swing		
