= Tai Po Tsat Yeuk =

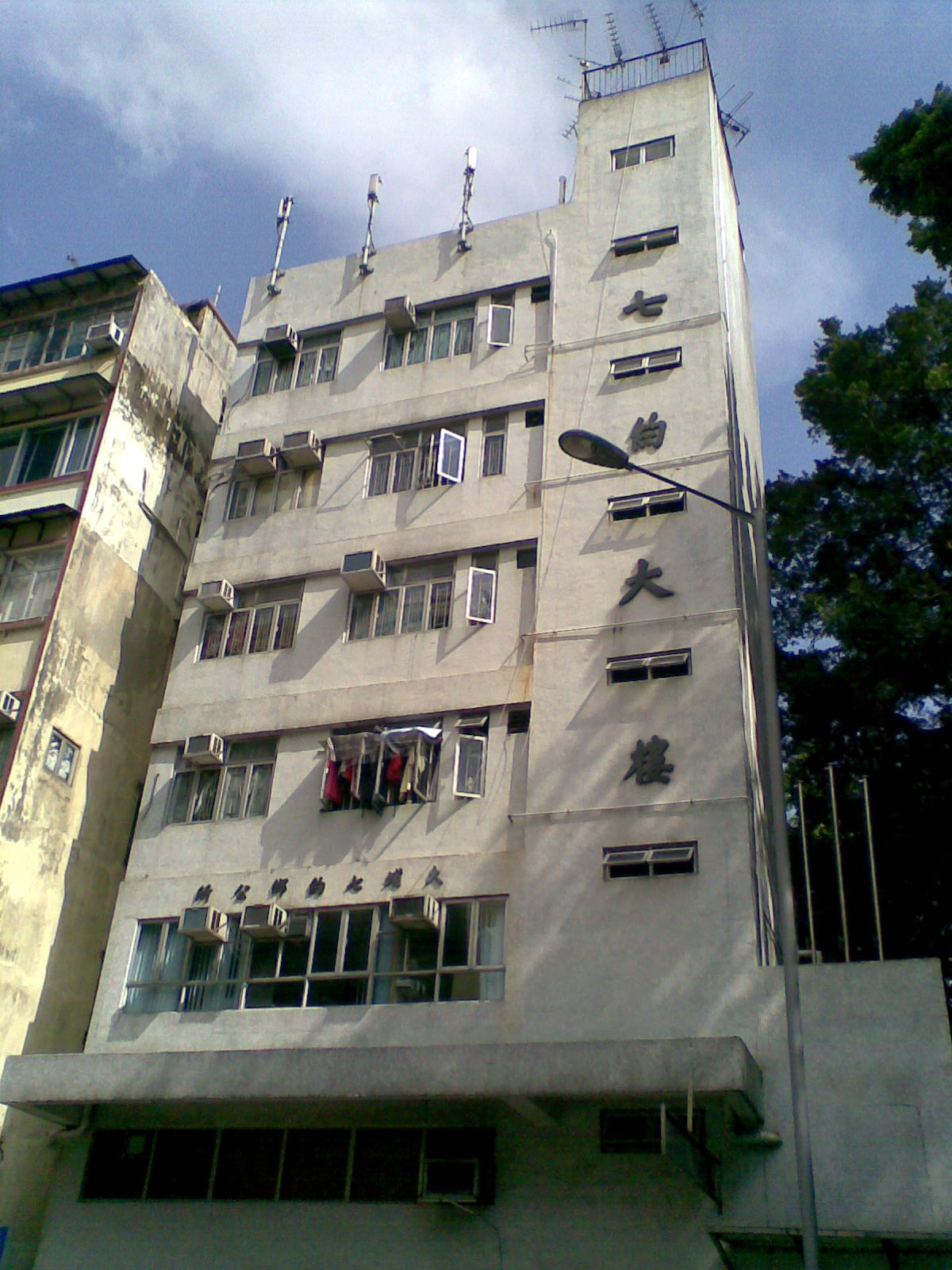
Tai Po Tsat Yeuk Rural Committee building in 2007.

Tai Po Tsat Yeuk (Chinese: 大埔七約; lit. 'Tai Po Seven Alliances') was an inter-village alliance (約, yeuk) in today's Hong Kong. It collectively comprised 64 villages.

== History ==
The alliance established Tai Wo Market (太和市) in 1892 in order to break the monopoly of the old Tai Po Market (大埔墟) founded by the Tang Clan of Lung Yeuk Tau (龍躍頭鄧氏).

== Alliance ==
The seven constituents of the alliance were:

- Tai Hang Yeuk (泰亨約)
- Lam Tsuen Yeuk (林村約)
- Hop Wo Yeuk (翕和約)
- Jap Wo Yeuk (集和約)
- Ting Kok Yeuk (汀角約)
- Cheung Shue Yeuk (樟樹灘約)
- Fanling Yeuk (粉嶺約)

== See also ==
- Kau Yeuk (Sha Tin)
