= Po Heung Estate =

Public housing estate in Tai Po, Hong Kong

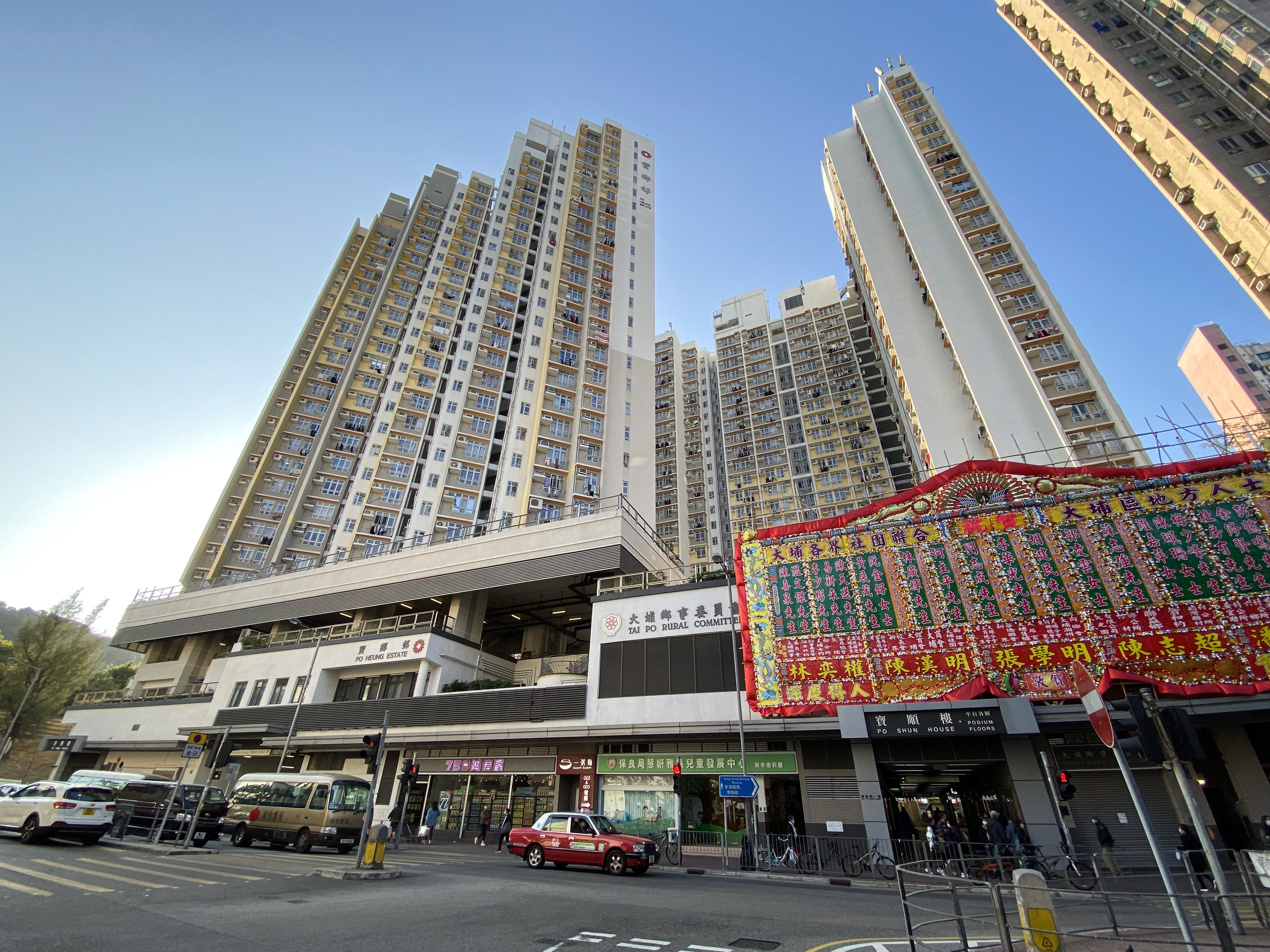
- Po Heung Estate
- Interactive map of Po Heung Estate

General information
- Location: 1 Po Heung Street, Tai Po; New Territories, Hong Kong
- Coordinates: 22.4471028°N 114.1652569°E
- Status: Completed
- Category: Public rental housing
- No. of blocks: 2
- No. of units: 483

Construction
- Constructed: 2016; 10 years ago
- Authority: Hong Kong Housing Authority

Po Heung Estate (Chinese: 寶鄉邨) is a public housing estate in Po Heung Street, Tai Po, New Territories, Hong Kong near Tai Po Market, Hong Kong Railway Museum and Tai Po Hui Sports Centre. Formerly the office of Tai Po Rural Committee and Tai Po Temporary Market, the estate consists of two residential blocks completed in 2016.

== Houses ==
Name	Chinese name	Building type	Completed
Po Hing House	寶興樓	Non-standard	2016
Po Shun House	寶順樓	Non-standard	2016

== Politics ==
Po Heung Estate is located in Tai Po Hui constituency of the Tai Po District Council. It was formerly represented by Lam Ming-yat, who was elected in the 2019 elections until May 2021.

== See also ==
- Public housing estates in Tai Po
