= Tai Wo Estate =

Public housing estate in Tai Po, Hong Kong

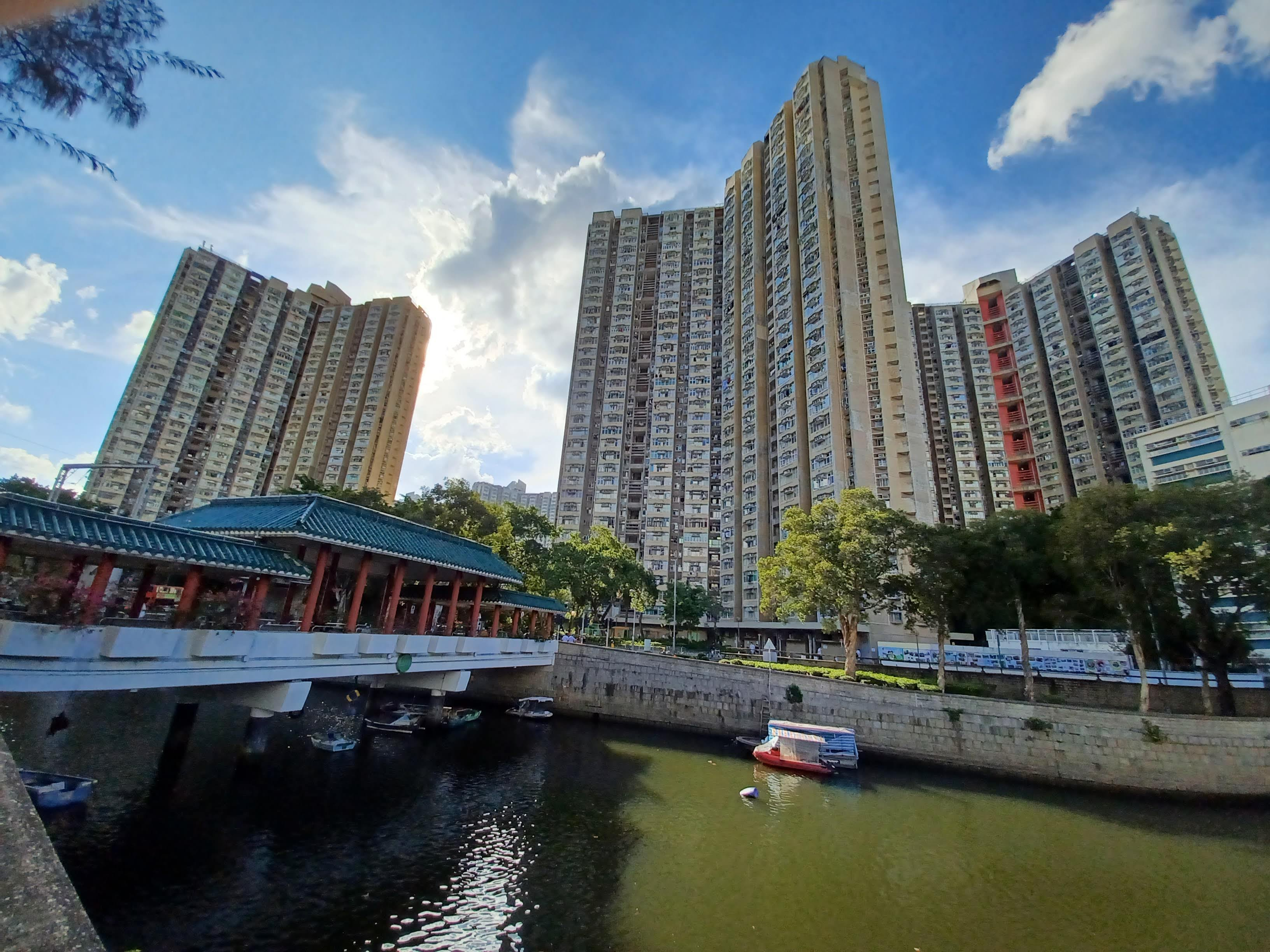
- Tai Wo Estate
- Interactive map of Tai Wo Estate

General information
- Location: 12 Tai Po Tai Wo Road, Tai Po; New Territories, Hong Kong
- Coordinates: 22.45167°N 114.16278°E
- Status: Completed
- Category: Public rental housing
- Population: 19,979 (2016)
- No. of blocks: 9
- No. of units: 2,582

Construction
- Constructed: 1989; 37 years ago
- Authority: Hong Kong Housing Authority

Tai Wo Estate (Chinese: 太和邨) is a mixed TPS and public housing estate in Tai Po, New Territories, Hong Kong, near MTR Tai Wo station. It is one of the public housing estates in Tai Po that is not built on the reclaimed land. The estate consists of nine residential buildings completed in 1989. Some of the flats were sold to tenants through Tenants Purchase Scheme Phase 3 in 2000.

Po Nga Court (寶雅苑) is a Home Ownership Scheme court in Tai Po, near Tai Wo Estate. It consists of three residential buildings built in 1989.

== Houses ==
=== Tai Wo Estate ===
Name	Chinese name	Building type	Completed
Oi Wo House	愛和樓	New Slab	1989
On Wo House	安和樓	New Slab	1989
Hang Wo House	亨和樓	New Slab	1989
Fook Wo House	福和樓	Trident 3	1989
Hei Wo House	喜和樓	Trident 3	1989
Kui Wo House	居和樓	Trident 3	1989
Lai Wo House	麗和樓	Trident 3	1989
Sun Wo House	新和樓	Trident 3	1989
Tsui Wo House	翠和樓	Trident 3	1989

=== Po Nga Court ===
Name	Chinese name	Building type	Completed
Yat Wo House	逸和閣	Trident 3	1989
Hing Wo House	興和閣	Trident 3	1989
Ka Wo House	家和閣	Trident 3	1989

== Demographics ==
According to the 2016 by-census, Tai Wo Estate had a population of 19,979 while Po Nga Court had a population of 6,759. Altogether the population amounts to 26,738.

== Politics ==
For the 2019 District Council election, the estate fell within two constituencies. Most of the estate is located in the Tai Wo constituency, which is represented by Olive Chan Wai-ka, while the remainder of the estate and Po Nga Court falls within the Po Nga constituency, which is represented by Chow Yuen-wai.

== See also ==
- Public housing estates in Tai Po
- Tai Wo#Recent years
