= Hong Kong Railway Museum =

Railway museum in Tai Po, Hong Kong

- 香港鐵路博物館
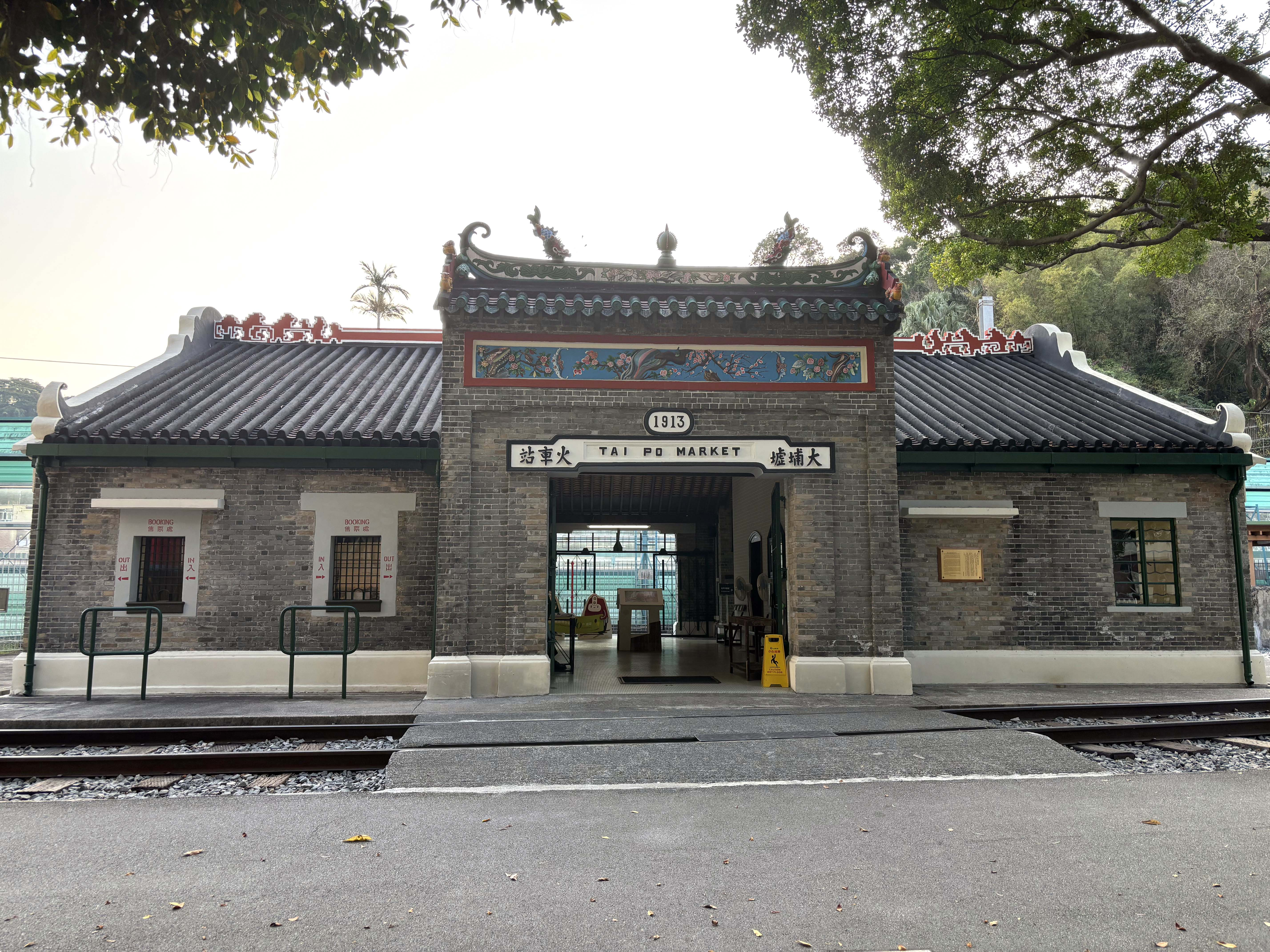
- The old Tai Po Market Station building in 2026
- Interactive fullscreen map
- Former name: Tai Po Market Station (1910–83)
- Established: 20 December 1985; 40 years ago
- Location: 13 Shung Tak Street, Tai Po Market, Tai Po, Hong Kong
- Coordinates: 22°26′54″N 114°09′49″E
- Type: Railway museum
- Visitors: 227,000 (2025)
- Owner: Leisure and Cultural Services Department
- Public transit access: Tai Po Market station (Exit A2); Tai Wo station (Exit B)
- Website: hk.heritage.museum

Hong Kong Railway Museum
- Traditional Chinese: 香港鐵路博物館
Transcriptions
Yue: Cantonese
- Yale Romanization: Heung góng tit louh bok maht gún
- Jyutping: hoeng1 gong2 tit3 lou6 bok3 mat6 gun2

The Hong Kong Railway Museum (HKRM) is a railway museum in Tai Po, Hong Kong. It is managed by the Leisure and Cultural Service Department as a branch museum of the Hong Kong Heritage Museum (HKHM). Opened on 20 December 1985, the HKRM is located at the site where the old Tai Po Market railway station was built in 1913. Admission to the museum is free.

== About the old Tai Po Market railway station ==
Tai Po Market (Tai Po) 大埔墟

General information
- Location: Tai Po District, Hong Kong
- System: Former KCR station
- Owner: Kowloon-Canton Railway Corporation
- Operator: Kowloon-Canton Railway Corporation
- Line: Kowloon–Canton Railway (British Section)
- Platforms: 2 (2 side platforms)
- Tracks: 2
- Connections: Bus, minibus

Construction
- Structure type: At-grade
- Platform levels: 1

Other information
- Status: Ceased operations, converted to museum
- Website: Hong Kong Railway Museum

History
- Opened: 1 October 1910; 115 years ago
- Closed: 6 April 1983; 43 years ago

Services
| Preceding station | KCR | Following station |
|---|---|---|
| Tai Po Kau towards Kowloon | KCR British section | Fanling towards Lo Wu |
Location
- Location within MTR

=== History ===
The Kowloon–Canton Railway (British Section) opened in 1910 at Tai Po Market. It was one of the stops in the New Territories; the station building was erected in 1913. Since then, it has acted as a centre of administration and trade, which indirectly boosted Tai Po Market's economy by bringing traders there.

The Kowloon–Canton Railway was electrified in 1983 and the station was taken out of service, with the opening of the new Tai Wo station north of it and the new Tai Po Market station south of it. One year later, the Old Tai Po Market Railway Station was declared a monument. The site, together with the buildings and relevant exhibits, were then given to Regional Council by the Kowloon-Canton Railway Corporation for the setup of the HKRM, which eventually opened to the public on 20 December 1985.

=== Architecture ===
The station building has a unique architectural style, among the original Kowloon-Canton Railway (British Section) stations. It is of indigenous Chinese architectural style, with a pitched roof with decorative ridges, and many small figures decorating the exterior, such as peonies, red bats, and magpies, that are commonly found in existing historic southern Chinese temples.

== Exhibits ==
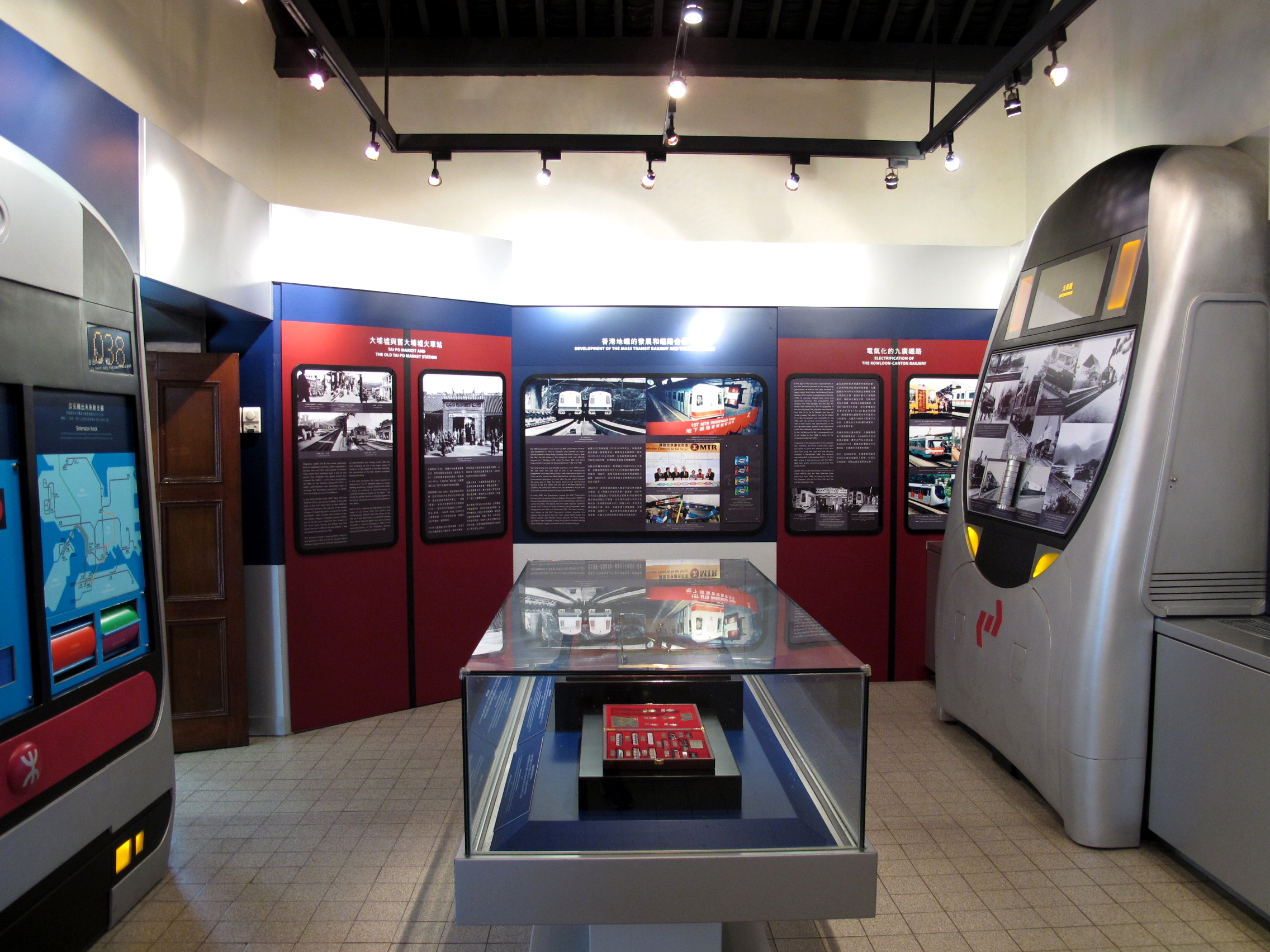
Previous appearance of the exhibition gallery that includes historical pictures and artifacts to help chronicle the story of Hong Kong's railway development. This photo is from 2012.

=== Inside the museum ===
On the right side of the station building, there is an exhibition room that introduces the history of railways in Hong Kong. There are train tickets, railway documents, memorabilia from the 2007 KCR-MTR merger, and models of not only KCR trains but also trains from across the globe. The opposite side of the building contains digital albums of old photos of trains and stations and a refurbished ticket office and signalling house.

=== Rolling stock ===
Three locomotives are on display at the HKRM:

- EMD G12 diesel-electric locomotive No. 51 Sir Alexander - introduced in 1955 as Hong Kong's first ever diesel locomotive, and named after then Governor Alexander Grantham, marking the KCR's transition from steam to diesel. After a new batch of diesel locomotives arrived in Hong Kong in late 2003, Sir Alexander was withdrawn from service. KCR Corporation staff spent more than 1000 hours restoring it to its original 1955 appearance, removing rust, repainting it dark green, and restoring the period-accurate logo. It was donated to the HKHM to be put on static display at the HKRM on 18 May 2004.
- EMD G26 diesel-electric locomotive No. 60 Peter Quick - Originally purchased by the KCR in 1973, it was leased to the MTR after the MTR-KCR merger. Peter Quick was withdrawn in 2022 and moved to the HKRM to be exhibited on static display in October 2023.
- W. G. Bagnall 0-4-4T narrow gauge steam locomotive No. 17BG - The locomotive is one of two of its type that formerly ran on the narrow gauge Sha Tau Kok Railway branch line between Fanling and Sha Tau Kok. Following closure of the line in 1928, after only 17 years of operation, the locomotives were sold to Victorias Milling Co., Inc., a sugar mill in the Philippines. There, they were numbered 17BG and 18BG. The operators in the Philippines negotiated with the KCR Corporation to return 17BG back to Hong Kong, and succeeded in 1995. Soon, the locomotive was restored to its original appearance by the KCRC to be acquired by the HKHM for display at the HKRM. The other locomotive of the pair was also brought back to Hong Kong and is reported to be undergoing restoration.

There are seven historic coaches on the tracks for public viewing and appreciation of the contrast between the older and newer designs.

- 1911 third-class coach No. 302 - the oldest surviving piece of rolling stock in the region
- 1921 engineering brake coach No. 002
- 1921 third-class coach No. 313
- 1955 third-class coach No. 223 (an educational video room)
- 1955 third-class combination coach No. 229
- 1964 first-class coach No. 112
- 1976 ordinary-class coach No. 276

Railway inspection vehicles, specifically a pump trolley and diesel-engined railcar, are also on display at the museum.

A 1:1 scale model of a non-refurbished East Rail line Metro Cammell EMU was once on display at the Museum, but was removed in 2004 to make space for Sir Alexander.

== Transportation ==
The museum is right in the middle between Tai Po Market and Tai Wo stations on the MTR. It accessible within walking distance northwest from Exit A2 of the former and southeast from Exit B of the latter.

== Gallery ==
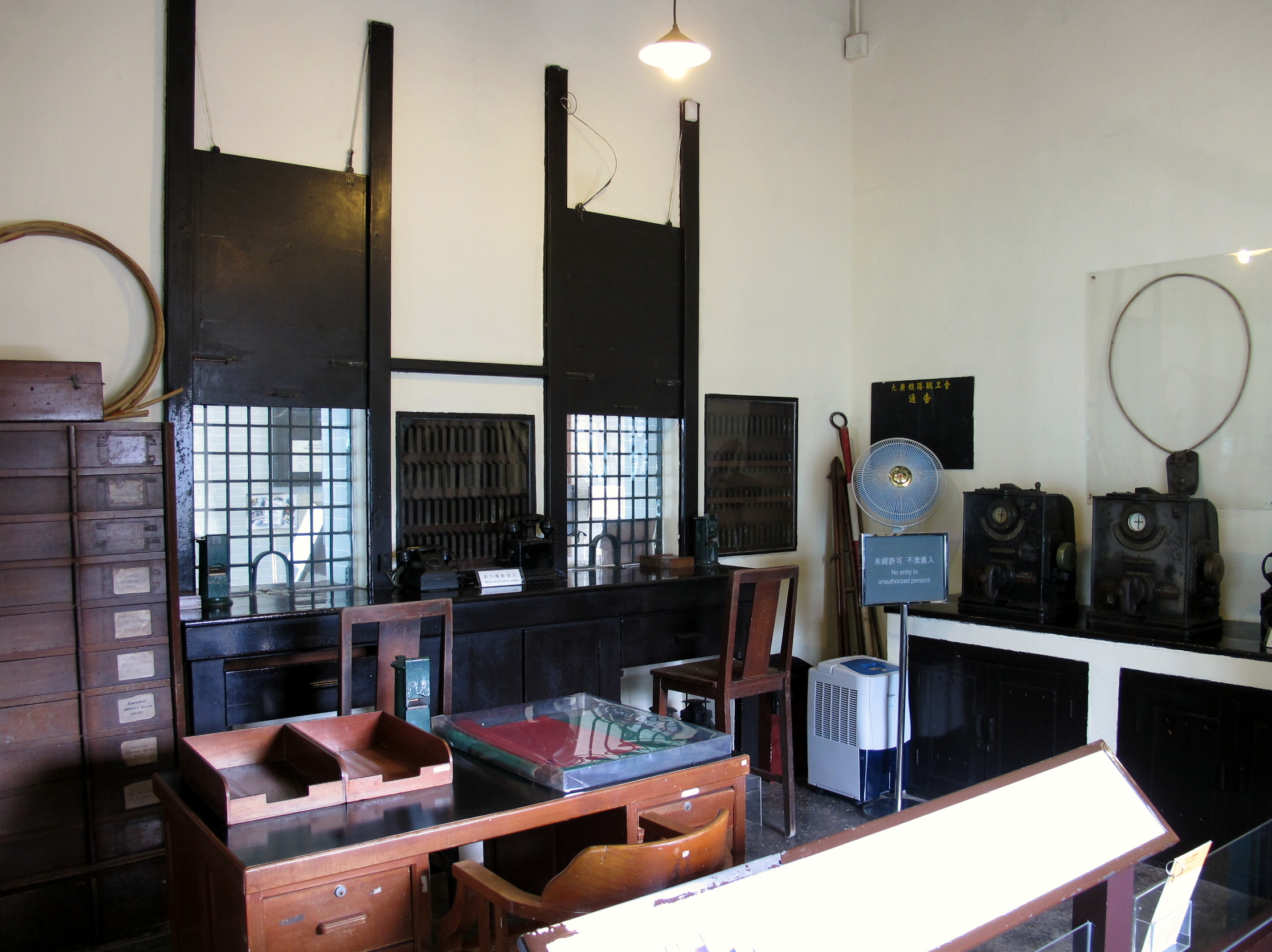
The ticket office

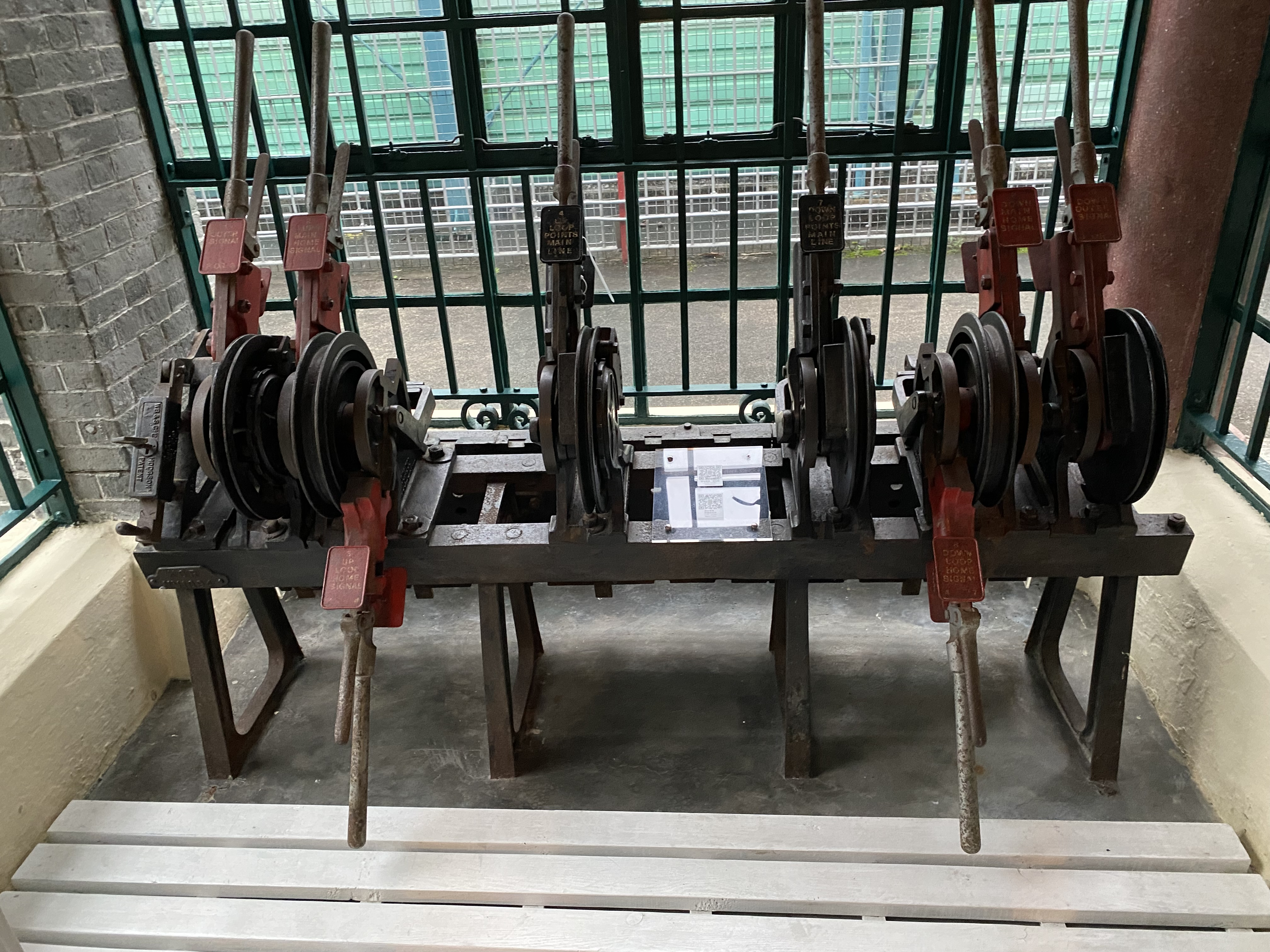
Signal lever frame

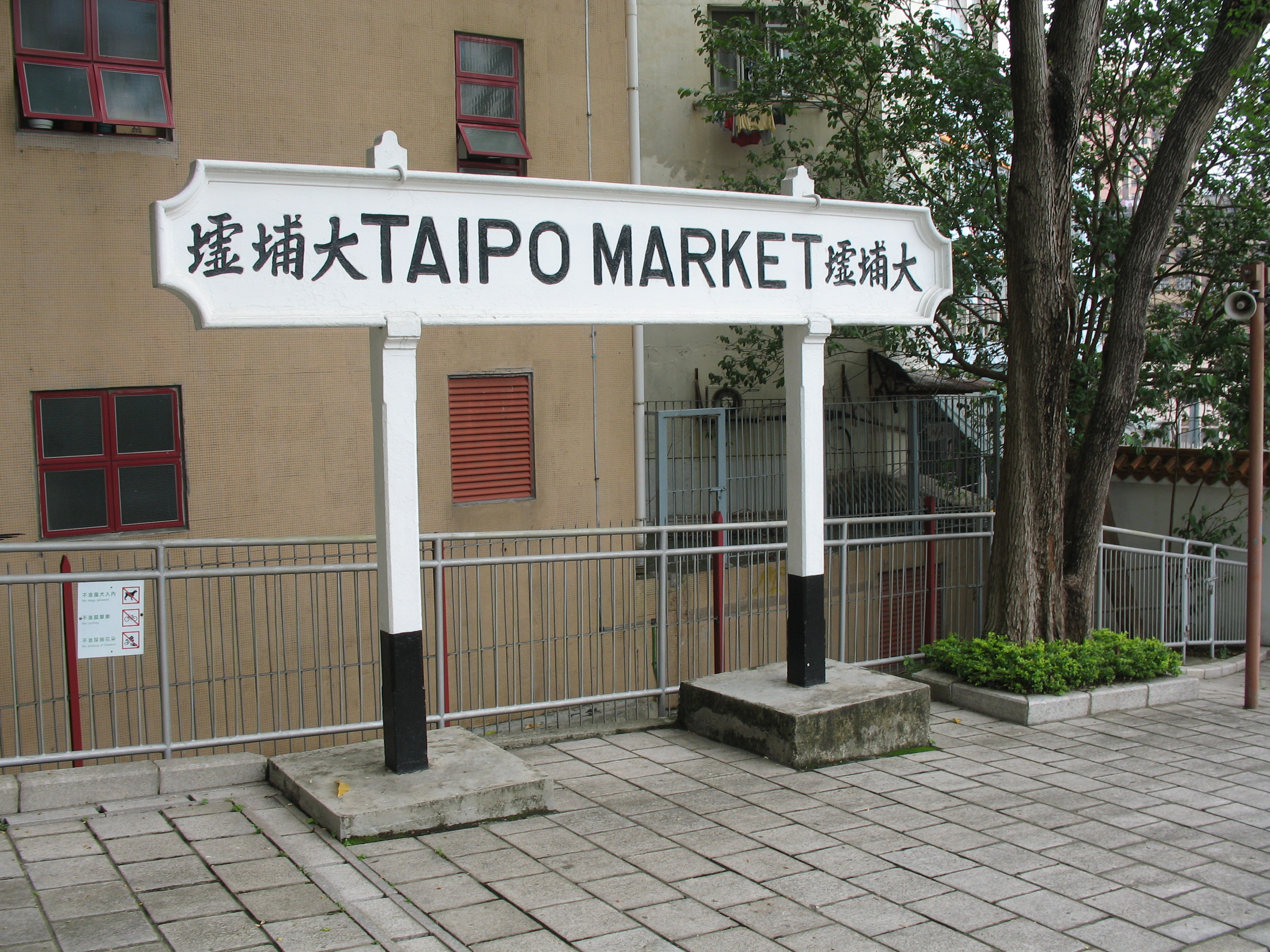
Old Tai Po Market station sign

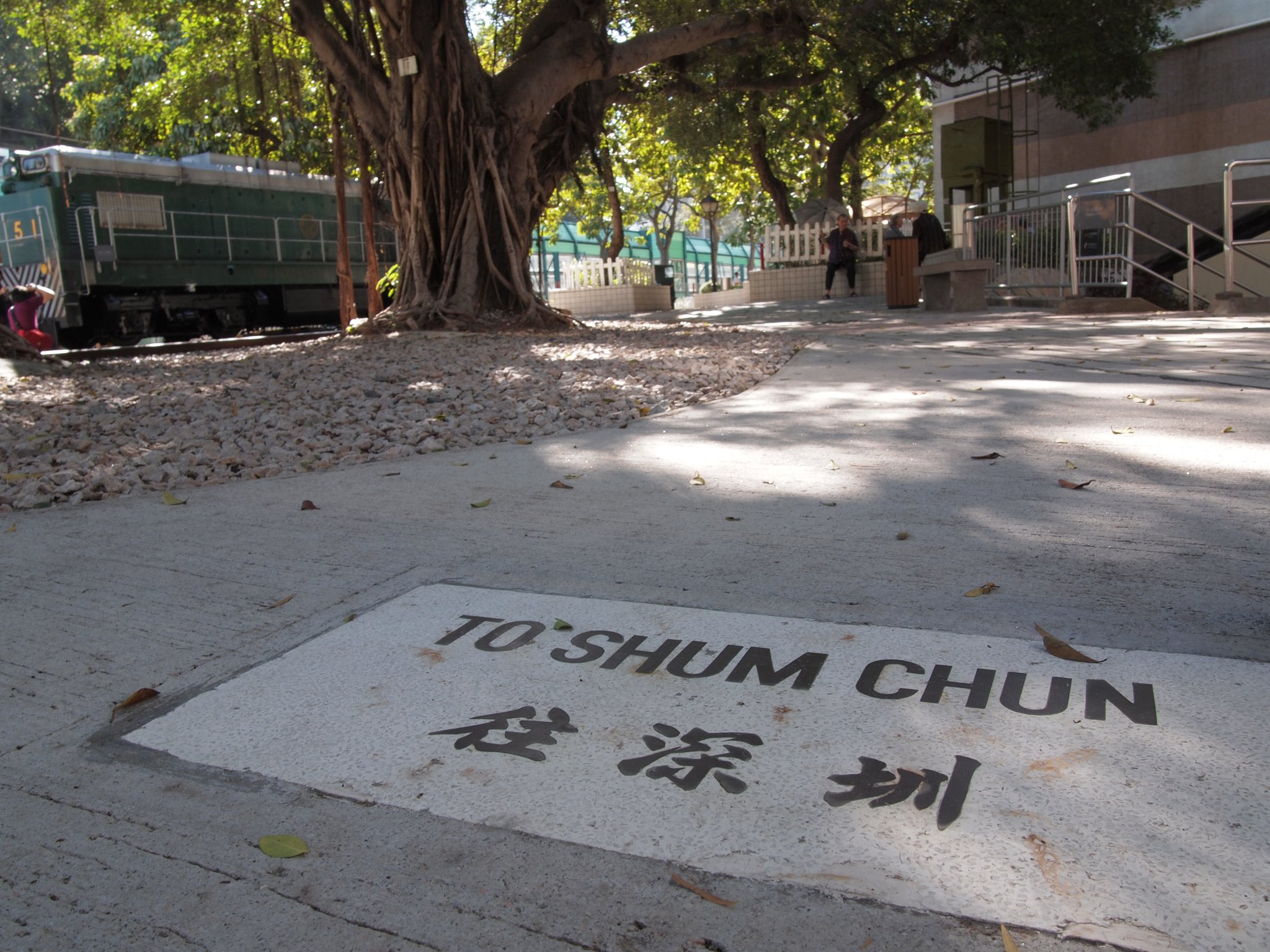
"To Shum Chun" sign

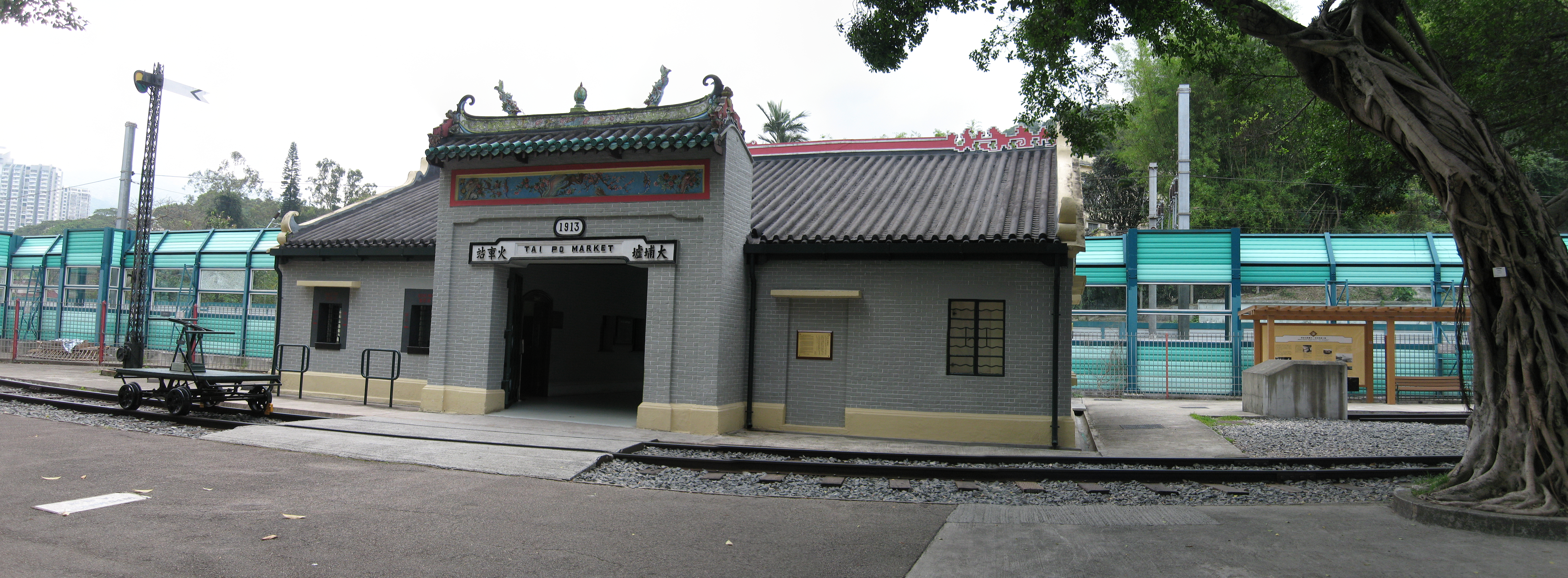
Tai Po Market station panorama

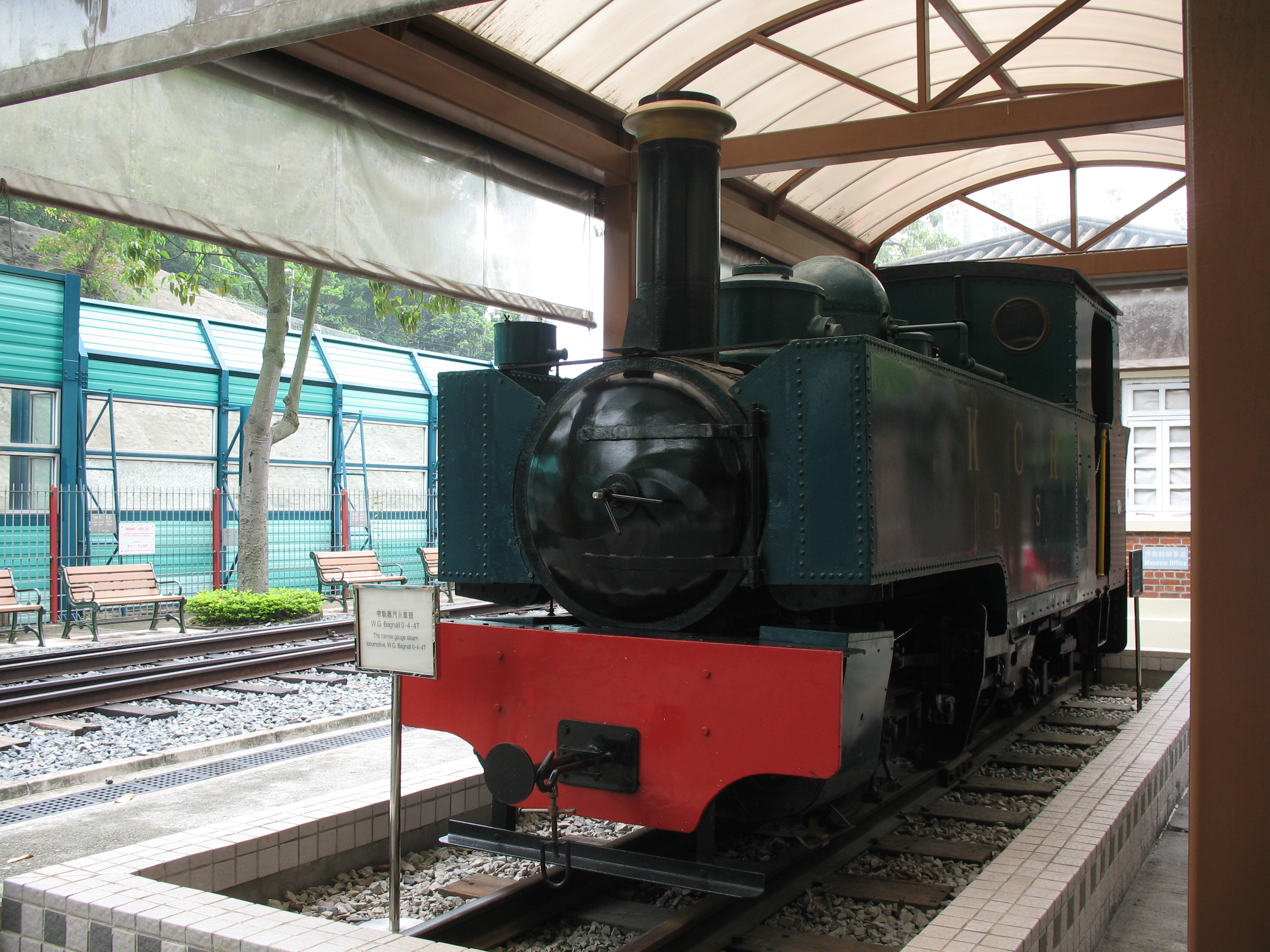
W. G. Bagnall 0-4-4T steam locomotive

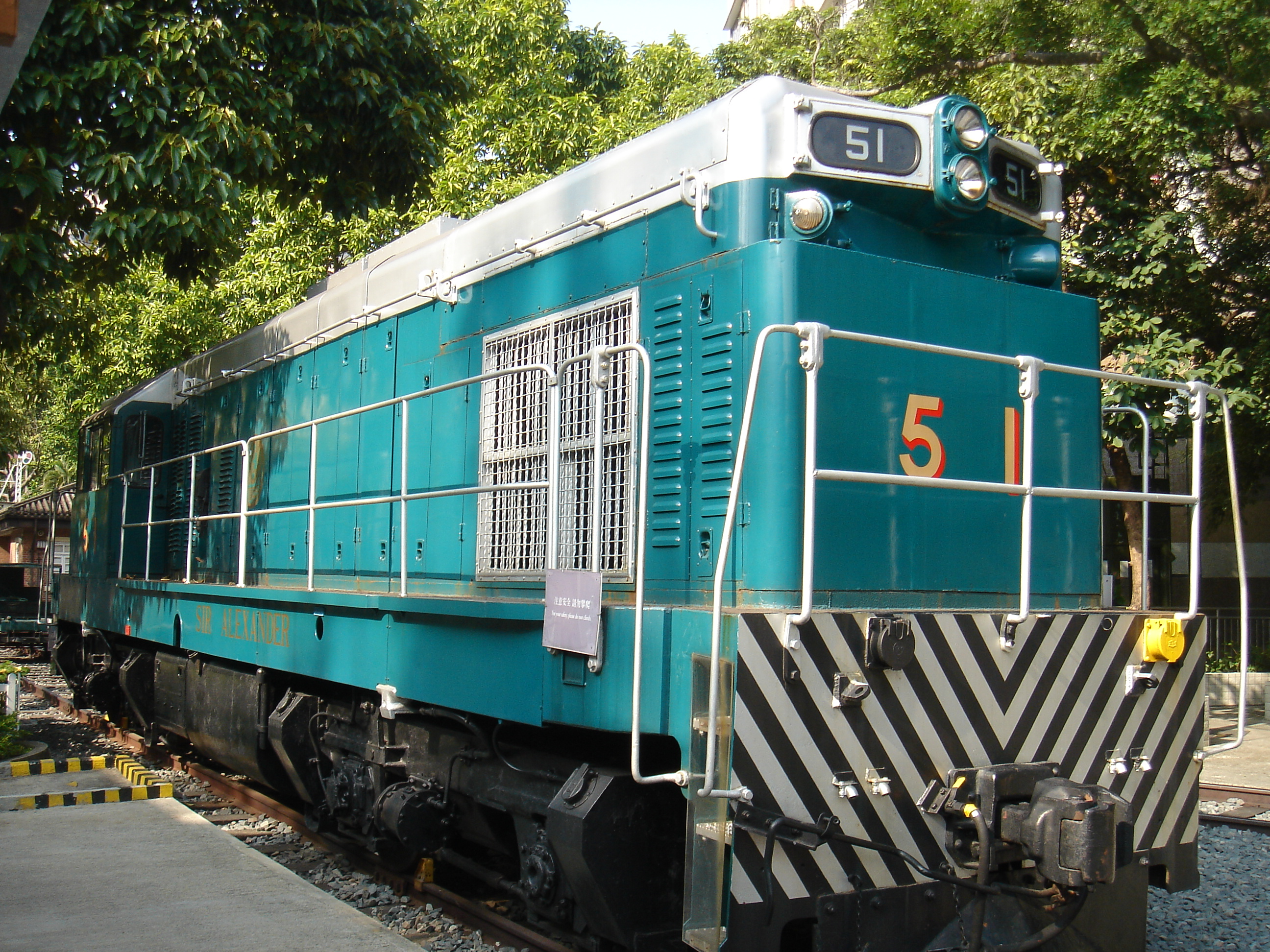
EMD G12 No. 51 Sir Alexander

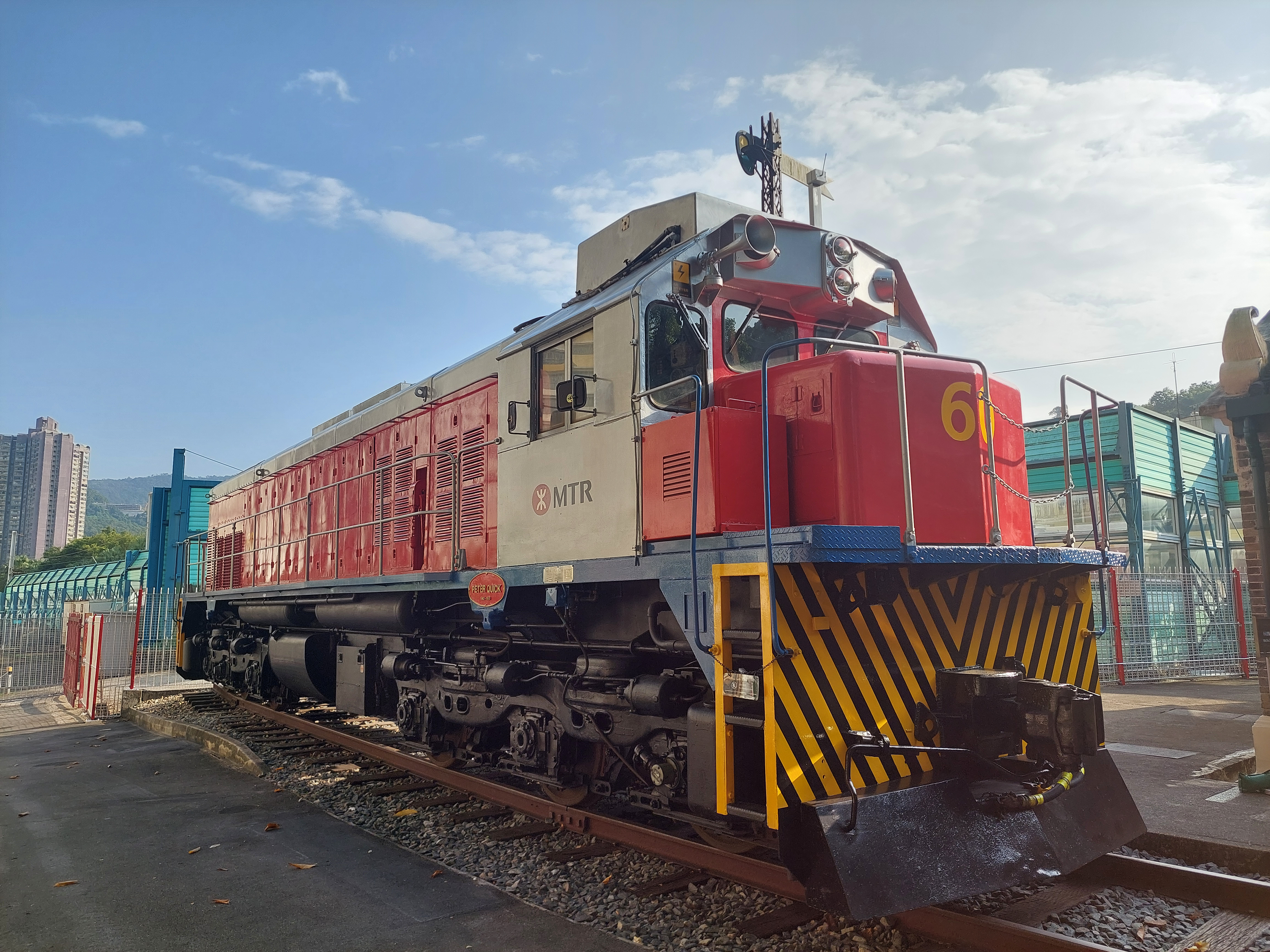
EMD G26 No. 60 Peter Quick

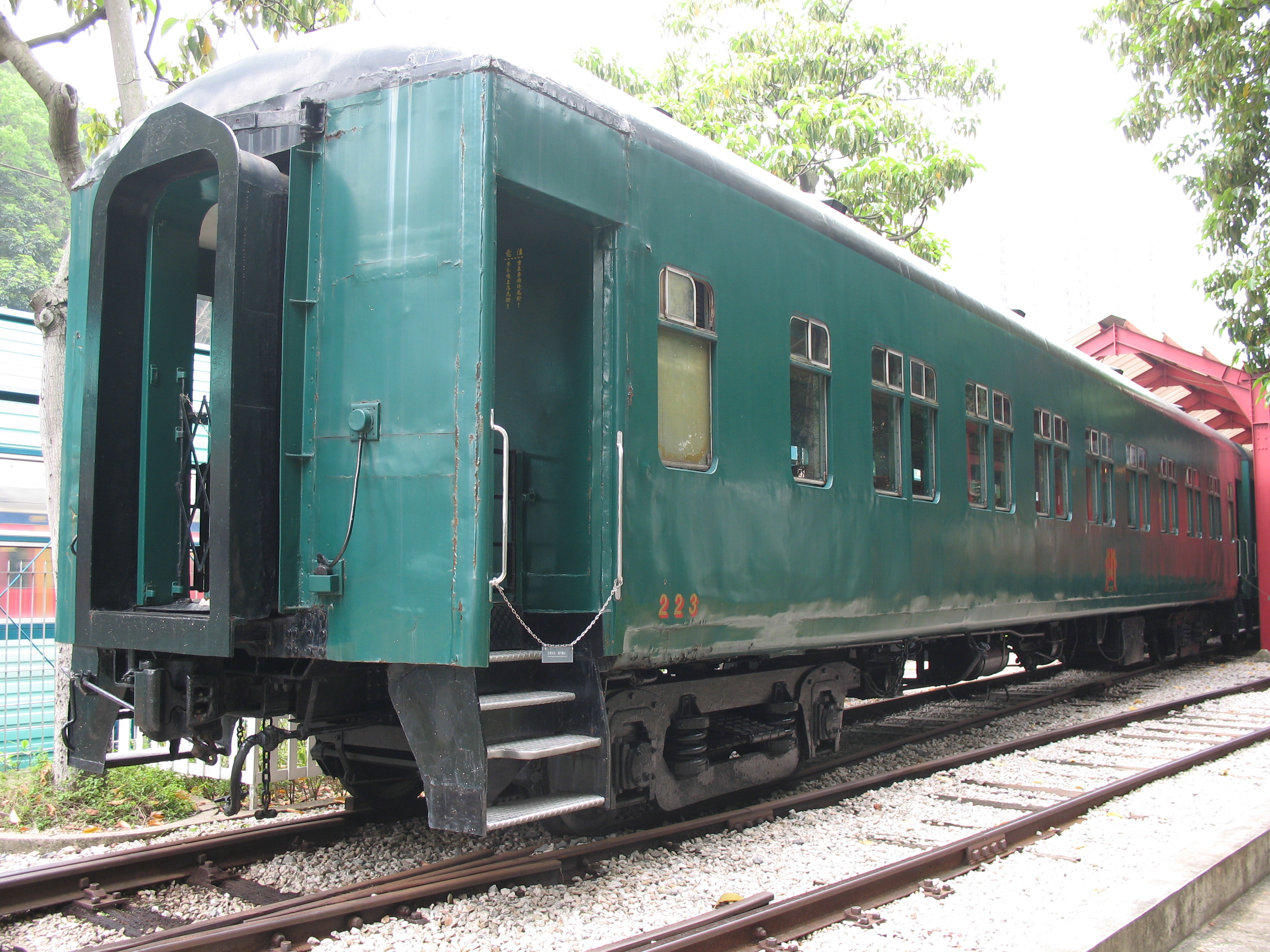
Historic coach 223

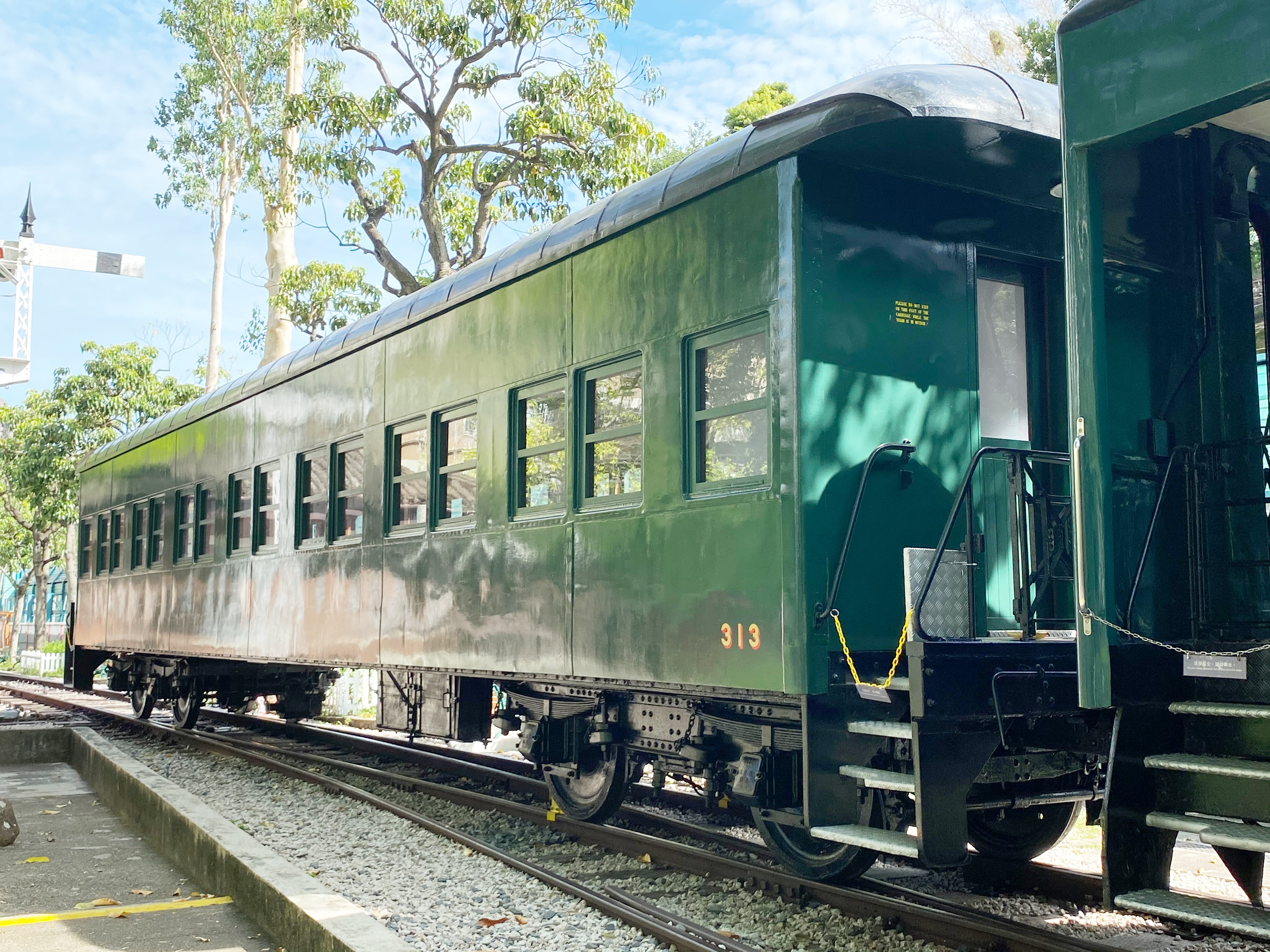
Historic coach 313

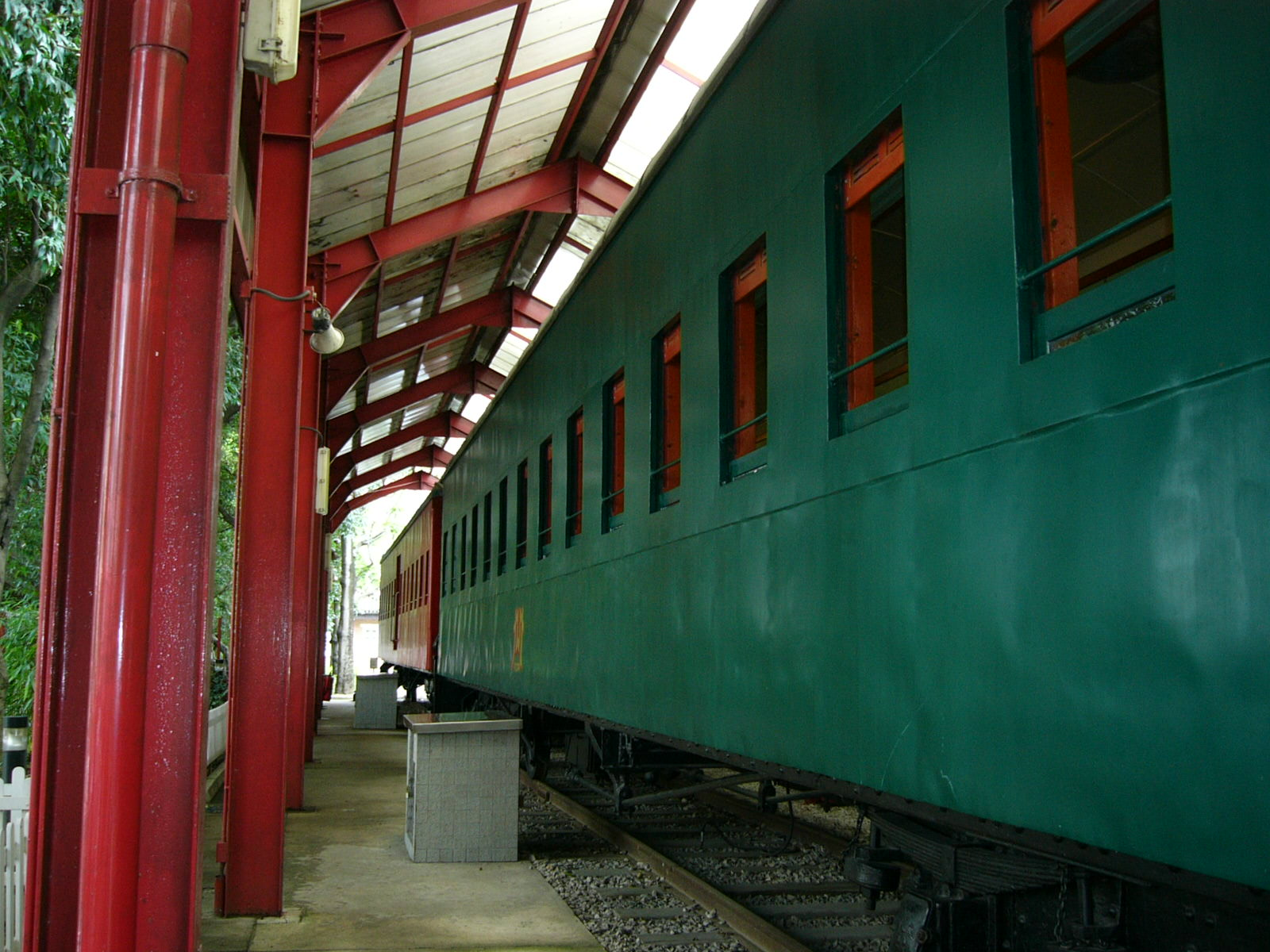
Historic coach 302

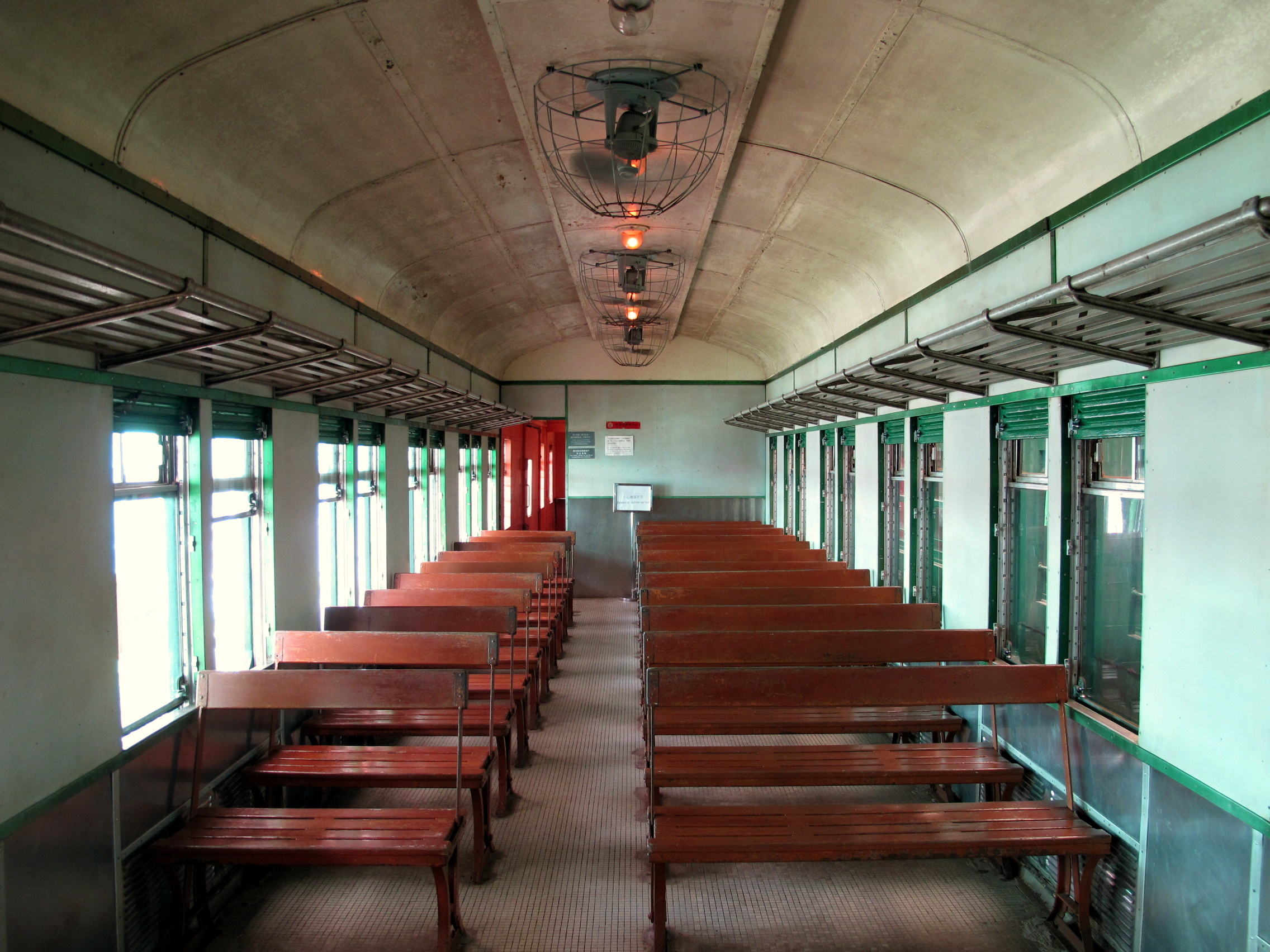
Inside the 1911 third-class compartment

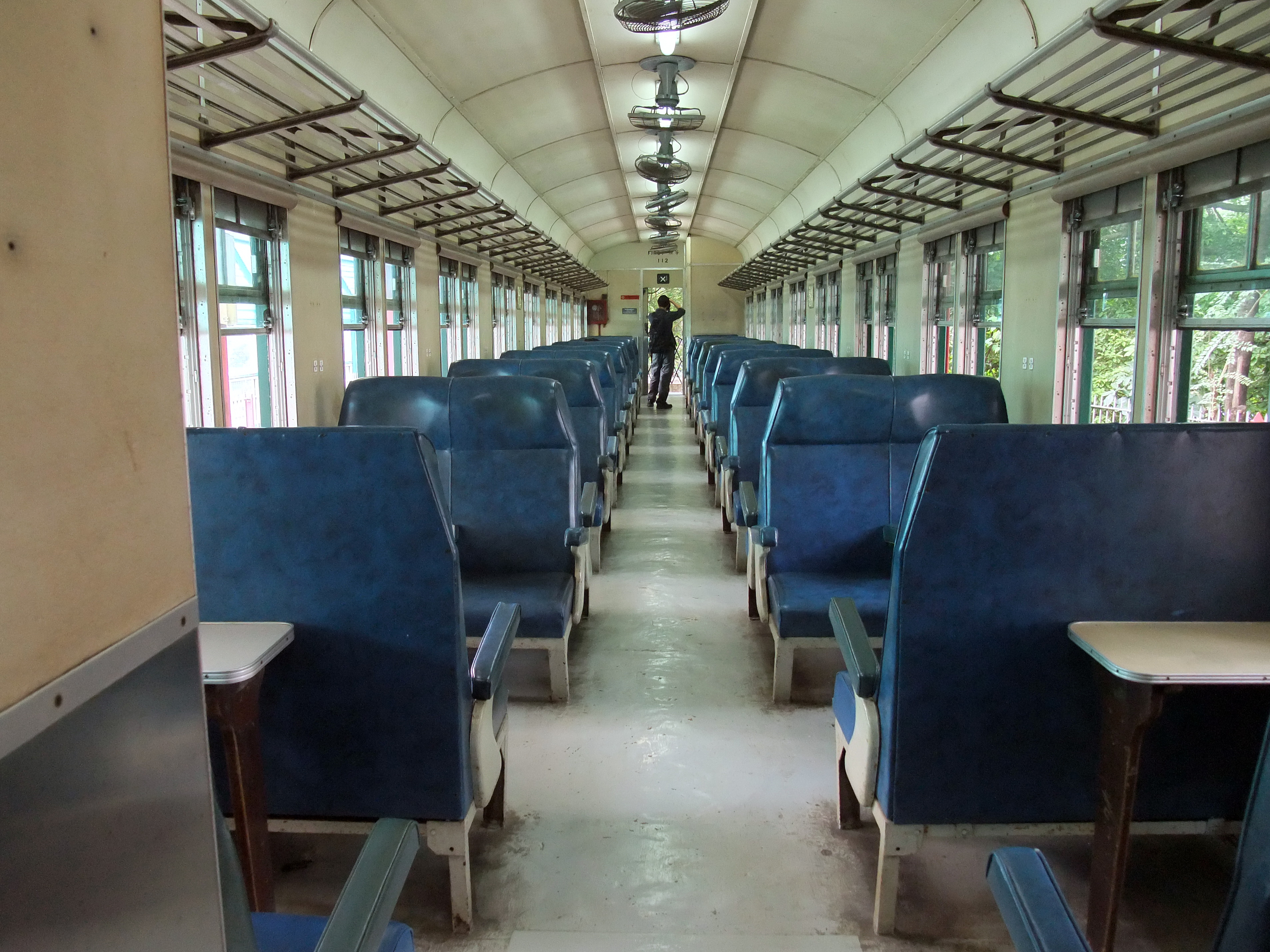
Inside the 1964 first-class compartment

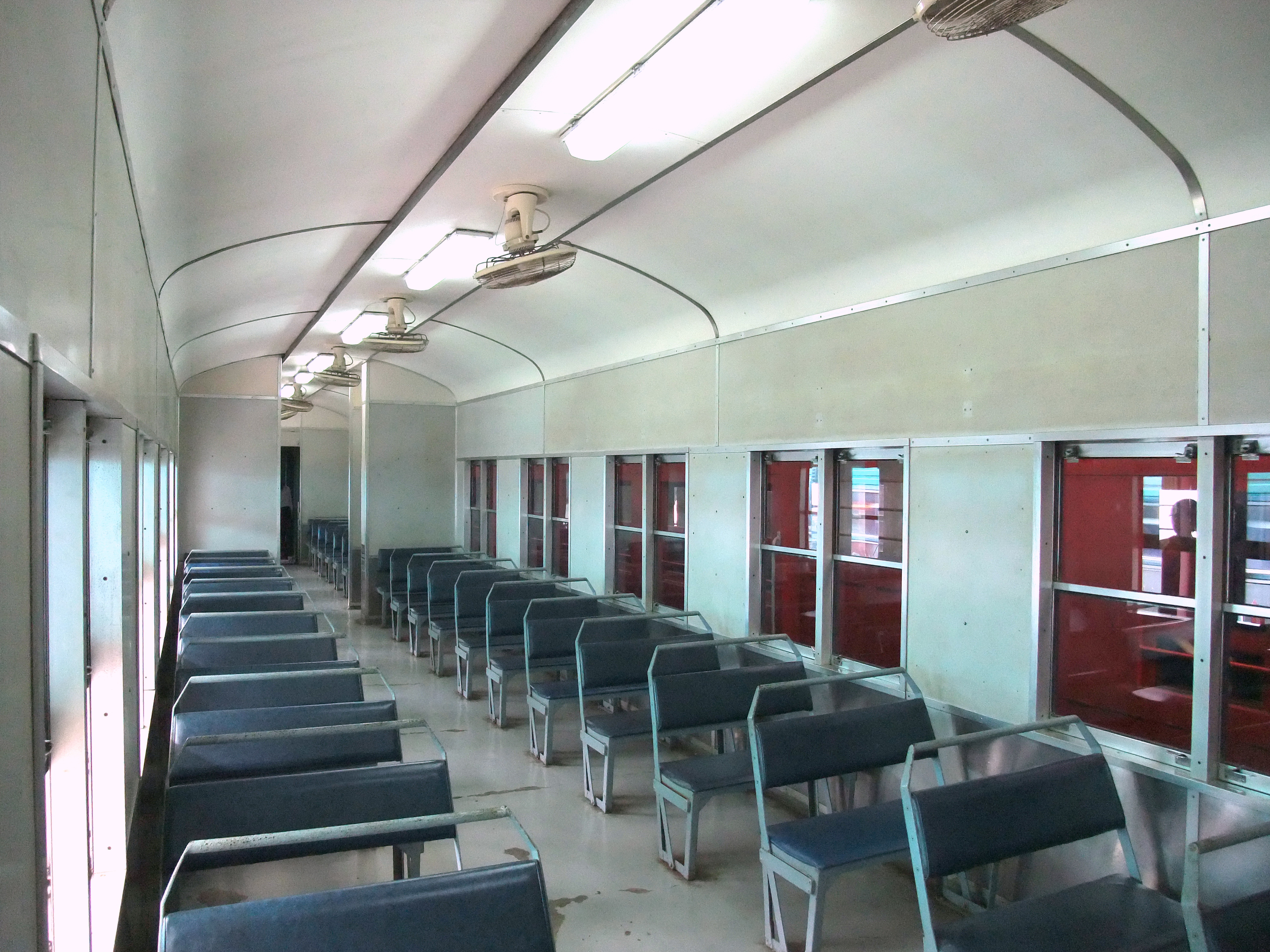
Inside the 1974 ordinary-class compartment

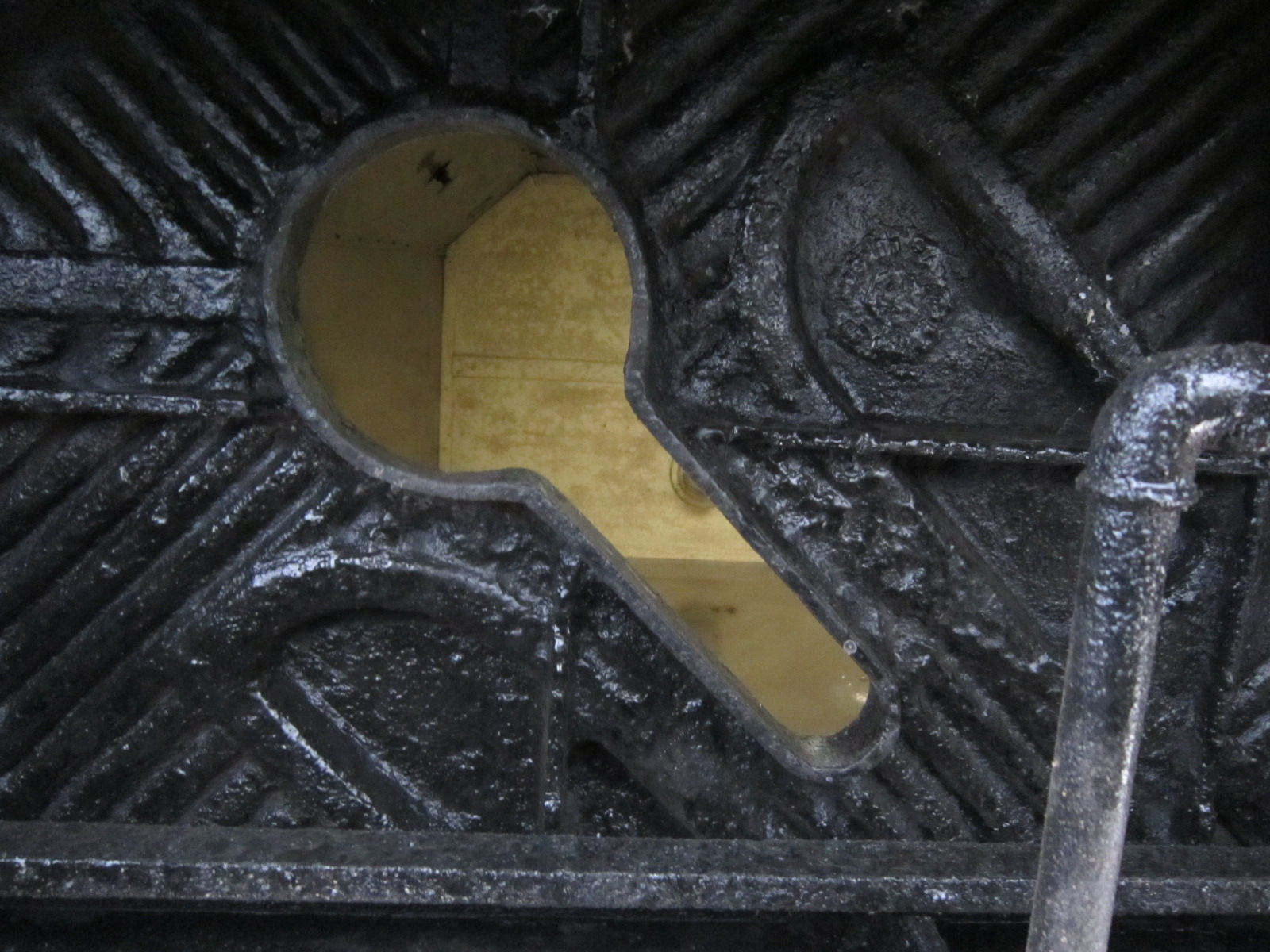
Inside the 1955 third-class compartment's toilet

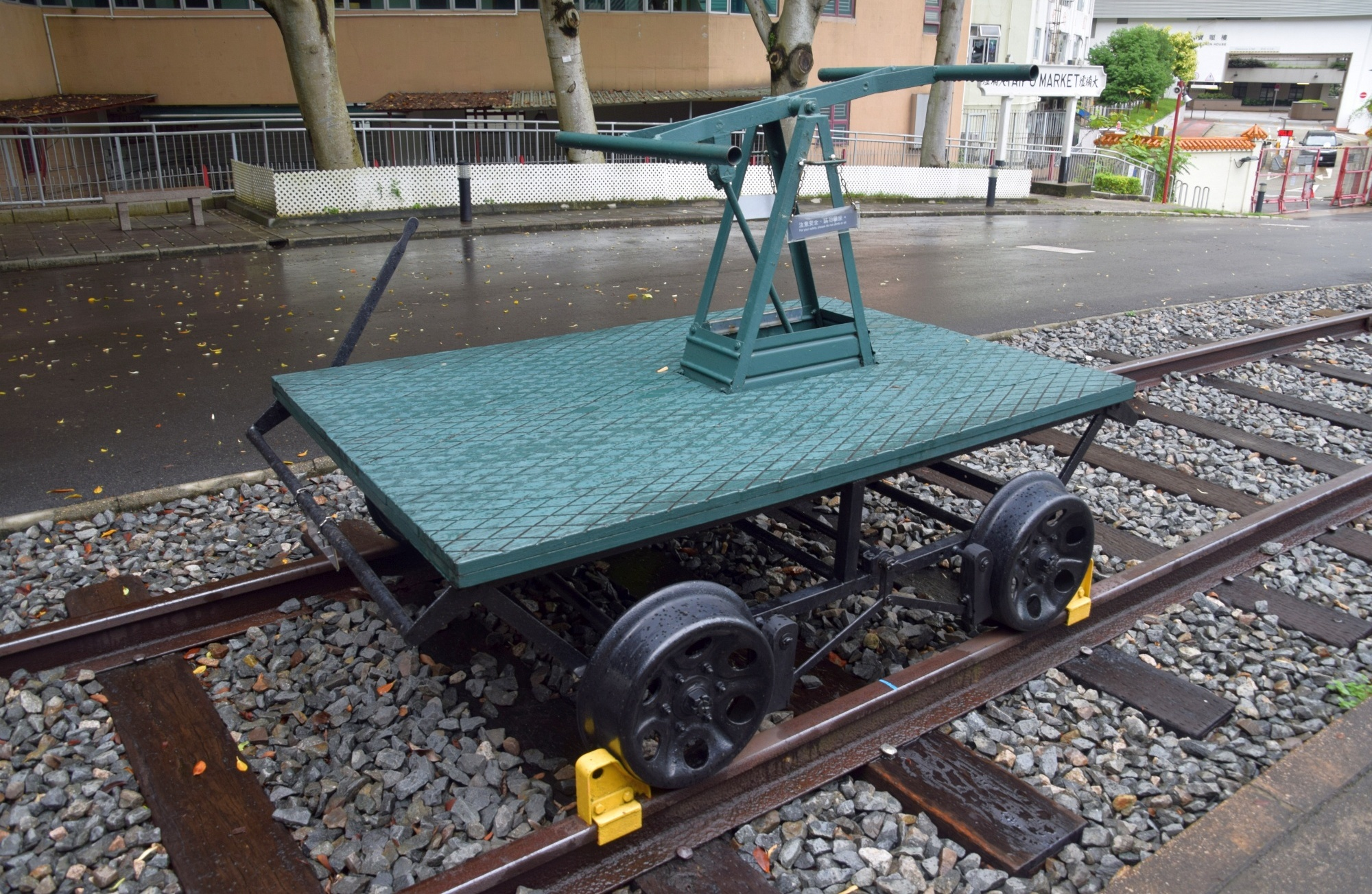
Pump trolley

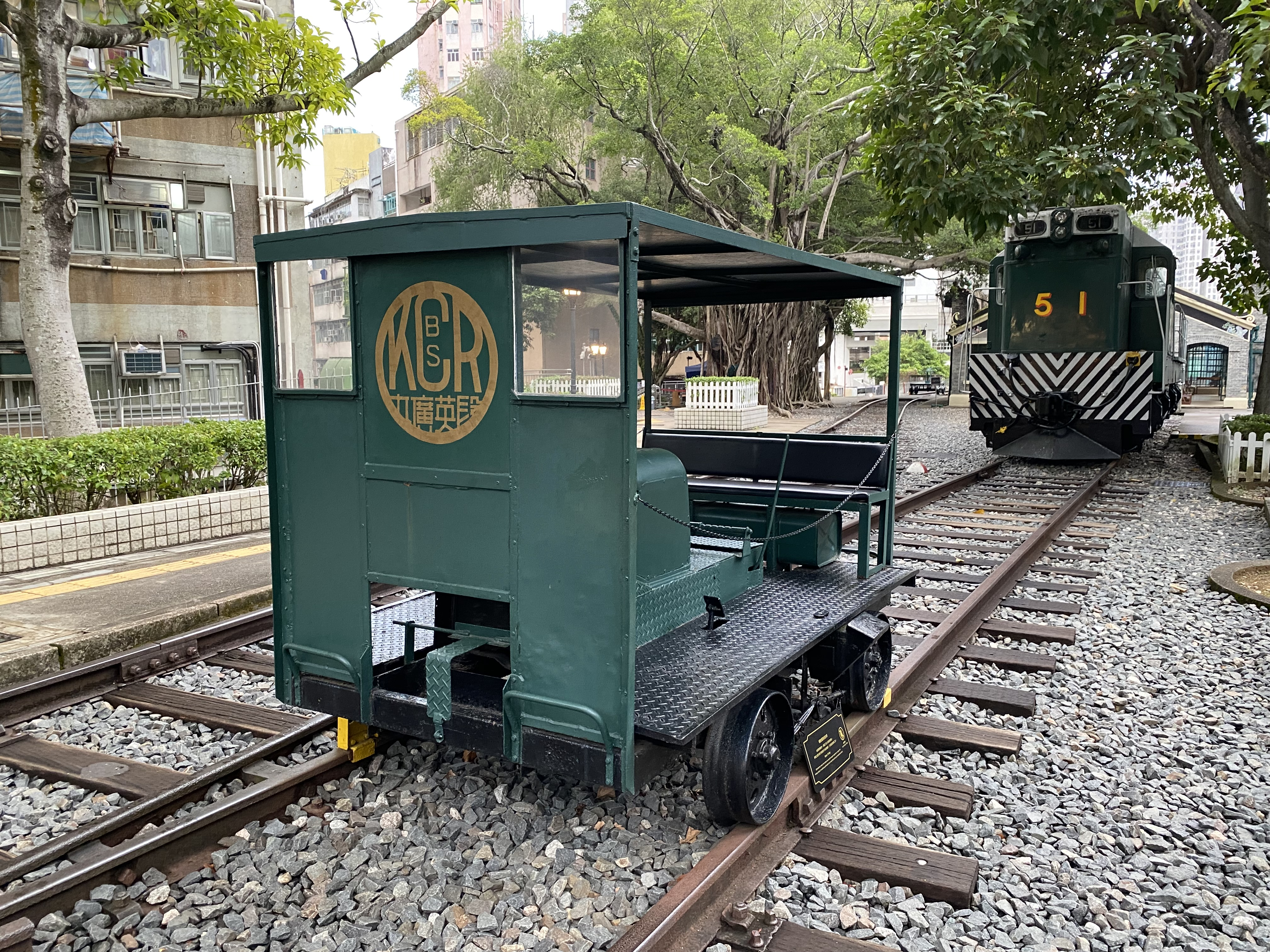
Motor trolley (railway inspection vehicle)

== See also ==
- List of museums in Hong Kong
- Tai Wo, the local area which the former station was situated
