= Sha Tin station =

Railway station in Sha Tin, Hong Kong

Sha Tin 沙田
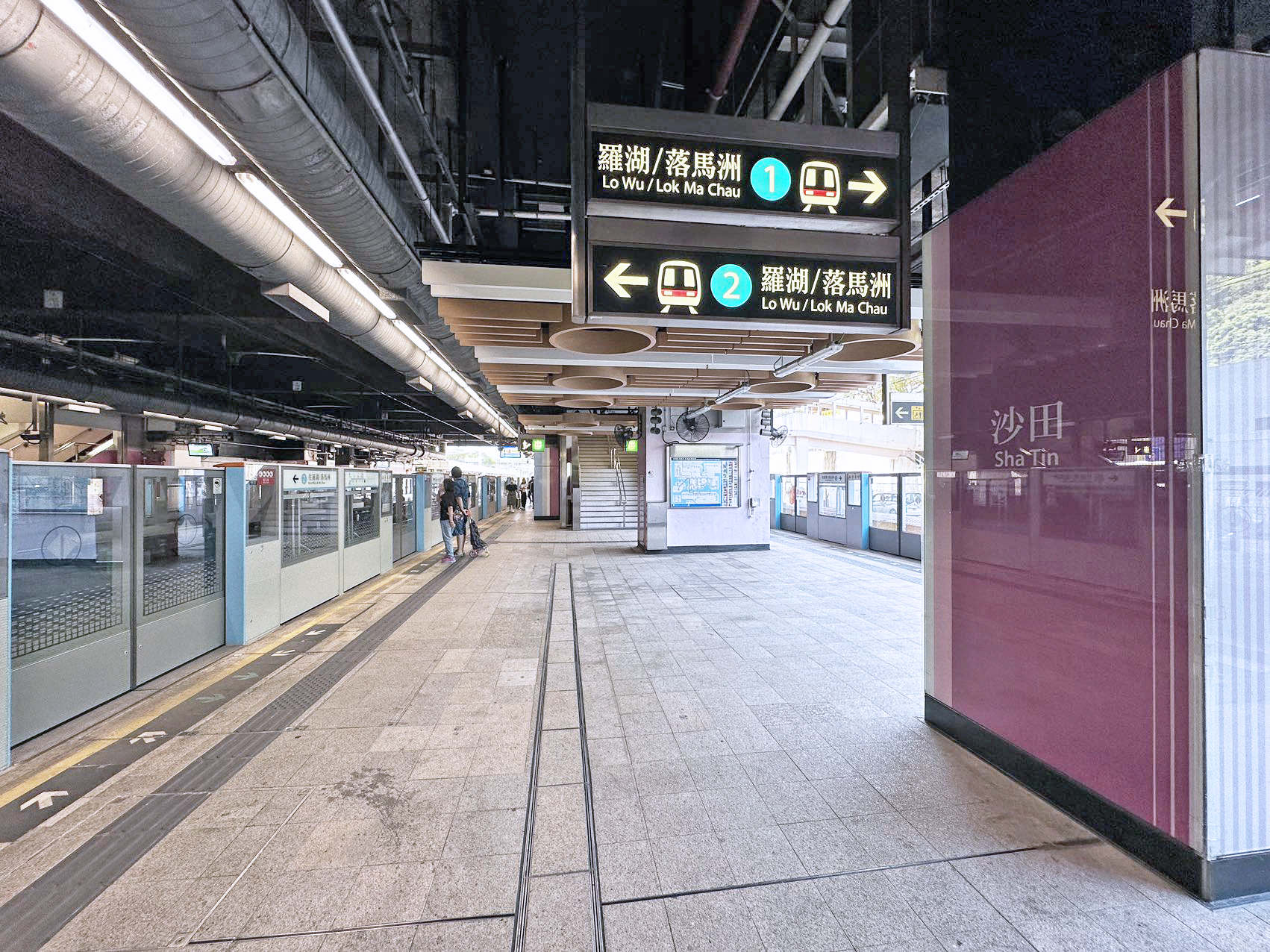
- Platforms 1 and 2 in October 2024

Chinese name
- Chinese: 沙田
- Jyutping: saa^{1} tin^{4}
- Cantonese Yale: Sātìn
- Hanyu Pinyin: Shātián
- Literal meaning: Sand Field
Transcriptions
Standard Mandarin
- Hanyu Pinyin: Shātián
Yue: Cantonese
- Yale Romanization: Sātìn
- IPA: [sa˥.tʰin˩]
- Jyutping: saa^{1} tin^{4}

General information
- Location: Sha Tin Station Circuit/Pai Tau Street, Sha Tin; Sha Tin District, Hong Kong
- Coordinates: 22°22′57″N 114°11′15″E
- System: MTR rapid transit station
- Owner: KCR Corporation
- Operator: MTR Corporation
- Line: East Rail line
- Platforms: 4 (2 island platforms)
- Tracks: 6
- Connections: Bus, minibus; Taxi

Construction
- Structure type: At-grade
- Platform levels: 1
- Accessible: Yes

Other information
- Station code: SHT

History
- Opened: 1 October 1910; 116 years ago
- Electrified: 6 May 1982; 44 years ago

Services
Preceding station	MTR	Following station
Tai Wai towards Admiralty	East Rail line	Fo Tan towards Lo Wu or Lok Ma Chau
Tai Wai towards Admiralty	East Rail line Race days only	Racecourse towards Lo Wu or Lok Ma Chau
Tai Wai towards Admiralty	East Rail line Trains leaving/returning depot	Terminus

Former services
Preceding station	KCR	Following station
Yaumati / Mong Kok towards Kowloon	KCR British section	University towards Lo Wu
Track layout
Location
- Location within MTR

Sha Tin station, formerly known as Sha Tin railway station, (Chinese: 沙田火車站 or Chinese: 沙田鐵路站) is a station on the East Rail line of Hong Kong's Mass Transit Railway (MTR) system. The station is located in the town centre of Sha Tin. Its livery is orchid purple for the platforms and brown for the concourse.

The station was formerly on the main line of the Kowloon–Canton Railway (KCR), but since KCR's merger with the MTR, it belongs to the East Rail line of the MTR.

Citylink Plaza, which has a footbridge link to New Town Plaza, is built on top of the station. The station serves two large bus termini with buses going to many places around Hong Kong (such as Sai Kung or Tung Chung). One is on an elevated surface, adjacent to the concourse level. The other is at ground level in New Town Plaza.

== History ==
The station originally opened on 1 October 1910. The railway was single-track at that time, but Sha Tin station had a passing loop. The station office was housed in a single-storey stone building.

Sha Tin station was rebuilt in the early 1980s in preparation for the railway's electrification. On 6 May 1982, Sir Philip Haddon-Cave unveiled a plaque in the concourse of Sha Tin station to open the first phase of electric service, which spanned from Hung Hom to Shatin initially. At the same time, daily service hours to Sha Tin were extended from 10:30 pm to midnight. Electric service was extended to Tai Po on 2 May 1983, and to Lo Wu (the full length of the KCR British Section) on 15 July 1983. The new station initially had a branch of Hang Seng Bank, for people in need of coin exchange and banking services.

The Citylink Plaza, an HK$82 million building that originally housed the headquarters of the KCR Corporation as well as many government offices, was built on top of the station and opened in 1983.

The station concourse was substantially renovated from 2010 to 2013.

== Layout ==
There are two island platforms for platforms 1 and 2, and platforms 3 and 4 respectively.

Trains normally stop at platforms 2 and 3. Platforms 1 and 4 were used for special departures, or race days.

This station's layout is similar to Tai Po Market station.

Notes:

- Platform 1 serves as a buffer to eschew through trains and is also used for special departures during peak hours and race days
- Platform 4 is used for special departures during peak hours and race days.

-	above station	Citylink Plaza, taxi stand
C	Concourse	Exits/entrances, bus terminus, customer service centre, toilets, shops, vending machines, automated teller machines, lockers
P Platforms	Platform 1	East Rail line towards Lo Wu or Lok Ma Chau (Fo Tan / Racecourse) →
P Platforms	Island platform, doors open on the left or right
P Platforms	Platform 2	East Rail line towards Lo Wu or Lok Ma Chau (Fo Tan / Racecourse) →
P Platforms	Platform 3	← East Rail line towards Admiralty (Tai Wai)
P Platforms	Island platform, doors open on the left or right
P Platforms	Platform 4	← East Rail line towards Admiralty (Tai Wai)

=== Gallery ===
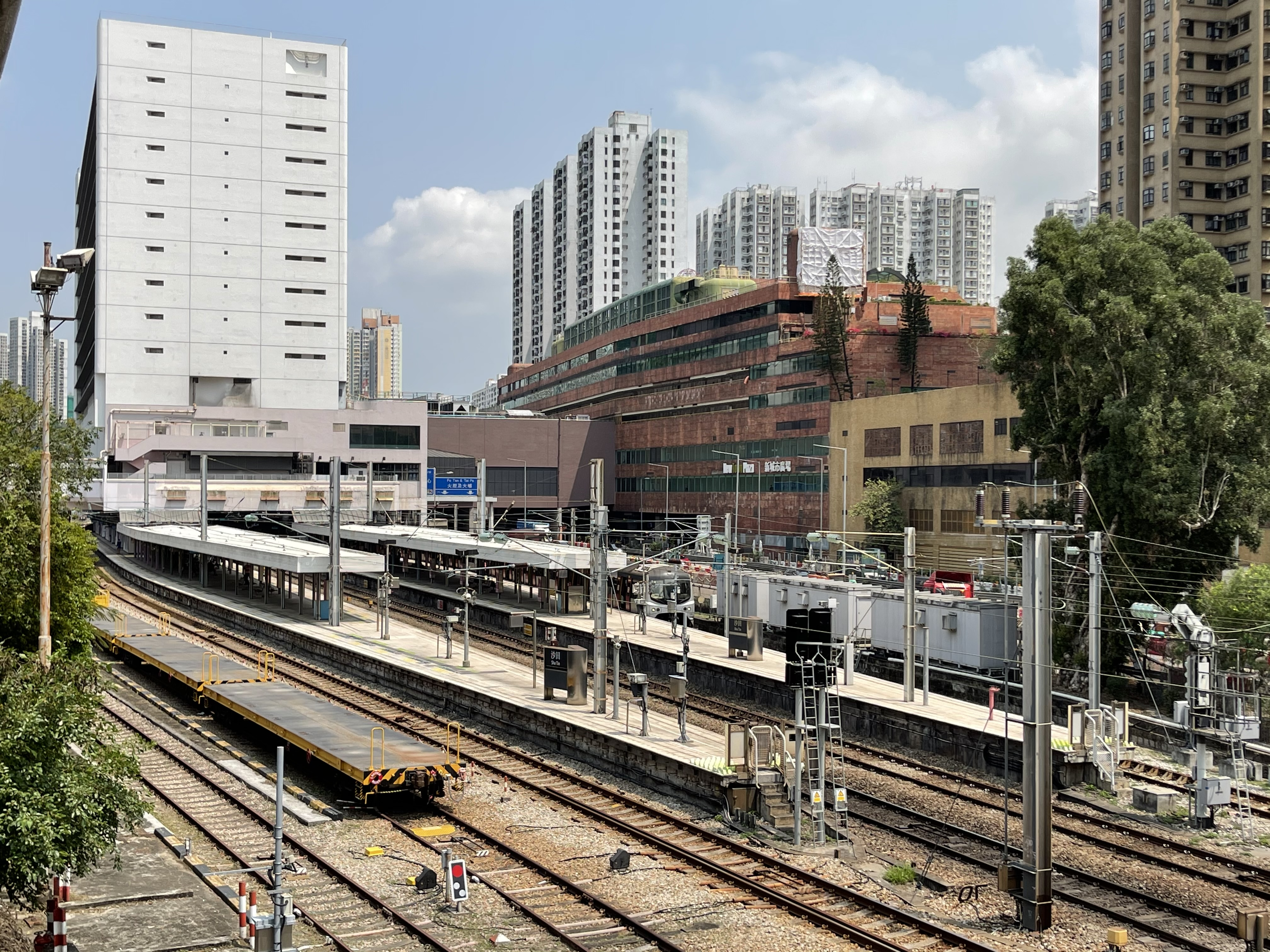
Sha Tin station (March 2021)

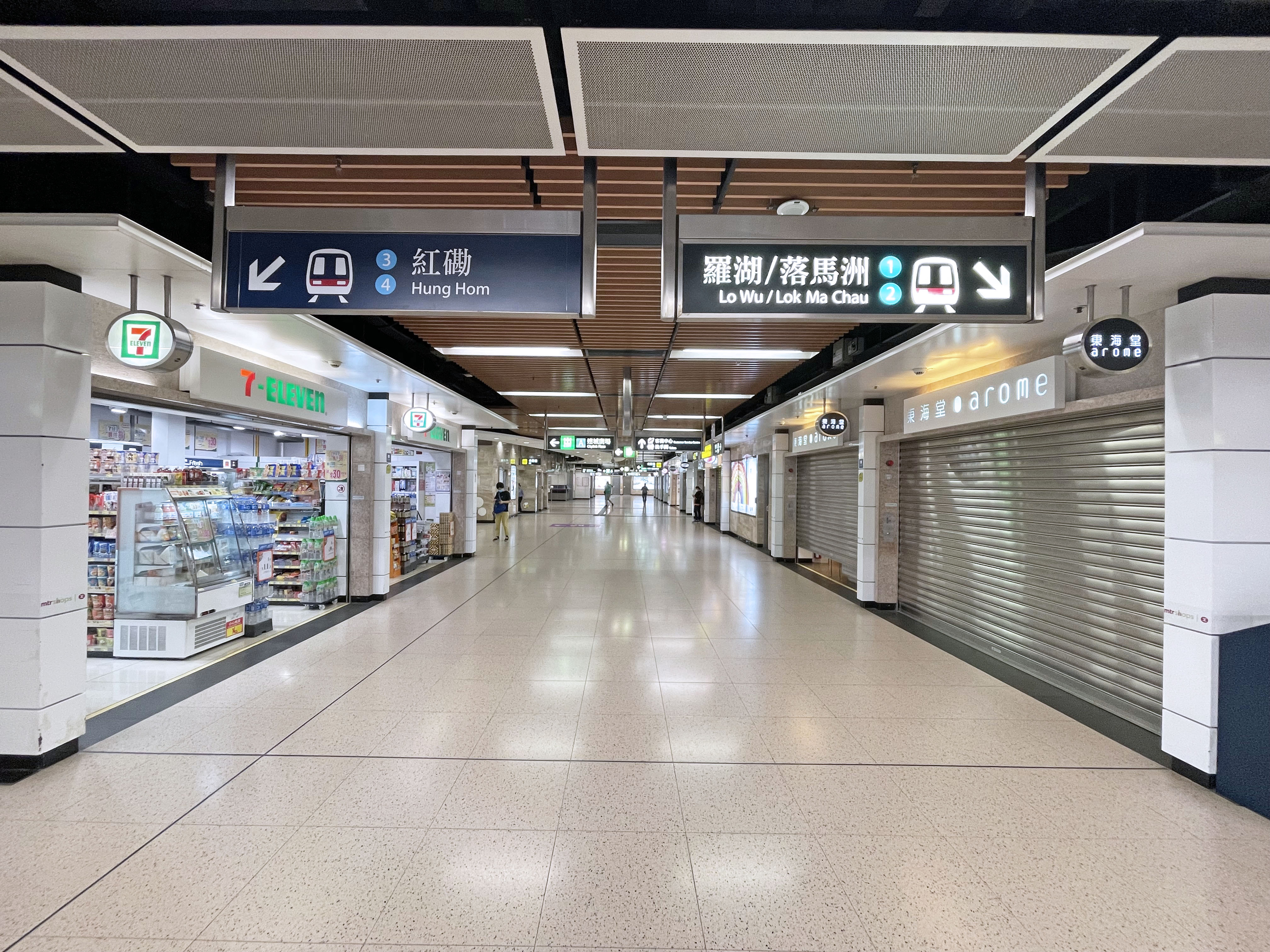
Paid area of the concourse (April 2022)

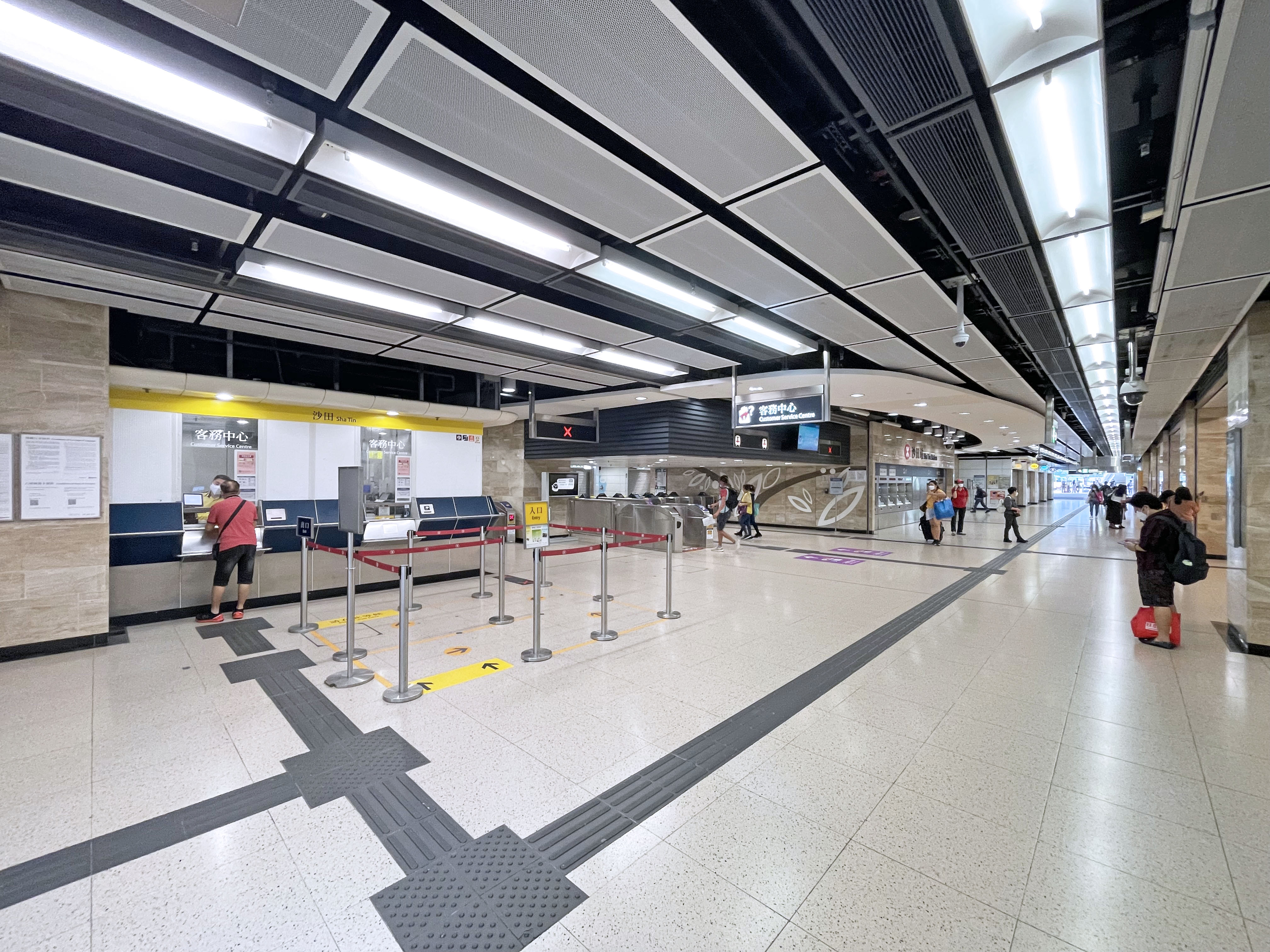
Unpaid area of the concourse, with the customer service centre (April 2022)

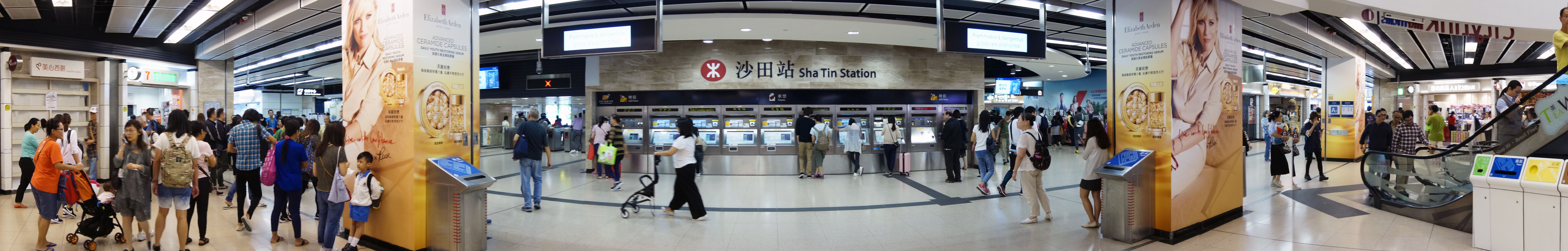
Ticket machines and Octopus card top-up machines in the unpaid area of the concourse in Citylink Plaza (October 2017)

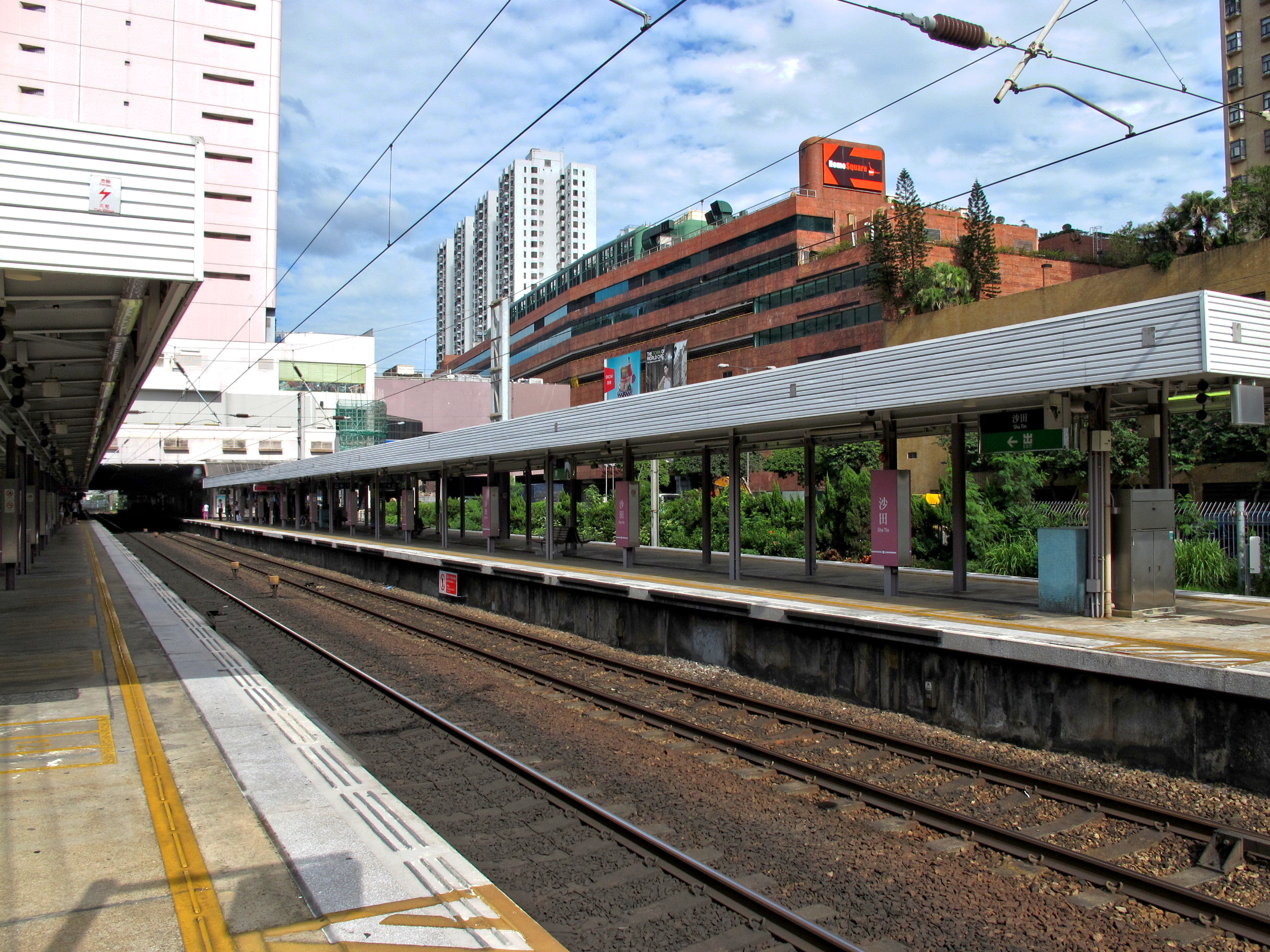
Platform 2 of Sha Tin station (2011)

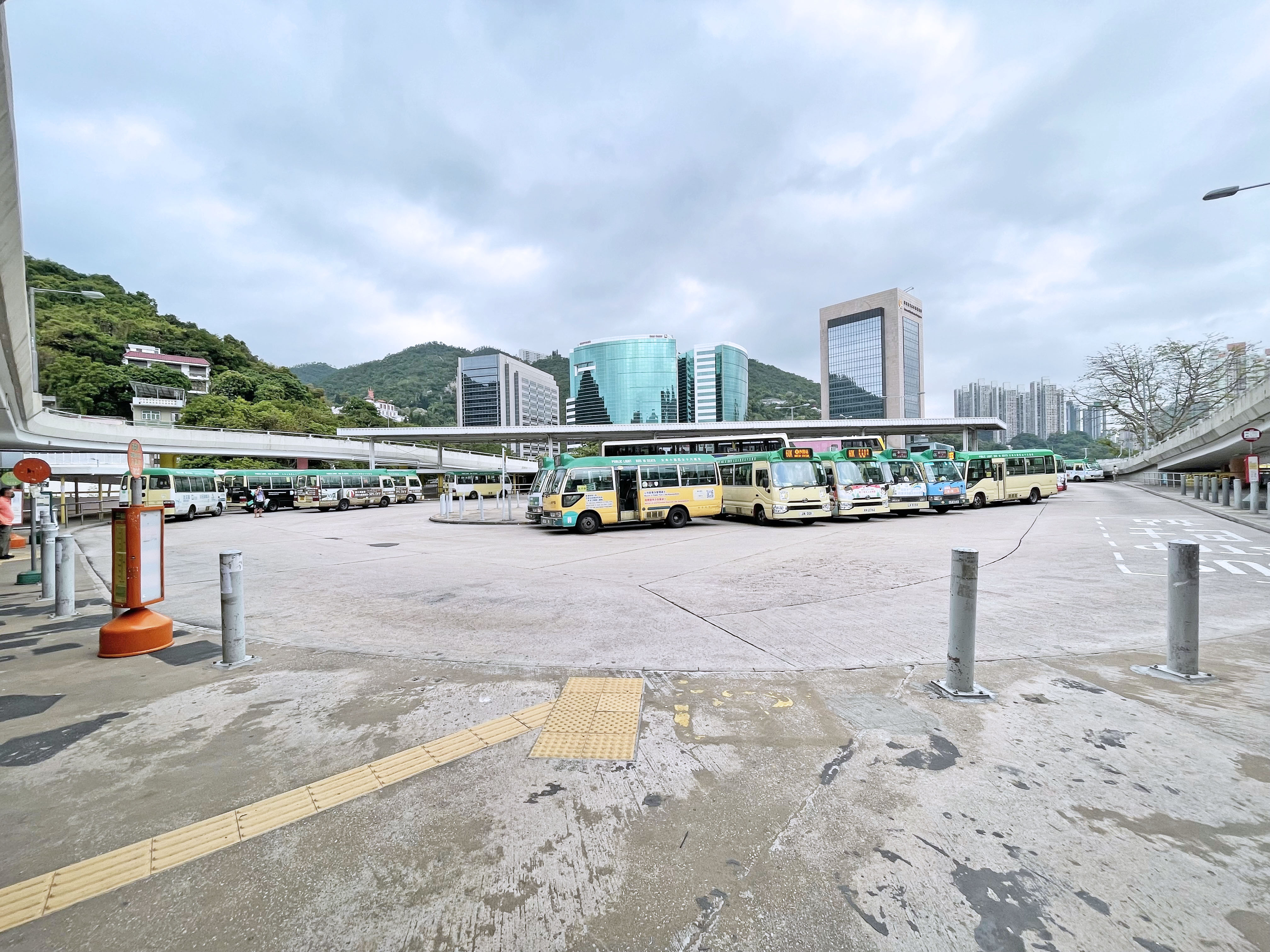
Public Transport Interchange outside Exit B (2022)

== Exits ==
- A1: Pai Tau Street, public transport interchange
- A2: Citylink Plaza
- A3: New Town Plaza
- A4: Pai Tau Village
- B: Pai Tau Street, Pai Tau Village, public transport interchange
