= University station (MTR) =

MTR station in the New Territories, Hong Kong

University 大學
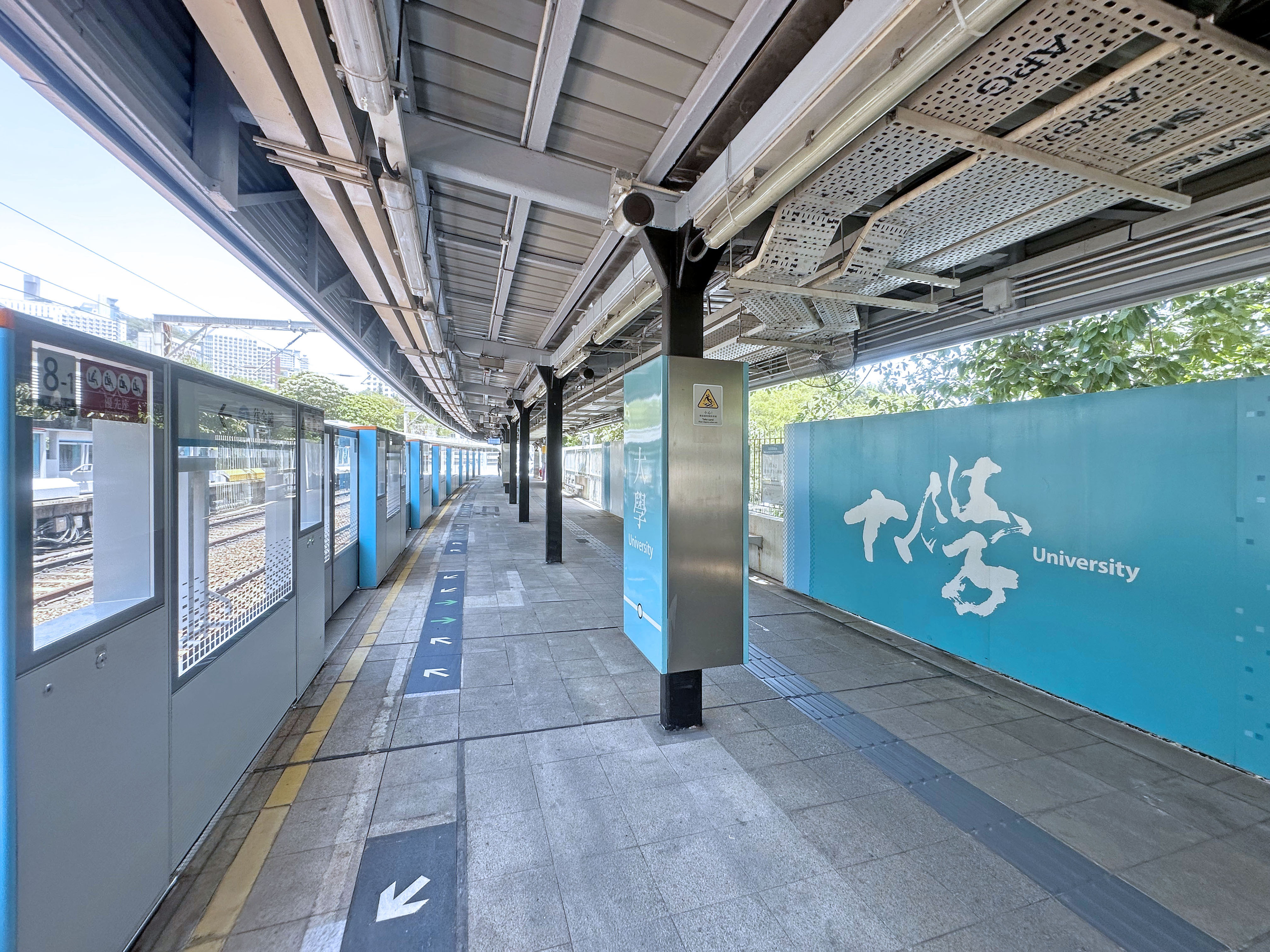
- Platform 2

General information
- Location: Chak Cheung Street, Ma Liu Shui; Sha Tin District, Hong Kong
- Coordinates: 22°24′48″N 114°12′37″E
- System: MTR rapid transit station
- Owner: KCR Corporation
- Operator: MTR Corporation
- Line: East Rail line
- Platforms: 2 (2 side platforms)
- Tracks: 2
- Connections: Bus, minibus; Kai-to

Construction
- Structure type: At-grade
- Platform levels: 1
- Accessible: Yes

Other information
- Station code: UNI

History
- Opened: 24 September 1956; 69 years ago
- Electrified: 2 May 1983; 43 years ago

Services
Preceding station	MTR	Following station
Fo Tan towards Admiralty	East Rail line	Tai Po Market towards Lo Wu or Lok Ma Chau
Racecourse towards Admiralty	East Rail line Race days only	Tai Po Market towards Lo Wu or Lok Ma Chau

Former services
Preceding station	KCR	Following station
Sha Tin towards Kowloon	KCR British section	Tai Po Kau towards Lo Wu
Track layout
Location
- Location within MTR

University station
- Chinese: 大學
- Cantonese Yale: Daaih hohk
- Literal meaning: University
Transcriptions
Standard Mandarin
- Hanyu Pinyin: Dàxué
Yue: Cantonese
- Yale Romanization: Daaih hohk
- Jyutping: daai^{6} hok^{6}

University station (named Ma Liu Shui station until 11 December 1965) is an MTR station located near the Chinese University of Hong Kong in Ma Liu Shui. It is located between Tai Po Market and Fo Tan/Racecourse stations on the East Rail line. This station was the first postwar station to open on the line, and has the most curved track of any MTR station. Its livery is cyan.

== History ==
=== Early history ===
Construction of the station, initially named Ma Liu Shui after the locality in which it is situated, began in January 1955. It was completed in August 1955. There had been a longstanding need to build a passing place along the stretch of track between Tai Po and Sha Tin, as the railway was only single-track at that time, and it was convenient to build a station at the same time to serve the new Chung Chi College.

The new station comprised "a single storeyed station building, a flush latrine, 1,250 linear feet of platforms and a loop line of 1,900 linear feet". The opening was delayed due to the late arrival of signalling equipment ordered through the Crown Agents.

The station finally came into operation on 24 September 1956, at that time served by three up-trains and three down-trains daily. Though the Chinese University of Hong Kong was not founded until 1963, the adjacent Chung Chi College would become part of the new university in 1963, and would form the basis of CUHK's campus. The station was given its present name on 1 January 1967. In 1983, its tracks were electrified along with the rest of the KCR East Rail .

A Chinese goods wagon derailed north of the station at around 2:00 p.m. on 4 June 1988. Nobody was injured, but the derailment led to thousands being stranded at University, Tai Po Market, and Fo Tan stations, leading to an "almost hysterical scramble for road transport". At 5:00 p.m. a lorry overturned in the northbound carriageway of the Lion Rock Tunnel. Together, the accidents caused a "great stoppage" in Kowloon and the eastern New Territories, leading to anger and fights at massive queues for taxi ranks and bus stations. The Police Tactical Unit was dispatched to University station.

=== 2000 expansion ===
Originally, the station was the smallest in the system. In the early 1990s, the new town of Ma On Shan was developed on the other side of Tolo Harbour, and it seemed inefficient to make residents there go all the way to Sha Tin to catch a train. Therefore, university station was expanded at a cost of $72.4 million, becoming an important interchange between buses and minibuses from Ma On Shan and the East Rail line. Construction began in late 1998 and the expanded station, designed by Leigh & Orange, was officially opened in October 2000. The total floor area of the station concourses increased from 800 square metres to 2,000 square metres. Four years later, in December 2004, the Ma On Shan rail opened to provide Ma On Shan with direct railway service. As a consequence, University station's importance to residents of Ma On Shan was strongly diminished.

=== New station entrance ===
A new exit D opened at the north end of the station in 2012 to serve several newly opened teaching buildings nearby. The structure was awarded LEED silver precertification for features such as natural daytime lighting, rainwater storage for irrigation, natural ventilation, and furniture made from recycled railway sleepers. The entrance is unusual on the MTR system in that it opens directly onto a platform rather than a concourse level, meaning that it is convenient only for those using northbound trains because there is no way to cross the tracks at that area. To access southbound trains from exit D, passengers must walk the length of the platform to cross the tracks using the exit A/B concourse.

== Safety ==
The platform is built along a curve, causing gaps of a range of different sizes to exist while the trains are lined up to the platform. The KCRC responded to these complaints by assuring passengers that they will install plates on the side of platforms to reduce the gap, though this has not been done.

After two incidents of children falling onto the tracks at University station in 1985, the issue was discussed in the Legislative Council. The Secretary for Transport asserted that the gaps were within "international safety limits", and that the gap could not be narrowed due to the curvature of the station as well as the "rather wider bodies" of the Chinese through trains which run through the station daily. A man who fractured his leg boarding a train at the station in 2008 asserted that he fell into a gap of about 35 cm, while the MTR claimed it was only 22 cm at the relevant section of platform.

Today, the station is one of three on the network marked with special signage noting the "gap black spots". The platform edge is outfitted with flashing neon lighting and "小心空隙" (mind the gap) decals, and typically there are several staff on duty on the platform. Constructions of platform edge doors have been completed on 11 May 2025.

== Station layout ==
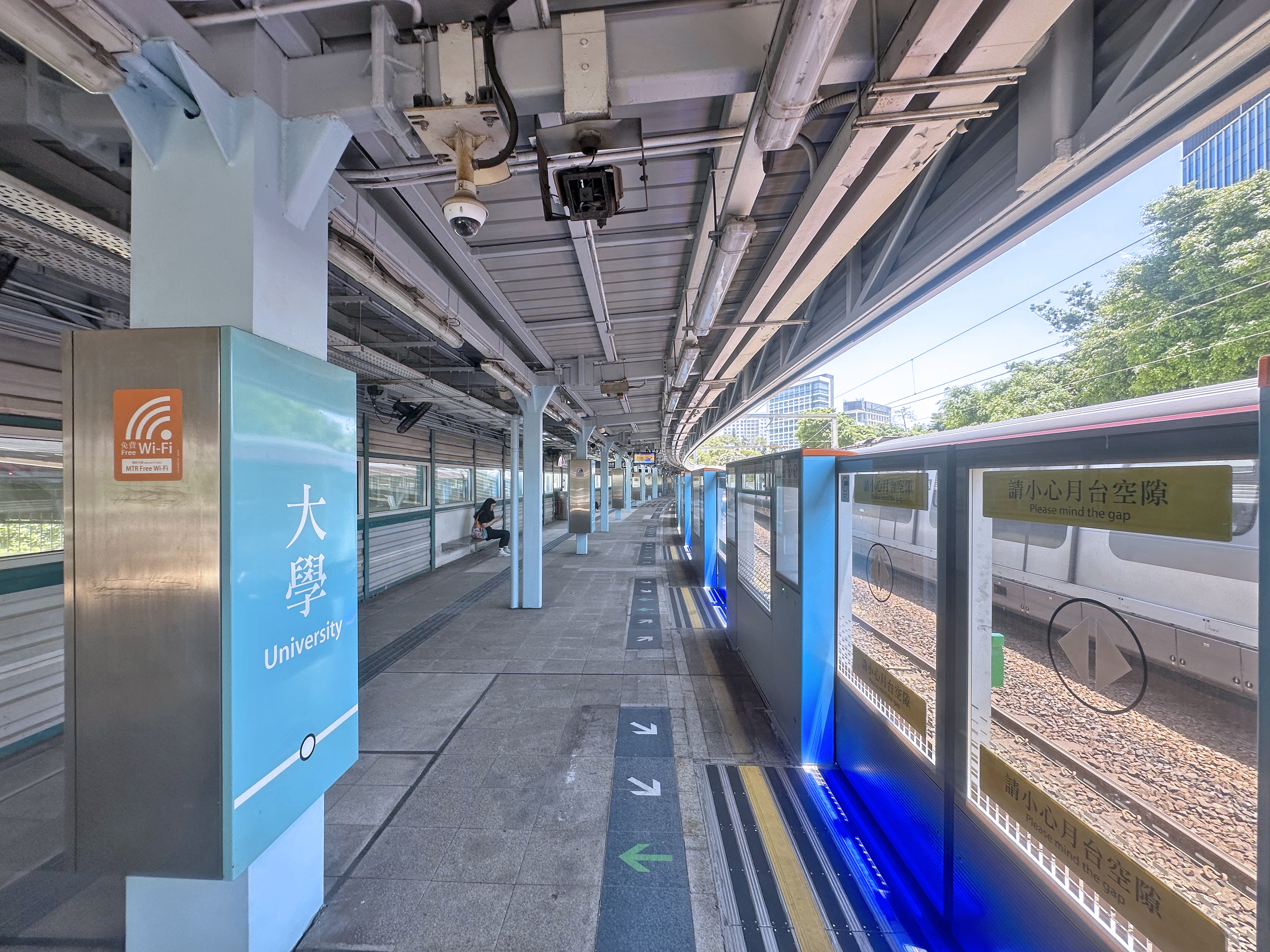
Platform 1

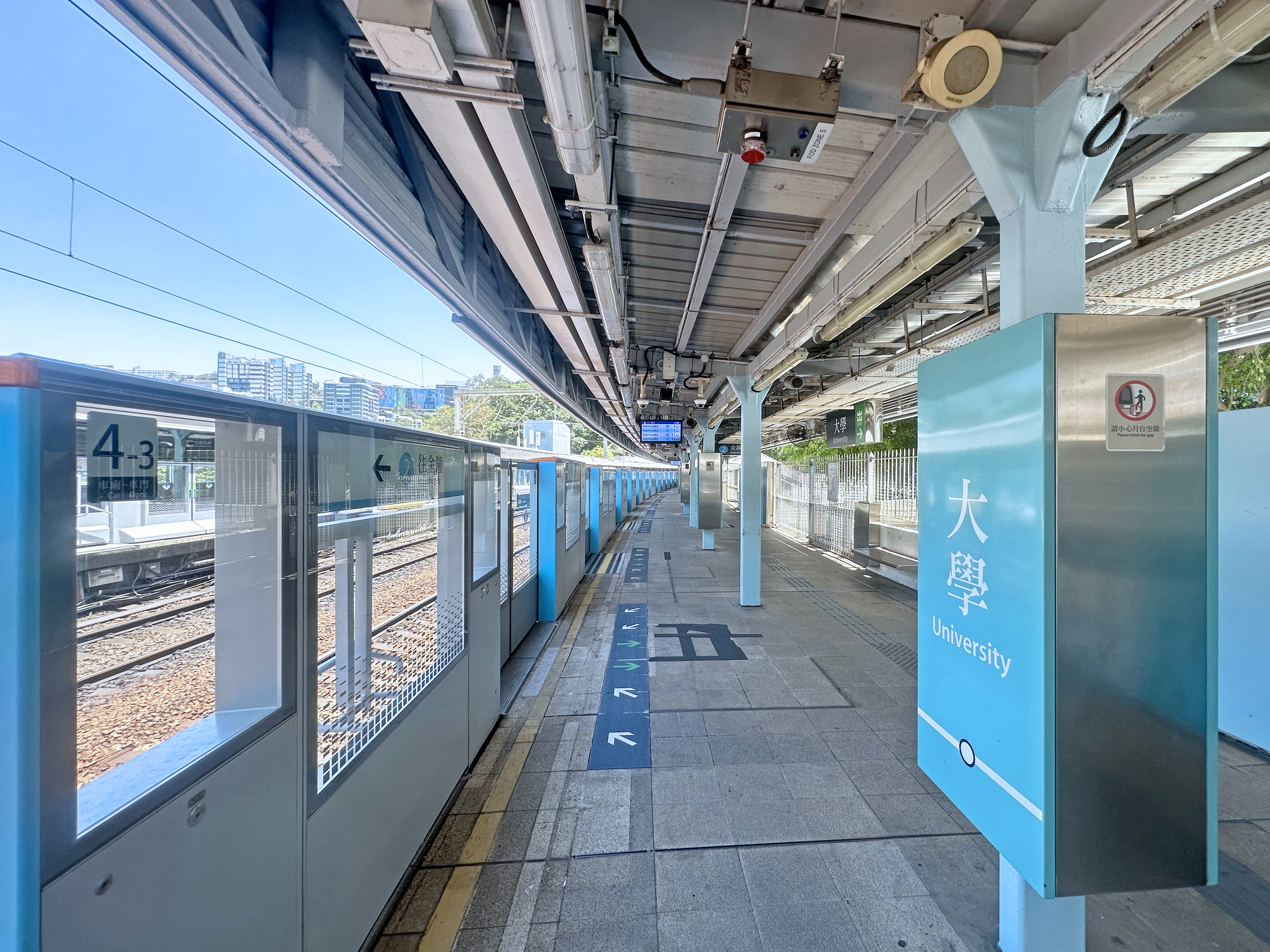
Platform 2

P Platforms	West Concourse	Exit C, D, Customer Service, CUHK shuttle bus terminus
P Platforms	Side platform, doors will open on the left
P Platforms	Platform 1	East Rail line towards Lo Wu or Lok Ma Chau (Tai Po Market) →
P Platforms	Platform 2	← East Rail line towards Admiralty (Racecourse on race days, Fo Tan all times)
P Platforms	Side platform, doors will open on the left
C Concourse (Ground)	East Concourse	Exit A, B, Customer Service, transport interchange, washrooms
C Concourse (Ground)	East Concourse	Shops, vending machines, automatic teller machines (HSBC)
C Concourse (Ground)	Passageway	Passageway to both platforms

== Entrances/exits ==
- A: The Chinese University of Hong Kong
- B: Chak Cheung Street, public transport interchange
- C: The Chinese University of Hong Kong
- D: The Chinese University of Hong Kong, Teaching Complex
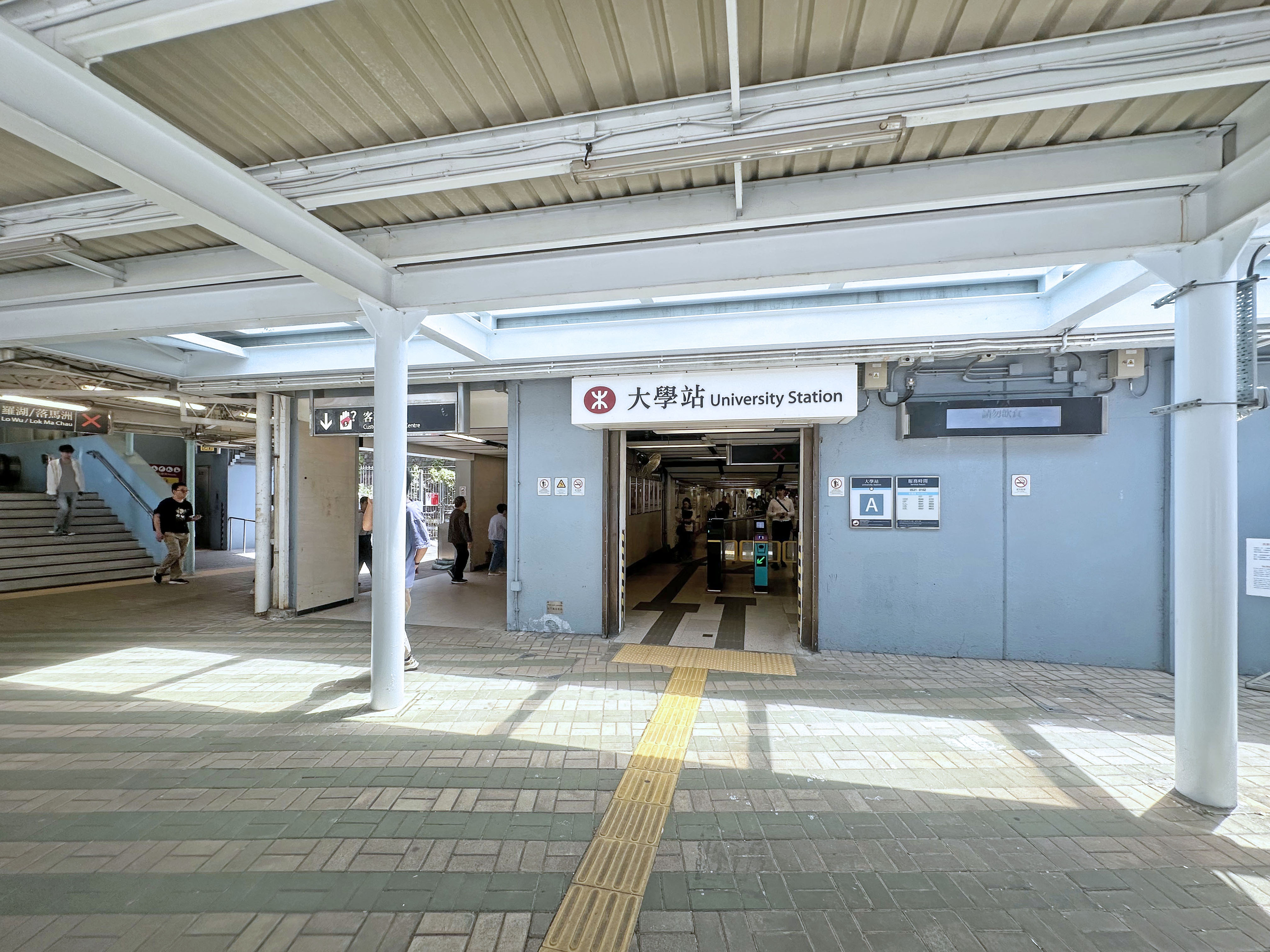
Exit A

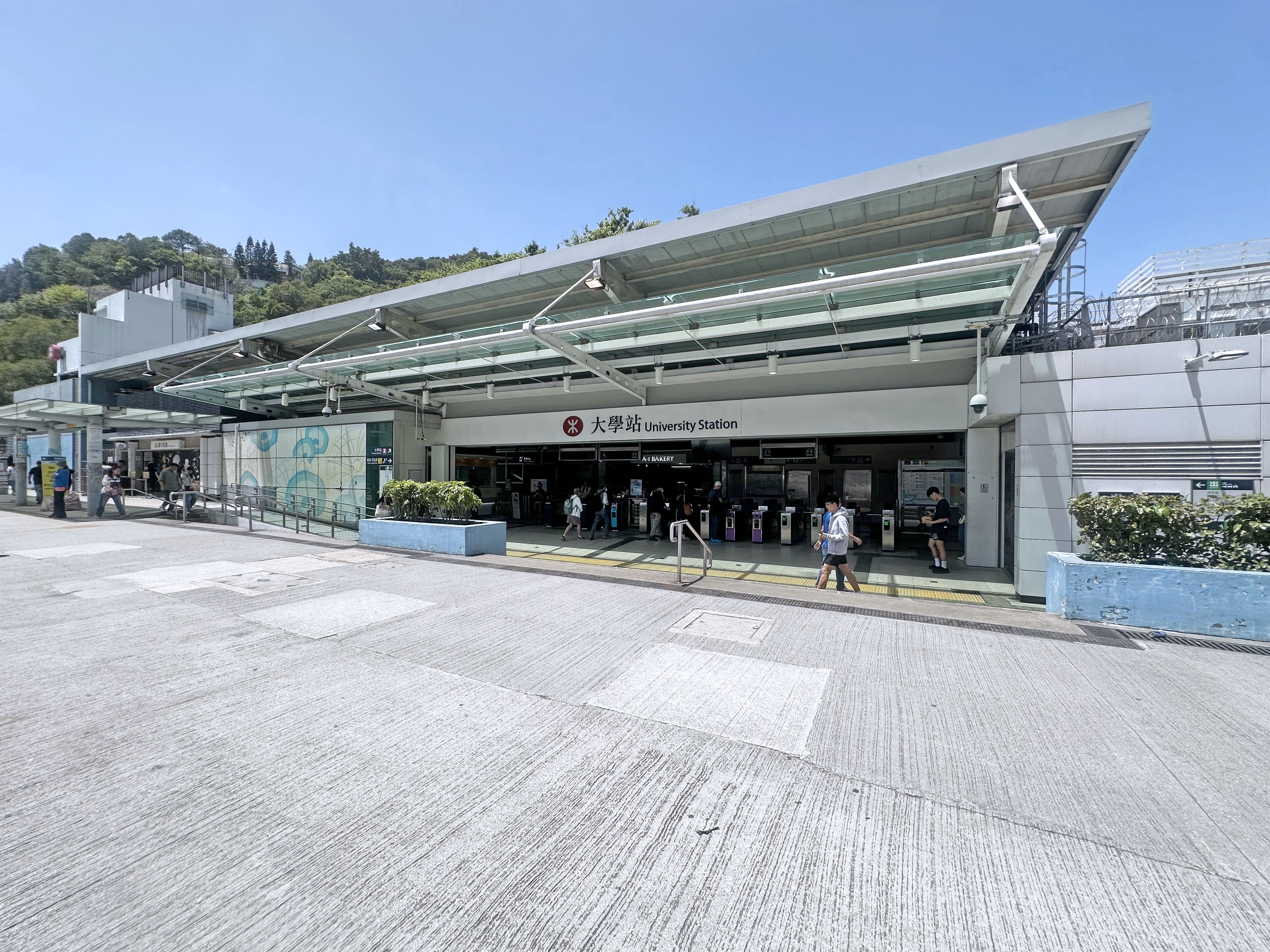
Exit B

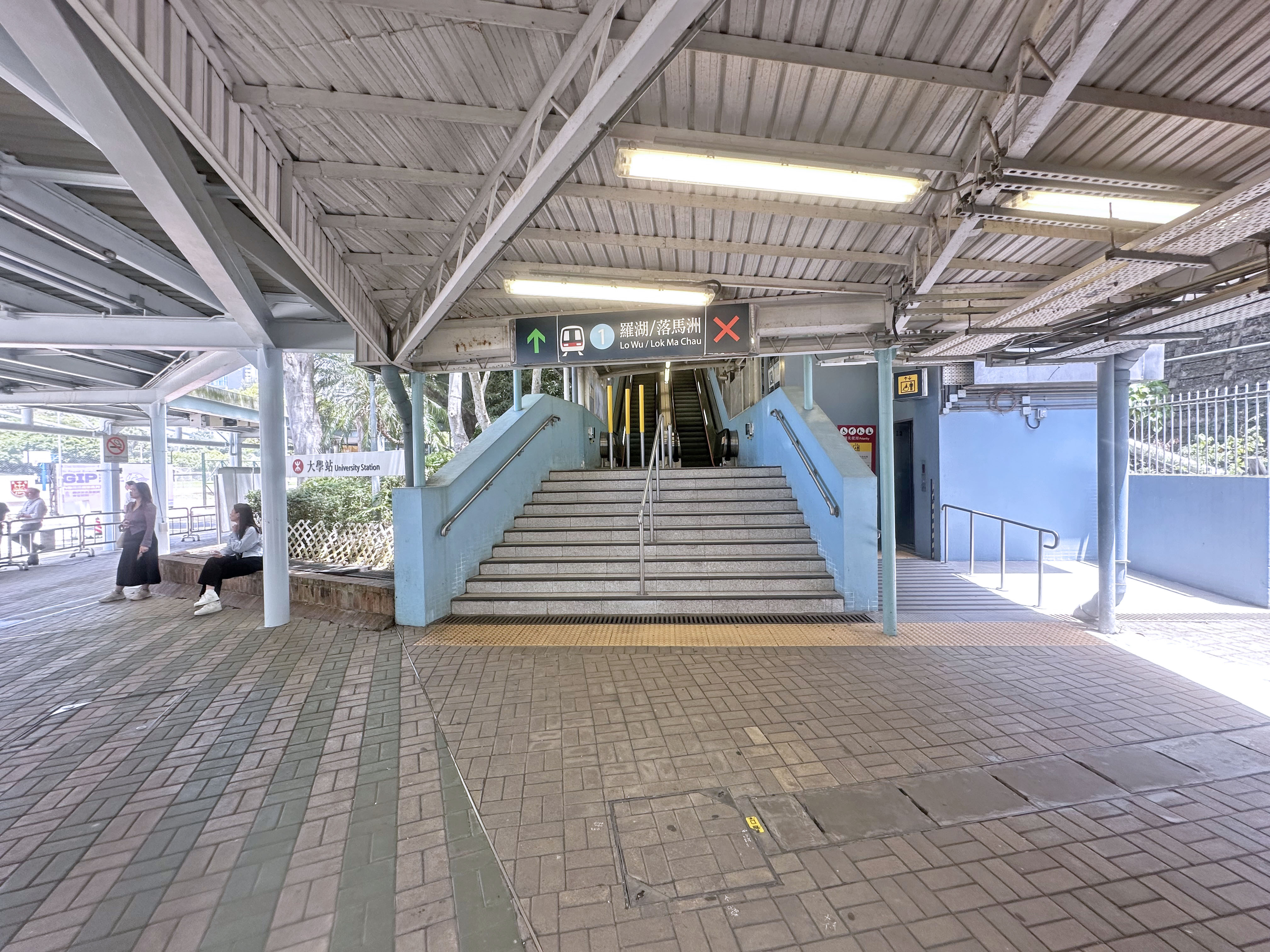
Exit C

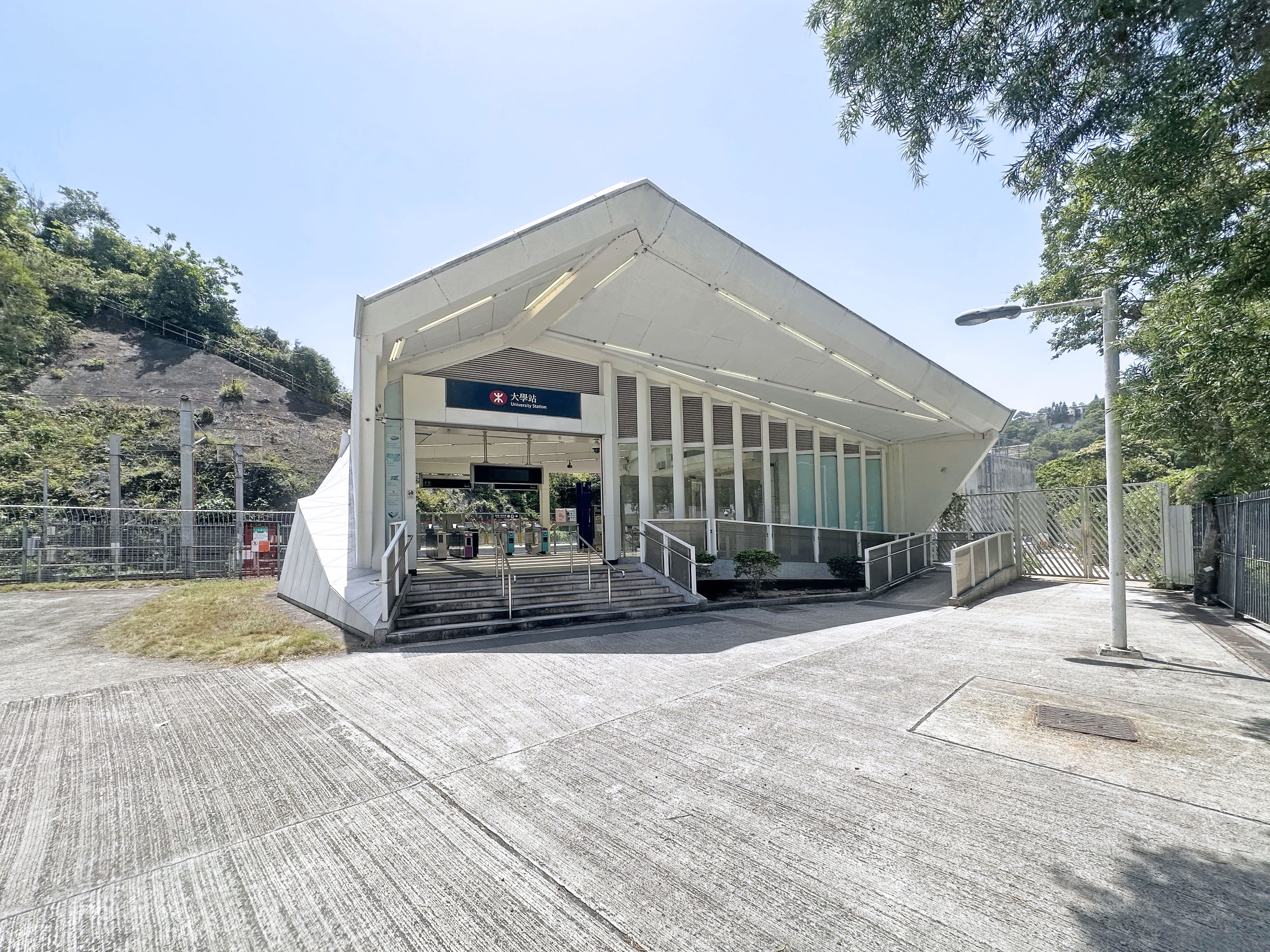
Exit D
