= Citylink Plaza =

Building in Sha Tin, Hong Kong

Coordinates: 22.3826°N 114.1874°E

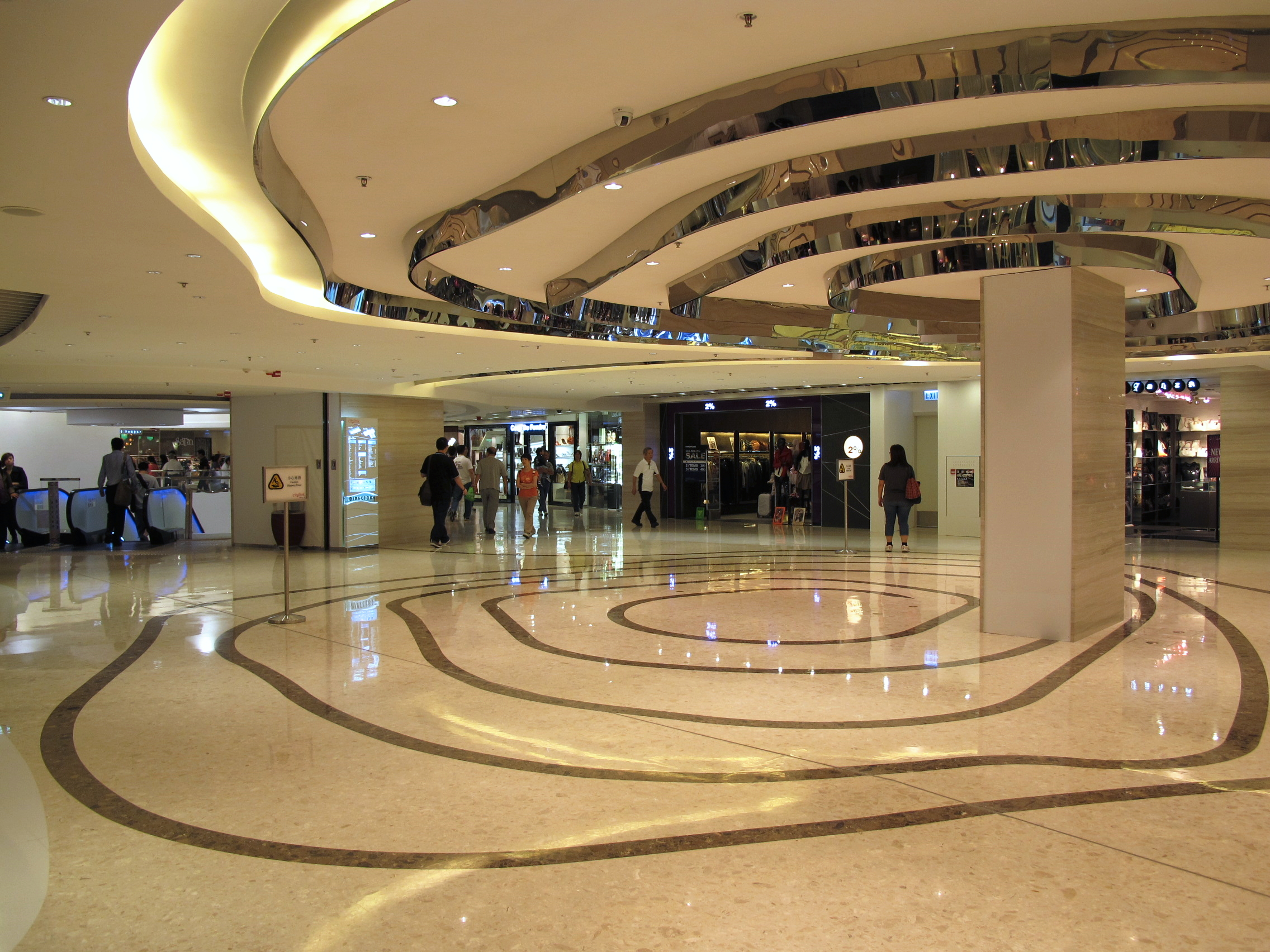
- The shopping centre of the Citylink Plaza, after renovation in 2011
- Traditional Chinese: 連城廣場
Transcriptions
Standard Mandarin
- Hanyu Pinyin: Liánchéng Guángchǎng
Yue: Cantonese
- Yale Romanization: lin4 sing4 gwong2 cheung4
- Jyutping: lin4 sing4 gwong2 coeng4

Citylink Plaza is a building that stands above Sha Tin station on the MTR East Rail line in Hong Kong. It was developed and is owned by the Kowloon-Canton Railway Corporation (KCRC). The building, as well as the railway station, is connected to New Town Plaza, which is one of the largest shopping centres in Sha Tin District.

== History ==
The building originally housed the headquarters of the KCRC and some offices of the Hong Kong Government. It was called the KCR House (九廣鐵路大廈) when it opened in 1983. The shopping centre was called Railway Mall and was renamed Citylink Plaza after it was renovated at the end of 1993. The Hong Kong Government built a separate building near Grand Central Plaza to house the government offices, and the headquarters of the KCRC had moved to a new building next to Fo Tan station on the MTR East Rail line. The original building was refurbished and was converted into a shopping centre and offices.

== Gallery ==
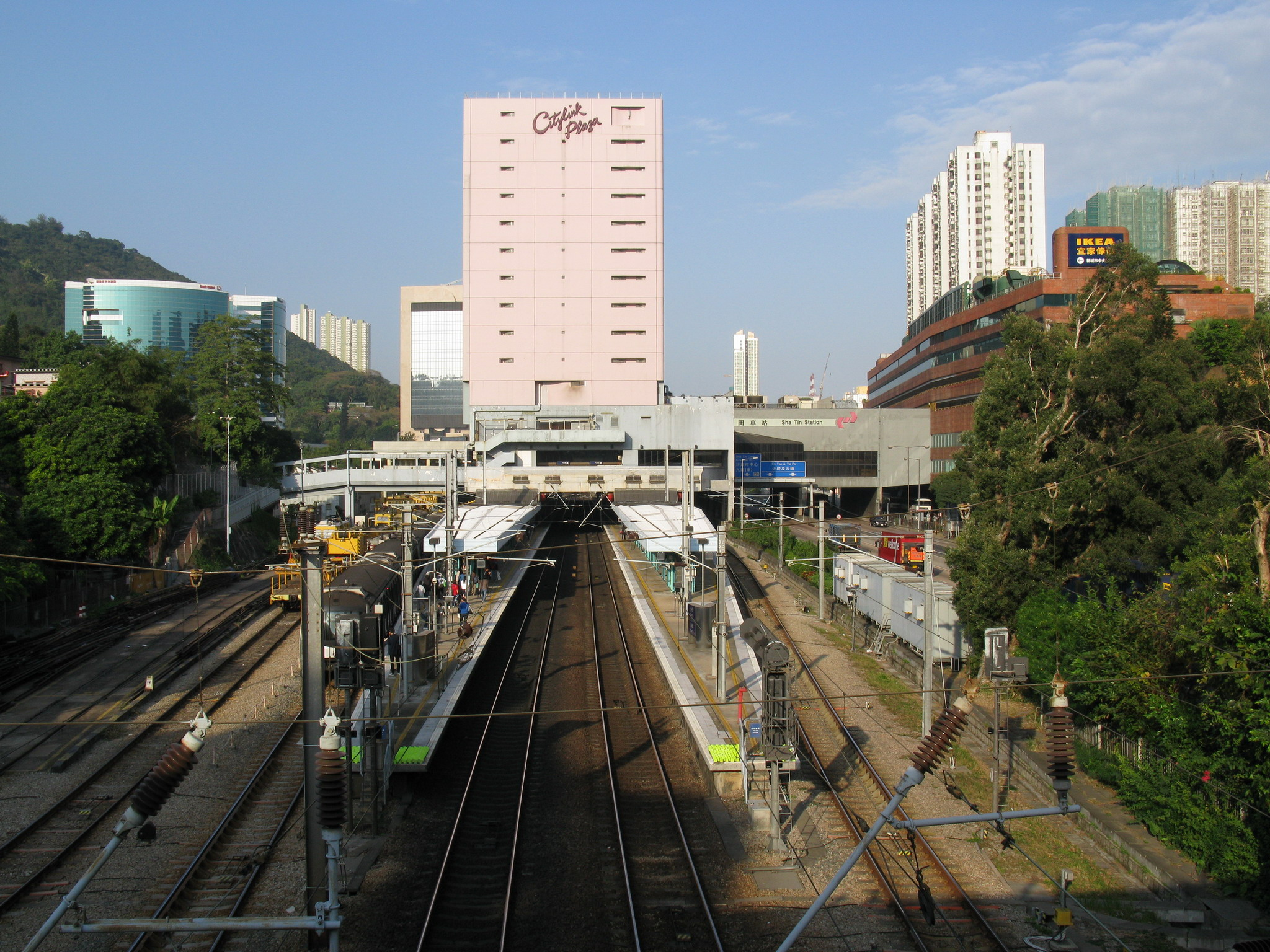
Citylink Plaza in 2007

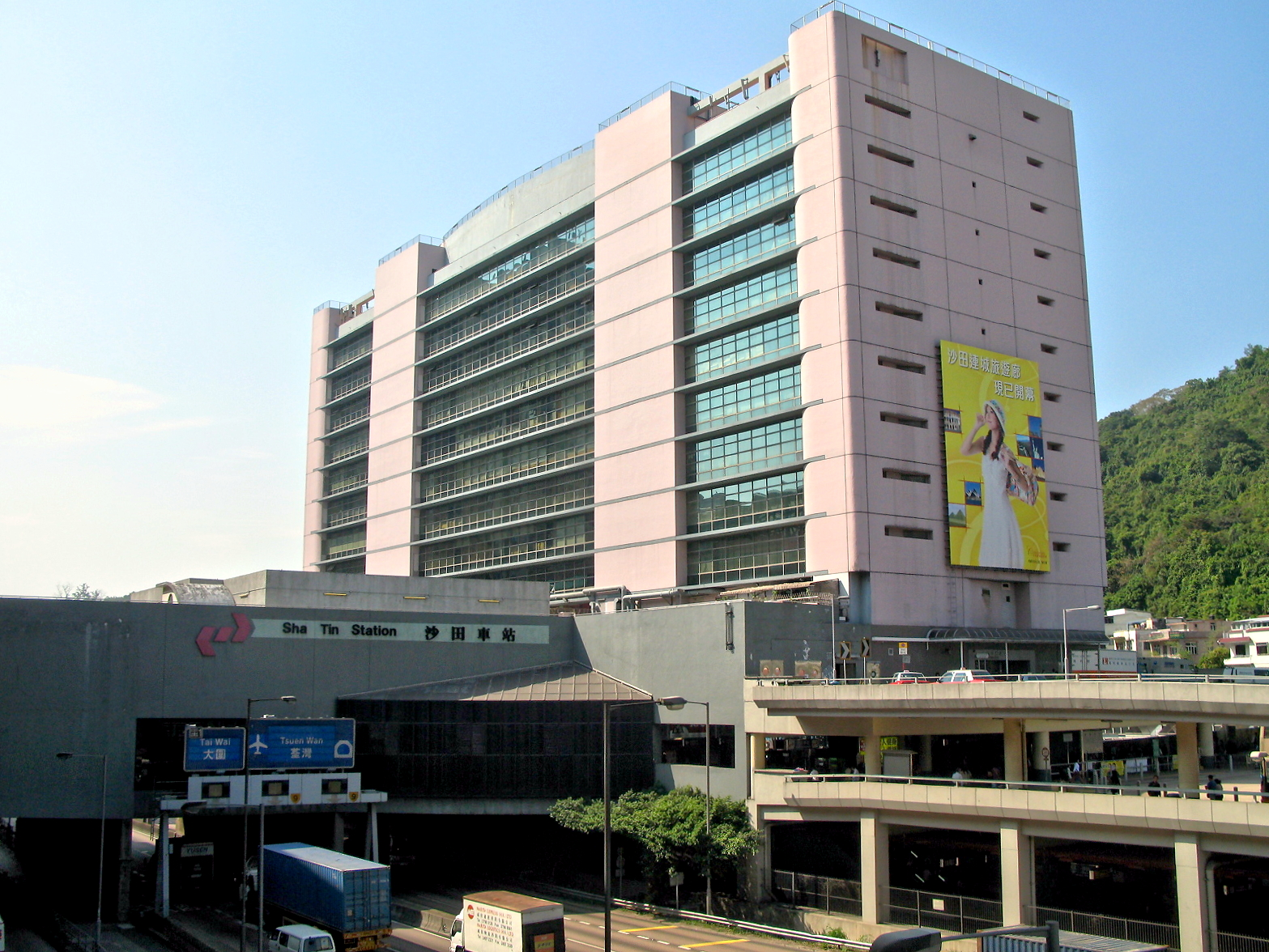
Citylink Plaza in 2007

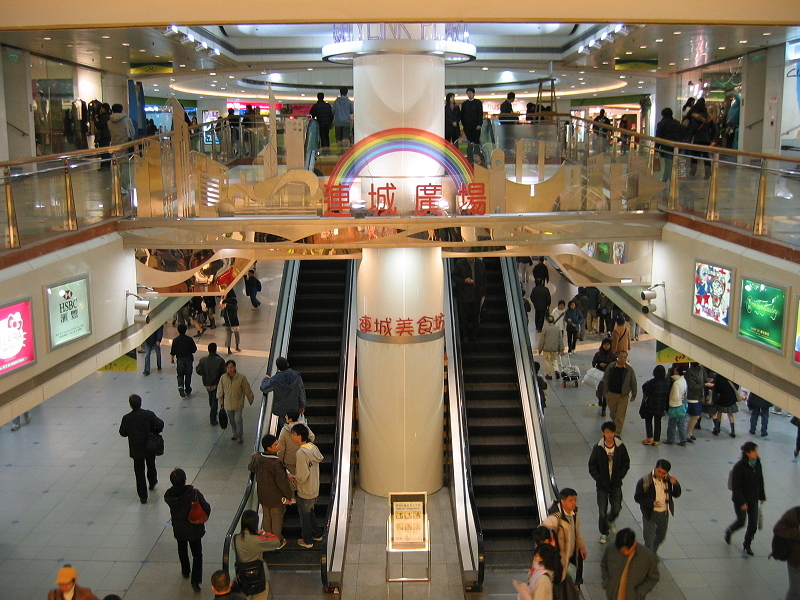
The shopping centre of the Citylink Plaza, before its 2010 renovation

== See also ==
- List of shopping centres in Hong Kong
