= Racecourse station (MTR) =

MTR station in the New Territories, Hong Kong

Racecourse 馬場
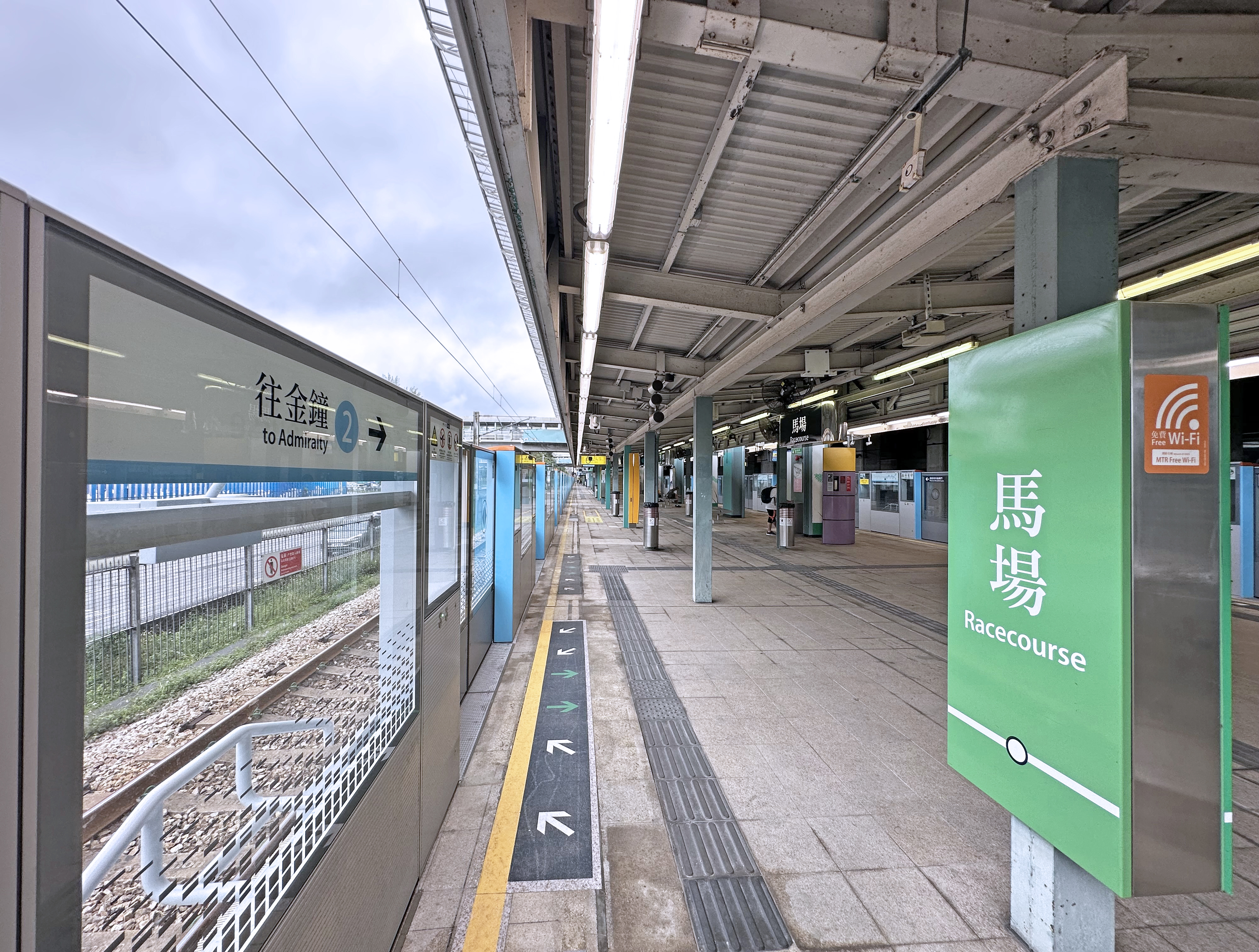
- Platform 2

Chinese name
- Traditional Chinese: 馬場
- Simplified Chinese: 马场
- Jyutping: maa^{5} coeng^{4}
- Hanyu Pinyin: Máchǎng
- Literal meaning: horse field
Transcriptions
Standard Mandarin
- Hanyu Pinyin: Máchǎng
Yue: Cantonese
- Yale Romanization: Máhchèung
- IPA: [ma˩˧.tsʰœŋ˩]
- Jyutping: maa^{5} coeng^{4}

General information
- Location: Sha Tin Racecourse, Tai Po Road — Sha Tin, Fo Tan; Sha Tin District, Hong Kong
- Coordinates: 22°24′01″N 114°12′10″E
- System: MTR rapid transit station
- Owner: KCR Corporation
- Operator: MTR Corporation
- Line: East Rail line
- Platforms: 2 (1 island platform)
- Tracks: 2
- Connections: Sha Tin Racecourse; Bus, minibus

Construction
- Structure type: At-grade
- Accessible: Yes

Other information
- Station code: RAC

History
- Opened: 7 October 1978; 47 years ago (original station building)
- Rebuilt: 1 October 1985; 40 years ago

Services
Preceding station	MTR	Following station
Sha Tin towards Admiralty	East Rail line Race days only	University towards Lo Wu or Lok Ma Chau
Track layout
Location
- Location within MTR

Racecourse (Chinese: 馬場; Jyutping: maa^{5} coeng^{4}; Cantonese Yale: Máhchèung) is a station on the East Rail line of Hong Kong. It was opened on 1 October 1985 and is only used on race days and special days held in the Sha Tin Racecourse. There are single journey tickets to the station available separately. It is located between Sha Tin and University stations along the East Rail line's Racecourse branch, and is situated parallel to Fo Tan along the mainline. Its livery is spring green.

== History ==
Racecourse station originally opened along with the eponymous racecourse on 7 October 1978. The current Racecourse station opened on 1 October 1985, in time to serve a new grandstand at the racecourse. A renovation of the station was completed in 1996. In 2023, Racecourse was the first station on the East Rail line to have platform screen gates installed, as part of a plan to construct platform screen gates at 13 stations on the line.

== Station layout ==
Racecourse has one island platform. Unlike other MTR stations, trains can arrive at either platform regardless of direction, so passengers need to follow directions of MTR staff and the electronic displays for the direction of trains. Both directions usually have a headway of 10–15 minutes.

The station does not have escalators or lifts. Wheelchair users can only use a stair lift to access the station after calling a member of staff for assistance.

C	Concourse	Exits/Entrances, Customer Service
C	Footbridges	To Sha Tin Racecourse
P Platforms	Depot tracks	No passenger service
P Platforms	Platform 1	← East Rail line towards Admiralty (Sha Tin); East Rail line towards Lo Wu or Lok Ma Chau (University) →
P Platforms	Island platform, doors will open on the left or right
P Platforms	Platform 2	← East Rail line towards Admiralty (Sha Tin); East Rail line towards Lo Wu/Lok Ma Chau (University) →

== Entrances/Exits ==
- A: Racecourse Grandstand (Gate 1 & 2)
- B: Racecourse Grandstand (Gate 3 & 4)
- C: Racecourse Grandstand (Gate 5 & 6)

There are three footbridges that link the platform to the station concourse near the grandstand. There are no other entrances to access the station.

== Gallery ==
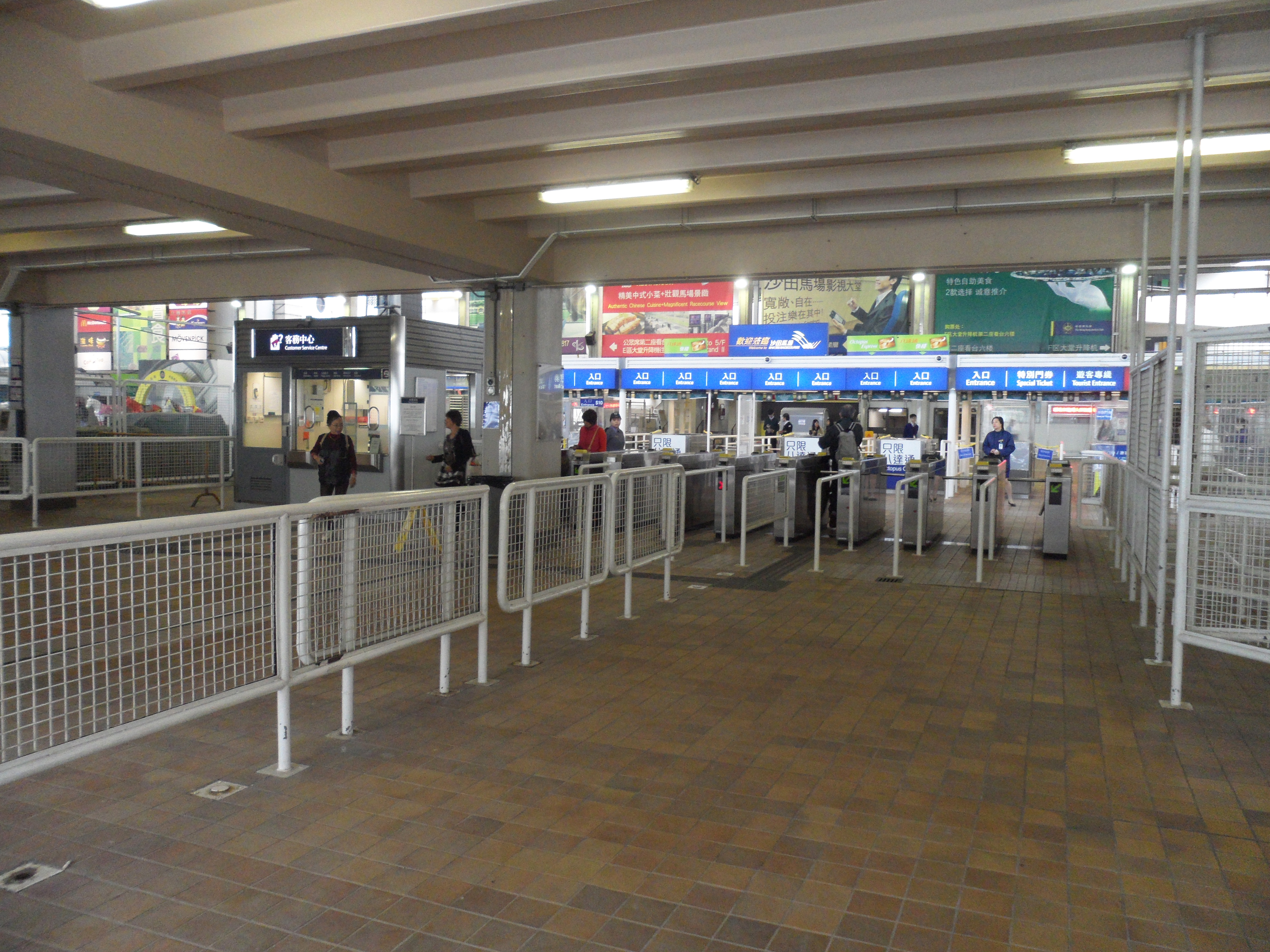
Station entrance (Faregates)

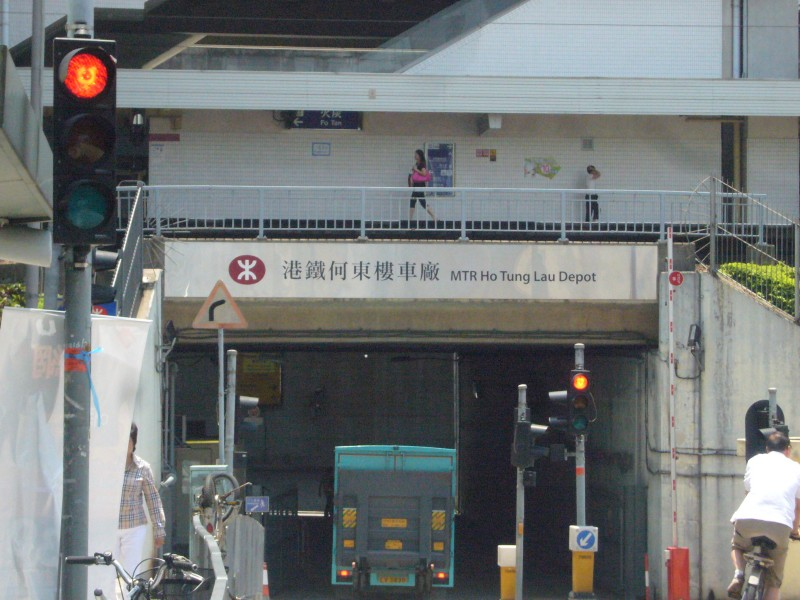
Entrance to MTR Ho Tung Lau Depot

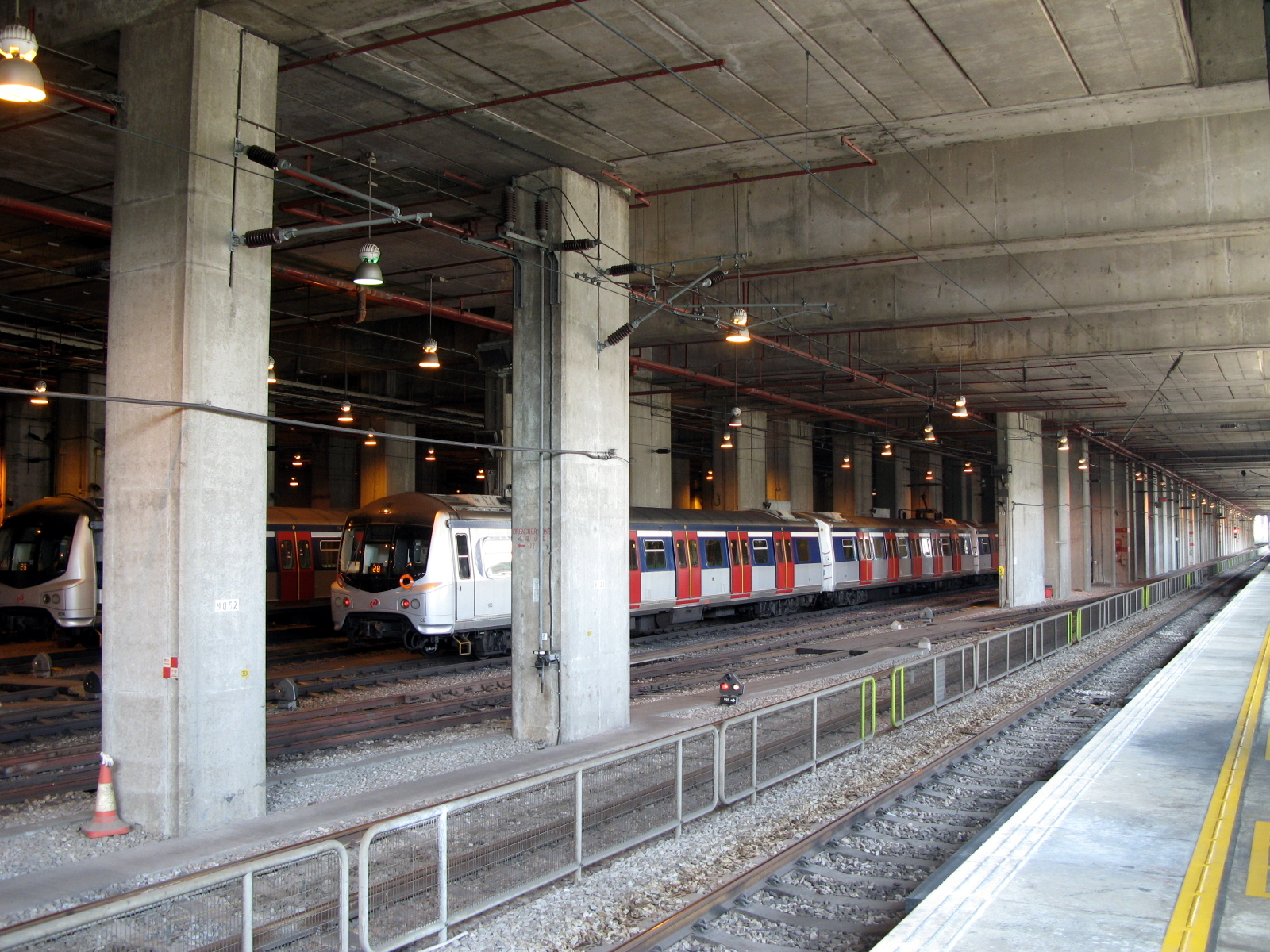
Inside MTR Ho Tung Lau Depot

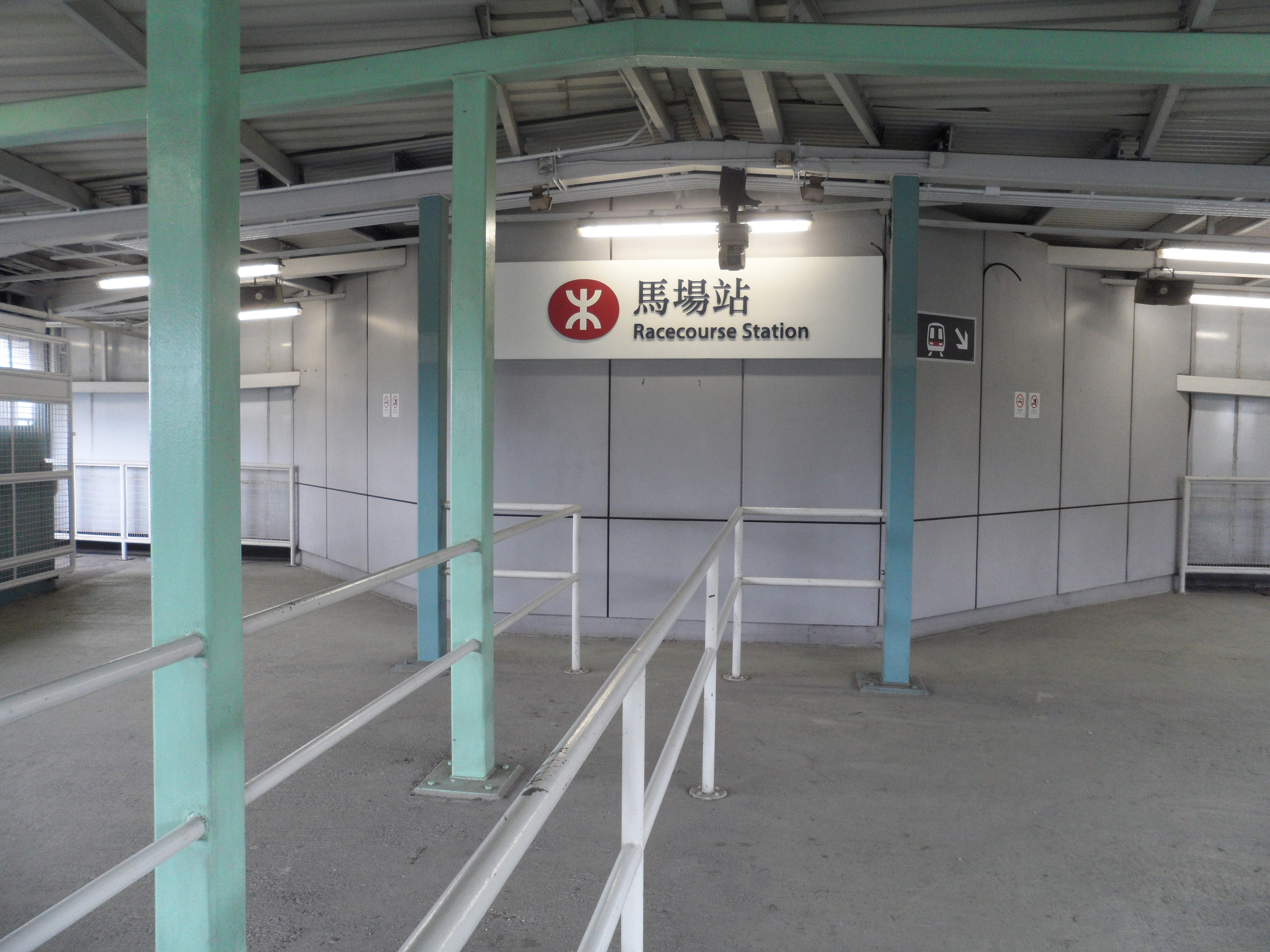
Station entrance (towards the platform)

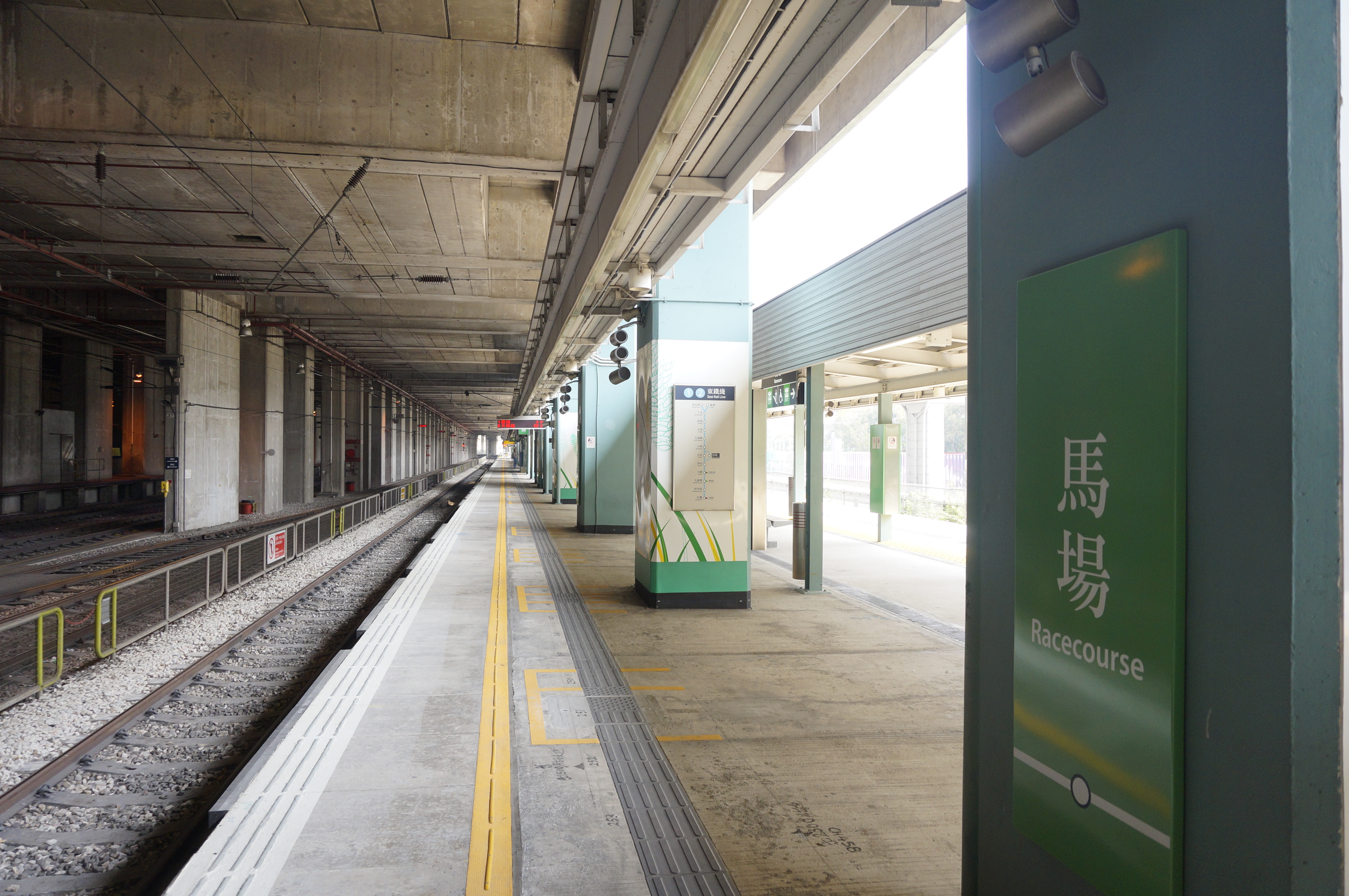
Platform 1
