= Tai Po Market station =

MTR station in the New Territories, Hong Kong

Tai Po Market 大埔墟
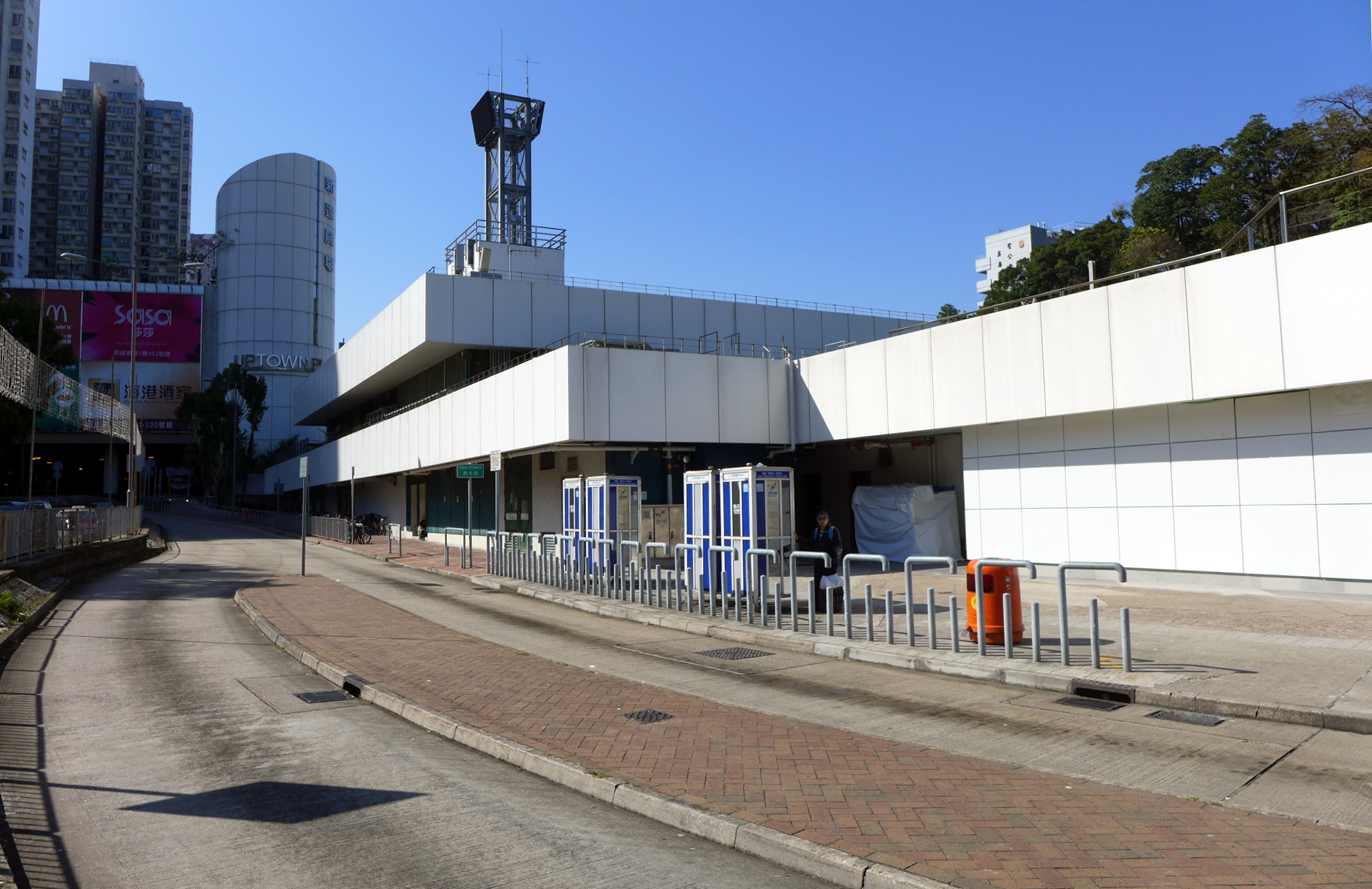
- Station exterior

General information
- Location: Nga Wan Road, Tai Po; Tai Po District, Hong Kong
- Coordinates: 22°26′41″N 114°10′14″E
- System: MTR rapid transit station
- Owner: KCR Corporation
- Operator: MTR Corporation
- Line: East Rail line
- Platforms: 4 (2 island platforms)
- Tracks: 3
- Connections: Hong Kong Railway Museum; Bus, minibus

Construction
- Structure type: At-grade
- Platform levels: 1
- Accessible: Yes

Other information
- Station code: TAP

History
- Opened: 1 October 1910; 116 years ago
- Rebuilt: 7 April 1983; 43 years ago
- Electrified: 2 May 1983; 43 years ago

Key dates
- 1910: Station opened
- 1913: Old station building erected
- 1983: Station is relocated to its current location; old station building closed
- 1985: Old station building converted to the Hong Kong Railway Museum

Services
| Preceding station | MTR | Following station |
|---|---|---|
| University towards Admiralty | East Rail line | Tai Wo towards Lo Wu or Lok Ma Chau |
| University towards Admiralty | East Rail line Late night trains | Terminus |
Track layout
Location
- Location within MTR

Tai Po Market station
- Chinese: 大埔墟
- Jyutping: daai^{6} bou^{3} heoi^{1}
- Literal meaning: Greatport Market
Transcriptions
Standard Mandarin
- Hanyu Pinyin: Dàbǔxū
Yue: Cantonese
- Yale Romanization: Daaih bou hēui
- Jyutping: daai^{6} bou^{3} heoi^{1}
- IPA: [taj˨pɔw˧hɵɥ˥]

Tai Po Market (Chinese: 大埔墟; Cantonese Yale: Daaih bou hēui; pronounced: [taj˨pɔw˧.hɵɥ˥]) is an MTR station on the East Rail line in the New Territories, Hong Kong. Located between Flagstaff Hill and Wan Tau Tong Estate in Tai Po, and adjacent to the eponymous market town, the station has three tracks and four platforms. Platform 1 is for northbound trains to border crossing stations at Lo Wu and Lok Ma Chau and platform 4 is for southbound trains to Admiralty, Kowloon while platforms 2 and 3 use the same track and is reserved for peak hour traffic. Its livery is aster purple.

== History ==
Between 1910 and 1982, the old Tai Po Market station located within the Tai Po Market proper served the passengers of Tai Po. The old station is a 10-minute walk from the current one. During the electrification of the Kowloon–Canton Railway (British Section) (now known as the East Rail line), the station was relocated to its current location on 7 April 1983, while the old station building became a part of the Hong Kong Railway Museum. On 2 May the same year, the KCR was electrified to Tai Po Market; the full line was electrified on 15 July 1983.

The station went under a major renovation which was completed in 2008. During the renovation, it remained open though most of the retail outlets were closed.

The construction of platform screen gates at Tai Po Market station began in 2023. The project was completed in 2024 as part of a program to add platform screen gates to 13 stations on the East Rail line.

== Station layout ==
| P Platforms | Platform 1 | East Rail line towards Lo Wu or Lok Ma Chau (Tai Wo) → |
| P Platforms | Island platform, doors will open on the left, right |
| P Platforms | Platform; 2 ↑ / 3 ↓ | East Rail line towards Lo Wu or Lok Ma Chau (Tai Wo) → East Rail line termination platform → ← East Rail line towards Admiralty (University) |
| P Platforms | Island platform, doors will open on the left, right |
| P Platforms | Platform 4 | ← East Rail line towards Admiralty (University) |
| C Concourse (Ground) | Concourse | Tickets/fare adjustment, shops, toilets, vending machines, ATMs |
| C Concourse (Ground) | Subway | Subway to Uptown Plaza, Nga Wan Road, Wan Tau Kok Playground |

The station consists of two island platforms, with platforms 2 and 3 sharing the same centre track. This centre track serves as the terminus of some trains during the day, and the departure of some extra trains southbound during morning peak hours. Northbound trains that arrive here after 11 p.m. use the centre track instead, as Platform 1 is reserved for late night trains that terminate at Tai Po Market instead of continuing towards Lo Wu or Lok Ma Chau.

== Exits ==
- A: Uptown Plaza
  - A1: Uptown Plaza
  - A2: Tat Wan Road, Wan Tau Kok, American School Hong Kong
  - A3: Public transport interchange (Nga Wan Road)
- B: Kwong Fuk Estate
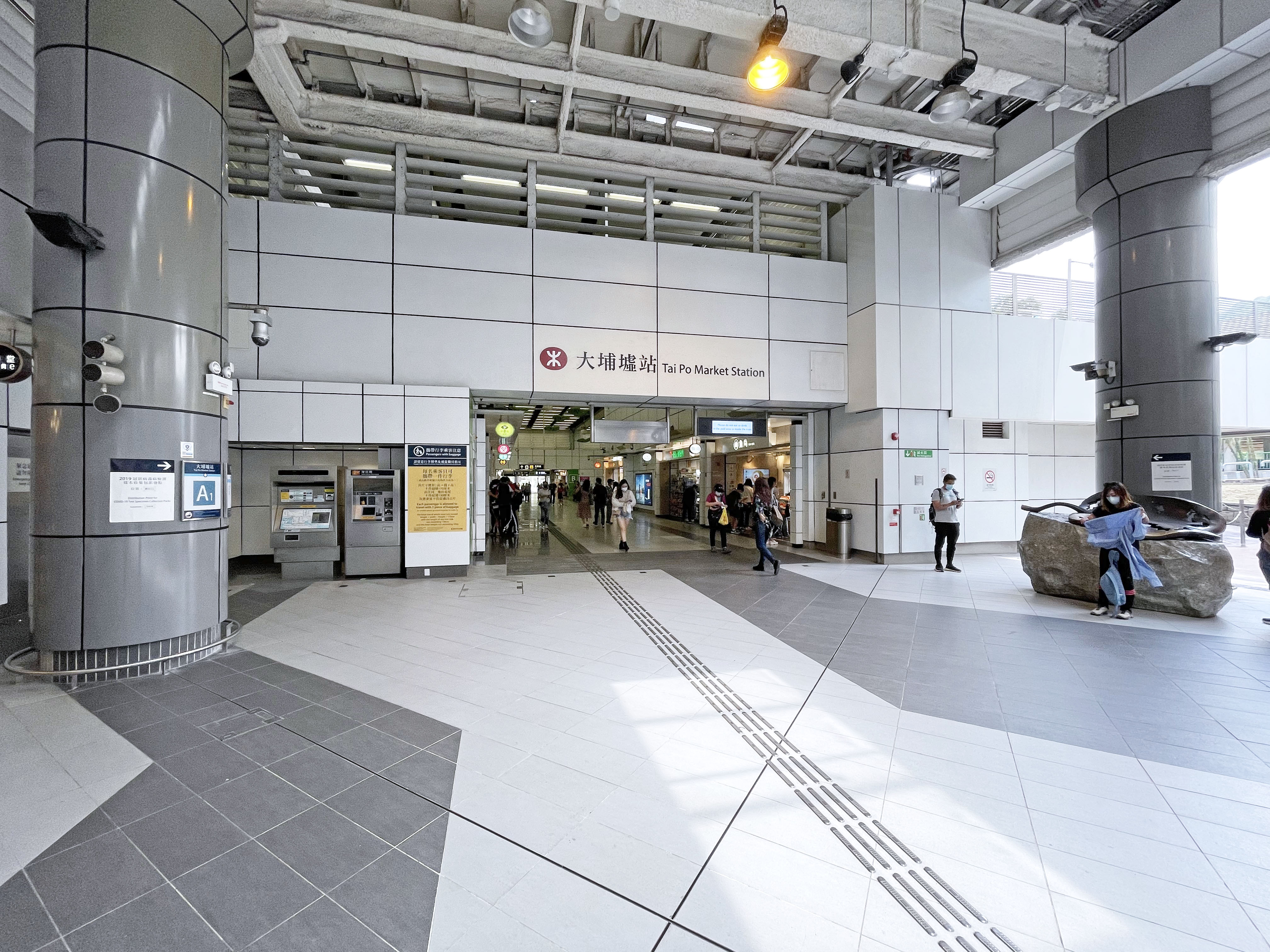
Exit A1 (April 2021)

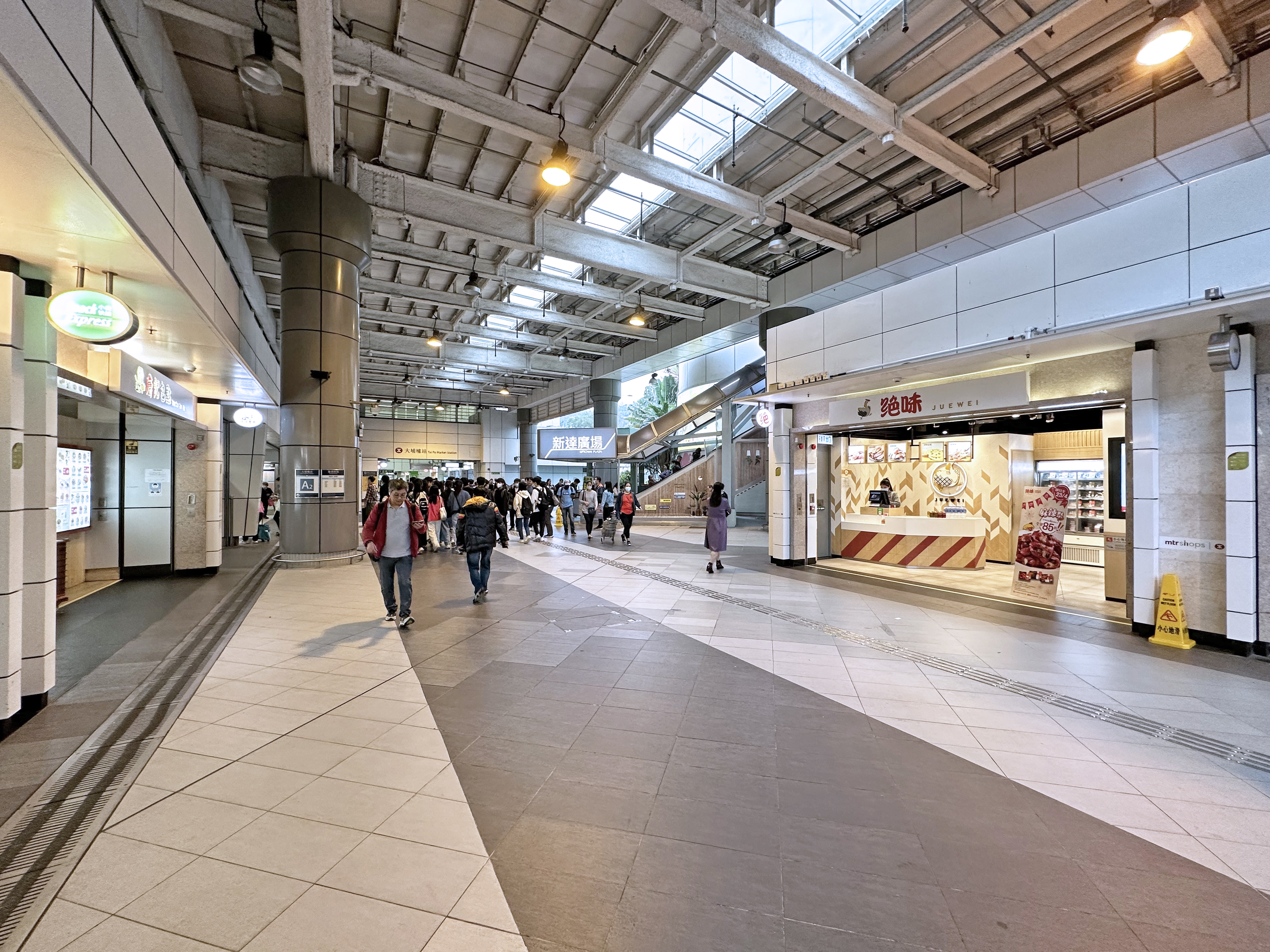
Exit A2 (March 2023)

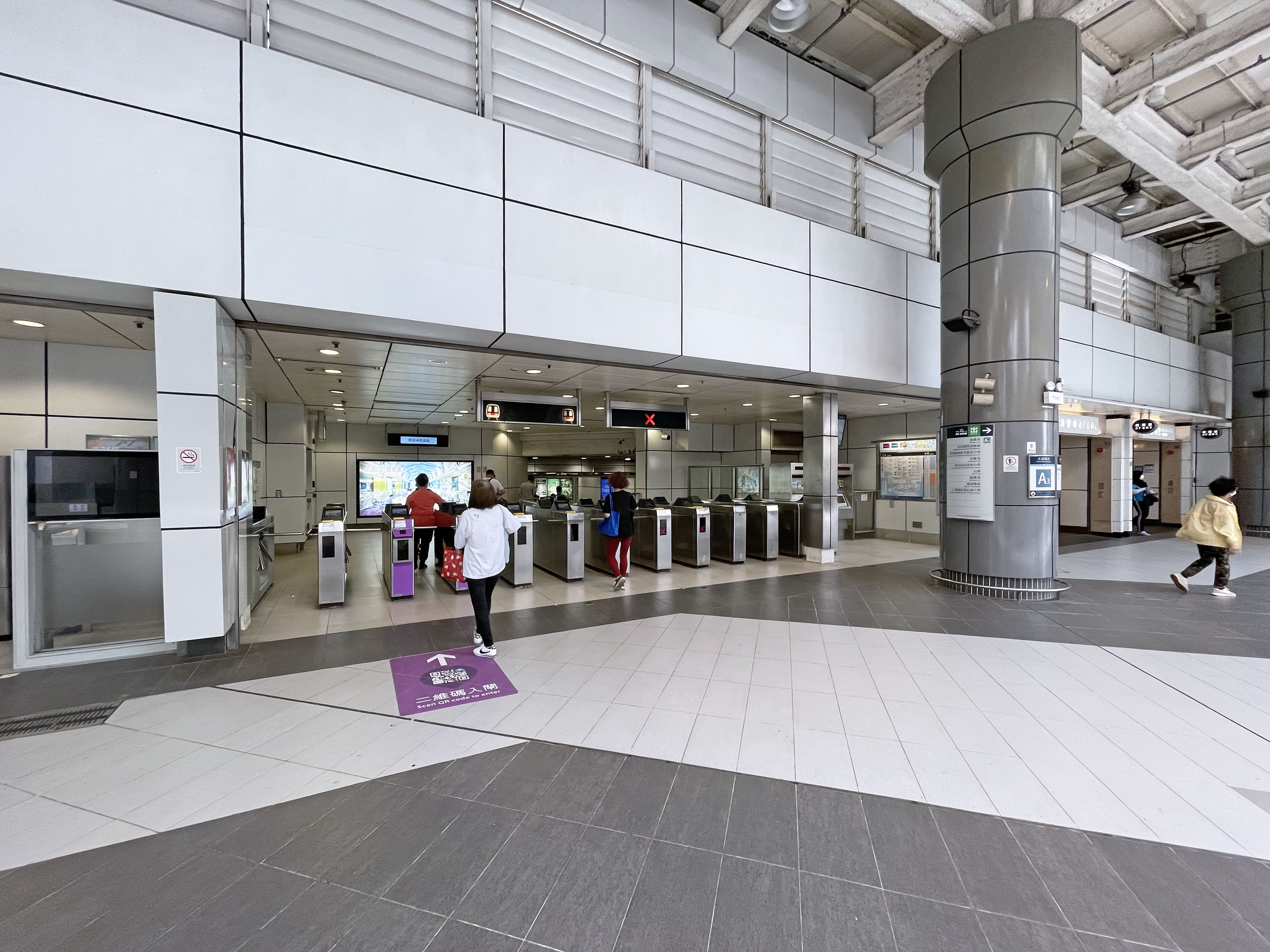
Exit A3 (April 2021)

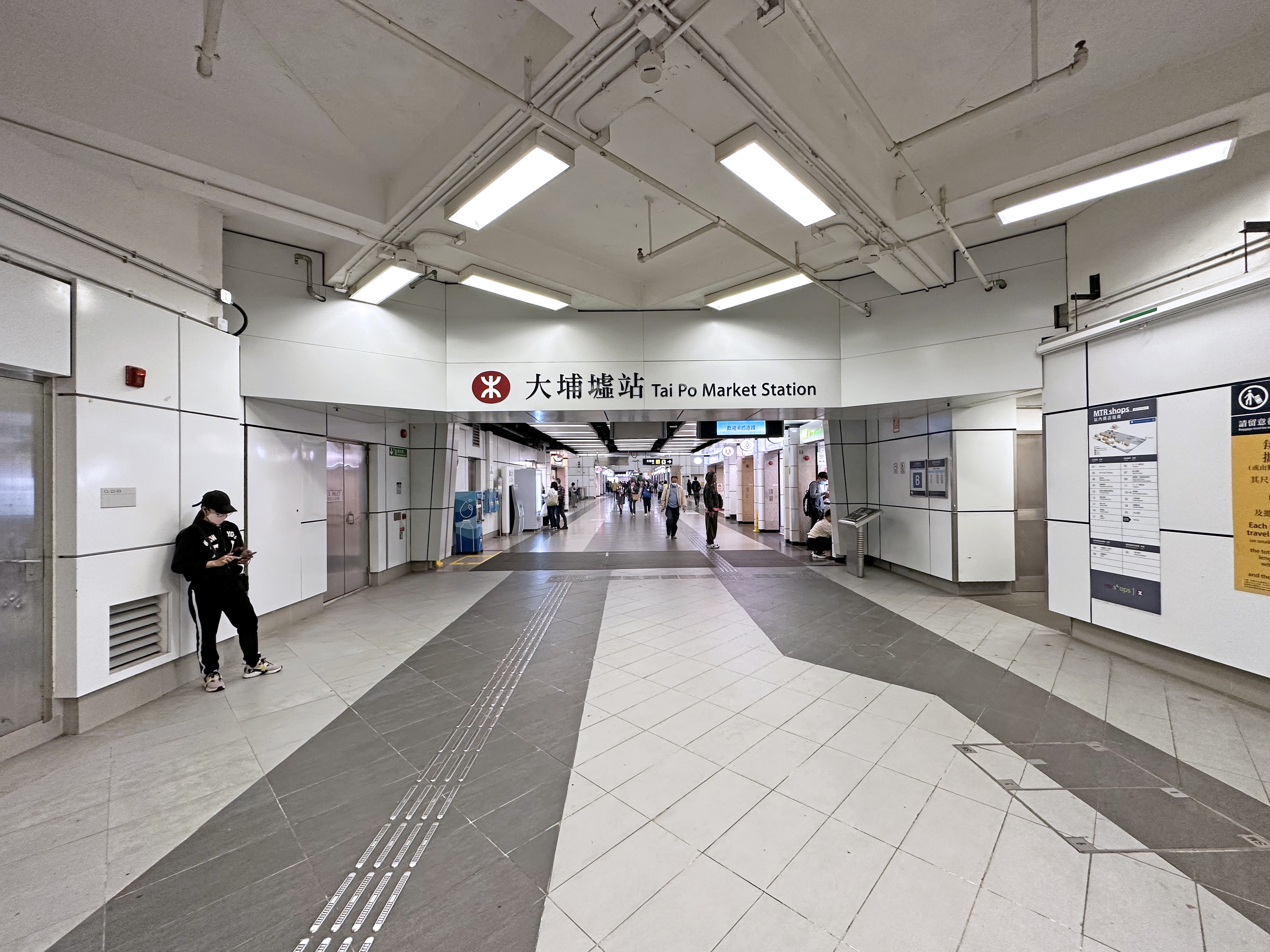
Exit B (March 2023)

=== Transport interchange ===
Bus and public light bus services are available for the few housing estates of Tai Po; bus services include MTR Bus (formerly KCR Feeder Bus) and Kowloon Motor Bus (KMB) services. Several routes of MTR Bus, such as route K14, which connects private housing estate Tai Po Centre, and the station, were introduced in 1980s. The bus terminus of the station also had routes that connected to other new towns of Hong Kong, such as KMB's route 64K that connects Tai Po and Yuen Long.

== Gallery ==
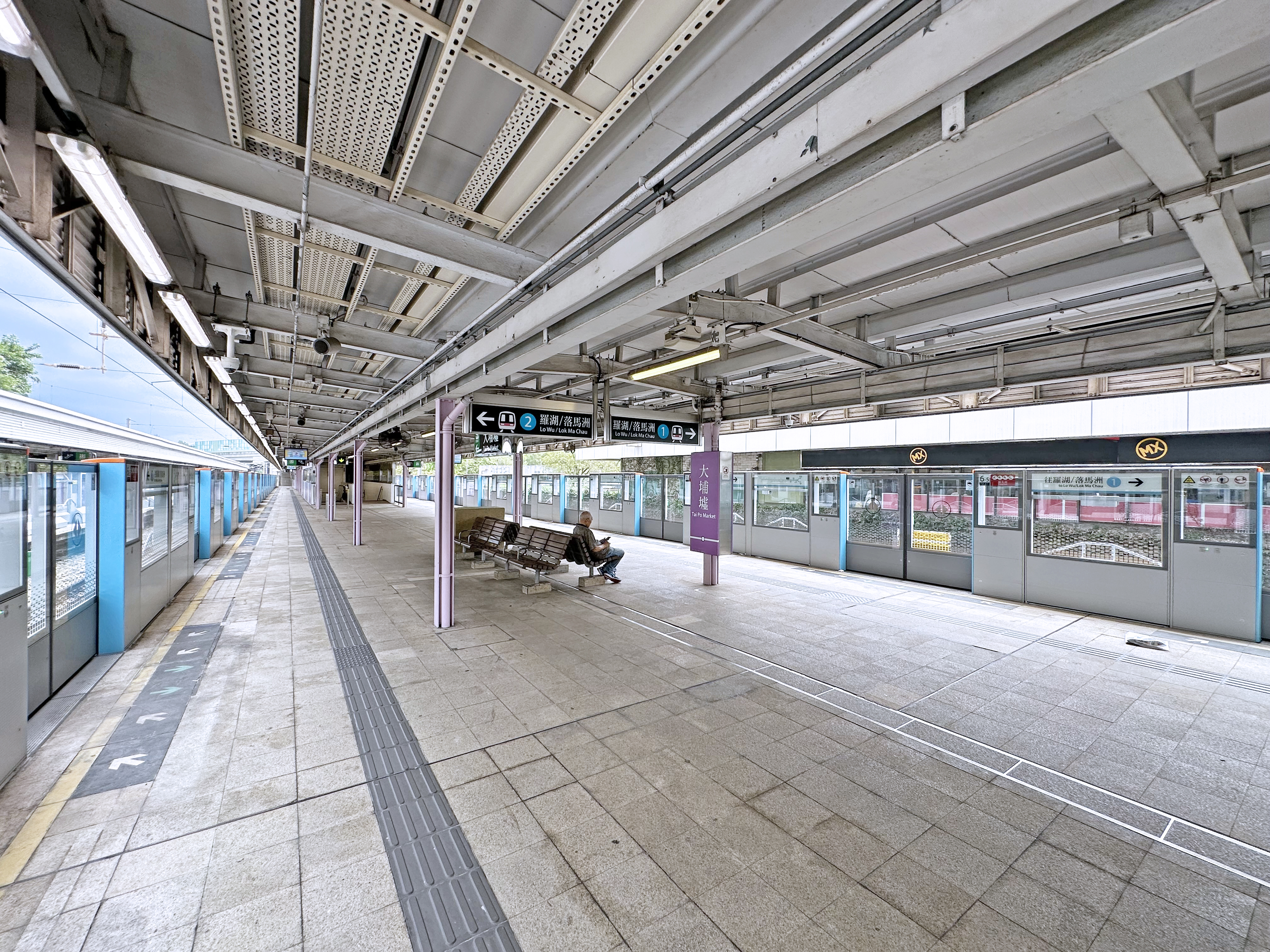
Platforms 1 and 2 (April 2024)

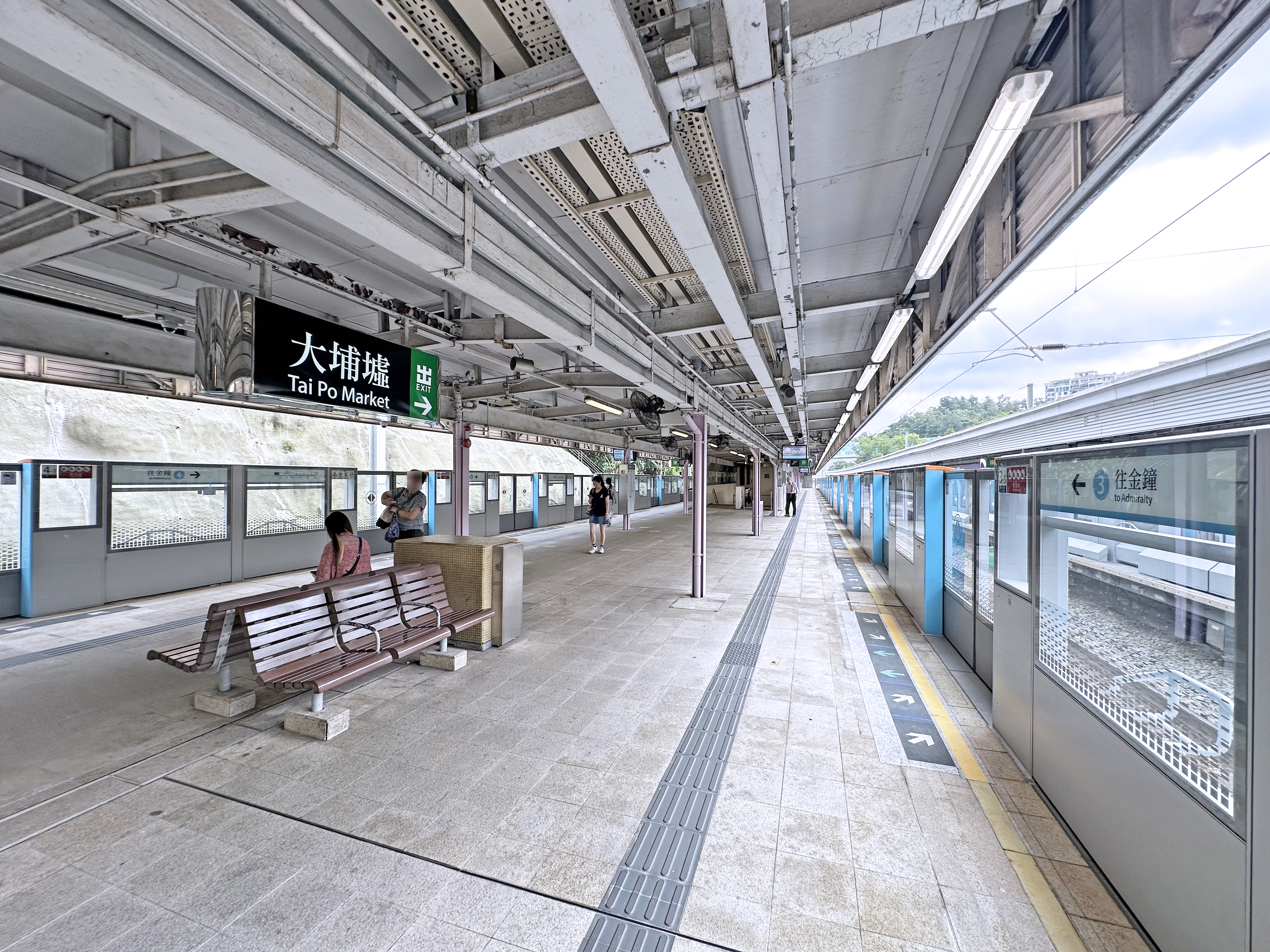
Platforms 3 and 4 (April 2024)

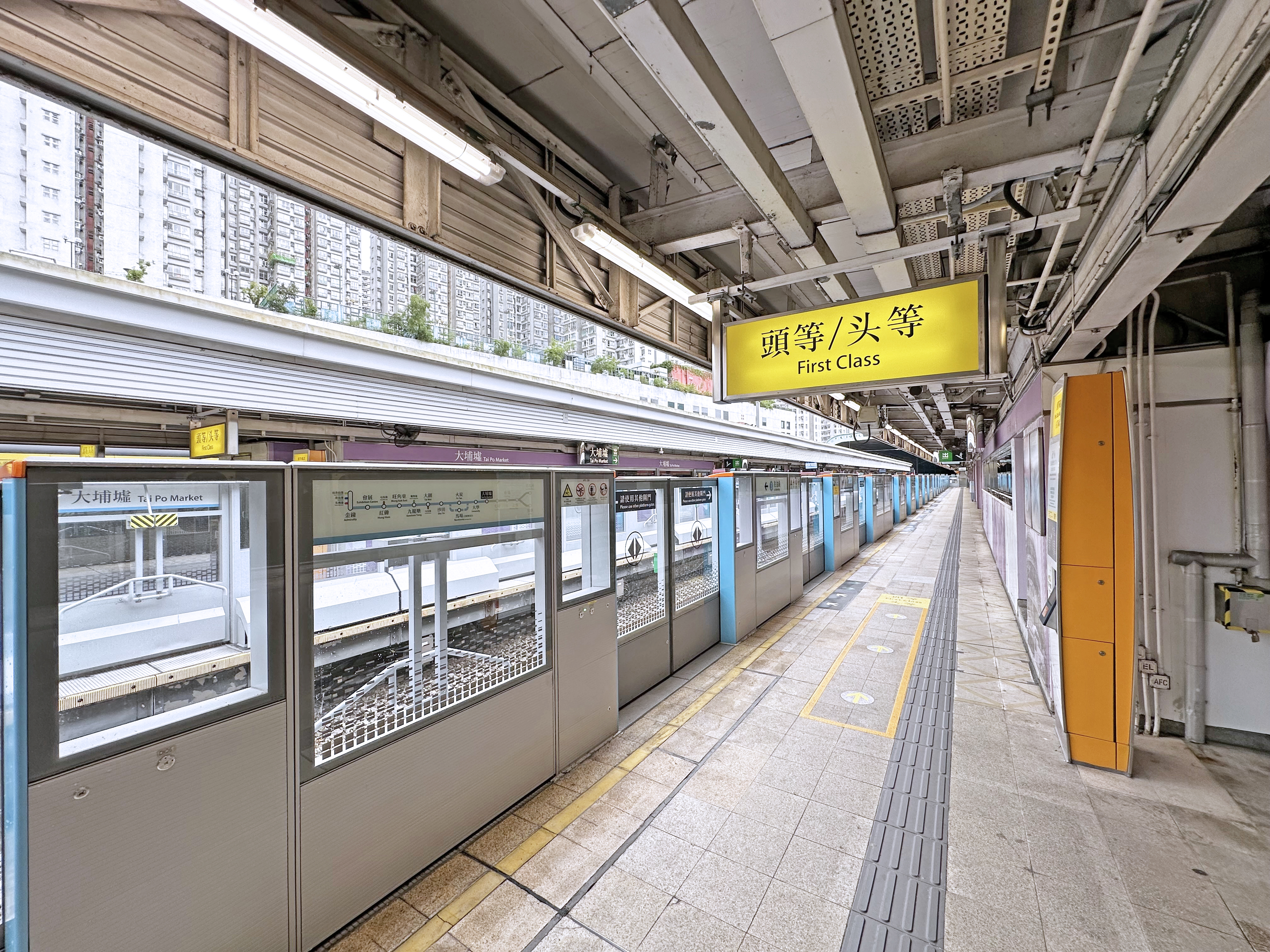
First Class Platform (September 2024)

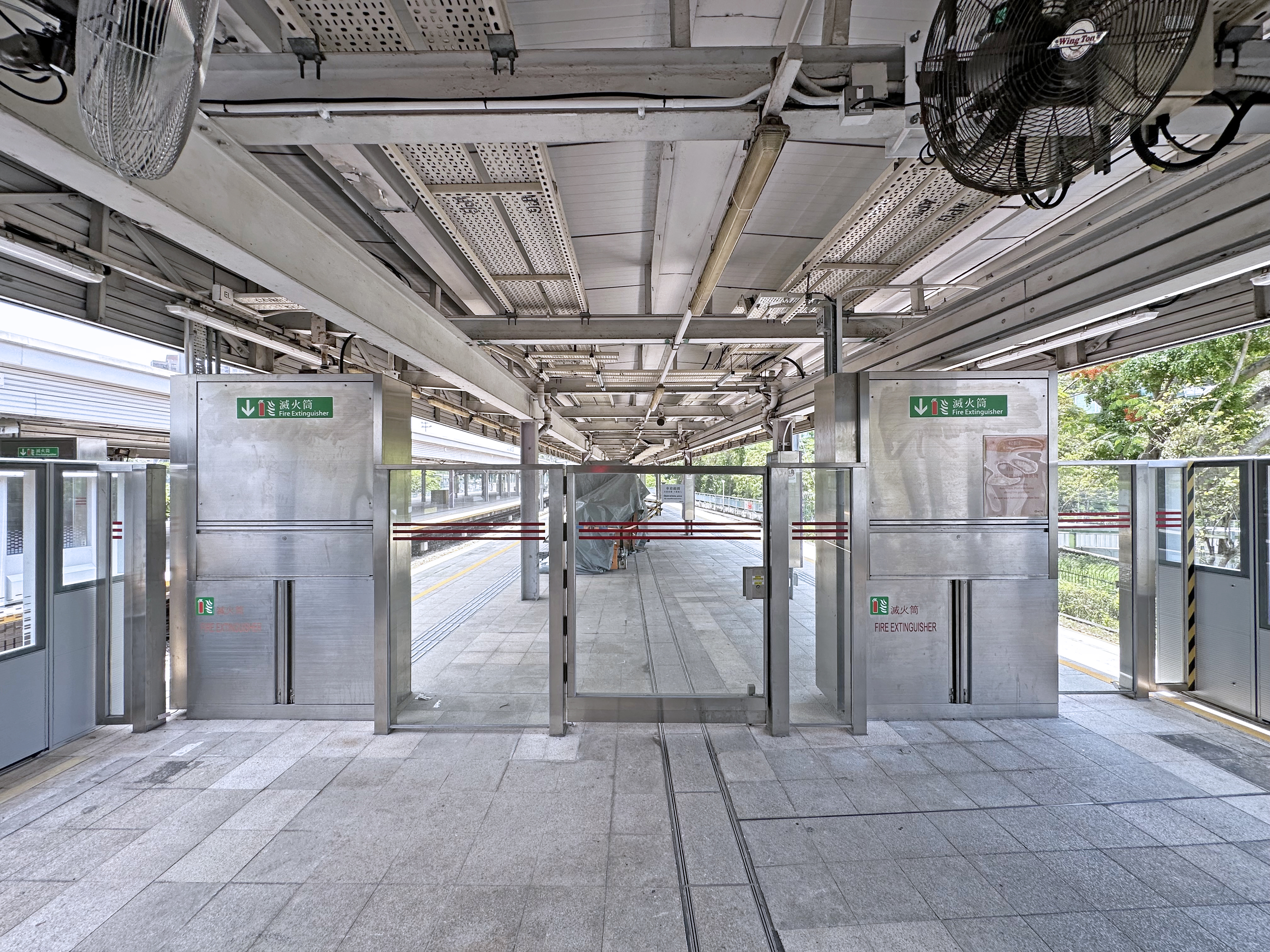
Glass barriers blocking off section of platform no longer in use

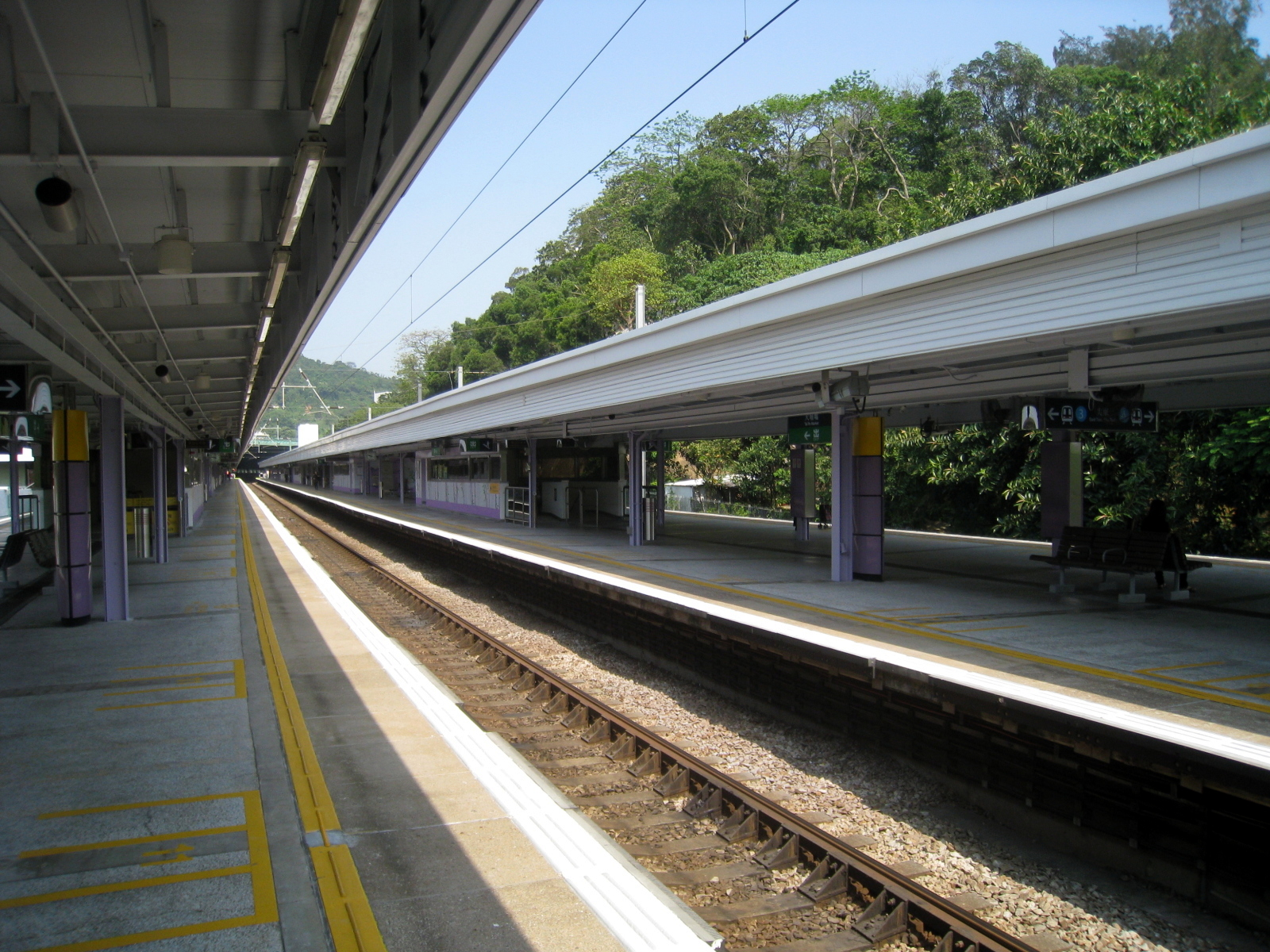
Platforms (2009)

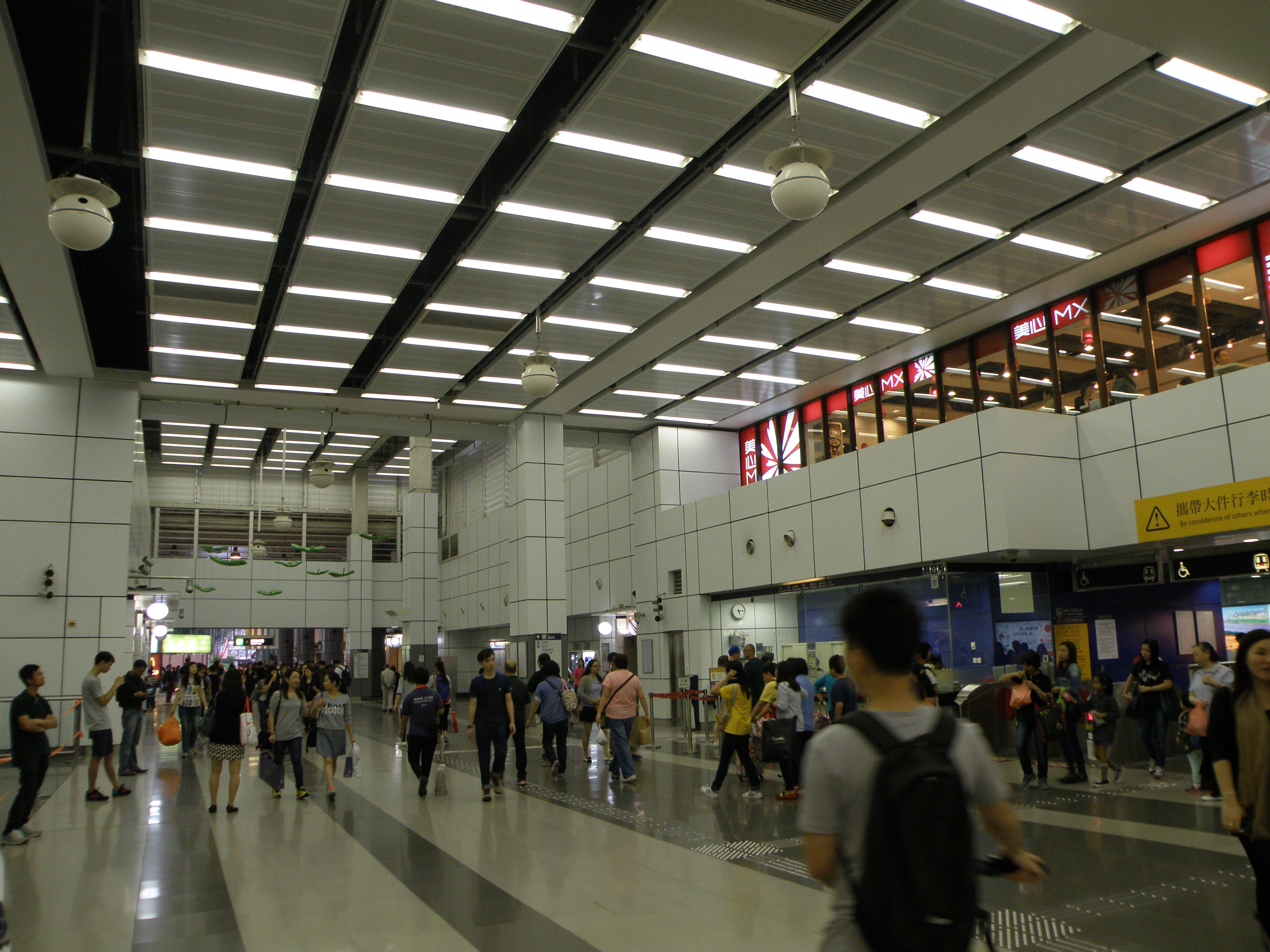
Concourse

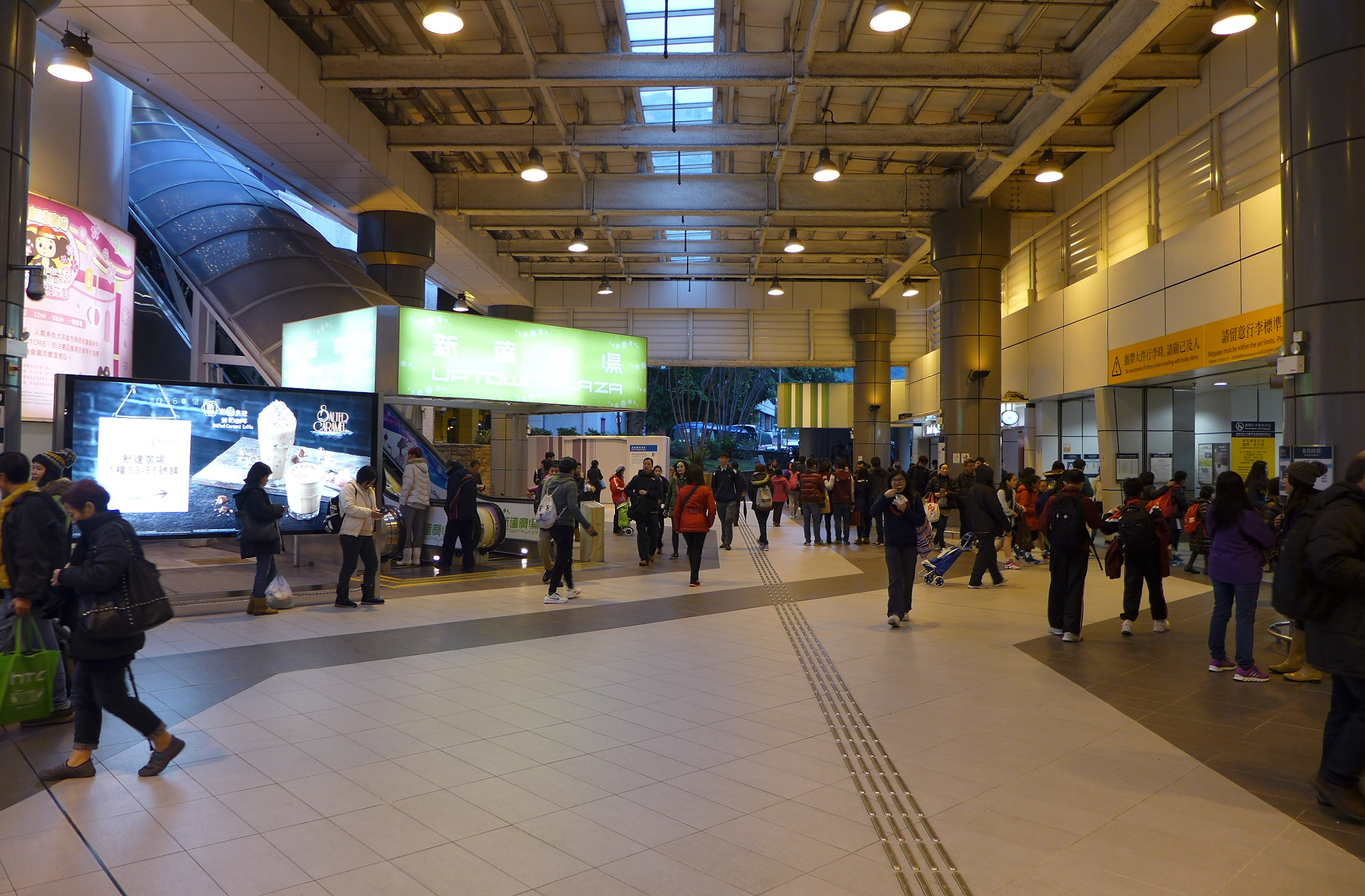
Open space outside station
