= EAL =

EAL may refer to:

== Education ==
- Deutsche Schule Lissabon (Portuguese: Escola Alemã de Lisboa), a German school in Lisbon, Portugal

== Science ==
- EAL domain, a conserved protein domain
- Ethanolamine ammonia-lyase
- Echelle Atomique Libre (Free Atomic Scale), a time scale underlying International Atomic Time

== Transportation ==
- Ealing Broadway station, in Greater London
- Eastern Air Lines, a defunct American airline in operation 1926 to 1991
- Eastern Air Lines (2015), a defunct American charter airline in operation 2011 to 2017
- Eastern Airlines, LLC, an American airline
- Ethiopian Airlines
- Emirates Air Line, former name of the London Cable Car
- East Rail line, in Hong Kong

== Other uses ==
- English as an additional language
- Evaluation Assurance Level
- Elephant Action League, an American conservation organisation
- Estonian Actuarial Society (Estonian: Eesti Aktuaaride Liit)

== See also ==
- Eel (disambiguation)
