= Tai Po Kau railway station =

Former railway station in Hong Kong

Tai Po Kau 大埔滘
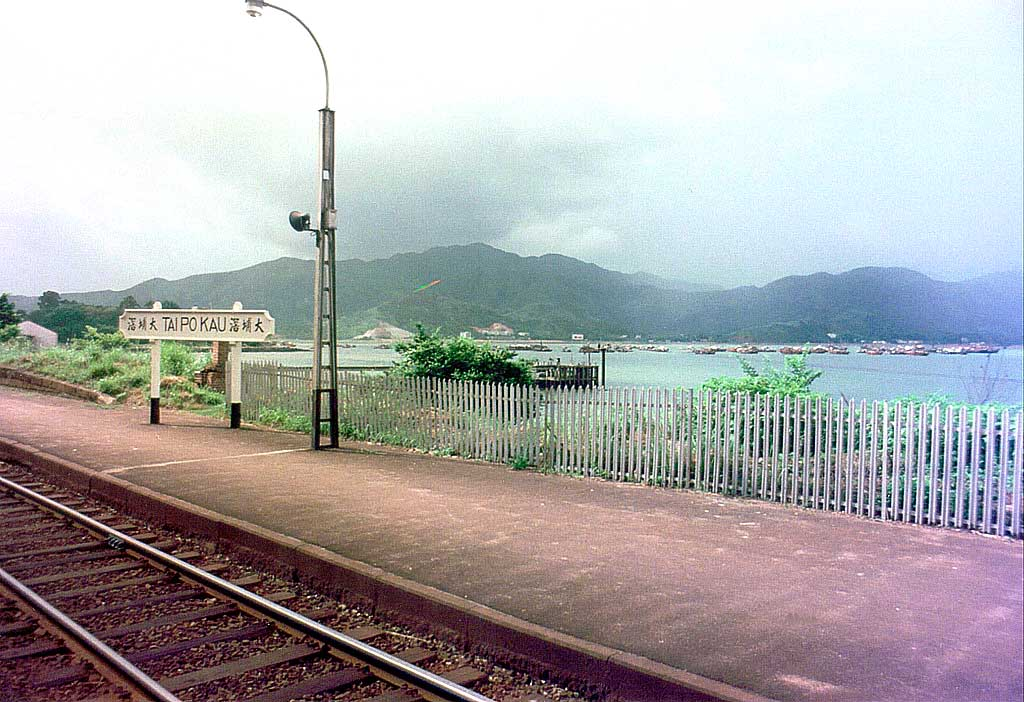
- The station as seen in 1968

General information
- Location: Tai Po Railway Pier, Tai Po Road — Tai Po Kau, Tai Po Kau; Tai Po District, Hong Kong
- Coordinates: 22°26′27″N 114°10′58″E
- System: KCR station
- Owner: Kowloon-Canton Railway Corporation
- Operator: Kowloon-Canton Railway Corporation
- Line: Kowloon–Canton Railway (British Section)
- Platforms: 2 (side platforms)
- Tracks: 2
- Connections: Bus, public light bus, kai-to

Construction
- Structure type: At-grade
- Platform levels: 1

History
- Opened: 1 October 1910; 115 years ago
- Closed: 2 May 1983; 43 years ago

Services
Preceding station	KCR	Following station
University towards Kowloon	KCR British section	Tai Po Market towards Lo Wu
Location
- Location within MTR

Tai Po Kau (Chinese: 大埔滘車站), also signed simply as Tai Po (that name was used for the station until 1966), was a railway station on the British section of the Kowloon–Canton Railway in Tai Po Kau, New Territories, Hong Kong. Its location next to Tai Po Hoi and a pier serving the northeast New Territories made Tai Po Kau a transport hub.

The station had traditional Chinese architecture.

As roads and public transport were improved in the area and as the remote villages depopulated, the importance of the station and the pier declined quickly. The station was abandoned when the railway was electrified in the early 1980s. At this time, two ferry routes serving the adjacent pier (to Tap Mun and Tung Ping Chau) were moved to the Ma Liu Shui Pier near University station.

In the 1990s, the station structure was removed and replaced with staff quarters of the KCR Corporation. This development is called "Trackside Villas" and is linked to Tai Po Market station by a shuttle bus.
