= Eel River Township, Indiana =

Eel River Township is the name of two townships in Indiana:

- Eel River Township, Allen County, Indiana
- Eel River Township, Hendricks County, Indiana

== See also ==
- Eel River (disambiguation)
- Eel (disambiguation)
