= Eel (disambiguation) =

An eel is a fish in the order of Anguilliformes.

Eel, EEL or eels may also refer to:

== Animals ==
=== Amphibians ===
- Congo eel, amphibians of the genus Amphiuma (order Caudata)
- Siren intermedia or two-legged eel or mud eel
- Rubber eel, an aquatic caecilian of the family Typhlonectidae (order Gymnophiona)

=== Ray-finned fish ===
- Electric eel, a genus of knifefish in the order Gymnotiformes
- Deep-sea spiny eels, a common name for fish in the family Notacanthidae, order Notacanthiformes
- Fire eel
- Spiny eel
- Swamp eel

== People ==
- Camille Henry (1933–1997), Canadian National Hockey League player nicknamed "The Eel"
- Eric Moussambani (born 1978), Equatorial Guinean swimmer nicknamed "Eric the Eel"

== Places ==
- Eel Glacier, Washington state, United States
- Eel Lake, Oregon, United States
- Eels Lake, Ontario, Canada
- Eel River (disambiguation)
- Eel Township, Cass County, Indiana, United States
- Crag Hill, Lake District, UK, a mountain formerly known as Eel Crag

== Arts and entertainment ==
- Eels (band), a musical group
- Eels (album), 2024 album by Being Dead
- "Eels" (The Mighty Boosh), a 2007 episode of The Mighty Boosh
- The Eel (film), a 1997 Japanese film
- USS Eel, a fictional submarine in the novel Run Silent, Run Deep and its film adaptation
- "Eel", 3rd episode of Servant (TV series)

=== Fictional characters ===
- Eel (Marvel Comics), two Marvel Comics villains
- Eel (G.I. Joe), a set of fictional characters in the G.I. Joe universe
- The Eel (fictional character), a pulp fiction character
- Eel O'Brien, real name of Plastic Man, a comic book superhero

== Other uses ==
- Eel as food
- Electron energy loss spectroscopy
- Entwicklung und Erprobung von Leichtflugzeugen, a German aircraft design concern based in Putzbrunn
- Environmentally Endangered Lands, a wildland conservation program in Brevard County, Florida
- Extensible Embeddable Language, a scripting and programming language
- Parramatta Eels, an Australian rugby league club
- USS Eel (SS-354), a projected United States Navy submarine
- Elastic potential energy, sometimes abbreviated as "eel" in Physics
- Exobiology Extant Life Surveyor, abbreviated as "EELS", lunar surveyor

== See also ==
- EAL (disambiguation)
- Eeles, a name
