= East Rail line =

Hong Kong MTR railway line

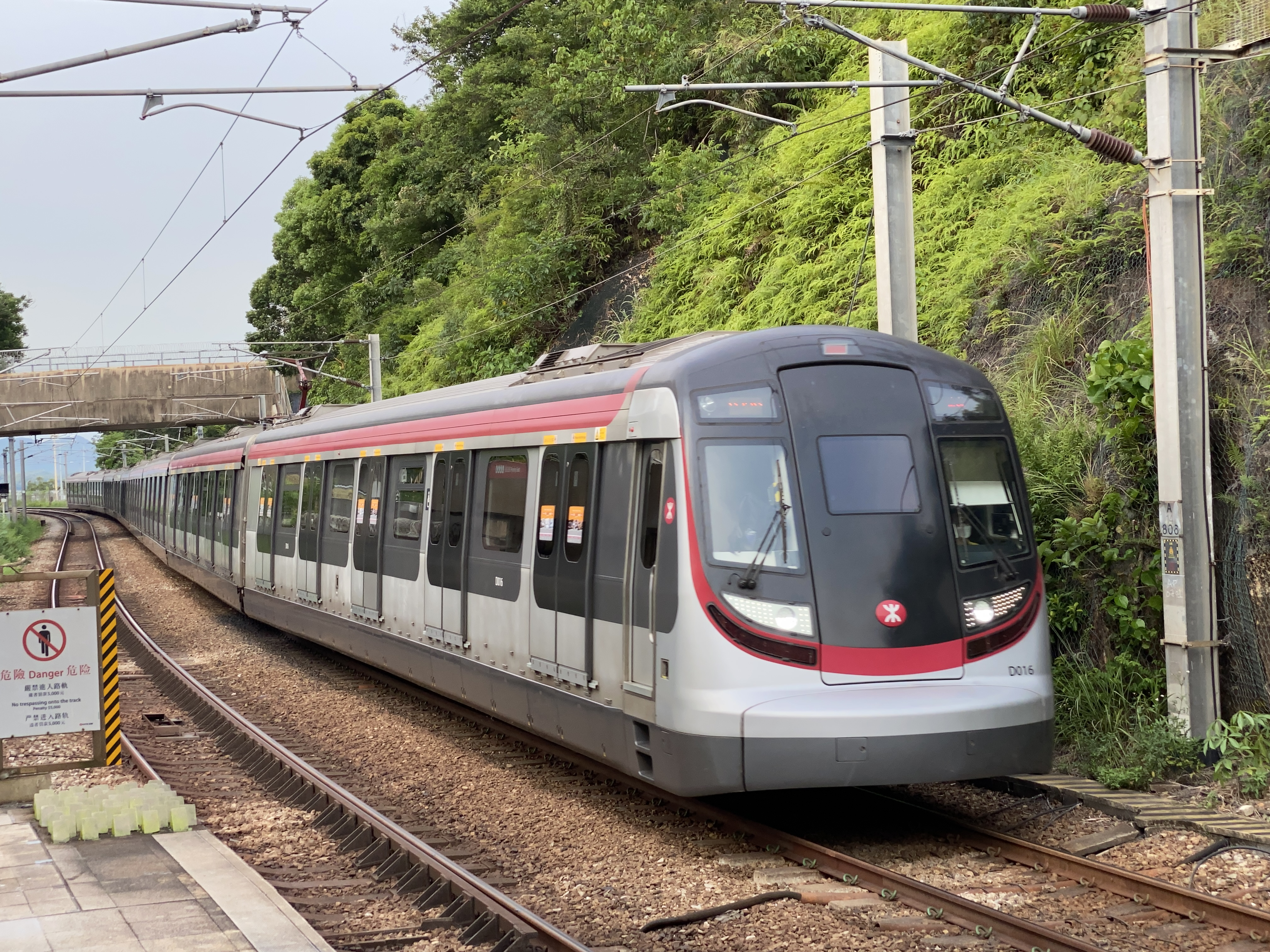
- A Hyundai Rotem R-train EMU entering University station

Overview
- Other names: Formerly called: Kowloon–Canton Railway (British Section) (九廣鐵路 (英段); 1910–1996); KCR East Rail (九廣東鐵; 1996–2007)
- Native name: 東鐵綫
- Status: Operational
- Owner: Kowloon-Canton Railway Corporation
- Locale: Districts: Yuen Long, North, Tai Po, Sha Tin, Kowloon City, Sham Shui Po, Yau Tsim Mong, Wan Chai, Central and Western
- Termini: Lo Wu or Lok Ma Chau; Admiralty
- Connecting lines: ■ Kwun Tong line (via Kowloon Tong); ■ Island line (via Admiralty); ■ South Island line (via Admiralty); ■ Tsuen Wan line (via Admiralty); ■ Tuen Ma line (via Hung Hom, Tai Wai); Shenzhen Metro: ■ Line 1 ■ Line 4 ■ Line 10
- Former connections: ■ Ma On Shan line; ■ West Rail line
- Stations: 16
- Color on map: Light blue (#53B7E8)

Service
- Type: Commuter rail / Rapid transit
- System: MTR
- Operator: MTR Corporation
- Depot: Ho Tung Lau
- Rolling stock: Hyundai Rotem EMU: R-train
- Ridership: 1,044,800 daily average (weekdays, September 2014)

History
- Opened: 1 October 1910; 116 years ago
- Last extension: 2022
- Electrification completed: 15 July 1983 (Lo Wu to Kowloon)

Technical
- Line length: 46 km (29 mi)
- Num of tracks: Double-track
- Track gauge: 1,435 mm (4 ft 8 1/2 in) standard gauge
- Electrification: 25 kV 50 Hz AC (Overhead line)
- Operating speed: Average: 50 km/h (31 mph); Maximum: 120 km/h (75 mph)
- Signalling: Siemens CBTC (Trainguard MT)
- Train protection system: AWS (Only for KTT through-trains, which were discontinued since 2020)
Route map

East Rail line
- Traditional Chinese: 東鐵綫
- Simplified Chinese: 东铁线
Transcriptions
Standard Mandarin
- Hanyu Pinyin: dong1 tie3 xian4
Hakka
- Romanization: Tûng-Thiet-Sien
Yue: Cantonese
- Yale Romanization: dūng tit sin
- Jyutping: dung1 tit3 sin3

The East Rail line (Chinese: 東鐵綫) is one of the ten lines that form the MTR, the mass transit system in Hong Kong. The railway line begins at Admiralty station on Hong Kong Island, bifurcates at Sheung Shui, and terminates at Lo Wu or Lok Ma Chau (both of which are boundary crossing points into Shenzhen). At approximately 46 km (29 mi), the line (including the Lok Ma Chau Spur Line) is the second-longest line within the network, following the Tuen Ma line.

The line connects the new towns of Fanling–Sheung Shui, Tai Po and Sha Tin in eastern New Territories with urban Kowloon and the central business district. It is also the city's only railway line that connects to land-based border checkpoints with Mainland China. The line is generally double-tracked and electrified, except for certain goods sheds. All of the stations on the line except Admiralty, Exhibition Centre and Hung Hom are at-grade or elevated. As of 2018, the line carried around 1 million passenger trips per day.

The line was the first heavy rail line in Hong Kong; it opened in 1910 as the Kowloon–Canton Railway (British Section). Prior to the MTR–KCR merger in 2007, the line (then known as KCR East Rail) formed part of the Kowloon–Canton Railway (KCR) network and was managed by the Kowloon-Canton Railway Corporation (KCRC). On 2 December 2007, the line was taken over by MTR Corporation (MTRC) and was given its current name. KCRC continues to own the line and its infrastructure while leasing its operations to MTRC.

The same railway was used for intercity passenger and freight services crossing the boundary into Mainland China. Freight services on the line ceased in 2009, while the intercity passenger services were suspended in early 2020 during the coronavirus pandemic, with no plans to resume service despite border reopenings.

== History ==
=== Background ===
==== Proposal ====
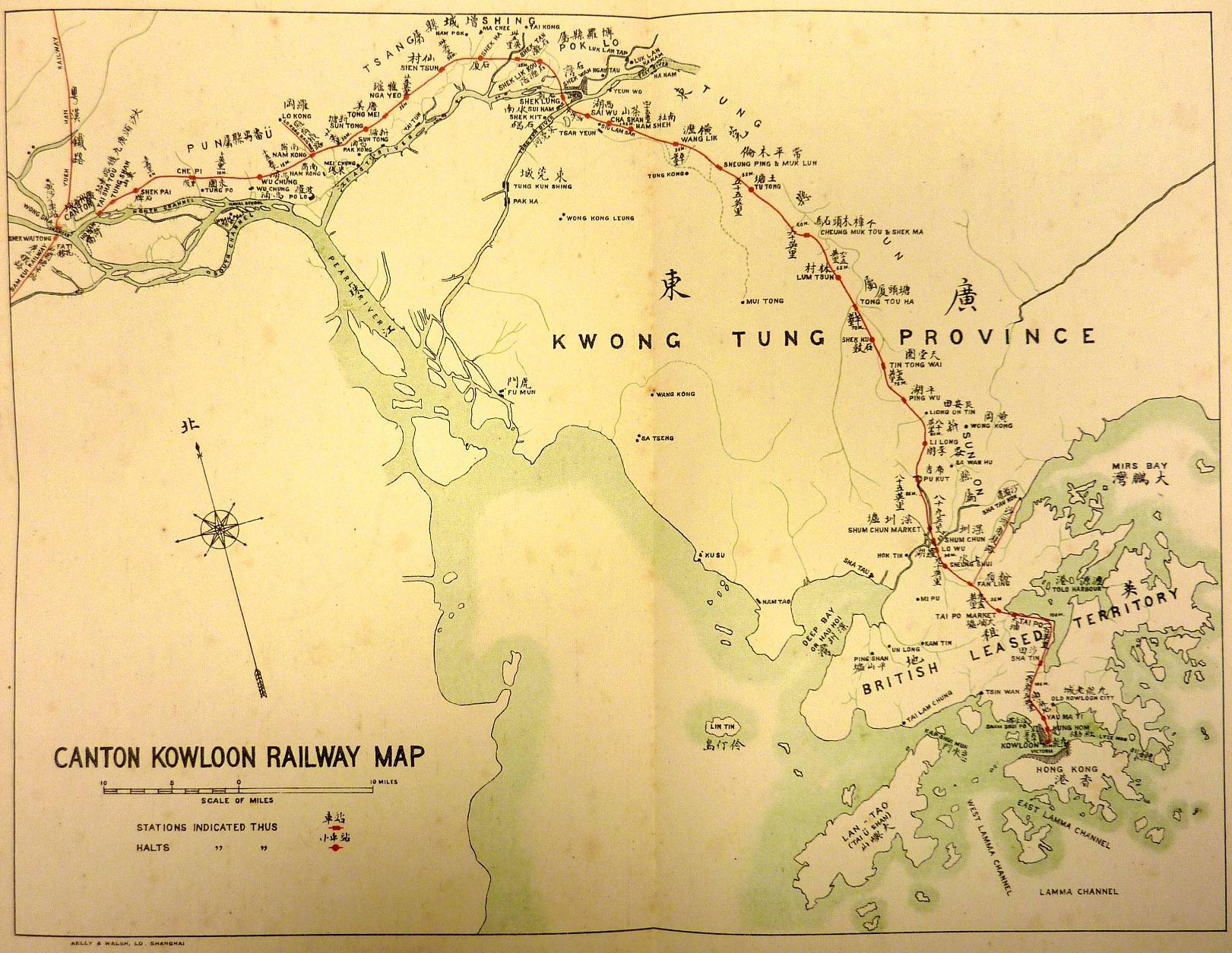
The full original route of the Kowloon–Canton Railway (KCR)

The United Kingdom and China signed an agreement to cooperate on the construction of a railway from Kowloon to Canton (now Guangzhou). The whole project was 87 miles (140 km) long, with 22 miles (35 km) in the British Section and 65 miles (105 km) for the Chinese Section. Construction started in 1906. The most difficult section was the approx. 7200-foot-long (2195 m) Beacon Hill Tunnel, and about a hundred workers died in the construction.

==== Construction ====
The construction was mainly carried out by the Chinese. The government built camps in Kowloon to support the construction. Most of the railway alignment was on flat land, so construction was relatively easy in those places, however, the construction of the Beacon Hill Tunnel involved digging and blasting. The tunnel's two ends were of soft soil, but the centre was granite. This caused a delay in construction as it was not suitable to use explosives at the two ends while the explosives could not blast off a lot of rock in the centre.

=== Pre-electrification era ===
The railway line to the Chinese border, then called the Kowloon-Canton Railway (British Section) (KCRBS; 九廣鐵路英段), opened for passenger services on 1 October 1910. The remaining section from Lo Wu to Canton (now Guangzhou) was called the "Chinese Section" (now the Guangzhou-Shenzhen railway). Initially, service was only provided from Yaumati station to Fanling station with a tunnel through Beacon Hill.

After the "Chinese Section" was completed, through train service to Canton through Sham Chun (now Shenzhen) became available. Lo Wu station also serves as a border crossing, with a bridge across the Sham Chun River, the natural border between Hong Kong and Mainland China. Trains had to stop at Lo Wu station after Communist China closed the border and suspended the through train service in 1949.

The line was generally single track, with a passing loop at each station. It was originally built with narrow gauge tracks, but just before opening standard gauge track was laid and the original tracks were used to build a branch line, the Sha Tau Kok Railway from Fanling to Sha Tau Kok. This branch was unsuccessful and closed on 1 April 1928 following the opening of a road that ran parallel to the tracks.

Through the years, more stations were added to the line. Sheung Shui station was opened in the 1930s, and Ma Liu Shui (now University) station opened in 1955.

The KCR engines were powered by steam engines before the 1950s. There were 20 engines. However, diesel engines were purchased starting from 1950, with the first one with number 51. On 27 April 1956, a steam engine train exploded in Hung Hom with 6 people died. After the accident, the railway accelerated to phase out steam engine and replaced by diesel.

The development of the towns along the line began to grow immensely during the 1970s, prompting a modernisation of the Kowloon-Canton Railway. The original Kowloon station terminus at Tsim Sha Tsui was too small and had no room for expansion, so a new terminus site was chosen in Hung Hom. Hung Hom station replaced the old one and the old Hung Hom station in 1975. Today, a clock tower is the only structure left from the old terminus, and is a landmark near the Cultural Centre, Space Museum and the Star Ferry pier. Six pillars dismantled from the original station building were relocated to the Urban Council Centenary Garden in Tsim Sha Tsui East. A big bell is stored at Ho Tung Lau. The original Hung Hom station at Chatham Road South was also demolished.

=== 1980s modernisation ===
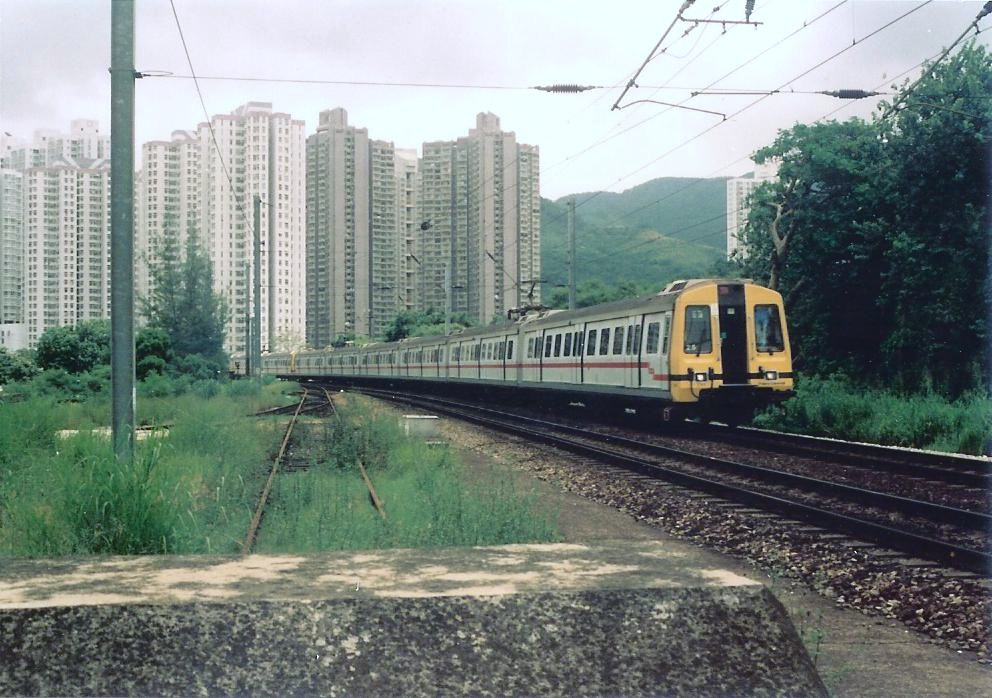
The Metro-Cammell EMU in its original form, shortly after the railway's electrification

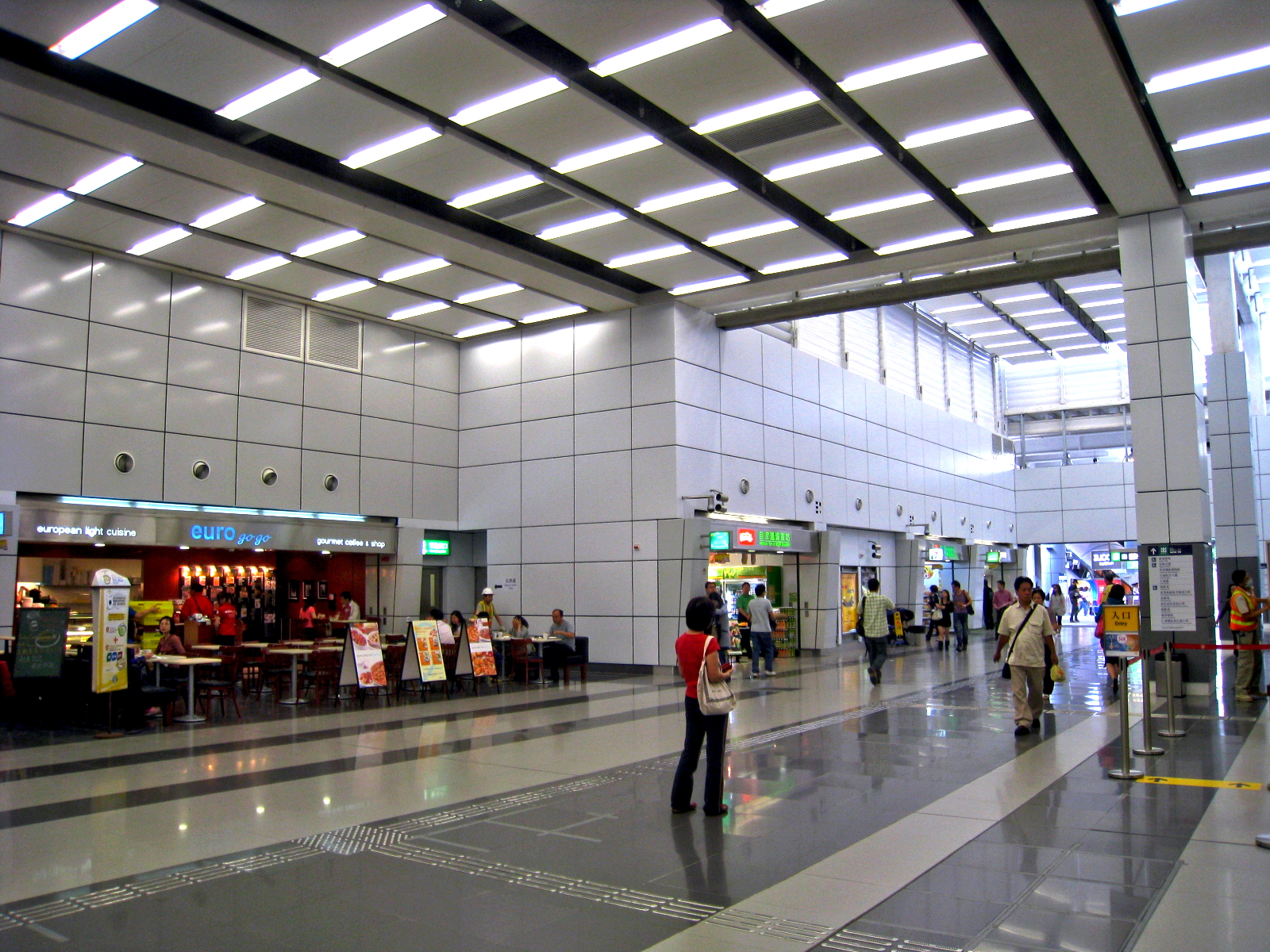
Tai Po Market station concourse

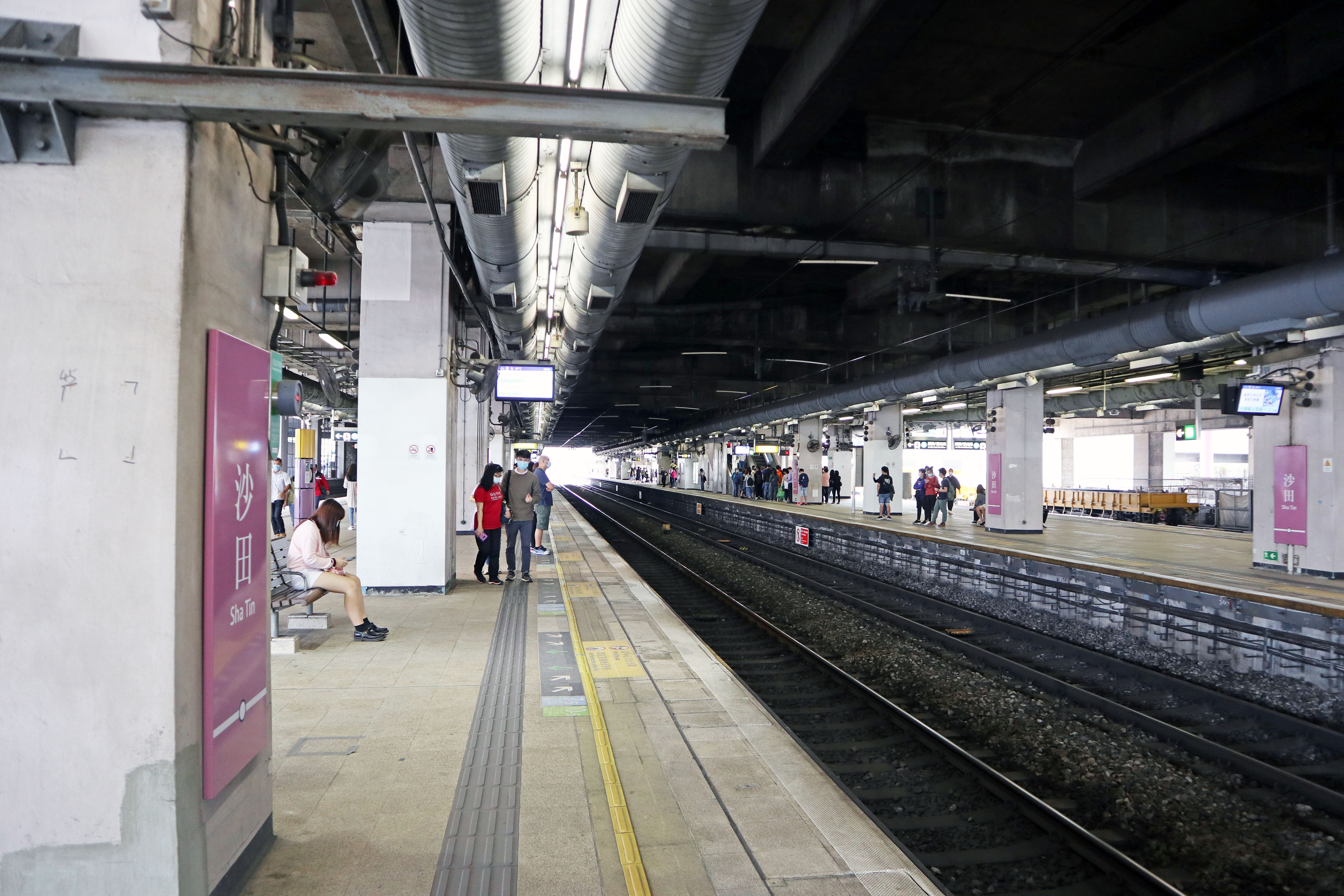
Sha Tin station platform

In 1975, the KCR asked two consultancies, Sofrerail and Transmark, to make proposals on the modernisation of the line. In 1979, Transmark's proposal to double-track and electrify the entire line for $2.5 billion (in 1979 prices) was accepted by the government. This work involved building a new tunnel through Beacon Hill as the existing tunnel was not wide enough to accommodate two tracks. New stations were added, including Kowloon Tong station, which was completed in 1982 to provide an interchange with the new MTR network. Tai Po Kau station and the original Tai Po Market station were closed, with the latter being redeveloped into the Hong Kong Railway Museum. The development finished in sections between 1982 and 1983, with new Metro Cammell EMUs, manufactured by Metro-Cammell in England, replacing diesel locomotives.

With the modernisation of the railway and the concurrent urbanisation of the New Territories, ridership rose quickly, from a daily average of 190,000 in 1983 to 491,000 in 1990. A temporary station in Tai Wai opened in 1983 while the permanent Tai Wai station was completed in 1986. Fo Tan station opened in 1985 to serve the expanding industrial estate. Tai Wo station opened in 1989 to serve Tai Wo Estate and to replace Tai Po Kau station and the old Tai Po Market station.

=== Expansion since the 1990s ===
The 1990s saw more rapid development and changes within the railway. The Kowloon-Canton Railway Corporation (KCRC) signed a contract with Anglo-French manufacturing giant GEC-Alsthom to refurbish the Metro-Cammell EMUs at the East Rail depot at Ho Tung Lau. In 1996, the first refurbished train was put into service on the line, which was now known as KCR East Rail (九廣東鐵), and trains now allow passengers to traverse from one end to another (except for the first class carriage), when trains once ran on four three-car EMUs. All but three of the 351 railcars were refurbished; the only unit exempt from refurbishment was unit E44 (144-244-444), which is currently stored in Ho Tung Lau depot. The yellow-cab train was formally retired with a "Farewell Ride" on 31 October 1999.

When refurbished, each set was still made up of 12 cars (with one first-class car). Prior to the rule proclaimed in 1994 which fixed the number of cars on each set to 12, trains were inconsistent in terms of length, ranging from six cars (two EMUs), nine cars (three EMUs) to 12 cars (four EMUs).

In terms of appearance, trains no longer have the monotonous design of having a red stripe running across the middle from the cab to the end; the doors now have a red coating, and the window panes along with the upper part are fashioned with blue paint. The original design of the train front, encapsulating the driver's cab and commonly referred to as the "Yellow-cab", was replaced with a more modern design capped with a silver coating, and a digital display added providing the train's destination.

The design of the EMU was modified as well: four more sets of doors being added to each car, adding up to a total of ten sets of doors, each side with five; the introduction of new passenger information plasma display; and more standing space by rearranging seating patterns from the traditional back-to-back seating to a longitudinal design.

In 1998, a new signalling system, known as Transmission balise-locomotive (TBL, as used in Belgium), came into operation on the line. This Automatic Train Protection (ATP) system, a replacement for the previous Automatic Warning System (AWS) developed in Britain, ensures a safe distance is maintained between trains. It also allowed an increase in train frequencies from 20 to 24 per hour each way. The control centre was also relocated from Kowloon station to a new facility in the KCRC operations headquarters building at KCRC House (now known as the Fo Tan Railway House). Also as part of the ATP project, a two kilometre section of the tracks near the Pak Shek Kok reclamation, curving around the former coastline, was straightened out during the mid-1990s. The tracks now run alongside the Tolo Highway. A vestige of the former alignment, an old bridge beside Cheung Shue Tan village built between 1906 and 1909, was identified by the Antiquities and Monuments Office in 2008 as a historic asset.

In 2002, an automatic train operation (ATO) system was added to TBL, which controls the speed of the train for the driver and ensures that all trains will stop when arriving at every station. Under normal circumstances, most trains are operated in ATO mode except for scenarios such as operation of trains in and out of train depots, driver training, or at times when the ATO system fails to function properly. However, intercity trains using the East Rail line continue to operate on AWS.

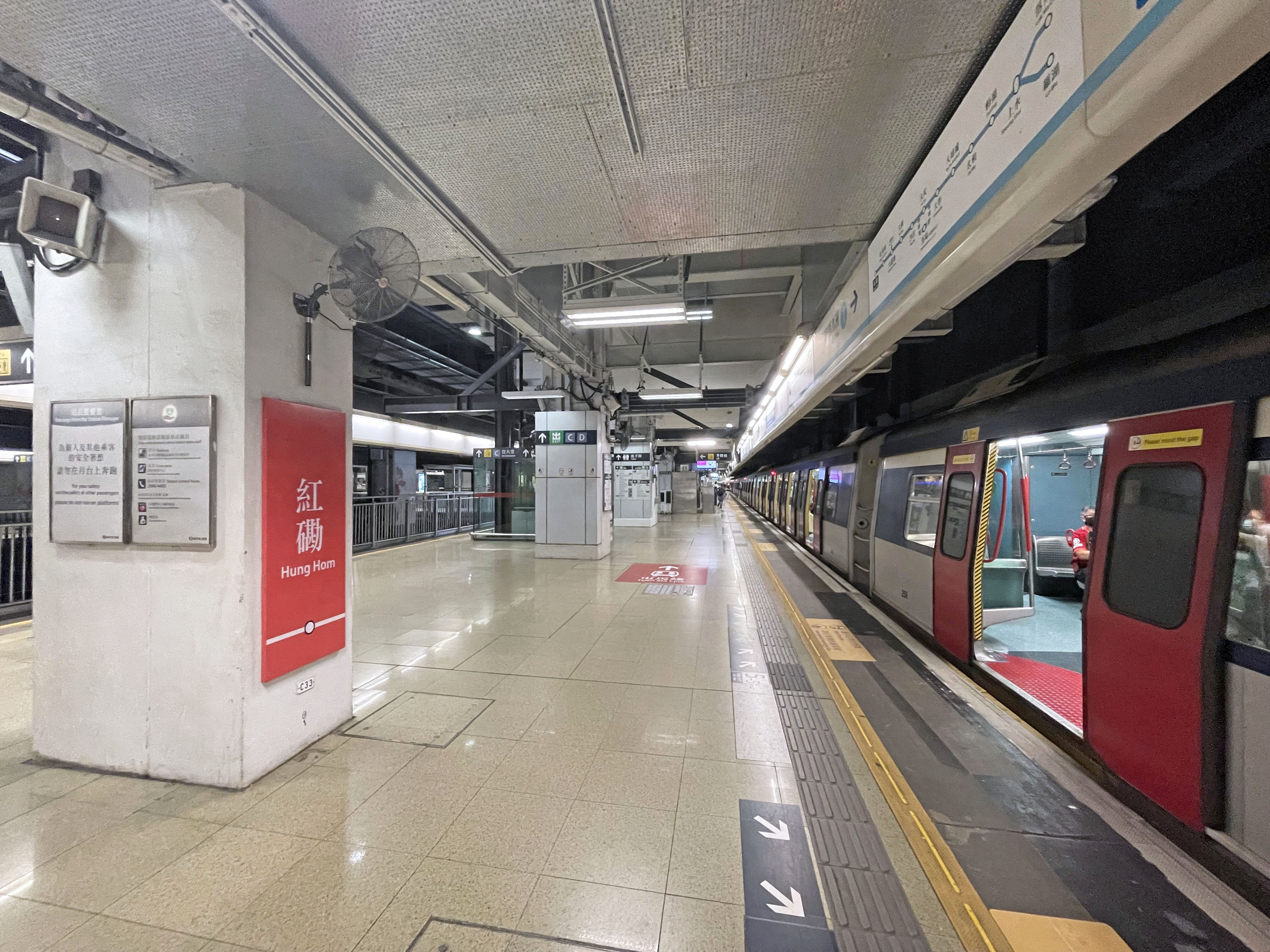
Now-defunct platform of Hung Hom station, which served as the southern terminus before the extension to Admiralty

In 2004, the railway was extended in tunnel to a new southern terminus at East Tsim Sha Tsui station. On 28 December 2004, a branch to the East Rail, the Ma On Shan Rail was added, with an interchange at Tai Wai.

On 15 August 2007, an extension from Sheung Shui station northwest through a tunnel to Lok Ma Chau station was opened. This provides a second border crossing between Hong Kong SAR and Mainland China.

=== Development under MTR Corporation ===
The Kowloon–Canton Railway (KCR) network, of which East Rail was part of, was amalgamated into the MTR system on 2 December 2007. The KCR East Rail was renamed the East Rail line. At that time, the line terminated at East Tsim Sha Tsui in the south, and Lo Wu / Lok Ma Chau in the north.

On 16 August 2009, Hung Hom became the southern endpoint of both the East Rail line and West Rail Line after the completion of the Kowloon Southern Link. The section of East Rail line between Hung Hom and East Tsim Sha Tsui was taken over by the West Rail line, with the latter station becoming an intermediate stop on West Rail line (now part of Tuen Ma line).

As the COVID-19 pandemic started to affect Hong Kong in early 2020, the Hong Kong government closed all border crossings on the land boundary with Mainland China, including the Lo Wu and Lok Ma Chau Spur Line control points, on 3 February. During the closure, Lo Wu station served only certified residents nearby, while passenger service at Lok Ma Chau was completely suspended. Northbound trains terminated at Sheung Shui for three years, until Lok Ma Chau crossing was reopened on 8 January 2023 following the lifting of travel restrictions. Lo Wu station reopened to cross-boundary passengers on 6 February 2023, after completion of renovation.

==== Shatin to Central Link project ====
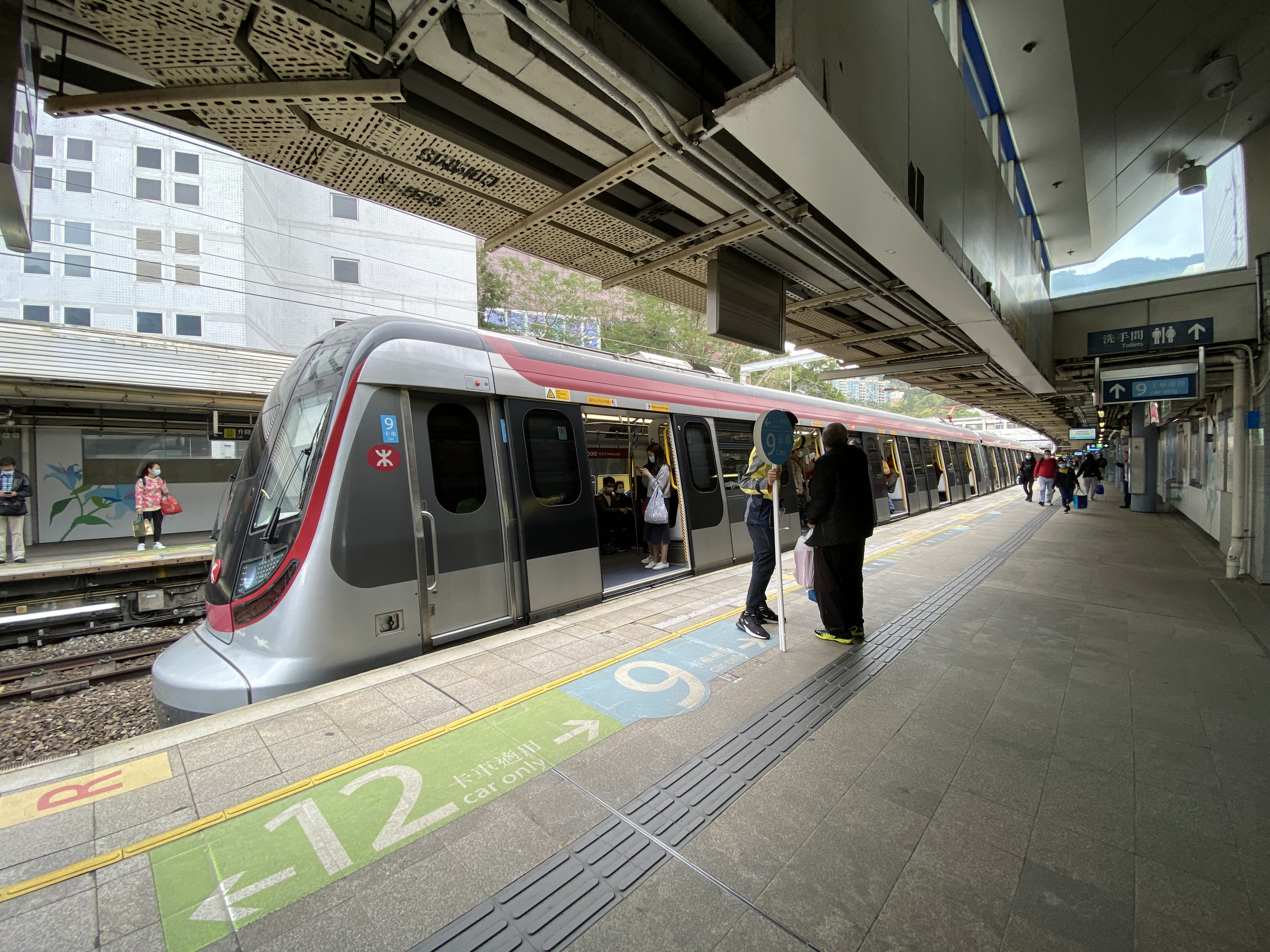
During the transitional "Mixed Fleet Operation" period, both 9-car and 12-car trains ran on the line simultaneously. Boarding positions for trains of different lengths were colour-coded for passengers' identification.

First conceived in 1967, the Shatin to Central Link (SCL) expansion project received approval in 2012, and began construction later in the same year. Phase 2 of the link is a southern extension of East Rail line which takes the line southward across Victoria Harbour to a new terminus, Admiralty station, on Hong Kong Island. The extension also includes an intermediate station at Exhibition.

In preparation for this extension, the TBL and ATO signalling systems in use on the East Rail line were replaced by the Trainguard MT communications-based train control system supplied by Siemens. The line also received new rolling stock in the form of 37 nine-car R-Trains, which would completely replace all existing trains used on the line. The new signalling system was slated to replace the old ones on 12 September 2020 and R-Trains would start carrying passengers on the same day, but one day before the changeover, the discovery of abnormalities that misrouted Lok Ma Chau bound trains into tracks towards Lo Wu on three occasions during the system reliability tests was revealed by a media report. The changeover of signalling systems was eventually postponed to 6 February 2021. From that day until 6 May 2022, East Rail line entered the stage of "Mixed Fleet Operation" (MFO) in which new 9-car trains were put to service, running alongside and gradually replacing the legacy 12-car Metro-Cammell EMUs (the SP1900 EMUs were removed from service on the line once MFO started).

Passenger services started on the cross-harbour extension on 15 May 2022. The extension allows New Territories East residents to reach the central business district in one train ride. During the first two weeks after the extension's commissioning, the patronage of the line's critical link, that is the section from Tai Wai to Kowloon Tong, during the busiest hour in the morning peak recorded a 27% increase from 26,000 to 33,100 pphpd. As the need to transfer from the line to other MTR lines (at Kowloon Tong or Hung Hom / East Tsim Sha Tsui) or cross-harbour tunnel buses (at Hung Hom) for destinations on Hong Kong Island is now eliminated, the new extension had relieved the critical links on Tsuen Wan line and Kwun Tong line of around 20% and 10% loading during morning peak, respectively.

The introduction of new trains and signalling systems under the SCL project presented an opportunity to improve the line's infrastructure. The local community had long fought for the retrofitting of automatic platform gates (APGs) on East Rail line platforms, yet the pre-SCL signalling system could not support their addition. As construction of the SCL project progressed, advance works for APGs installation including platform structure reinforcement was also carried out. A year after the cross-harbour extension opened, the installation of APGs formally commenced, with the first pairs of APGs at Racecourse and Tai Po Market stations putting into operation on 7 May and 3 June 2023, respectively. The installation on all the other remaining stations finished on 4 June 2025, with the final gate installation at Mong Kok East on May 23 2025.

=== Tunnels ===
Tunnels on the East Rail line have numbers assigned to them. When the railway was first opened, there were five tunnels:

1. North of today's Mong Kok East station
2. Beacon Hill Tunnel
3. South of where University station stands today
4. North of university station
5. At Tai Po Kau

During the construction of the Cross-Harbour Tunnel, which opened in 1972, the section of tracks near Oi Man Estate, Ho Man Tin was covered to construct the section of Princess Margaret Road connecting to the Cross-Harbour Tunnel. A new tunnel was therefore created and given the number 1A.

During the modernisation of the line in the early 1980s, Tunnels 1, 3, 4 were removed by demolishing the mounds above them. Tunnel 1A already had double track width when built; a completely new Beacon Hill Tunnel (Tunnel 2) was constructed and took over the original one; and Tunnel 5 was doubled. The new one is known as Tunnel 5A.

== Route ==
The East Rail Line is 46 km (29 mi) long and serves 16 stations en route. It is electrified with a 25 kV 50 Hz AC overhead line system.

The line runs north–south generally, starting in the Central District on Hong Kong Island and extending northwards towards the border with Mainland China. Its southern terminus is Admiralty station, a "mega-interchange" connecting to three other MTR running lines. From there, the line runs easterly under Wan Chai North, calling at Exhibition Centre station on the way. It then leaves Hong Kong Island, turns to a northerly direction, and traverses under Victoria Harbour in an immersed tube tunnel, arriving at the underground platforms at Hung Hom station. The route up until this point is known as the East Rail Line Cross-Harbour Extension, built as part of the Shatin to Central Link project.

The line then emerges from tunnel alongside Princess Margaret Road, cutting across the centre of Kowloon Peninsula on a mostly at-grade alignment, calling at two stations en route. After Kowloon Tong, the line leaves Kowloon and enter the New Territories through the Beacon Hill Tunnel.

In Sha Tin New Town, it makes four station calls, running parallel to Shing Mun River. Just before Fo Tan station, a parallel branch line diverges from the main line; on Sha Tin Racecourse race days, some passenger trains miss Fo Tan and serve Racecourse station on the branch line instead. Between the branch line and the main line is Ho Tung Lau Depot where the line’s trains are stabled and maintained. The branch line rejoins the main line right after the depot.

From University station, the line runs side by side with Tolo Highway, roughly following the natural coastline of Tolo Harbour (parts of which have since been reclaimed to form the Hong Kong Science Park and Pak Shek Kok. The line calls at two stations within Tai Po New Town, then proceed through the rural areas around Hong Lok Yuen and Kau Lung Hang into the Fanling–Sheung Shui New Town, where two station calls are to be made.

The line bifurcates right after Sheung Shui station. The main line extends northwards at-grade to reach Lo Wu station, where East Rail line domestic trains terminate; the original Kowloon–Canton Railway trackage continues into Shenzhen through the steel truss Lo Wu Bridge over Sham Chun River but no trains ordinarily use it since through trains were replaced by high speed rail services. On the other hand, the Lok Ma Chau Spur Line travels westwards in tunnel underneath the Long Valley wetlands and the upcoming Kwu Tung North New Town, before emerging from underground onto a viaduct to reach the Lok Ma Chau terminus. Both Lo Wu and Lok Ma Chau stations are within the Frontier Closed Area and only genuine border-crossing passengers and authorised persons are allowed access.

== Rolling stock ==
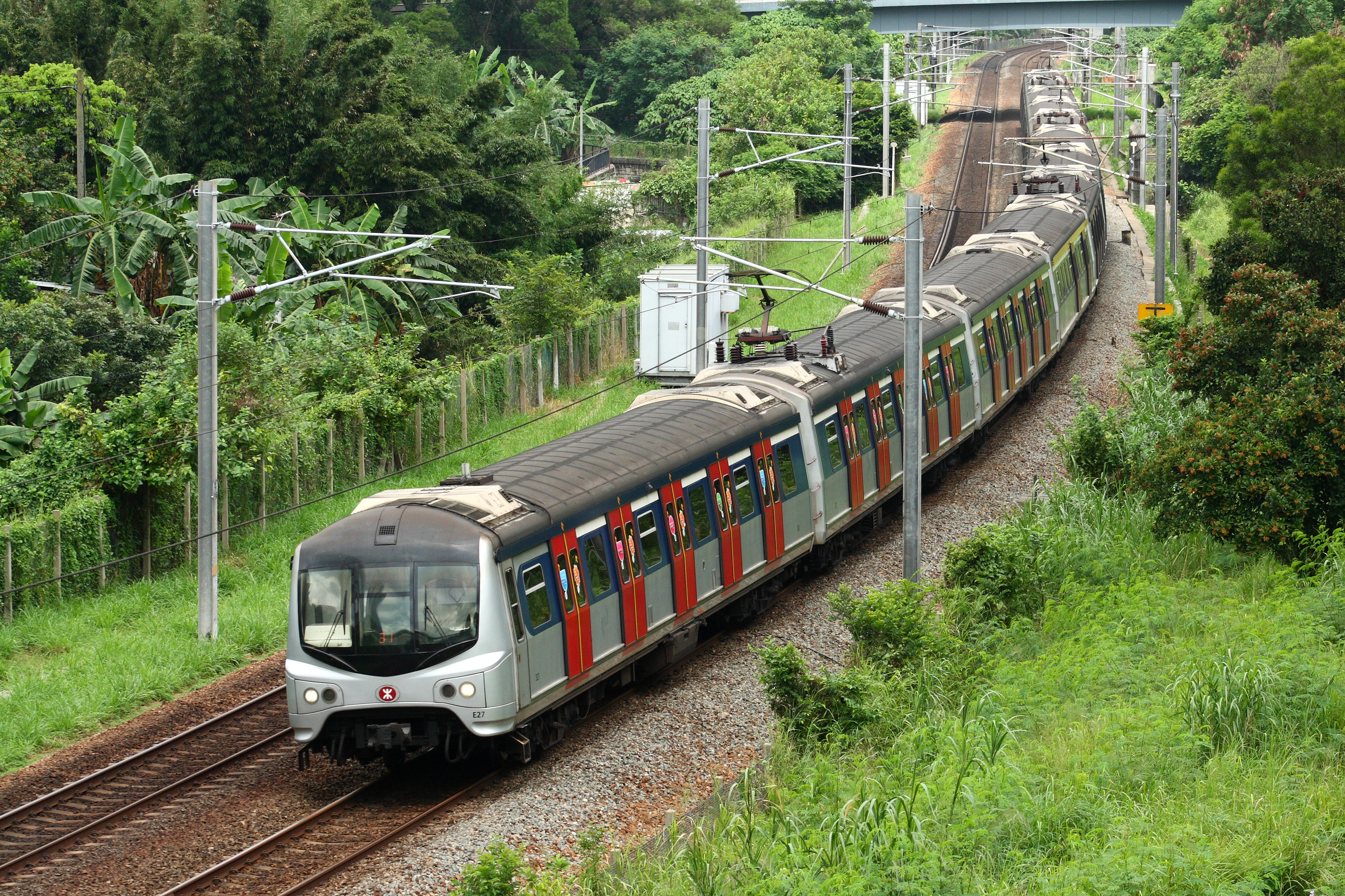
A Metro Cammell MLR EMU in rebuilt form. These trains served the East Rail line until May 2022.

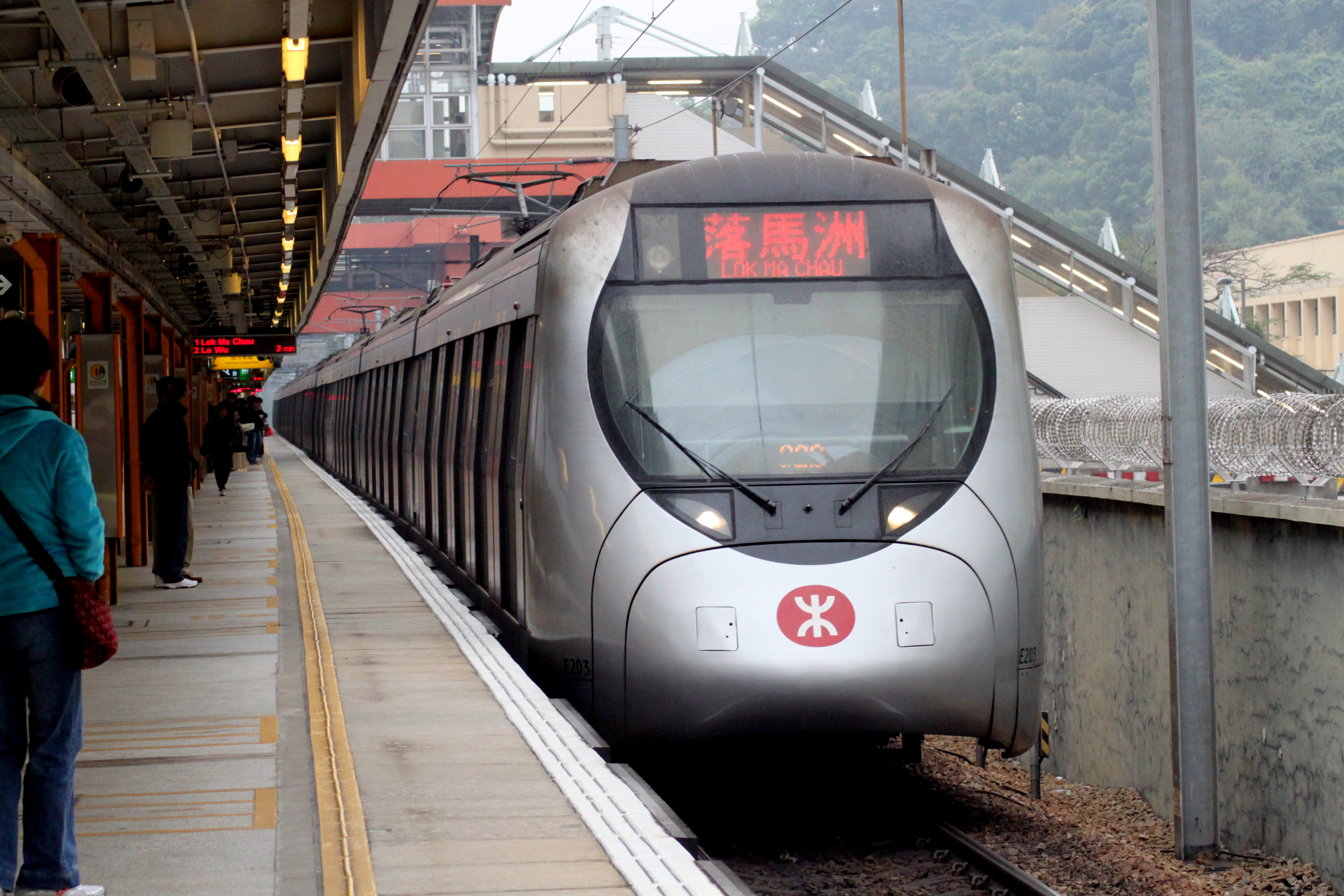
SP1900 EMU at Fo Tan station; these trains were withdrawn from East Rail line service on 6 February 2021.

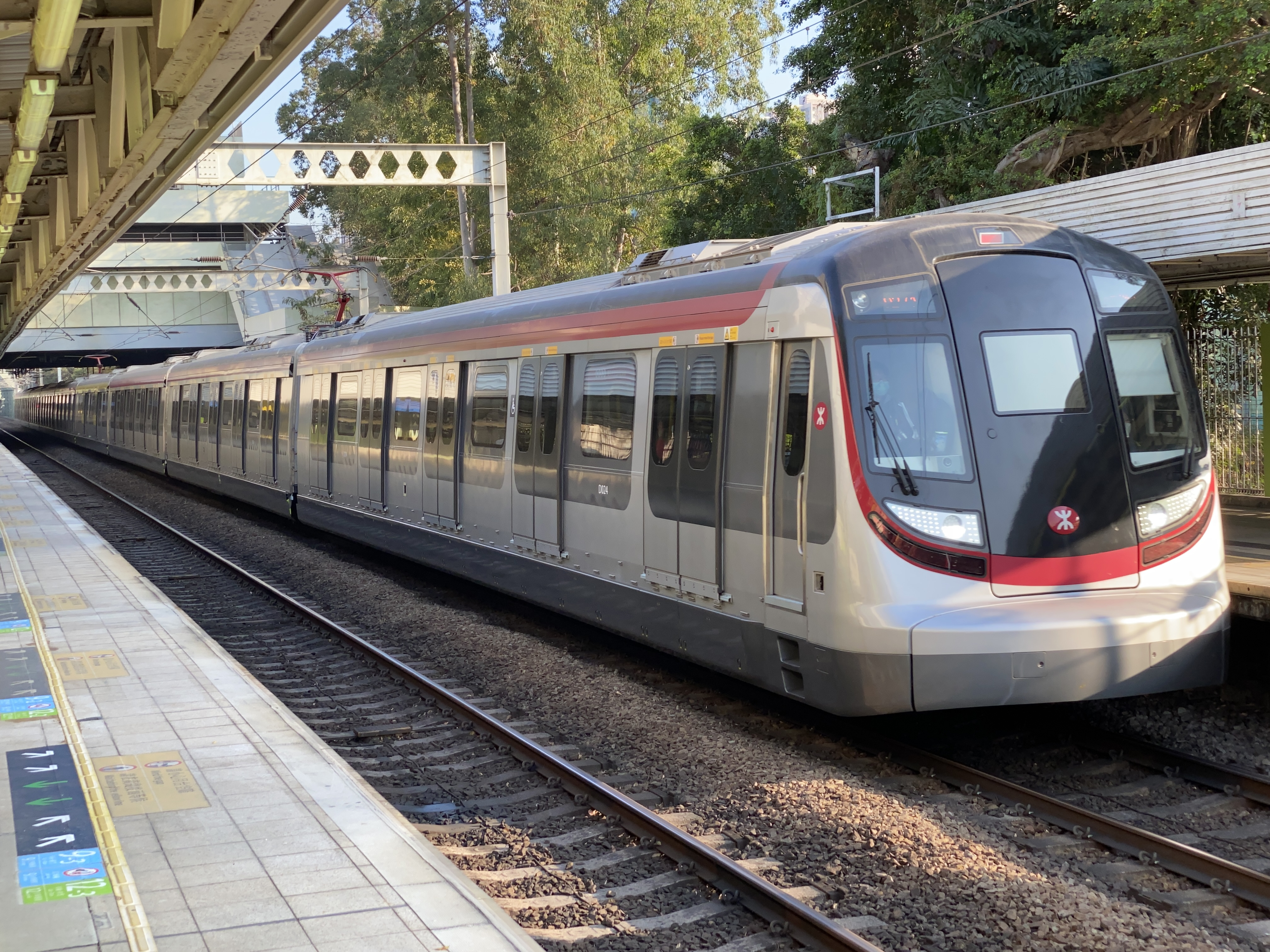
Hyundai Rotem EMU at Fanling station; these trains replaced the MLR and SP1900 EMU trains.

The line is currently served solely by nine-car R-Stock trains built by Hyundai Rotem, which entered service on 6 February 2021. Thirty-seven sets were built by Hyundai Rotem between 2014 and 2022.

Before the introduction of the new R-Stock trains, the East Rail line was operated with two types of commuter trains: the 29 refurbished Metro-Cammell EMUs (also known as Mid-Life Refurbished Trains) and eight sets of the newer SP1900 EMUs, manufactured by Kinki Sharyo of Japan in 2001. Both models shared the same exterior colour scheme, door arrangement (five pairs per car, except first class), as well as consisting of 12 carriages per train including a first class section. The interior design between the two models is different, and the transverse seating near the ends of the Metro-Cammell carriages has been replaced with longitudinal seating in the Kinki Sharyo models to allow for a wider gangway between compartments. All of the East Rail line Hyundai-Rotem trains are maintained at Ho Tung Lau Depot in Sha Tin.

With the construction of the Sha Tin to Central Link, which cannot accommodate trains of greater than nine cars, the MTR decided in December 2012 to phase out all of the aging Metro-Cammell trains from 2020 and replace them with 37 sets of 9-car R-Stock trains built by Hyundai Rotem of South Korea. In 2020, the MTR purchased an additional 6 trains bringing the total number to 43 sets. The first new train arrived in Hong Kong in September 2015 and entered service in February 2021. They fully replaced the older fleet in time for the opening of the Hung Hom to Admiralty section of the Sha Tin to Central Link on 15 May 2022. Due to the shorter train length, there are concerns that the new formation may worsen the existing overcrowding problem. However, the Transport and Housing Bureau and MTRC suggest that the new signaling system and higher train speeds will increase the train frequency from three minutes down to two minutes. It is also estimated that with the completion of the Sha Tin to Central Link (Tai Wai – Hung Hom section), 20% of the current East Rail line passengers will take the new East West Corridor.

The SP1900 EMUs were withdrawn from the East Rail line on 6 February 2021 and, together with the SP1900/1950 sets on the West Rail and Ma On Shan lines, were subsequently reconfigured as 8-car trains to serve the Tuen Ma line. The conversion project took place at MTR's Pat Heung Depot and converted sets were later placed into service on the Tuen Ma line alongside newly delivered CRRC Changchun TML C-trains (nicknamed as the pseudo-SP1900 due to its similarity to the SP1900). The SP1900 first class cars were shipped back to Kinki Sharyo factory in Osaka, Japan for conversion into standard-class compartments. The Metro-Cammell EMUs retired on 6 May 2022 after 40 years of service, with the last train leaving Hung Hom at 13:00, departing for Sha Tin, and ending service there to a large crowd who took the train.

MTR East Rail line Rolling stock
Model	Manufactured	Time of manufacturing	Sets	Formation	Notes
R-Train	Hyundai Rotem	2014-2022	43	D-P-M+M-P-F+M-P-D	Replaced all the MLR trains
MTR East Rail line Former rolling stock
Model	Manufactured	Time in operation	Sets	Formation	Notes
MLR Train	Metro-Cammell	06/05/1982–06/05/2022	29	1-2-5+6-2-5+6-2-4+6-2-3; 1-2-5-5-2-6+6-2-4+6-2-3	All 29 train sets have been retired and replaced by the R-Trains
IKK Train	Kinki Sharyo and Kawasaki Heavy Industries	04/09/2001–05/02/2021	8	D-P-M-H+C-H+M-P+F-M-P-D	Now used on the Tuen Ma line

=== First class ===
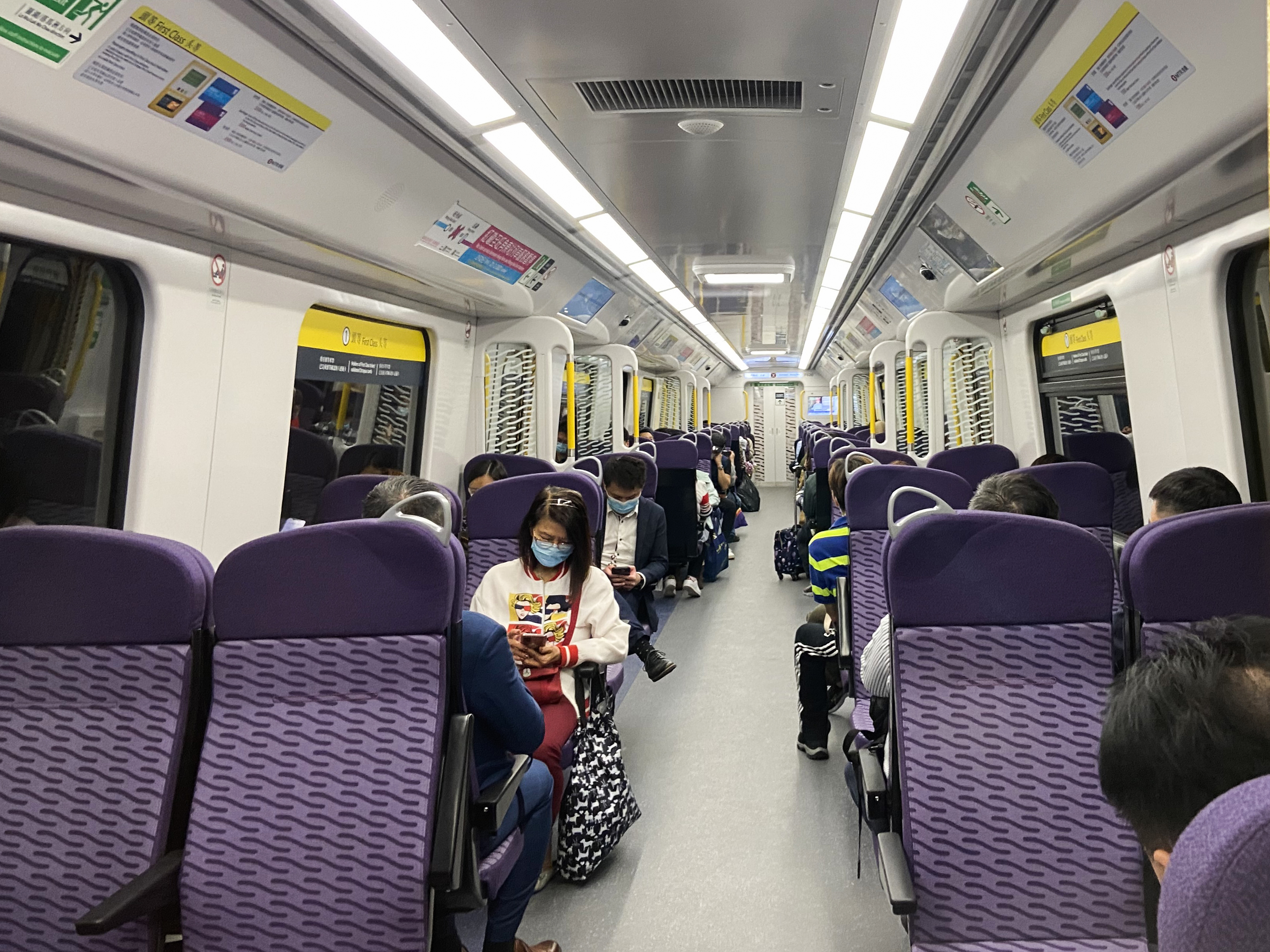
First Class area in Hyundai Rotem EMU on the East Rail line

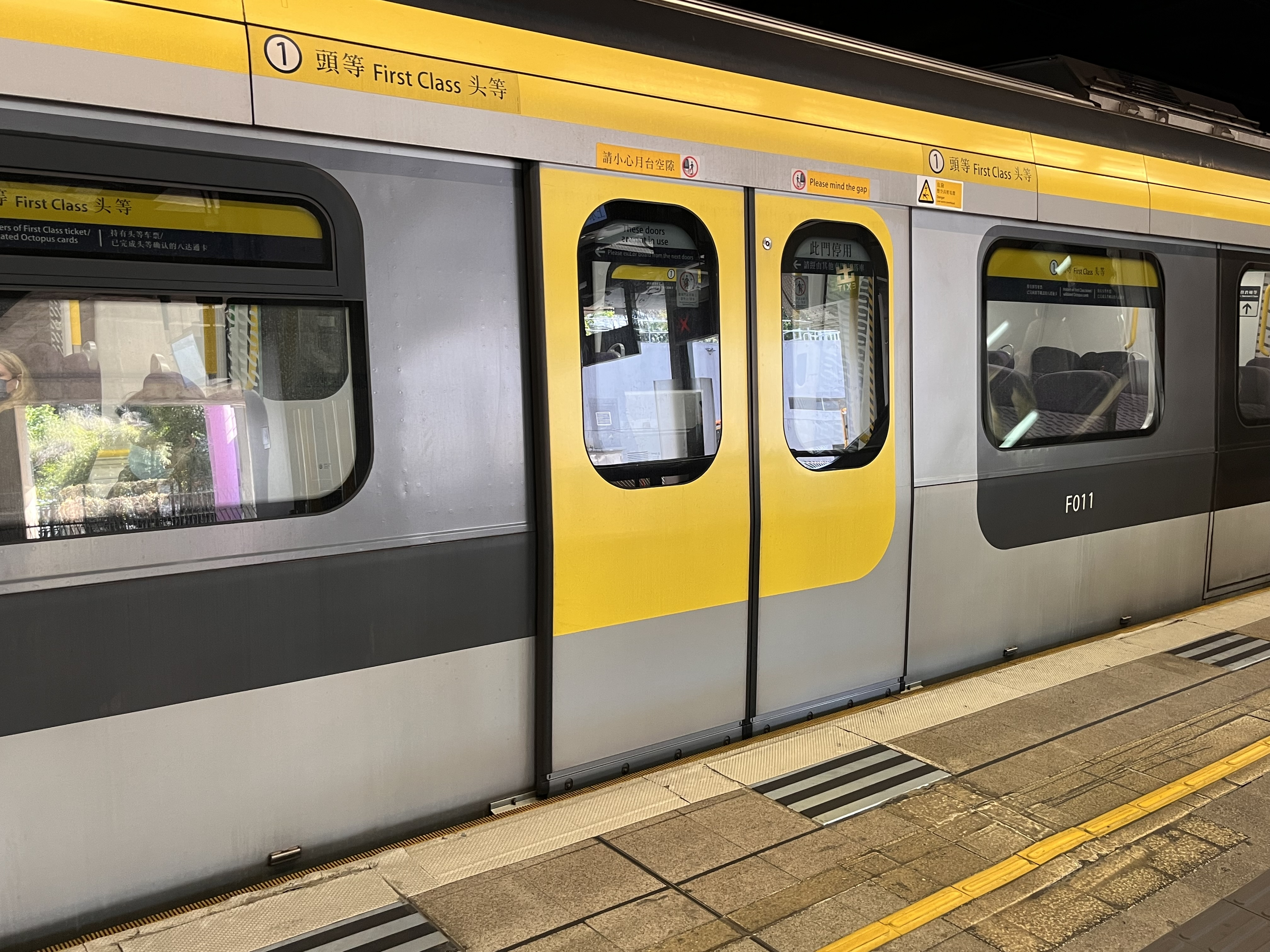
The exterior of first class compartments is painted yellow.

The East Rail line is the only railway in Hong Kong to offer first class commuter service. One car of each train is designated as a first class carriage (Northbound Car No.4 and Southbound Car No.6). These compartments have softer and wider seat arrangements; however, standing in the first class car is common during rush hour.

Riding on this carriage costs twice that of a standard-class journey and passengers are required to buy the first class ticket (at the vending machine on East Rail line stations or ticket counters at the other stations) or revalidate their Octopus cards on the first class reader (located at the station platforms and beside the gangway door of the First class compartment itself) before entering the first-class car. Ticket Inspectors will perform random checks on train, and passengers failing to produce a valid first class ticket or validated Octopus Card will be liable to a surcharge of $1000.

== Train service ==
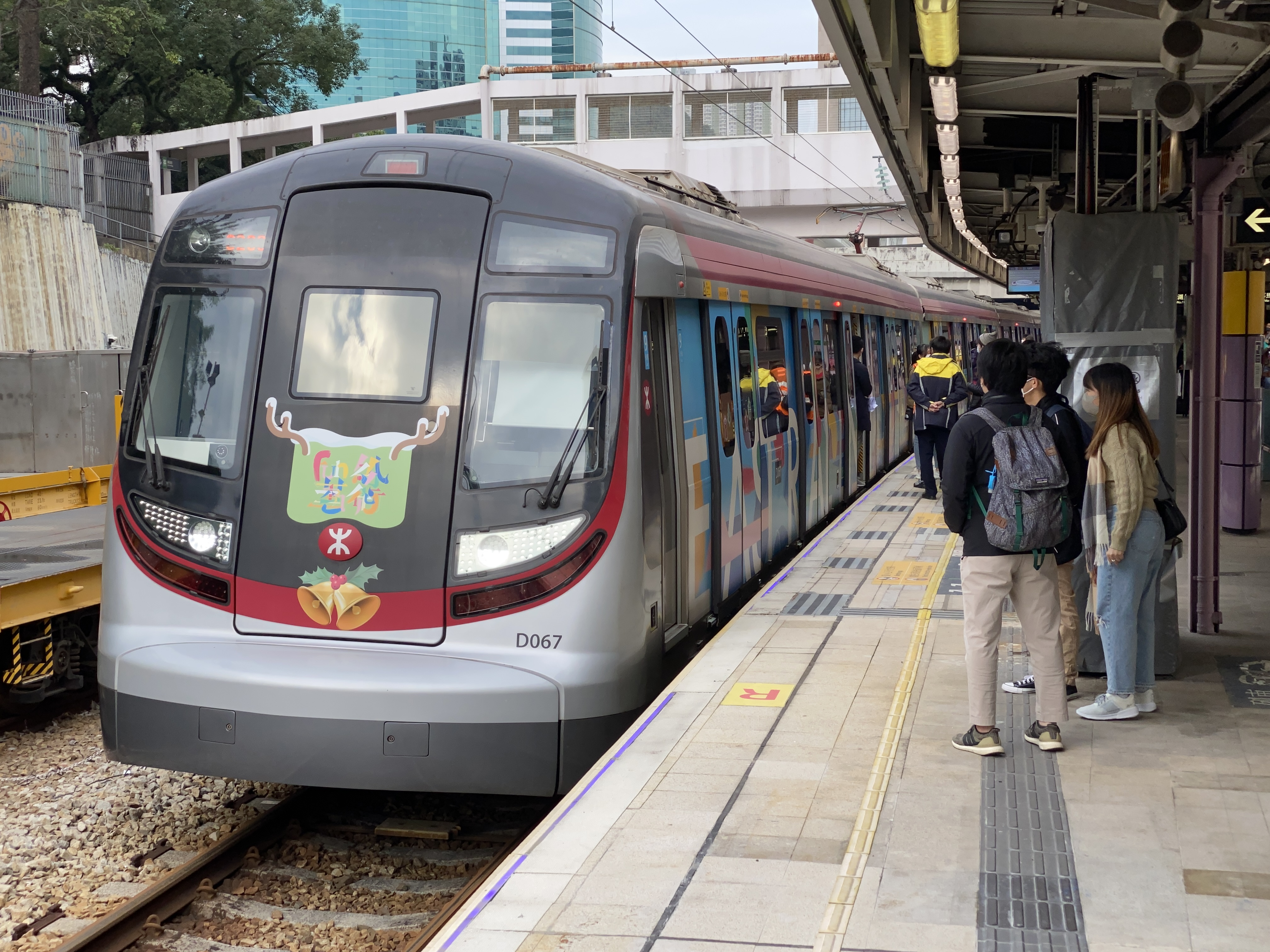
Northbound trains may terminate at Sha Tin station's Platform 1.

Domestic trains on the East Rail line operate from around 05:30 to 01:00 the next day, running at around 3–8 minute intervals for most part of the day. Trains operate at roughly 15–16 trains per hour (tph) per direction off-peak, and drops to a minimum of 6 tph during early morning and late night hours. Most trains serve between Admiralty and Lo Wu or Lok Ma Chau, with one train to Lok Ma Chau following two trains to Lo Wu. However, Lo Wu and Lok Ma Chau stations close at approximately 00:30 the next day and 23:00 respectively, which means that Sheung Shui is the northern terminus after both border checkpoints are closed.

During peak hours, trains are more frequent, running every 2–3 minutes. Between Sheung Shui and Admiralty, there are 20 tph during morning peak, bringing the train frequency up to 2.7-3.8 minute intervals. Additional short-haul trains would also depart from Tai Po Market and Sha Tin, augmenting the number of trains south of Sha Tin to 23 tph.

The line's usual service patterns on non-race days could be summarised as follows:-

- Lo Wu– Admiralty
- Lok Ma Chau– Admiralty
- Sheung Shui – Admiralty (additional trips are also operated during morning peak)
- Tai Po Market– Admiralty (around 5 pairs during weekday morning peak; 2 southbound trips in the afternoon)
- Sha Tin– Admiralty (operated by trains leaving/returning to Ho Tung Lau Depot; 1 pair during morning peak; northbound trips also run in the evening)
- Sheung Shui– Hung Hom (northbound trips in early morning before first Lo Wu bound train from Admiralty arrives; last few southbound trips at late night terminating at Hung Hom station Platform 4 and Platform 1 (last train); early morning trips before first southbound train from Lo Wu arrive at Sha Tin)
- Lok Ma Chau – Hung Hom (northbound trips in early morning before first Lok Ma Chau bound train from Admiralty arrives; early morning trips before first southbound train from Lok Ma Chau arrive at Sha Tin)

Racecourse station is only open to passenger traffic during horse racing meetings at the Sha Tin Racecourse, during which some trains would be channelled through Racecourse instead of calling at the parallel Fo Tan station. Trains terminating at Racecourse might also be operated.

=== Cross-boundary train services ===
==== Train services to boundary crossings ====
Both Lo Wu and Lok Ma Chau stations are integrated with immigration control points between Hong Kong and Mainland China. The two stations are located within the Frontier Closed Area (FCA) and access is restricted to genuine boundary-crossing passengers with a valid travel document, and nearby residents holding Closed Area Permits.

Journeys to and from the cross-boundary stations (except approved FCA residents holding a Railcard) are charged at a premium, the proceeds of which is used to cross-subsidise fares of domestic journeys to a certain extent.

==== Intercity Through Train ====
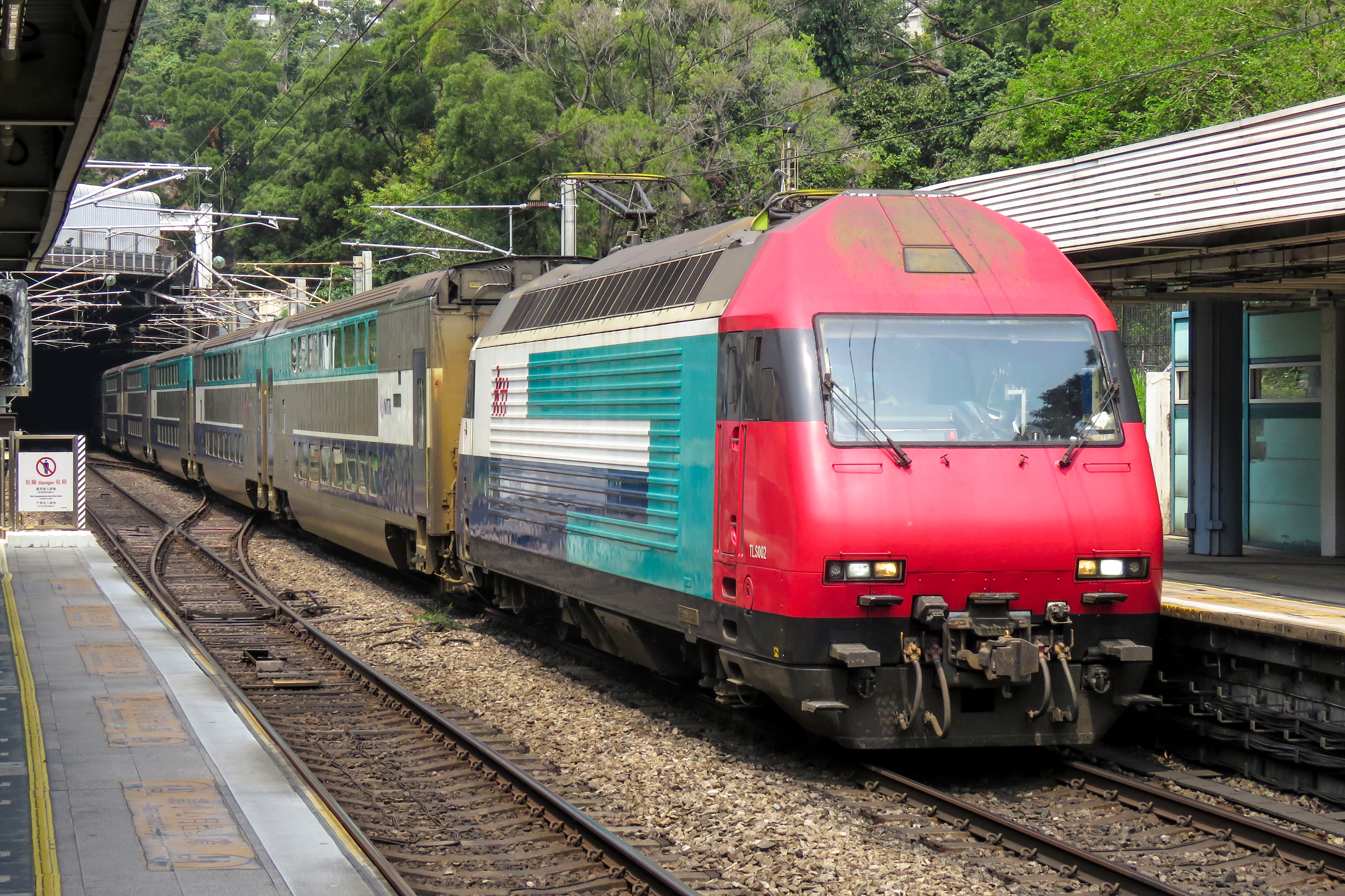
KTT, the sole Intercity Through Train operated by MTR

Prior to the COVID-19 pandemic, the Intercity Through Train (Chinese: 城際直通車) service shared tracks with East Rail line domestic service between Hung Hom and Lo Wu. These intercity trains ran across the Hong Kong–China border and proceed to Guangzhou, Shanghai and Beijing in Mainland China. Intercity trains did not call at stations in Hong Kong apart from the Hung Hom terminus, where both inbound and outbound passengers complete their Hong Kong immigration and customs clearance.

In July 2020, all of the Intercity Through Train routes has been permanently discontinued. As the demand for long-distance train service has been catered to by the new Guangzhou-Shenzhen-Hong Kong XRL which opened 2018, there are currently no plans to resume the Intercity Through Train service despite the reopening of the border in 2023.

== Stations ==
This is a list of the stations on the East Rail line.

Livery	Station name		Image	Interchange; Adjacent transport	Opening	District
Livery	English	Chinese	Image	Interchange; Adjacent transport	Opening	District
East Rail Line (EAL)
	Admiralty	金鐘		Island line; Tsuen Wan line; South Island line	15 May 2022	Central and Western
	Exhibition Centre	會展		Tseung Kwan O line (Under planning; to be part of North Island line) (Note: Exhibition Centre station and Wan Chai station (on the Island line) are not physically connected. There is pedestrian transfer via a footbridge.)	15 May 2022	Wan Chai
	Hung Hom formerly Kowloon	紅磡		Tuen Ma line; ~~Through Train services to Mainland China~~ (service halted indefinitely in 2020; formally disused in 2024)	30 November 1975 platforms moved on 15 May 2022	Yau Tsim Mong
	Mong Kok East formerly Yaumati; Mong Kok	旺角東		— (Note: Mong Kok East station and Mong Kok station (on the Tsuen Wan line and Kwun Tong line) are not physically connected. There is pedestrian transfer via a footbridge; the journey time is approximately 10–15 minutes on foot.)	1 October 1910	Yau Tsim Mong
	Kowloon Tong	九龍塘		Kwun Tong line	4 May 1982	Sham Shui Po / Kowloon City
	Tai Wai	大圍		Tuen Ma line	15 August 1983 relocated 23 April 1986	Sha Tin
	Sha Tin	沙田		—	1 October 1910	Sha Tin
	Fo Tan (Note: Fo Tan and Racecourse are parallel stations. Racecourse station is only open when horseracing or a special event is held at Sha Tin Racecourse.)	火炭		—	15 February 1985	Sha Tin
	Racecourse	馬場		—	7 October 1978	Sha Tin
	University formerly Ma Liu Shui	大學		—	24 September 1956	Sha Tin
	Tai Po Market	大埔墟		—	1 October 1910 relocated 7 April 1983	Tai Po
	Tai Wo	太和		—	9 May 1989	Tai Po
	Fanling	粉嶺		—	1 October 1910	North
	Sheung Shui	上水		—	16 May 1930	North
	Lo Wu	羅湖		Through Border Checkpoint: Luohu: 1; Renmin South: 9; Shenzhen railway station	14 October 1949	North
Lok Ma Chau Spur line
	Kwu Tung	古洞		Northern Link (2034)	2027 (expected)	North
	Lok Ma Chau (Note: Lok Ma Chau is the only station on the Lok Ma Chau Spur line, a branch of the line northwards from Sheung Shui station.)	落馬洲		Through Border Checkpoint: Futian Checkpoint: 4 10	15 August 2007	Yuen Long

=== Notes ===
In May 2008, MTR announced plans to renew many stations, some of which have been in service for over half a century. Refurbishment is not expected to be fully completed until 2016 at the earliest.

There are long distances between University and Tai Po Market stations, between Tai Wo and Fanling stations, and between Sheung Shui and Lok Ma Chau stations; and there are no intermediate stations within these sections. These sections of track are nearby the Science Park, Tai Po Kau, Hong Lok Yuen, Kau Lung Hang village, and Kwu Tung village. However, intermediate stations within some sections of the track are under planning.

== Safety ==
The East Rail line is Hong Kong's oldest heavy railway (as opposed to the tramways). While generally regarded as very safe, the railway suffered some serious incidents during its history.

=== Train accidents ===
At about 11:00 on 14 June 1923, a train derailed at Ma Liu Shui due to a landslide following heavy rain. The locomotive and one coach derailed and slid down the embankment to the edge of Tide Cove. Nobody was injured.

The same locomotive involved in the 1923 incident was involved in a more serious derailment on 20 April 1931. Owing to heavy rains, an embankment at Ma Liu Shui south of today's University station was weakened. It collapsed as a Kowloon-bound train passed over it at about 17:10, causing the locomotive and four carriages to crash and pile atop one another. There were 12 deaths and eight serious injuries.

On 12 November 1955, a fatal accident occurred at Mile 17 1/4, the site of a private military level crossing. A speeding passenger train struck a British military "Comet" tank at the crossing. A new diesel electric locomotive, the Sir Alexander (now exhibited in the Hong Kong Railway Museum), derailed. Various other carriages were severely damaged. The train guard and a member of the tank crew were killed.

At 15:00 on 18 December 1980, a contractor building Mong Kok (now Mong Kok East) station accidentally severed signalling cables, disabling the automatic signalling system. At this time, the railway had been only partly doubled-tracked, and still made use of the old single-track Beacon Hill Tunnel. Later in the day, two trains were inadvertently put on a head-on collision course just south of the tunnel. At 18:40, a Lo Wu-bound train carrying about 1,500 passengers reached the point where the double-tracked section of the railway ended ahead of the tunnel, near Yau Yat Chuen. A safety device, a trap point, prevented the collision by forcing the train to derail, causing minor injuries to some passengers. A minute later, a southbound train came to a screeching halt at the accident site. A KCR spokesman blamed "a misunderstanding in a telephone communication".

On 25 November 1984, a train derailed between Sheung Shui and Lo Wu stations. The incident occurred when the driver, meaning to back the train up to Sheung Shui station, failed to follow a speed/stop signal while the train was exceeding the speed limit. The train was being driven from the rear cabin, with the driver relying on signals from the train guard who was in the front carriage. The train sped past a danger signal onto a siding at 30 km/h, rather than shunting onto the main line at 10 km/h as it was meant to. It crashed into a concrete buffer at the end of the siding, with the first two cars piling on top of each other. The damage was so severe that the cars never returned to service. Passengers had been unloaded prior to the crash while the two KCR employees escaped significant injury. However, the accident caused train services to be suspended for the rest of the day and the incident spurred a series of public outcries concerning railway safety. The KCR determined that the accident occurred due to human error and not any system failure, suspended the driver, and changed procedures such that drivers were required to operate the train from the front carriage while shunting at Sheung Shui.

In 1988, there were numerous separate incidents of Chinese freight trains derailing on the railway. On 28 May, a locomotive and a goods wagon jumped the tracks near Fo Tan station, blocking the line. Services were temporarily detoured through Racecourse station. On 4 June, a wagon derailed near University station, again blocking the line. Coupled with a lorry accident in the Lion Rock Tunnel the same day, Kowloon and Sha Tin were thrown into "traffic chaos". On 2 July, another goods wagon derailed on a siding in Lo Wu after arriving from Shenzhen. As it was being hauled to the Fo Tan workshop at 1:44 am the following day for examination, it derailed again, though damage to the tracks was minor. Nobody was injured in the above incidents. The problems were attributed to uneven loading of the freight trains, sharply curved trackage "unideal" for the freight wagons, and the structural characteristics of the Chinese trains. In response, KCRC carried out track improvements and liaised with the Guangzhou Railway Administration. At the time, the KCRC handled 6.25 million freight wagons per year, so the derailments were relatively isolated occurrences.

In the early morning of 31 May 1989, diesel locomotive L57 collided head-on with locomotive L56 at Mongkok (now Mong Kok East) station, causing injuries to four KCR staff. Three employees in L57 were taking the locomotive from Kowloon (now Hung Hom) station to Fo Tan for repairs. The locomotive ran a red signal and struck the stationary L56 while traveling at about 50 km/h. Chan Yau-keung, a KCRC construction supervisor, was critically injured and died on 8 June at Kwong Wah Hospital. He had been standing between the driver Ko Yuk-ching and co-driver Lee Kam-ming, both of whom were seated. Ko was a qualified driver while Lee, an assistant operator, was operating under Ko's supervision. Lee was driving at the time of the accident, but was seated in the left of the cabin and could not see the signals, which were on the right and were obscured by the long hood of the vehicle. According to procedures, Lee had to rely on Ko to relay him the status of the signals. Ko, speaking at an inquest following the accident, stated that he had felt dizzy and could not recall what colours the signals displayed. The advance warning system (AWS) of locomotive L57, which would have automatically halted the train, was switched off. KCR officers in the control centre saw the impending collision but could not warn the crew as the L57 radio was switched off.

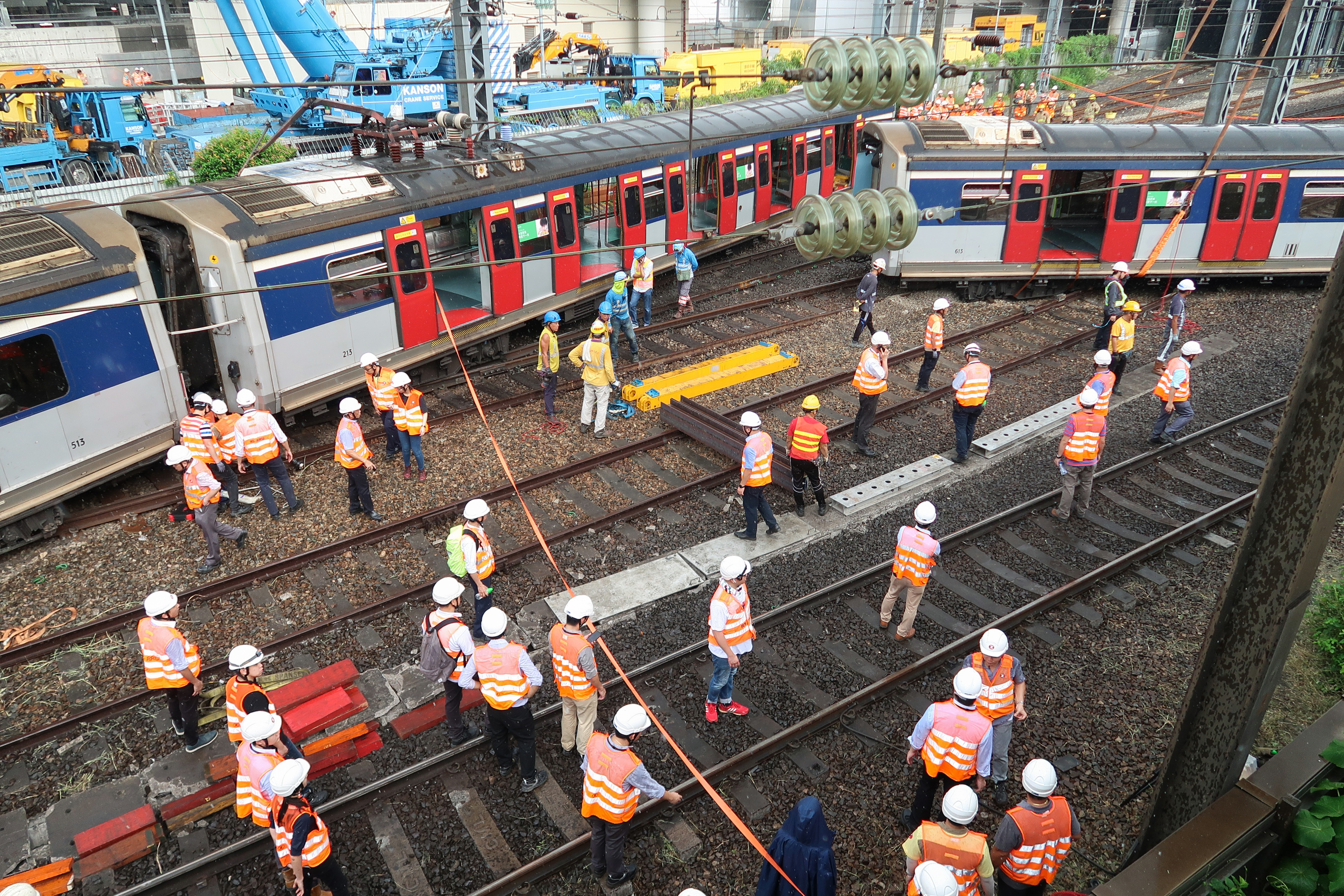
A Metro-Cammell EMU derailed at Hung Hom station on 17 September 2019.

On 17 September 2019 at 08:32, East Rail service L094 carrying around 500 passengers derailed while approaching Platform 1 of Hung Hom station, injuring eight passengers, with five of whom hospitalised. Cars 4 to 6 were derailed, with cars 4 and 5 disconnected, while cars 1-3 and 7-12 remained on the track. An independent investigation by the Electrical and Mechanical Services Department revealed the cause of the derailment to be a widened track gauge due to the deterioration of the railway sleeper. Sleepers (35-36) of turnout P5116 were found to have been rotted and the screw hole deformed and enlarged. This significantly weakened the ability of the sleepers to be secured to the baseplate and thus maintain proper track gauge. In addition, under the dynamic stress load of the train running over it, the track widened excessively. Sections of the track, including check rails, were found broken and cracked. It was found that four earlier trains that entered Hung Hom station on that morning before service L094 had also suffered hit marks on their wheels. Track sections between 17 sleepers in turnout P5116 exceeded the safety limit of 1,455 mm (the designed track gauge was 1,435 mm). The investigation recommended the installation of real-time monitoring equipment to improve the surveillance of track conditions so that an improved maintenance regime could prevent similar events from occurring in the future.

=== Underframe cracking ===
On 21 December 2005, a Metro Cammell EMU failed while in operation. Following examination of the train, KCRC staff detected minor cracks in the welding of mounting brackets for some underframe components. A review panel commissioned by KCRC looked into the problem from four aspects:

- the rate of change of the acceleration and deceleration of trains
- the welding of components' mounting brackets
- the profile of the track and train wheels
- suspension system

Since the full introduction of automatic train operation (ATO) on the East Rail system in 2003, the rate of change of acceleration and deceleration resulting from ATO driving added stress to the underframe components. To allow a root cause investigation to be carried out, the use of the ATO system was suspended on 15 January 2006, leaving the operation of trains back in the hands of the train drivers, the safety of train operation under the control of the automatic train protection system. This resulted in a decreased frequency (from 24 to 23 trains per hour) and lengthened trip time (increase by 90 seconds to 42.5 minutes). KCRC also temporarily transferred some staff from West Rail to cope with recent maintenance of trains.

The Environment, Transport and Works Bureau reprimanded the KCRC for not immediately notifying the Government when it found problems with its East Rail trains in 2005. Secretary for the Bureau Dr. Sarah Liao said she had ordered the KCRC to inspect all its trains, and did not rule out suspending services if there were safety doubts. Dr. Liao ordered the chairman to review the corporation's operations, including its management and overall system, and submit a report. KCRC chairman Michael Tien accepted responsibility for the corporation's poor judgement in not sharing the information with the public in a timely matter.

On 21 January 2006, Michael Tien stated that the safety problems of East Rail had been controlled, and the train service was expected to operate as usual, including train service in the Chinese New Year. KCRC East Rail trains reverted to the ATO operation on 6 August 2006, after the investigation confirmed that the ATO system was not a direct cause of the cracking.

=== Platform gaps ===
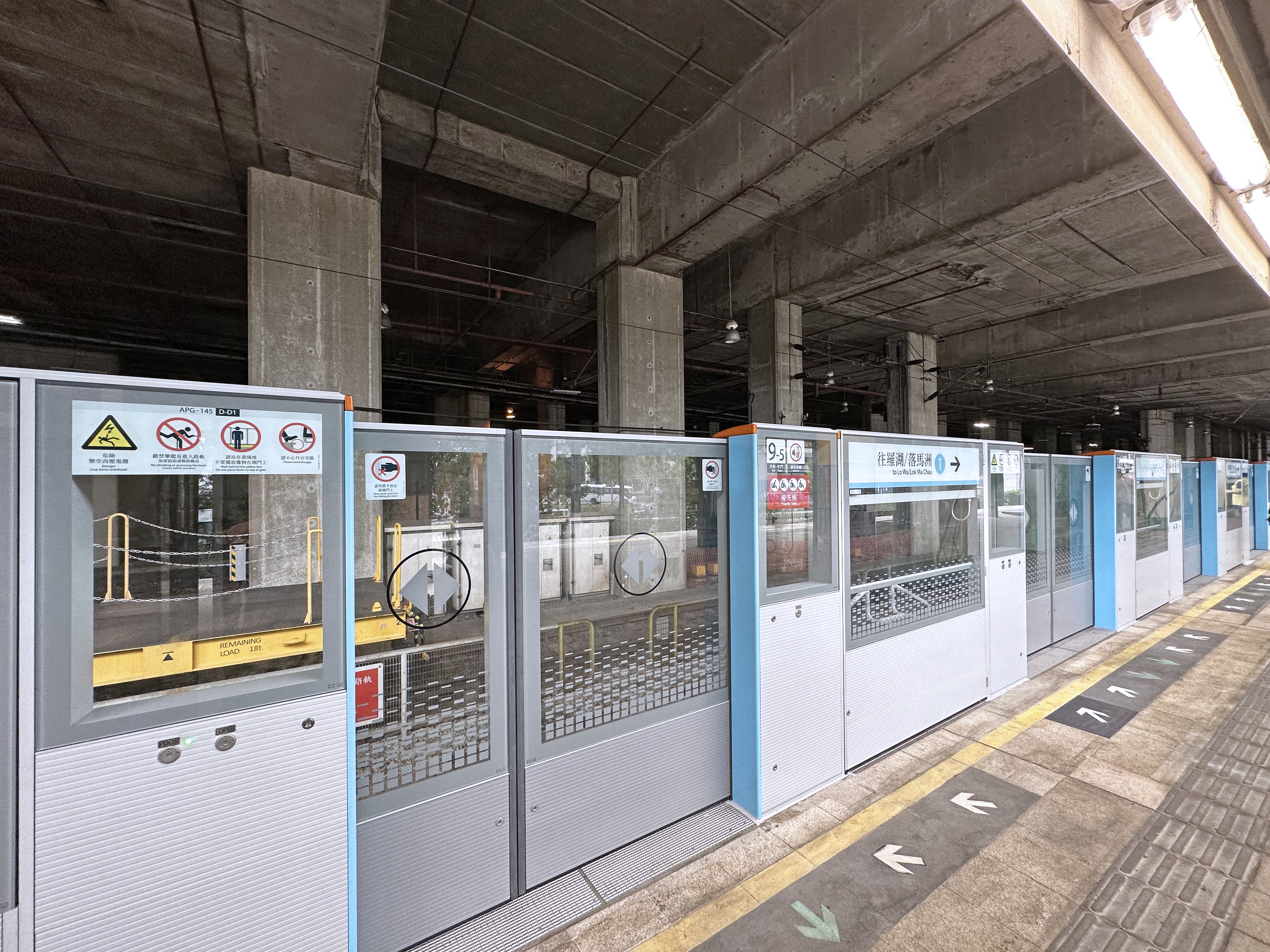
Half-height automatic platform gates (APGs) installed on Racecourse station's platform

The wide platform gap at several stations (namely Lo Wu, Tai Wo, University, Kowloon Tong, and Mong Kok East) is a safety concern. The KCRC has visually marked the "Gap Black Spots" on the platforms of those stations and stated that plates will be installed in the gap between the train and station. The platform gap is mainly caused by the curvature of the station and how the train enters the station area. A mechanical gap filler system, which extends the platform edge when a train is stopped at the station, was trialed at Lo Wu station in 2008–2009, yet it was not pursued due to poor reliability during inclement weather and high failure rate.

After two incidents of children falling onto the tracks at University station in 1985, the issue was discussed in the Legislative Council. The Secretary for Transport asserted that the gaps were within "international safety limits", and that the gap could not be narrowed due to the curvature of the station as well as the "rather wider bodies" of the Chinese through trains which run through the station daily. A man who fractured his leg boarding a train at University station in 2008 asserted that he fell into a gap of about 35 cm, while the MTR claimed it was only 22 cm at the relevant section of platform.

The new MTR R-Stock trains have wider compartments than the older East Rail line rolling stock, therefore narrowing the gap. Also, due to the decrease in train lengths from twelve cars to nine cars, trains will stop at less curved sections of the platforms. MTR suggests that the width of the gap will be similar to that of the urban lines.

In 2013, the MTR Corporation announced its intention to retrofit half-height automatic platform gates (APGs) on East Rail line platforms as part of the Shatin to Central Link (SCL) project. This would involve the installation of about 1,600 pairs of gates at 13 at-grade or elevated stations along the line, starting from Racecourse and Tai Po Market. However, the actual installation of APGs was not technically feasible until the adoption of the Trainguard MT CBTC signalling system, as the legacy signalling systems used on the line had little capacity to interface smoothly with the APGs. In addition, the Metro-Cammell EMUs lacked an motoring and braking system advanced enough to achieve high accuracy in platform stopping location, which is a prerequisite for APGs operations. As such, the actual installation of APGs could only take place after the new signalling system comes into operation and all Metro-Cammell EMUs are withdrawn from service. Advance works like platform structure strengthening commenced in 2013, yet the first pair of APGs was not installed until 7 May 2023, one week short of the cross-harbour extension's first anniversary. A second batch of installation works was expected to commence at Sha Tin, Tai Wai, Lok Ma Chau, and Sheung Shui later in 2023. Kowloon Tong, Fo Tan, and Tai Wo were the third batch. Mong Kok East, University, and Lo Wu were the last stations to undergo installation works. All stations were expected to have APGs by the end of 2025. The installation on all the stations finished earlier than expected on 4 June 2025, with Mong Kok East finishing the installation on Platform 1 by 23 May 2025.

As the APGs would block passengers' view of the wide platform gaps, the MTR installed 140 mechanical gap fillers at Mong Kok East, University, and Lo Wu stations to reduce passengers' safety risks.
