= Eel River =

Eel River may refer to:

Rivers

- Eel River (California), which flows into the Pacific Ocean near Eureka, United States
  - South Fork Eel River, which flows into the Eel near Weott, California
    - East Branch South Fork Eel River
- Eel River (Wabash River), in northern Indiana, United States
- Eel River (White River), in southern Indiana, United States
- Eel River (Massachusetts), which flows into Plymouth Harbor, United States

Other uses

- Eel River, Clay County, Indiana, United States, an unincorporated community
- Eel River Bar First Nation, a First Nation located in Northern New Brunswick, Canada
- Eel River Crossing, New Brunswick, Canada, a village in Restigouche County
- Eel River tribe, a sub-set of the Miami people of Indiana, United States
- Eel River Athapaskan peoples, a group of closely related tribal peoples in California, United States

== See also ==
- Eel (disambiguation)
- Eel River Township (disambiguation)
