= Eeles =

Eeles (or Eells) is a surname and a given name. It may refer to:

- Francis Carolus Eeles (1876–1954), English liturgical scholar and church historian
- James Eells (1926–2007), American mathematician
- Nick Eeles (born 1961), British Army major general
- Payton Eeles (born 1999), American baseball player
- Rosalind Eeles, British geneticist and clinician
- Zoë Eeles (born 1975), Scottish actress
- Eeles Landström (born 1932), Finnish retired pole vaulter, politician and business executive
