= Urban Council Centenary Garden =

Public park in Hong Kong

Coordinates: 22.299643°N 114.17773°E

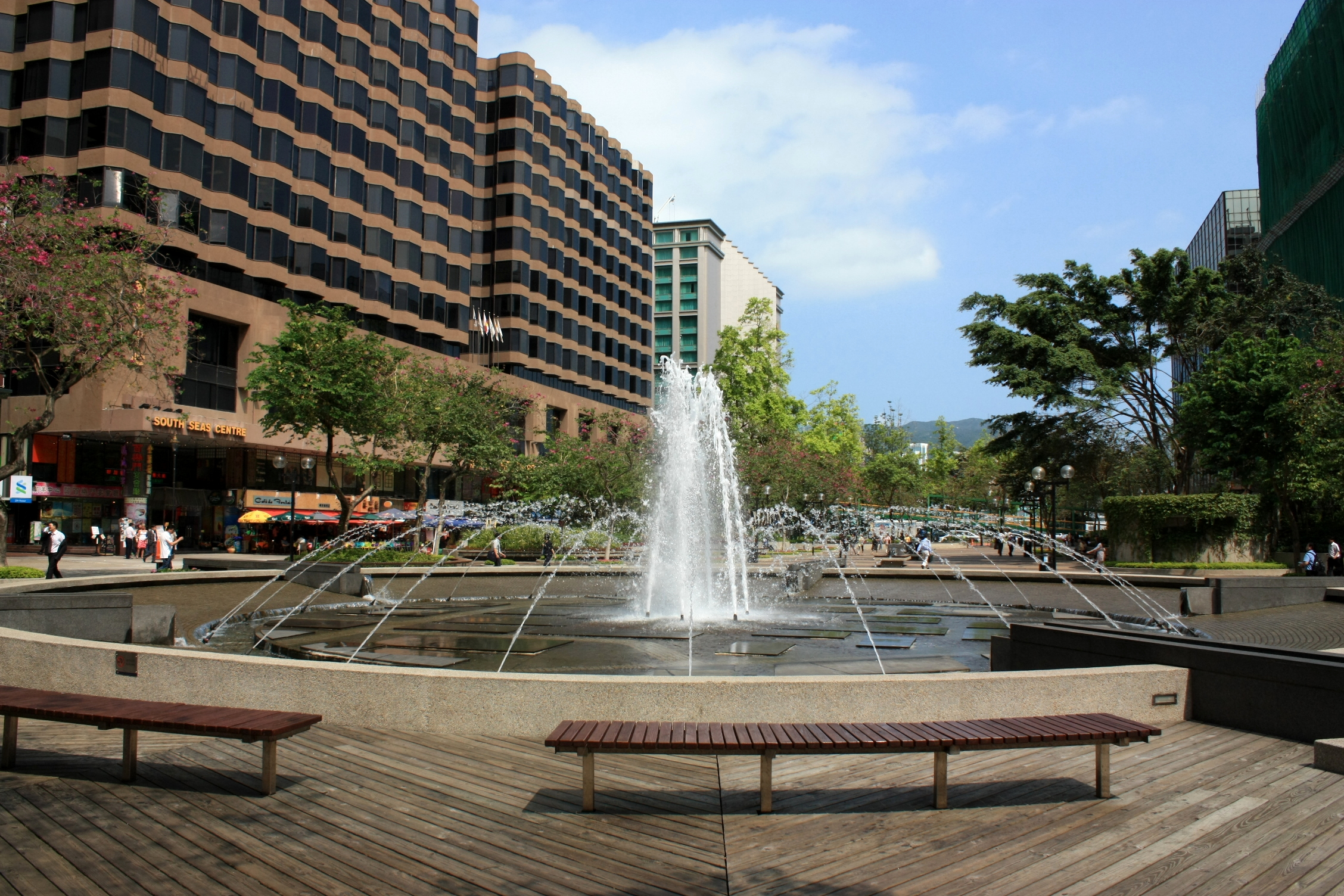
South Seas Centre and fountain in the eastern section of the Garden.

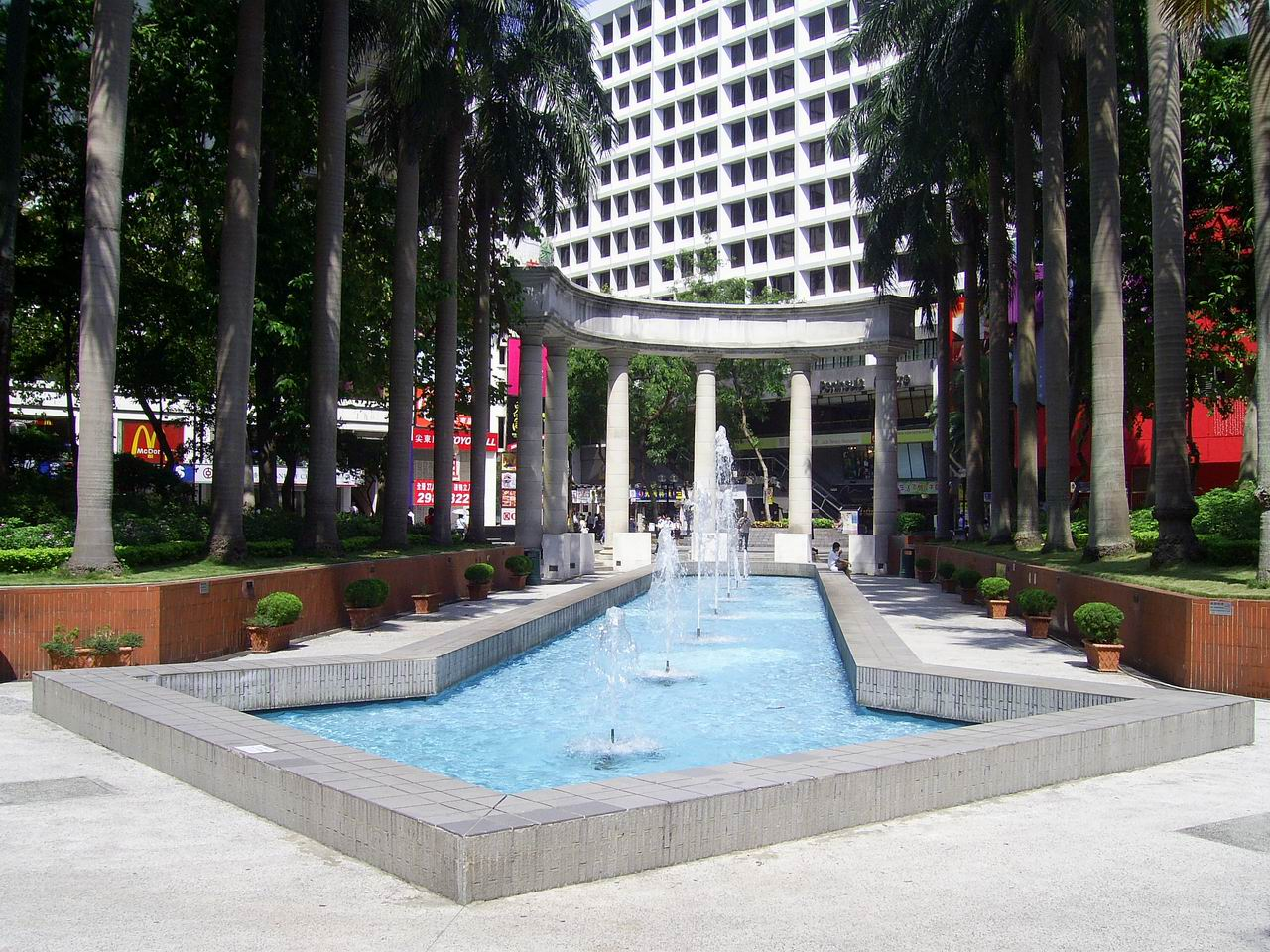
Fountain and columns from the former Kowloon station, in the western section of the Garden.

The Urban Council Centenary Garden (Chinese: 市政局百周年紀念公園) is a public park in Tsim Sha Tsui East, Kowloon, Hong Kong. It commemorates the centennial anniversary of the establishment of the Urban Council. The first phase of the park opened on 15 December 1983 with a ceremony officiated by Kim Cham, chairman of the Urban Council Centenary.

The park is divided into two sites, one in the west near Chatham Road South and another in the east near Mody Road, connected by a pavement corridor between Hilton Towers and Peninsula Centre.

The eastern half features more open space, allowing organisations to hold larger activities like fun fairs. A fountain occupies its north end. The western half features a six-pillar colonnade from the former Kowloon station at the end of a second fountain.

== Gallery ==
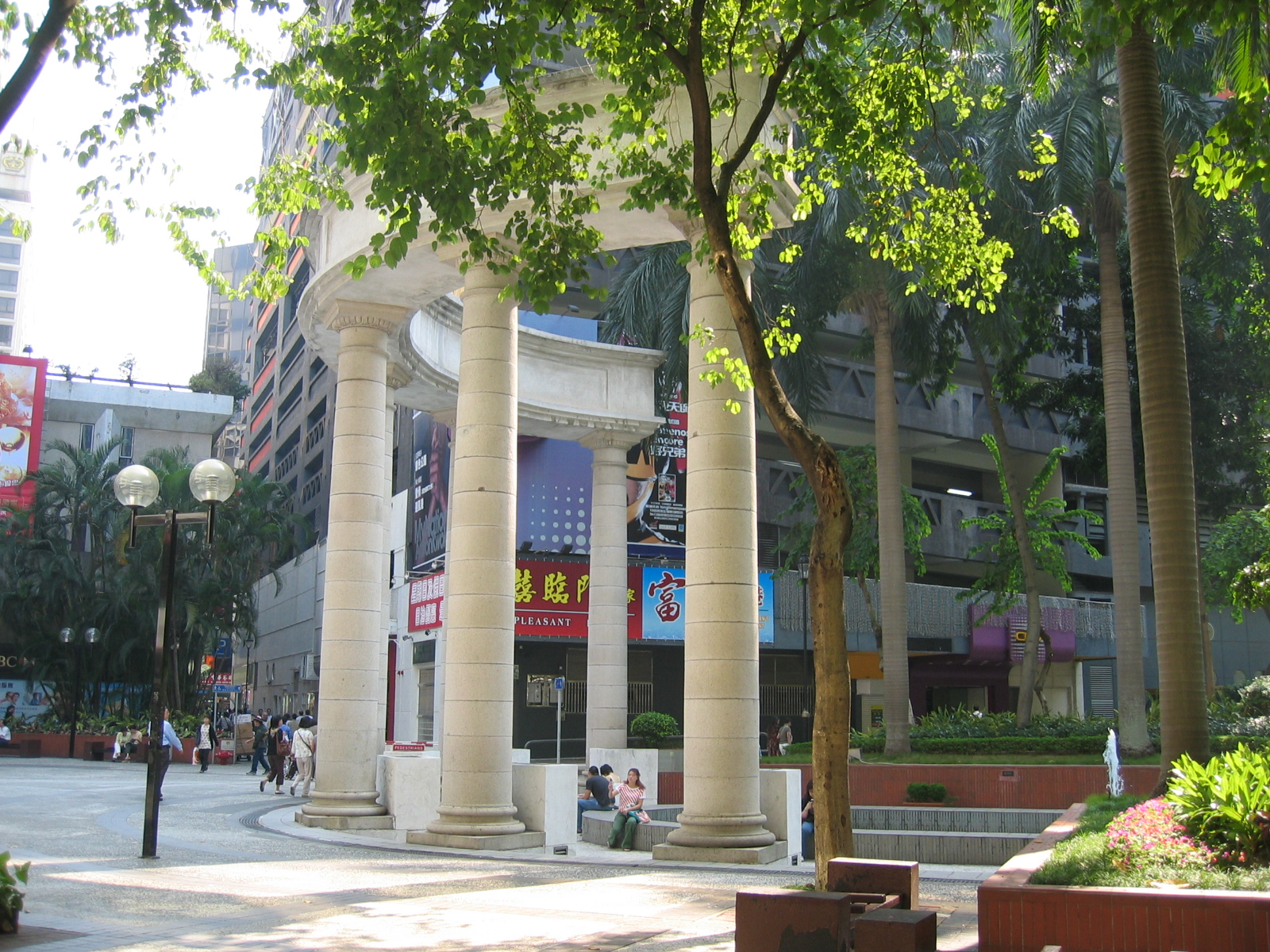
Six pillars from the former Kowloon station

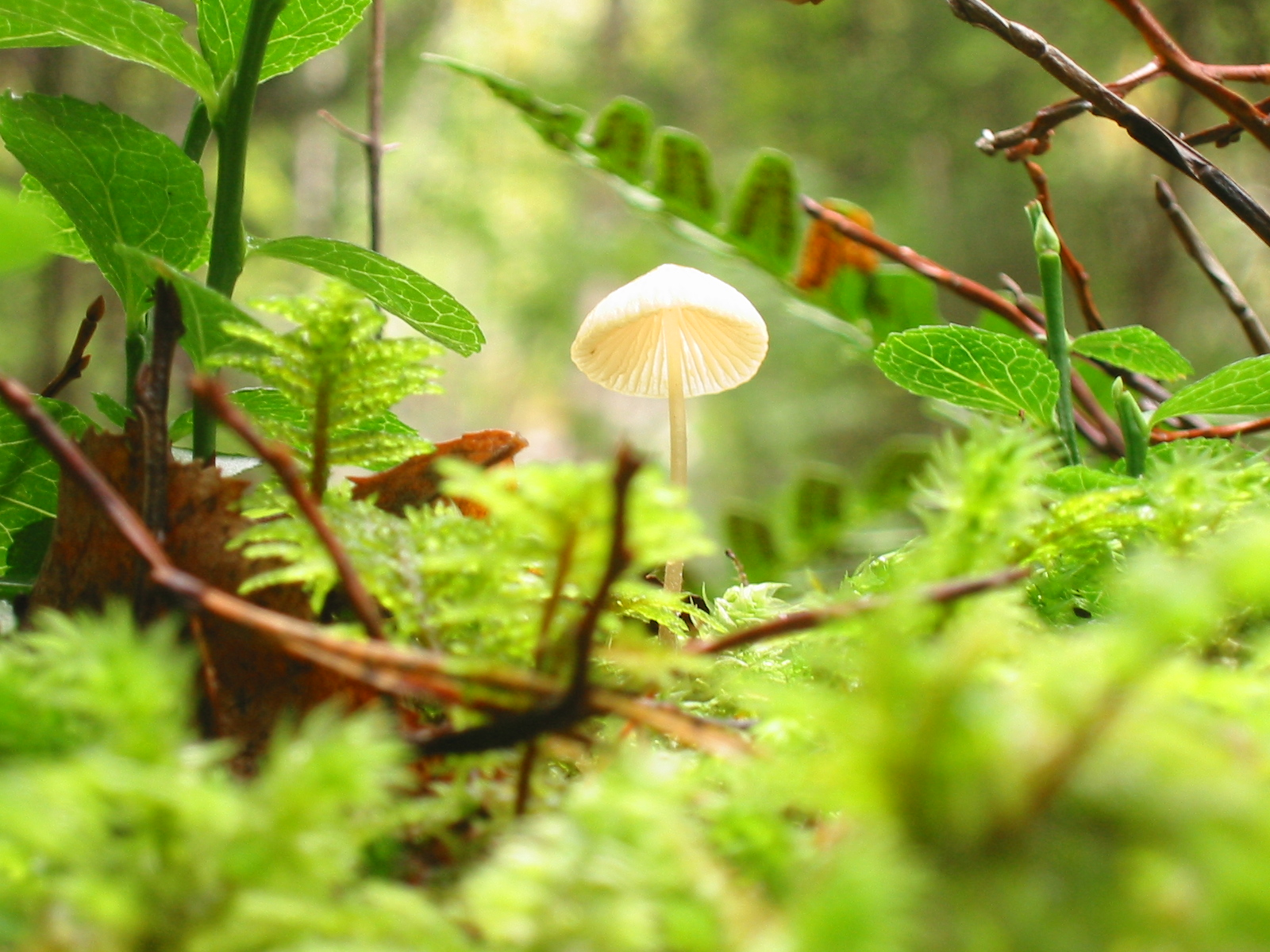
Trees in the Garden
