= Kowloon railway station (KCR) =

Former train station in Hong Kong

Kowloon 九龍
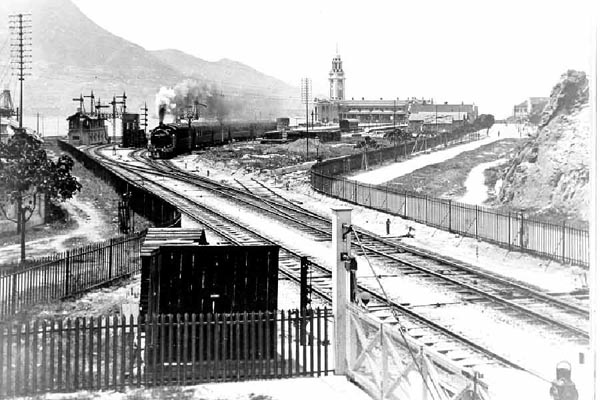
- A train departing from Kowloon station, picture taken in 1916.

General information
- Location: Tsim Sha Tsui, Hong Kong
- Coordinates: 22°17′38″N 114°10′13″E
- System: KCR station
- Owner: Kowloon-Canton Railway Corporation
- Operator: Kowloon-Canton Railway Corporation
- Line: Kowloon–Canton Railway (British Section)
- Connections: Bus, public light bus

Construction
- Structure type: At-grade

History
- Opened: 28 March 1916; 110 years ago
- Closed: 29 November 1975; 50 years ago

Former services
| Preceding station | KCR | Following station |
|---|---|---|
| Terminus | KCR British section | Hung Hom towards Lo Wu |
Location
- Location within MTR

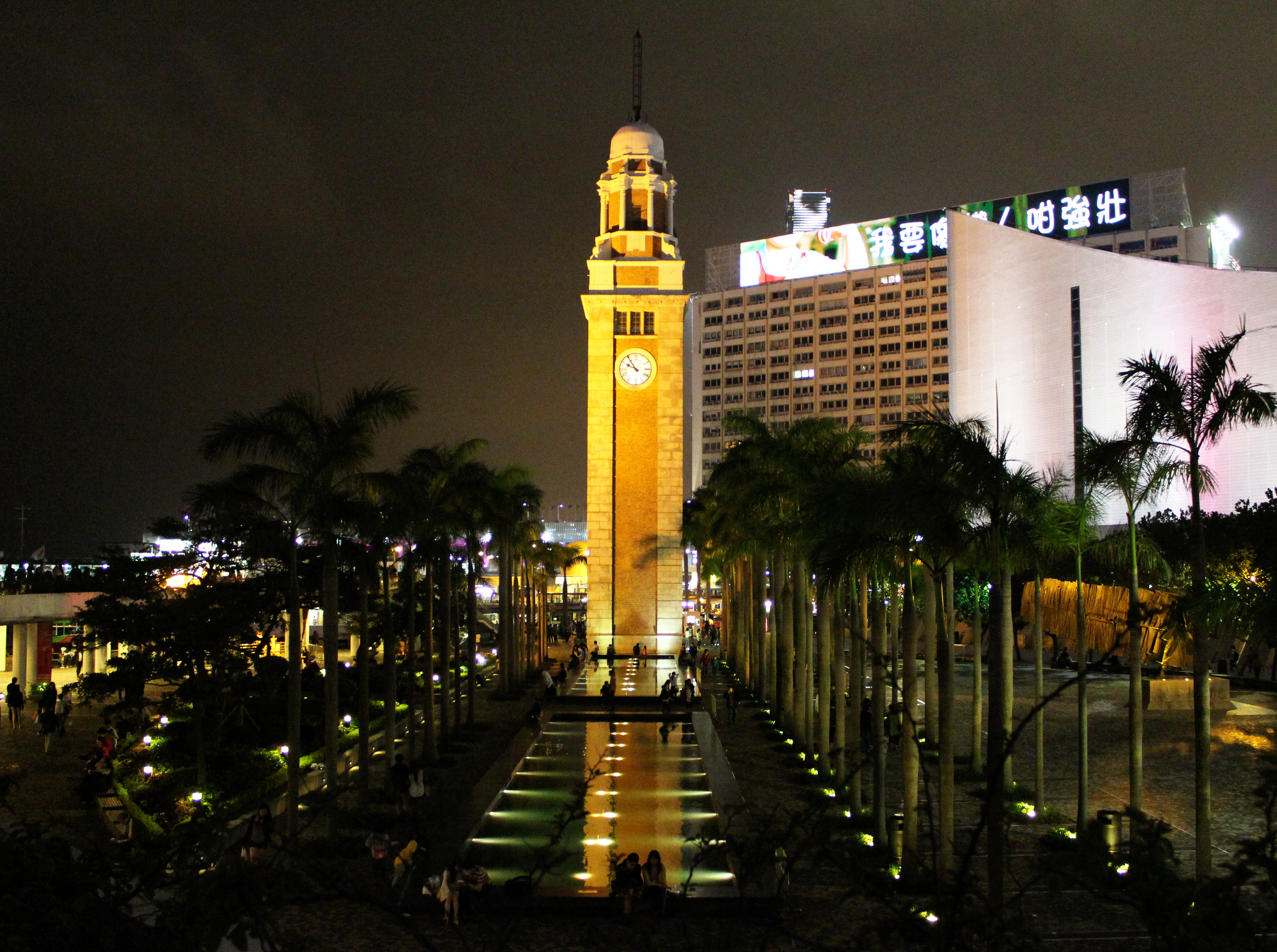
The Clock Tower in Tsim Sha Tsui is a famous landmark of Kowloon.

Kowloon station (Chinese: 九龍車站), colloquially Old Tsim Sha Tsui Terminal, located in Tsim Sha Tsui on the present site of the Hong Kong Cultural Centre, was the former southern terminus of the Kowloon–Canton Railway (KCR).

== History ==
The first Kowloon station was a temporary structure built near the (now demolished) Post Office on Salisbury Road in 1909 and served until the permanent station was completed. Regular service between Canton and Kowloon began on 1 October 1910.

The new station was designed by Arthur Benison Hubback and built on reclaimed land overlooking the harbour. Work on the foundations started in May 1913, and the construction of the station began on 1 March 1914. It was completed on 1 March 1916, and the station was officially opened on 28 March 1916.

The building consisted of a two-storey L-shaped terminal building with a clock tower. It was designed in a Edwardian Classical Revival style, and built had a steel frame with red brick cladding as well as white granite columns, architraves and pediments. On the north end of the station was a covered walkway which led to two covered elevated platforms. A freight station was located a mile north of the station.

== Relocation ==
Owing to a lack of space for expansion, the southern terminus of the railway was moved from Tsim Sha Tsui to a new station named Hung Hom on the new reclaimed land from Hung Hom Bay in 1974. The Hong Kong Cultural Centre was constructed on the site.

After its relocation to Hung Hom (also replacing the old Hung Hom station) in 1974, the new southern terminus of the KCR, the railway which was renamed KCR East Rail in the late 1990s.

== Preservation campaign ==
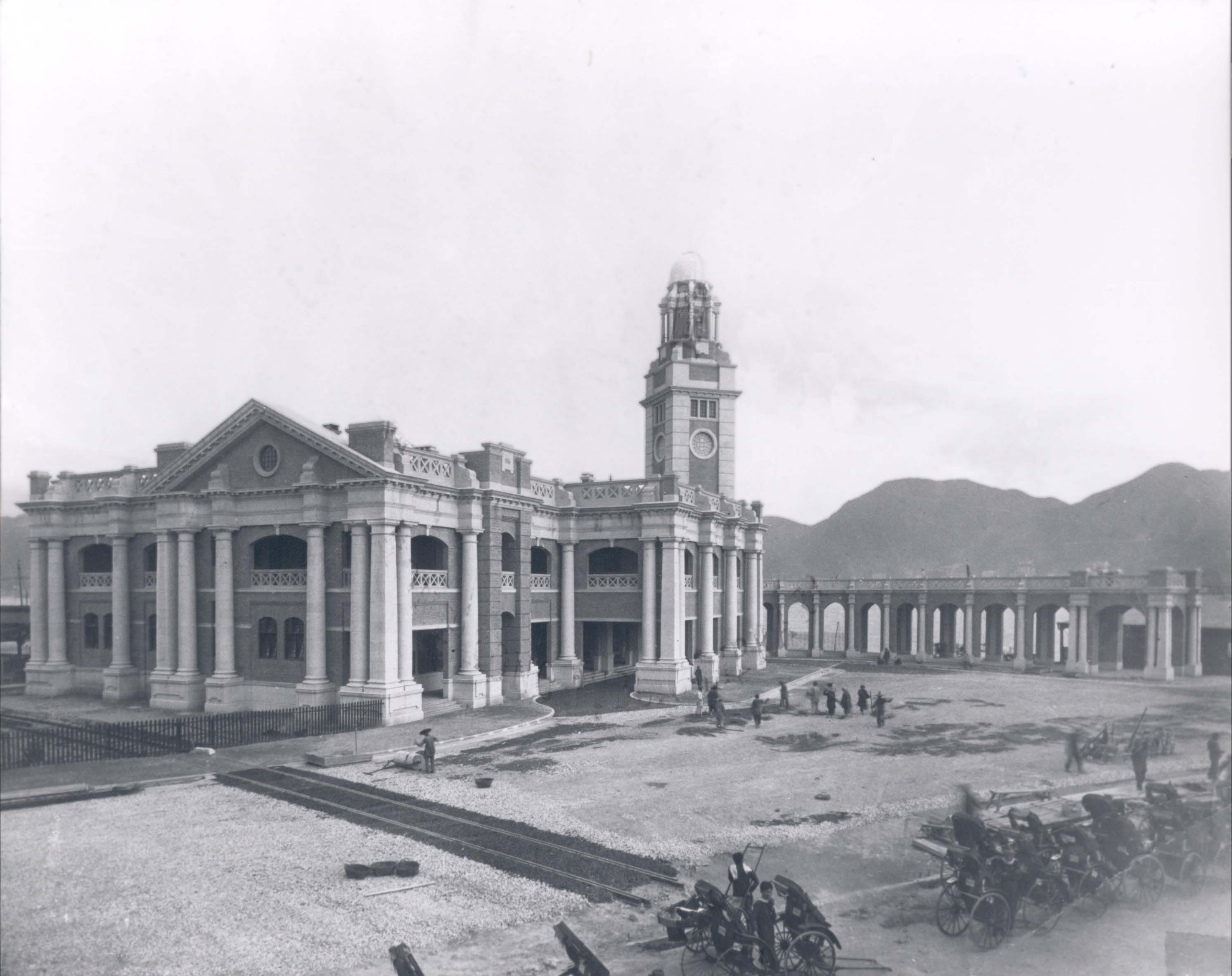
Kowloon station circa 1914

A campaign was mounted to preserve the 60-year-old red brick terminus. The Kowloon Residents' Association wrote to the Colonial Secretary in 1970; the Tsim Sha Tsui Neighbourhood and Welfare Association also wrote to the Colonial Secretary in 1975, and again in May 1977.

A petition was mounted by the Heritage Society, and sent to the then Governor, Murray MacLehose on 29 July 1977. The Government rejected the petition, and its request for an independent inquiry into the draft area development plan. It argued that a new cultural complex would assume the role enjoyed by the building, and that the plans for a new cultural complex to be erected on the site were too far advanced to be altered. The Heritage society charged that the Government was engaged in dirty tricks, and was misleading the public.

The Heritage Society escalated lobbying effort, and petitioned Queen Elizabeth II with a file containing some 15,000 signatures in February 1978, hoping for royal intervention. Within 48 hours of the Royal decision, the demolition crew had already moved in.

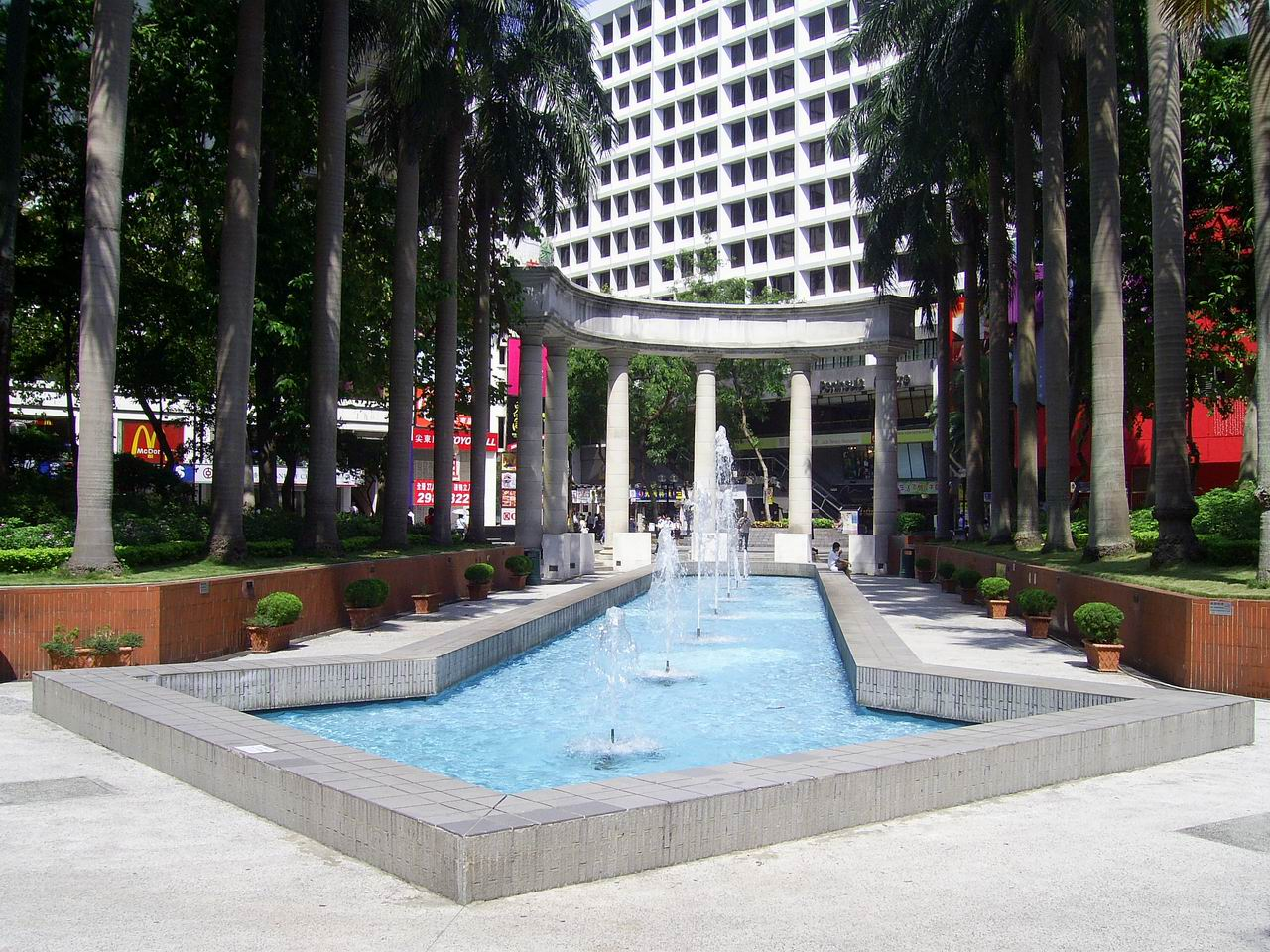
Six pillars of the former station building, now in the Urban Council Centenary Garden.

== Clock Tower ==
The Clock Tower is the only part of the old station in Tsim Sha Tsui remaining at its own site. Six pillars of the station building were moved to the Urban Council Centenary Garden in Tsim Sha Tsui East. After decades at other locations, including the East Rail depot at Ho Tung Lau, the clock tower's bell was returned to its original home in September 2010.

== See also ==
- Tsim Sha Tsui station
- Hung Hom station
- East Tsim Sha Tsui station
- Hong Kong West Kowloon railway station
