= Rosalind Eeles =

British geneticist and cancer researcher

- Education: University of Cambridge; St Thomas' Hospital Medical School; University of London
- Scientific career
- Fields: Oncogenetics, Cancer genetics
- Workplaces: Institute of Cancer Research; The Royal Marsden NHS Foundation Trust
- Thesis: Germline and Somatic Mutations in the TP53 Gene in Breast and Other Cancers (2000)

Rosalind Anne Eeles is a professor of Oncogenetics at the Institute of Cancer Research and clinician at the Royal Marsden NHS Foundation Trust. She is a leader in the field of genetic susceptibility to prostate cancer, and is known for the discovery of 14 genetic variants involved in prostate cancer predisposition. According to ResearchGate, Eeles has published more than 500 articles in peer-reviewed journals, with over 34,000 citations and an h-index of 92. Eeles was elected a Fellow of the Academy of Medical Science in 2012. She was awarded a National Institute for Health Research Senior Investigator Emeritus in 2014.

== Education ==
Eeles completed her medical training at the University of Cambridge and St Thomas' Hospital Medical School, and trained in Clinical Oncology at The Royal Marsden NHS Foundation Trust. She completed a PhD in cancer genetics at the Institute of Cancer Research, finishing her thesis in 2000.

== Research ==
Eeles' research is focussed on the genetic causes of prostate cancer and identifying patients with increased risk of developing the disease. She leads a UK clinical trial investigating the impact of regular screening for patients with increased risk of prostate cancer due to BRCA mutations. Eeles also established PRACTICAL, an international consortium that allows researchers to share genetic data from prostate cancer patients. Her research group are part of the International Cancer Genome Consortium (ICGC).

== Selected works ==
- Magali Olivier; Rosalind Eeles; Monica Hollstein; Mohammed A Khan; Curtis C Harris; Pierre Hainaut (1 June 2002). "The IARC TP53 database: new online mutation analysis and recommendations to users". Human Mutation. 19 (6): 607–614. doi:10.1002/humu.10081. ISSN 1059-7794. PMID 12007217. Wikidata Q43714274.
- Rosalind A Eeles; Zsofia Kote-Jarai; Graham G Giles; et al. (March 2008). "Multiple newly identified loci associated with prostate cancer susceptibility". Nature Genetics. 40 (3): 316–21. doi:10.1038/ng.90. ISSN 1061-4036. PMID 18264097. Wikidata Q28268180.
- Rosalind A Eeles; Zsofia Kote-Jarai; Ali Amin Al Olama; et al. (20 September 2009). "Identification of seven new prostate cancer susceptibility loci through a genome-wide association study". Nature Genetics. 41 (10): 1116–1121. doi:10.1038/ng.450. ISSN 1061-4036. PMC 2846760. PMID 19767753. Wikidata Q29417022.
- Mahbubl Ahmed; Chee Goh; Edward Saunders; Clara Cieza-Borrella; PRACTICAL consortium; Zsofia Kote-Jarai; Fredrick R Schumacher; Rosalind Eeles (27 November 2019). "Germline genetic variation in prostate susceptibility does not predict outcomes in the chemoprevention trials PCPT and SELECT". Prostate Cancer and Prostatic Diseases. doi:10.1038/s41391-019-0181-y. ISSN 1365-7852. PMID 31776447. Wikidata Q91496974.
- Elizabeth K. Bancroft; Kelly Kohut; Rosalind Eeles (3 February 2020). "The New Genomics Era: Integration of genomics into mainstream oncology and implications for psycho-oncological care". Psycho-Oncology. 29 (3): 453–460. doi:10.1002/pon.5331. ISSN 1057-9249. PMID 32017261. Wikidata Q89525325.
