= Eels Lake =

Lake in Ontario, Canada

- Location within Ontario
- Location: Ontario
- Coordinates: 44.888°N 78.127°W
- Basin countries: Canada

Eels Lake is a lake located between the Kawartha lakes and Haliburton Highlands region of Ontario, Canada. The lake is about 974.8 hectares. It is approximately 170 Km Northeast of Toronto.

== History ==
Eel Cow, an Ojibwe chieftain, for which the lake is named, claimed this area and surrounding land as his family's hunting and fishing territory in the early 1800s.

== Fishing ==
The many islands and bays found in the lake make for ideal smallmouth bass, largemouth bass and Rock bass habitat. The lake also has natural population of lake trout, walleye, and yellow perch. In order to help preserve the natural lake trout population of Eels Lake, slot size and winter ice fishing restrictions are in place.

== Limnology ==
Eels Lake has high water clarity and good water quality, with Secchi depths usually ranging from 4 to 6 meters. Chlorophyll concentrations are generally low, indicating low algal biomass and a low risk of harmful algal blooms. Calcium concentrations are consistent at 7–8 mg Ca/L, lower than the regional average but not of immediate concern. Dissolved oxygen levels have been variable and the source of this variability is unknown and could be studied further. Temperature measurements in Eels Lake show a range from about 21 °C at the surface to 4 °C at the lake’s bottom. Dissolved oxygen is high in surface waters and very low in the deepest waters. Total phosphorus concentrations are generally lower than those seen in other Kawartha region lakes.

== See also ==
- List of lakes in Ontario
