= Ho Tung Lau =

Former area in Hong Kong

Coordinates: 22.39560°N 114.19917°E

- 何東樓
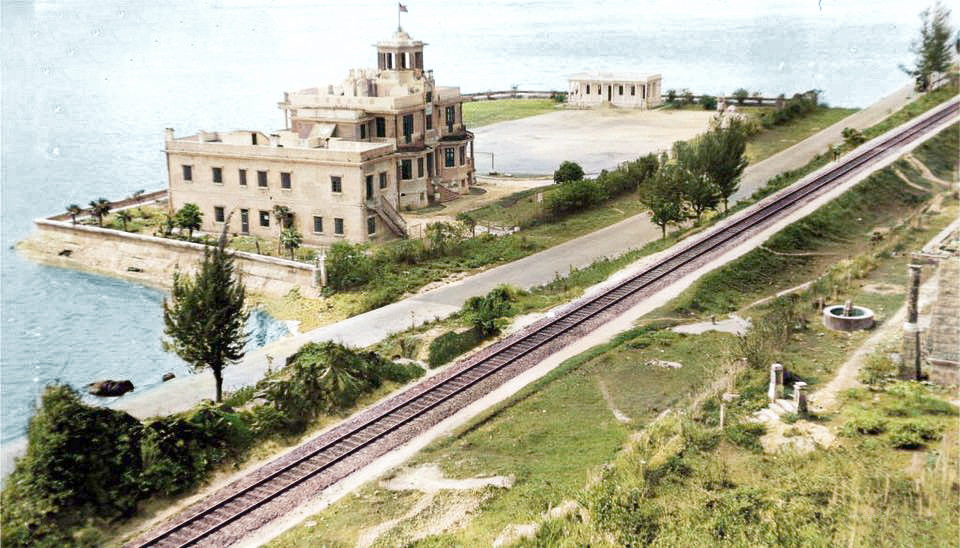
- Historical photograph of Ho Tung Lau in 1923, with KCR railway at the foreground.
- Interactive map of the Ho Tung Lau area
- Former names: Wah Kiu College, Arcullis Camp, St. Andrew College
- Alternative names: Windermere (海天漁廬), Eight Pointed Lau (八角樓)

General information
- Status: Demolished
- Type: Private Mansion
- Location: Fo Tan, New Territories, Hong Kong
- Named for: Robert Hotung
- Completed: August 1923; 102 years ago
- Demolished: Late 1970s
- Owner: Ho Sai Wing

Ho Tung Lau (Chinese: 何東樓), is a former area encompassing roughly current-day The Palazzo to the northeast of Lok Lo Ha in Sha Tin, near the MTR and on the former shore of Sha Tin Hoi, in the New Territories, Hong Kong.

The name of Ho Tung Lau is derived from the name of successful businessman Robert Hotung, with the character Lau (樓) meaning "a building" in Cantonese. Before the 1960s, the name referred to the estate of Robert Hotung's adopted son Ho Sai Wing, who bought a piece of reclaimed land near the Sha Tin Hoi and built a mansion called Windermere (referencing Lake Windermere in the United Kingdom).

Today, Ho Tung Lau is more likely to be associated with the area near the Ho Tung Lau Maintenance Centre. The Fo Tan MTR station is also next to the maintenance centre. Three private housing estates, Royal Ascot, The Palazzo, and Jubilee Garden have been developed in the old area of Ho Tung Lau.

== History ==
=== Origins ===
In 1923, Robert Hotung's adopted son Ho Sai Wing brought a plot of reclaimed land on the shore of Sha Tin Hoi next to the former KCR railway, and built a holiday mansion on it. Referencing Lake Windermere in the United Kingdom, the mansion was named Windermere (Chinese: 海天漁廬). The mansion was also known as Ho Tung Lau (Chinese: 何東樓) and Eight Pointed Lau (Chinese: 八角樓) by the locals. The mansion's main building was built in a Colonial style with an encompassing veranda. It is two storeys tall, with two Cant Bays on both sides of the main entrance terminating on the second floor, its roof serves as a balcony. A octagonal pavilion stands points out from the top of the structure (hence the name Eight Pointed Lau). In addition to the main building, staircases connect to an accompanying two-storey living quarter on the side of the mansion. There also stands a colonnaded single storey building detached from the main mansion on the other side of the plot. In front of the mansion is a sports ground.

During the Windermere mansion's early days, each summer Ho Sai Wing and his family would come to spend some holiday time. Robert Hotung's wife Margaret Mak (aka Maclean, 麥秀英; 1865–1944) visited the mansion three times, but Robert Hotung never actually visited the mansion. The mansion prompted people to settle around the area, later creating the settlement Ho Tung Lau Village.

=== As Wah Kiu College (1938-1941, 1945-1949) ===
In 1938, due to war and instability in Foshan, China, Fo Shan Wah Ying College (Chinese: 佛山華英中學) moved to Hong Kong and established their school by renting Ho Tung Lau (Windermere mansion and its grounds). They renamed to Wah Kiu College (Chinese: 華橋工商學院) and continued operations until 1941 when the Japanese Invasion of Hong Kong forced them to relocate to Liuzhou. After World War II ended in 1945, Wah Kiu College continued operations in Ho Tung Lau. At its peak the school had over 2000 students. Eventually it became part of the United College of Hong Kong, predecessor of the Chinese University Of Hong Kong.

=== As Arcullis camp (1949-1962) ===
Following in 1949 when The People's Republic of China defeated Nationalist China, the British Royal Air Force established a permanent airstrip and airbase in Sha Tin Hoi named Sha Tin Airfield. The government forced Wah Kiu College to leave due to needing Ho Tung Lau to act as an army camp, and in the summer of 1949 ended the last academic year at Ho Tung Lau campus. Ho Tung Lau was renamed Arcullis Camp, and served as the accommodation for both members of the army and Royal Air Force (RAF). The grounds also served as a Royal Electrical and Mechanical Engineers workshop, a photographic darkroom, and admin office.

Ho Tung Lau (Windermere Mansion) being used as St. Andrew College campus. Circa 1977.

In 1955 a ferry service was commenced that connected Ma On Shan to Ho Tung Lau, it aimed to connect the villages in the two areas as well as make Ma On Shan more accessible for work and vacation.The service operated from 6am to 6:30pm at 30 minute intervals, with a fare of 50 cents. According to maps in 1970, the Ho Tung Lau ferry service's pier was not located at the original Windermere mansion, but rather northeast of Ho Tung Lau at the former officer's mess of Sha Tin Airfield. This led to the name "Ho Tung Lau" to be referred to the pier and its adjacent building northeast of Lok Lo Ha. At around the same time a bus service also commenced, serving the residents of Ho Tung Lau Village.

=== 1960s ===
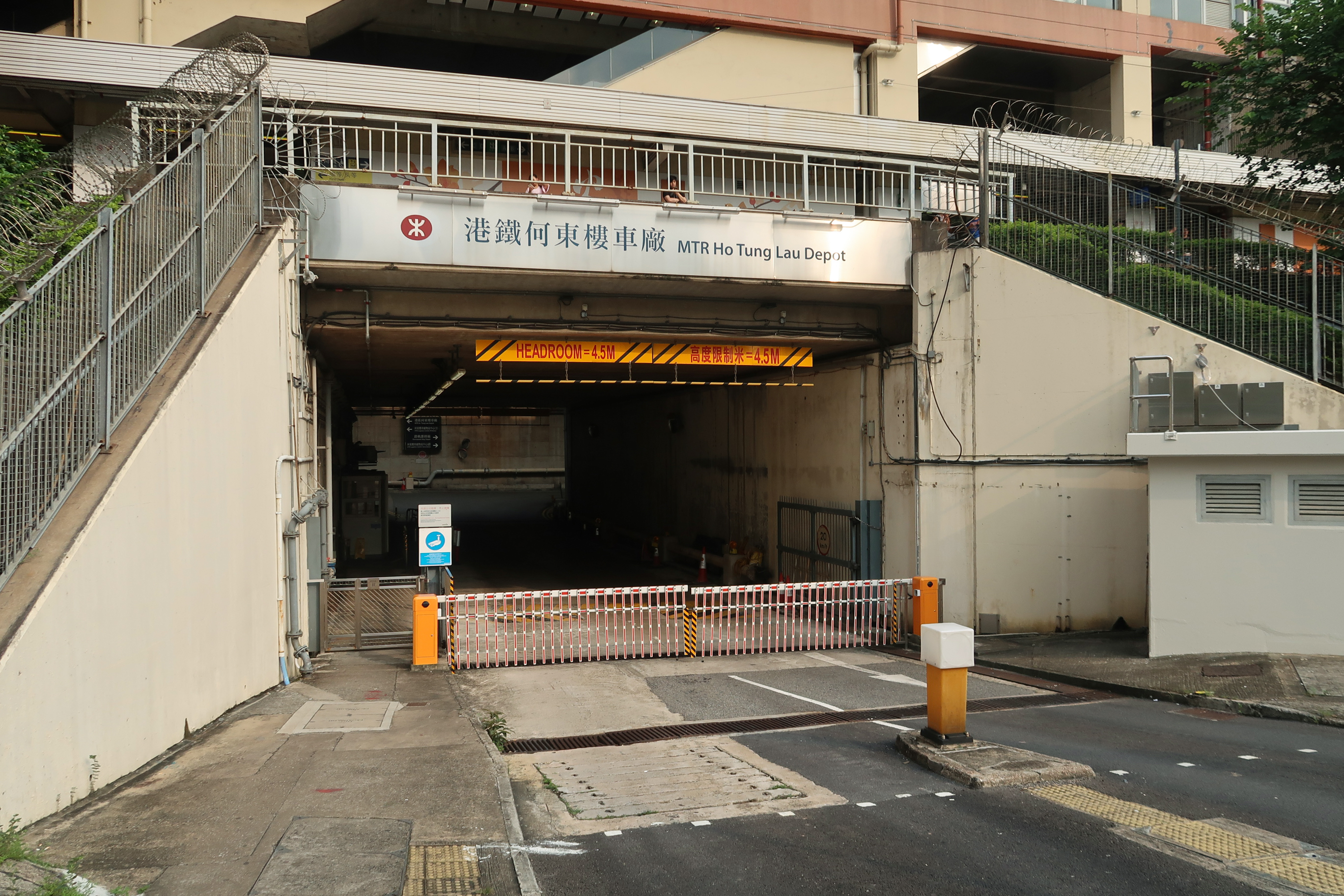
Ho Tung Lau Depot entrance in August 2018

In the 1st of September 1962, Typhoon Wanda severely damaged Sha Tin Airfield's facilities and planes. The RAF then ceased all operations in Sha Tin and abandoned Ho Tung Lau. In the late 1960s, St. Andrew College (Chinese: 聖安德烈書院) briefly used Ho Tung Lau (mansion) as their campus, it is not known when the mansion was eventually abandoned.

=== Reclamation and Demolition ===
After the government reclaimed the Ho Tung Lau area for development in 1966, KCR Staff Quarters and the Ho Tung Lau Maintenance Centre was built on reclaimed land next to Fo Tan in Sha Tin with its north end in Lok Lo Ha. After 1975, more land was reclaimed to facilitate the maintenance centre's southward expansion, and Ho Tung Lau (mansion) was eventually demolished in the late 1970s. (Note: Exact date of demolishing is unknown, but the 1977 movie The Amsterdam Kill - Robert Mitchum still features Ho Tung Lau (Windermere mansion))

== See also ==
- Ho Tung Gardens
- Sha Tin Airfield
