= Fo Tan =

Area in Hong Kong

Coordinates: 22.39694°N 114.19593°E

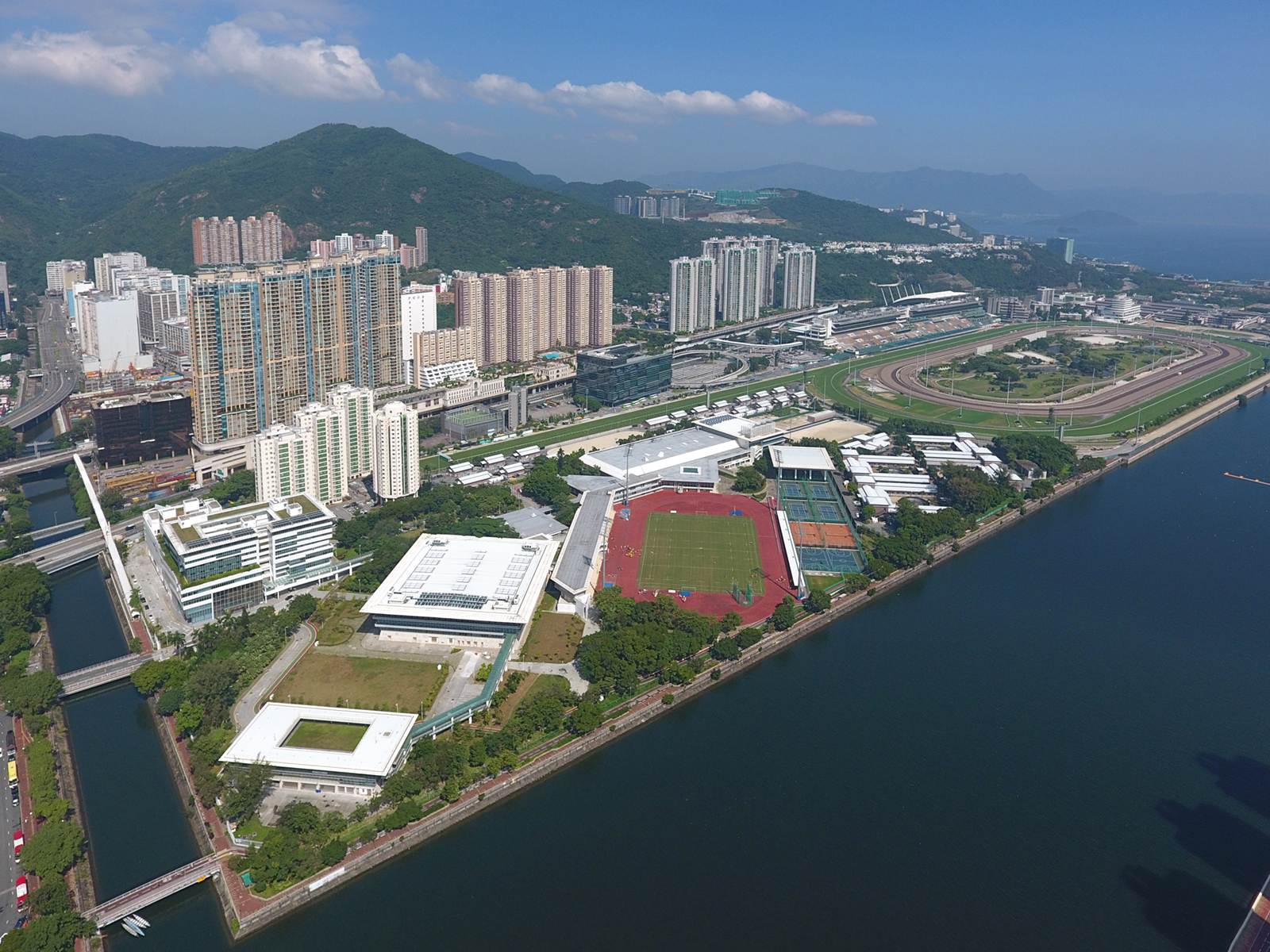
- View of Fo Tan
- Chinese: 火炭
- Literal meaning: fire charcoal
Transcriptions
Standard Mandarin
- Hanyu Pinyin: Huǒtàn
Yue: Cantonese
- Yale Romanization: Fó taan
- Jyutping: Fo2 taan3

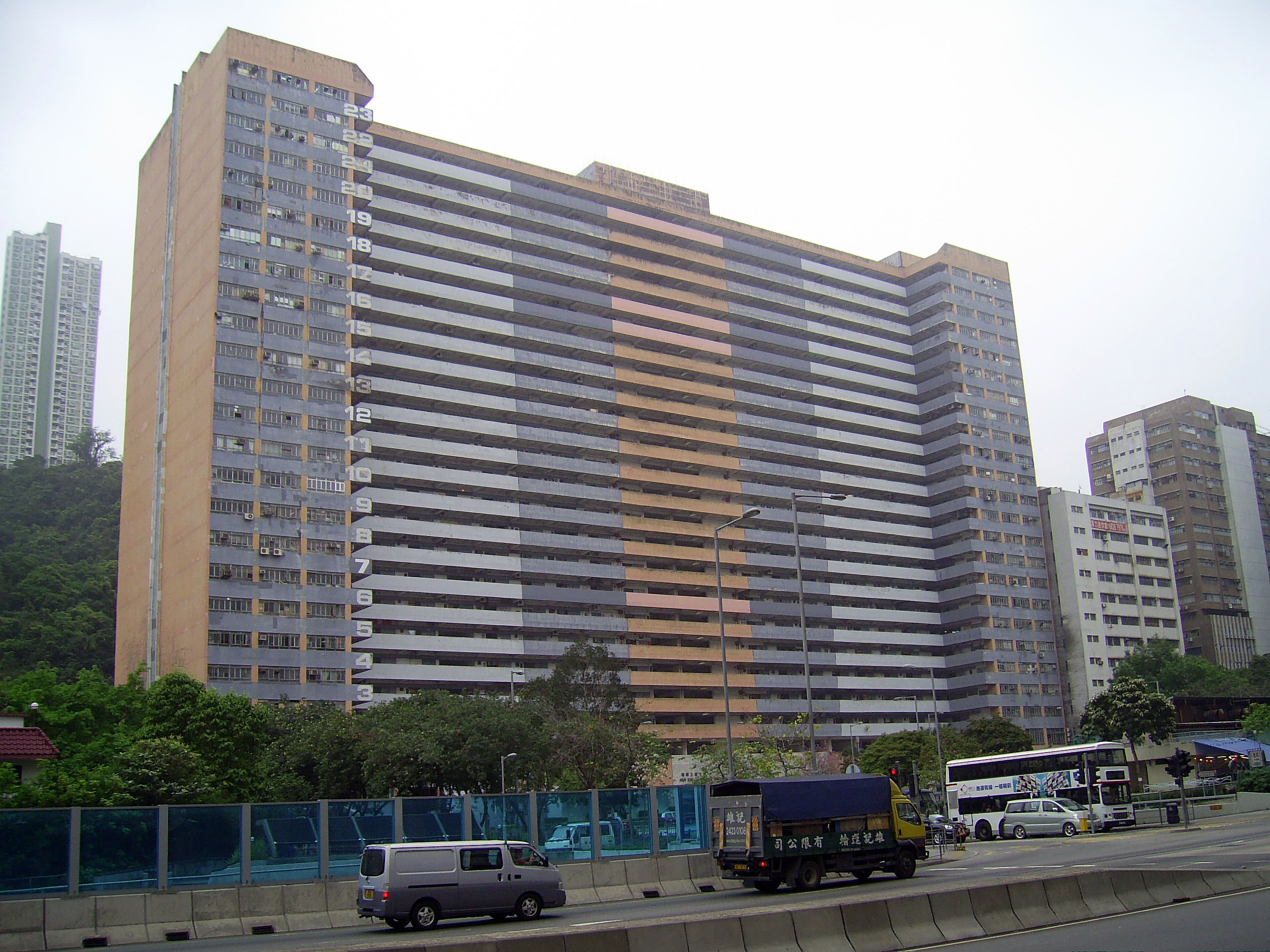
Sui Fai Factory Estate (穗輝工廠大廈) in Fo Tan, demolished in 2023

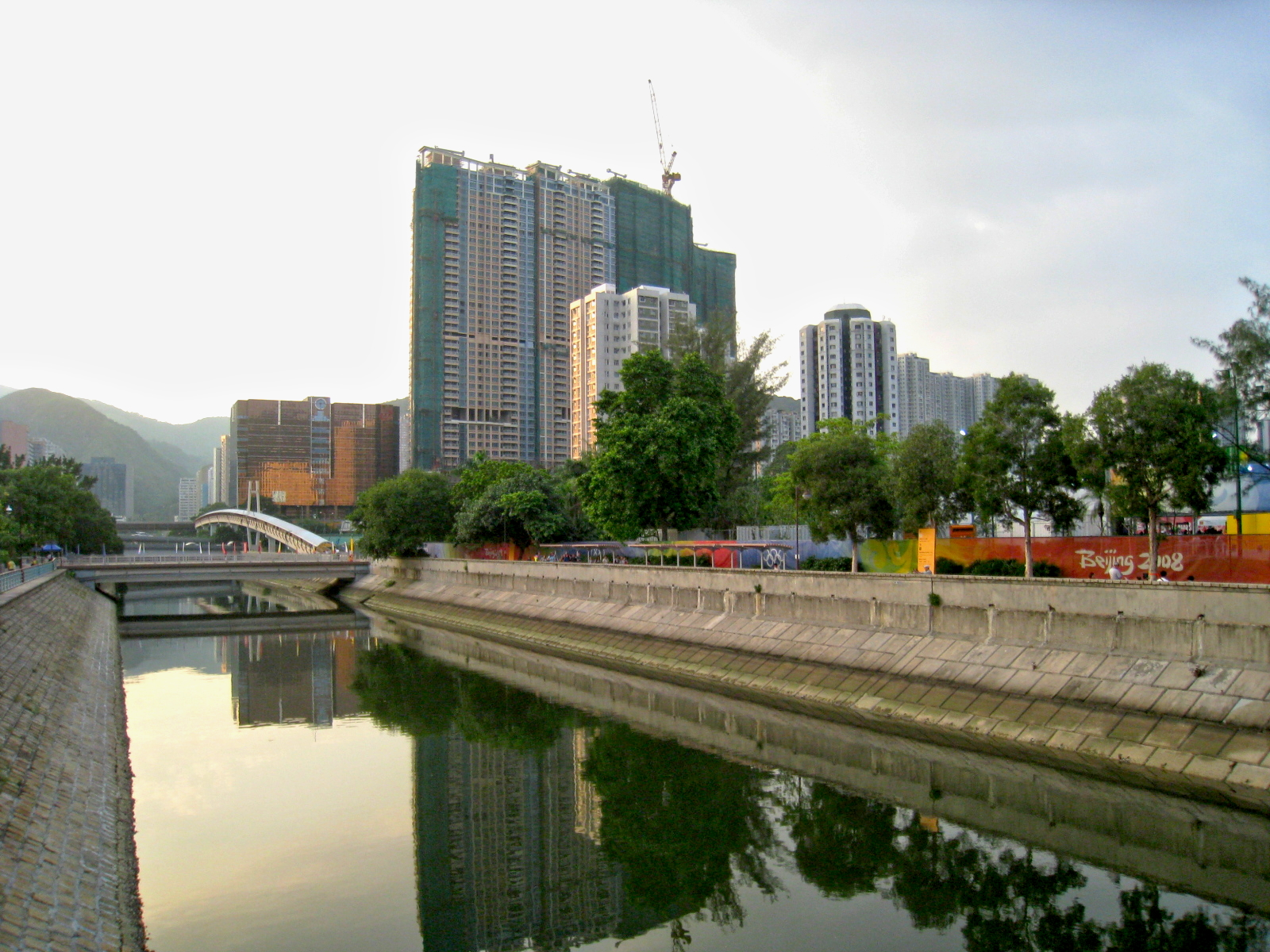
Fo Tan Nullah

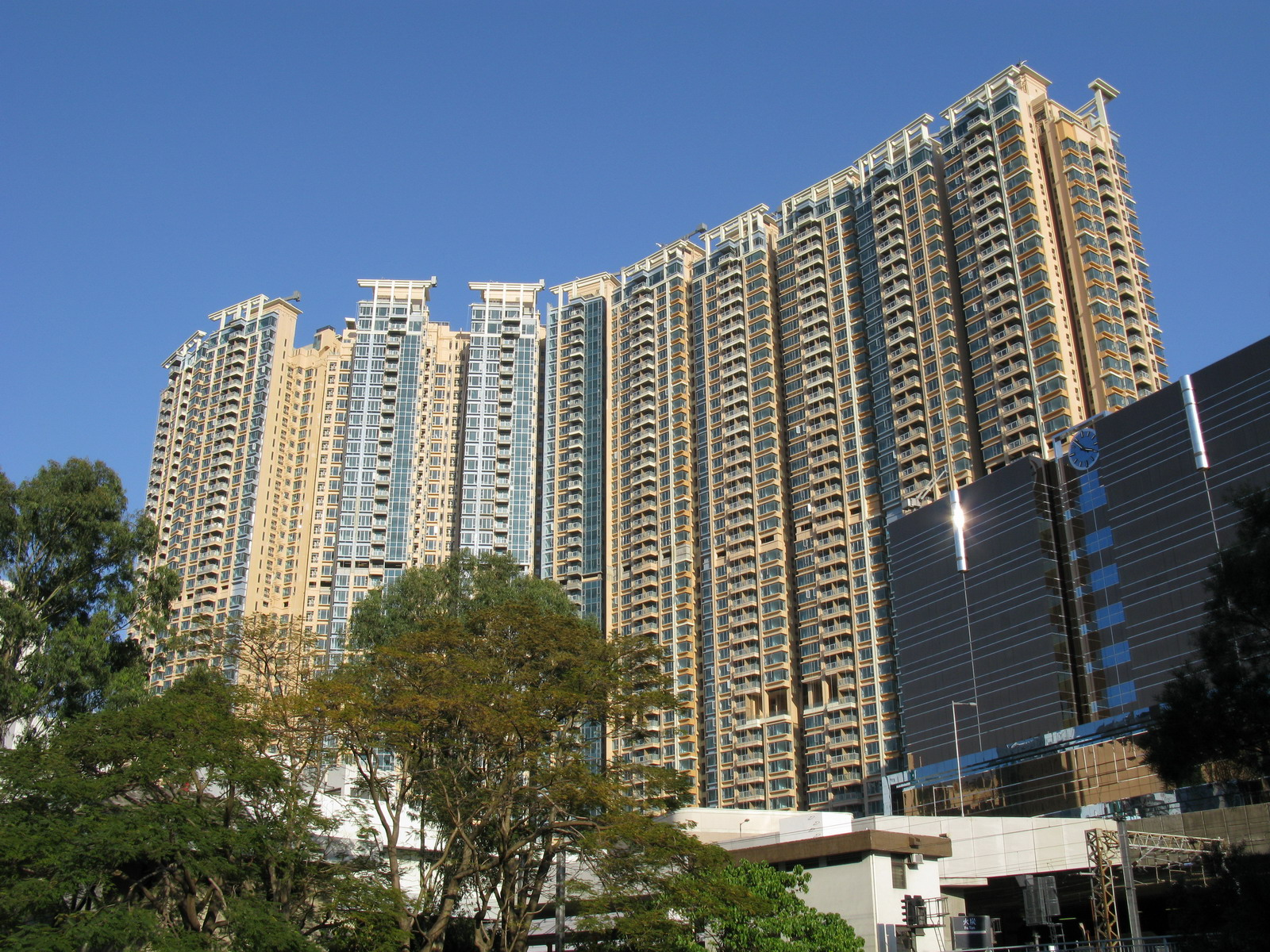
The Palazzo and Fo Tan Railway House, next to Fo Tan station

Fo Tan (Chinese: 火炭; Cantonese Yale: Fótaan) is an area of Sha Tin District, New Territories, Hong Kong. It was developed as a light industrial area, but this activity has declined markedly in recent years. There are residential areas to the east, alongside the MTR line, and in the foothills to the west.

== Etymology ==
Fo Tan is located around a river, the Fo Tan Nullah. Historically, a beach was revealed when the water receded. The area thus became known as "river beach" (Chinese: 河灘). In Hakka, this was pronounced "Fo Tan". It was later mistakenly called "Fire Beach" (Chinese: 火灘) due to similarities in pronunciation. This has further changed into "Fire Charcoal" (Chinese: 火炭) which is in current use, again due to similarities in pronunciation.

== Location ==
To the south is Sha Tin New Town, with the small community of Wo Che in between. To the north is Kau To and the Chinese University of Hong Kong (CUHK). Nearby to the east is Sha Tin Racecourse while across the Shing Mun River is City One Shatin.

== Artistic community ==
Since 2001, as most industrial businesses have closed and moved to mainland China, more than 70 units in the utilitarian industrial blocks have reopened as artists' studios, creating a vibrant local arts scene. Every January, a festival, Fotanian - Open Studio Programme, sees many of the studios open to the public. Guided walks lead visitors to these normally private working studios, which encompass a wide range of media and styles such as ceramic and floral design. Fo Tan was chosen for artist spaces because the ceilings of the buildings are high and because it is in the middle of the New Territories.

== Housing ==
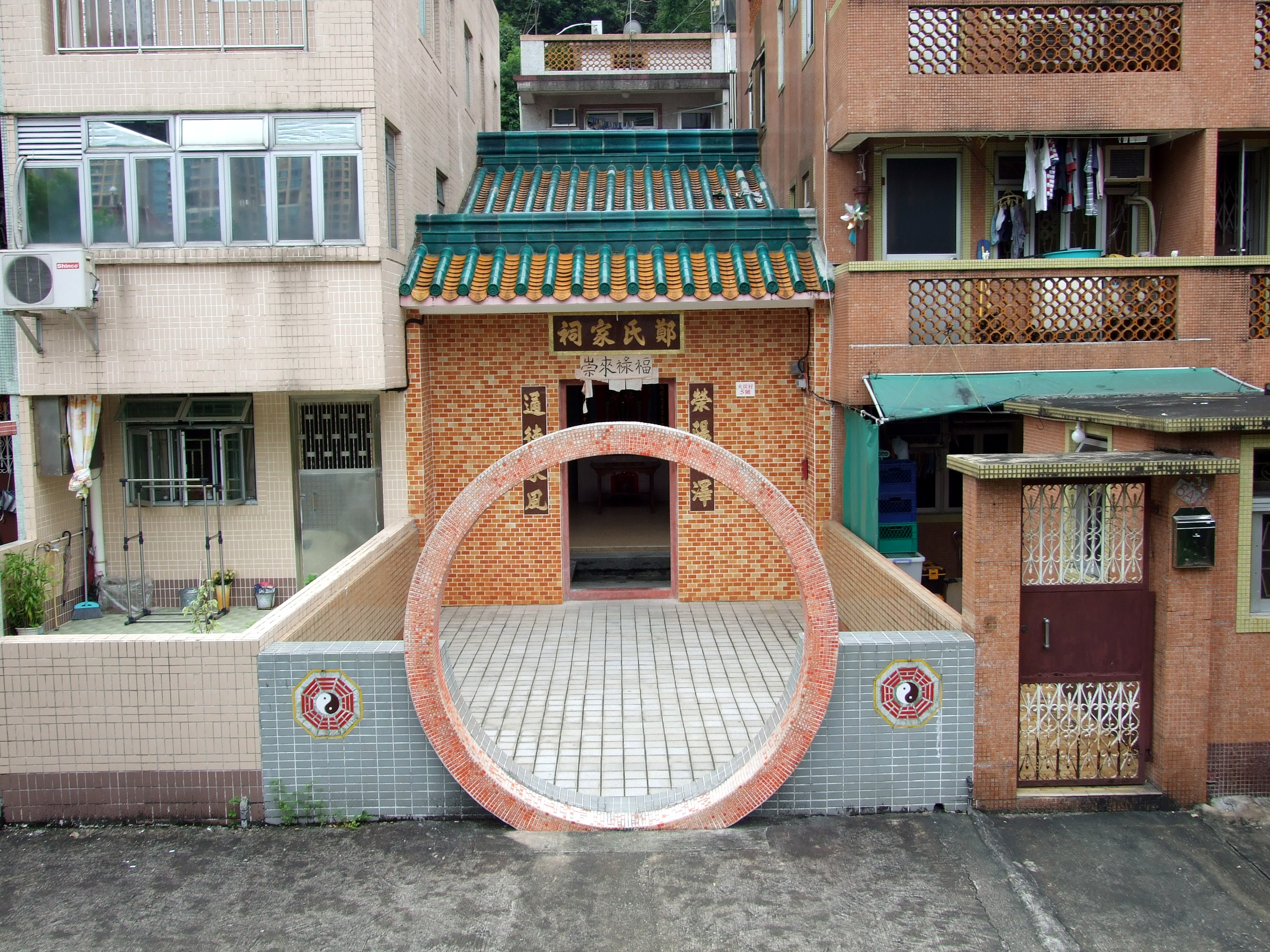
Cheng Ancestral Hall in Fo Tan Village

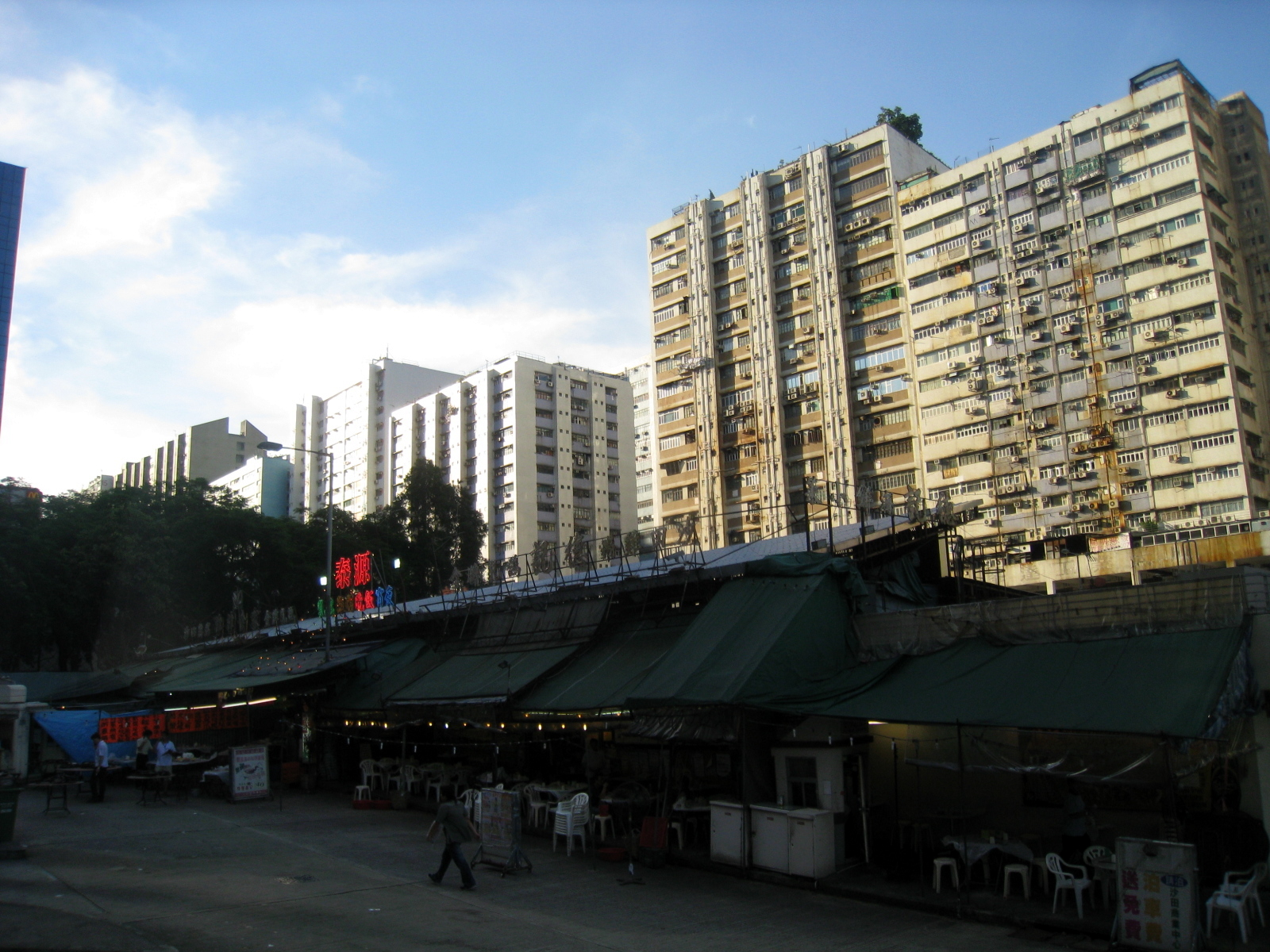
Dai pai dong and industrial buildings in Fo Tan

=== Public housing estates ===
- Chun Yeung Estate
- Sui Wo Court

=== Private housing estates ===
Private housing estates in Fo Tan include:

- Royal Ascot
- Jubilee Garden
- Scenery Garden
- Shatin 33
- The Grandville
- The Palazzo
- The Arles

=== Villages ===
There are originally 24 Hakka villages. Villages in Fo Tan include:

- Fo Tan Village
- Lok Lo Ha
- Pat Tsz Wo
- Wo Liu Hang

== Economy ==
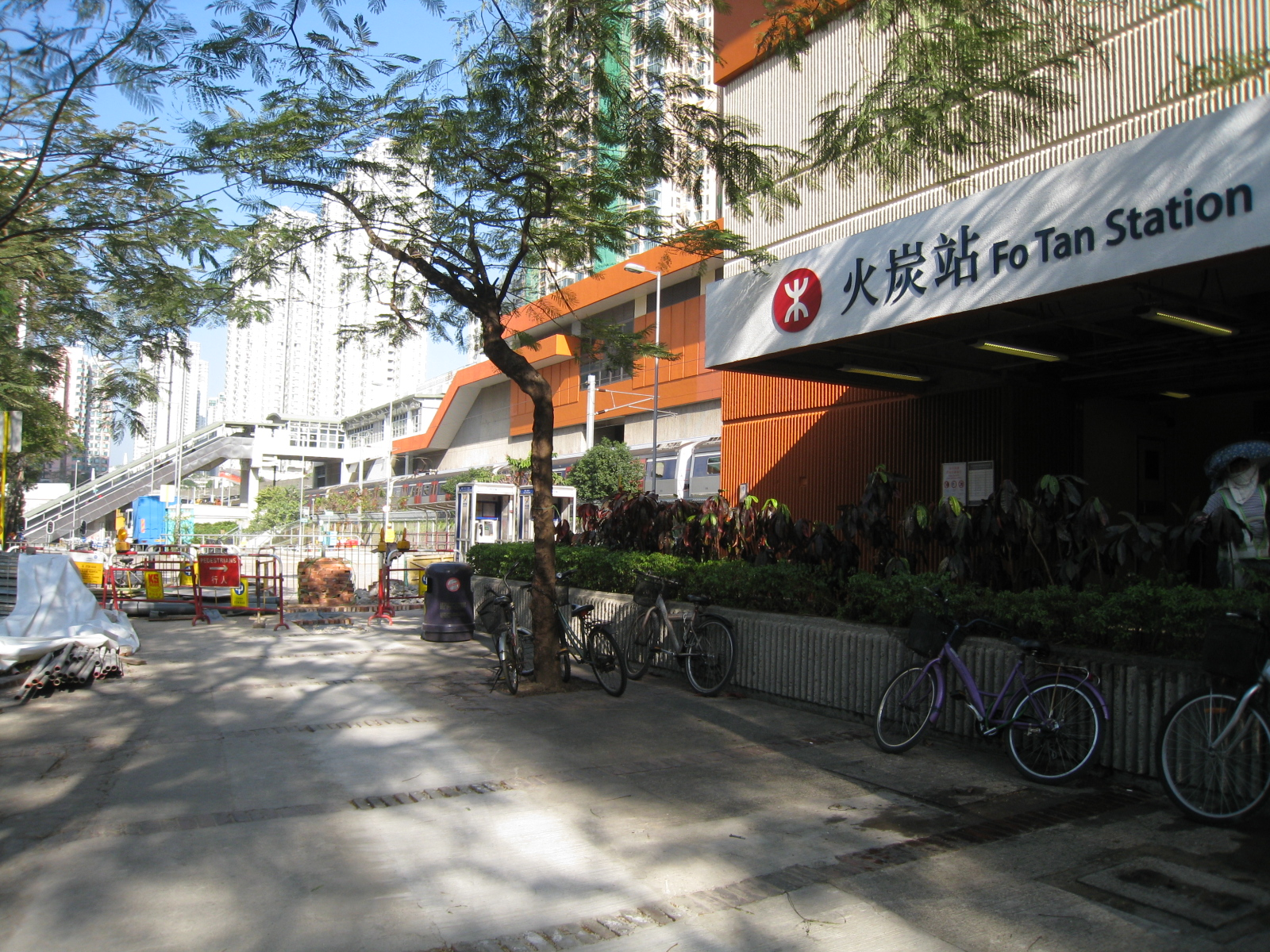
Entrance of Fo Tan Station

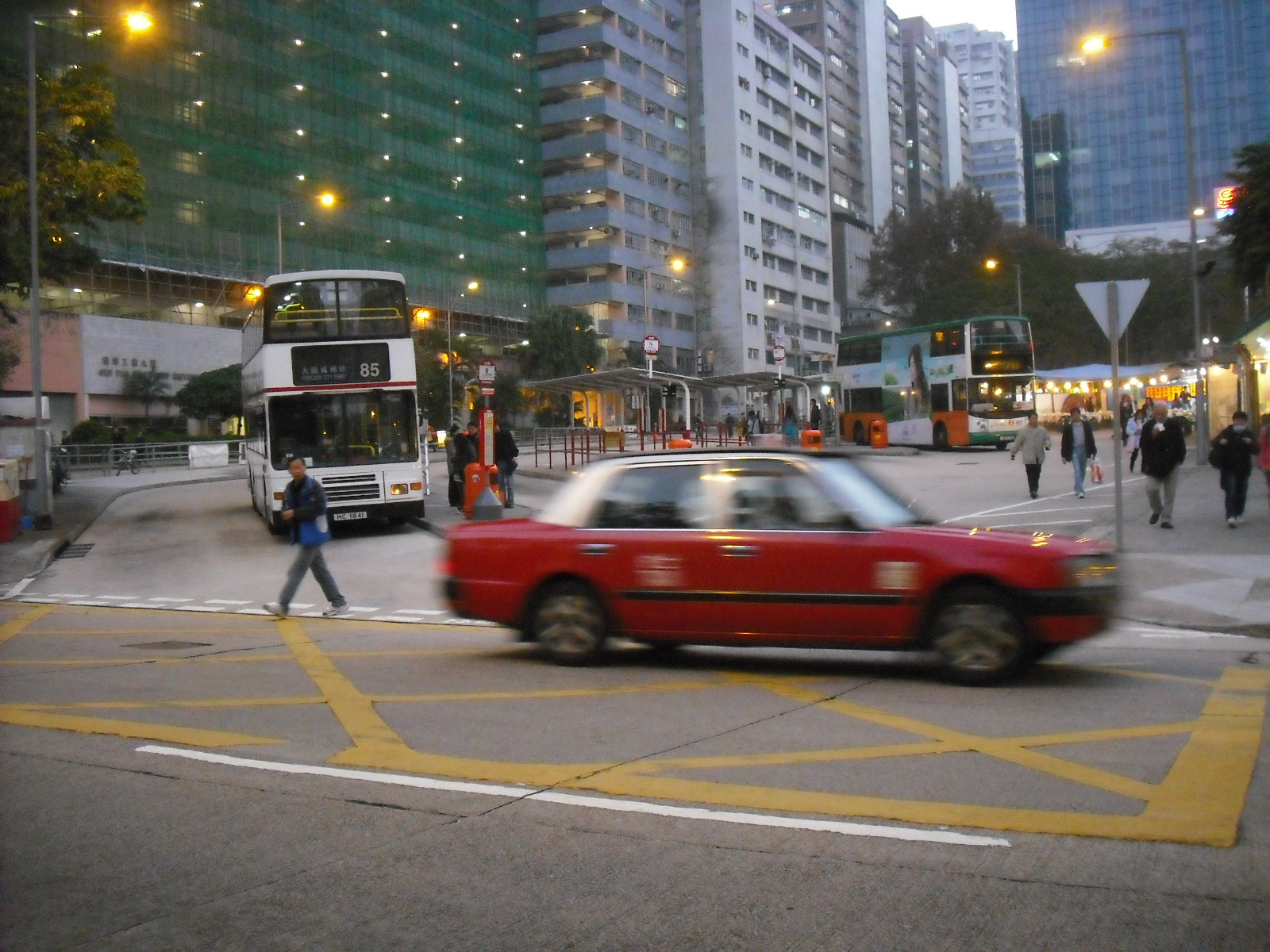
Shan Mei Street Public Transport Interchange, Fo Tan

A.S. Watson Group has its head office in the Watson House (Chinese: 屈臣氏中心) in Fo Tan.

== Education ==
Fo Tan is in Primary One Admission (POA) School Net 91. Within the school net are multiple aided schools (operated independently but funded with government money); no government schools are in this net.

Schools in Fo Tan:

- Sha Tin College
- Sha Tin Junior School
- Jockey Club Ti-I College
- Hong Kong Sports Institute
- Chinese University

== Transportation ==
- Fo Tan station on the East Rail line
- Buses and minibuses
- taxis

== See also ==
- List of areas of Hong Kong
- Ho Tung Lau
