= Lok Lo Ha =

Village and valley in Hong Kong

Coordinates: 22.4019°N 114.2006°E

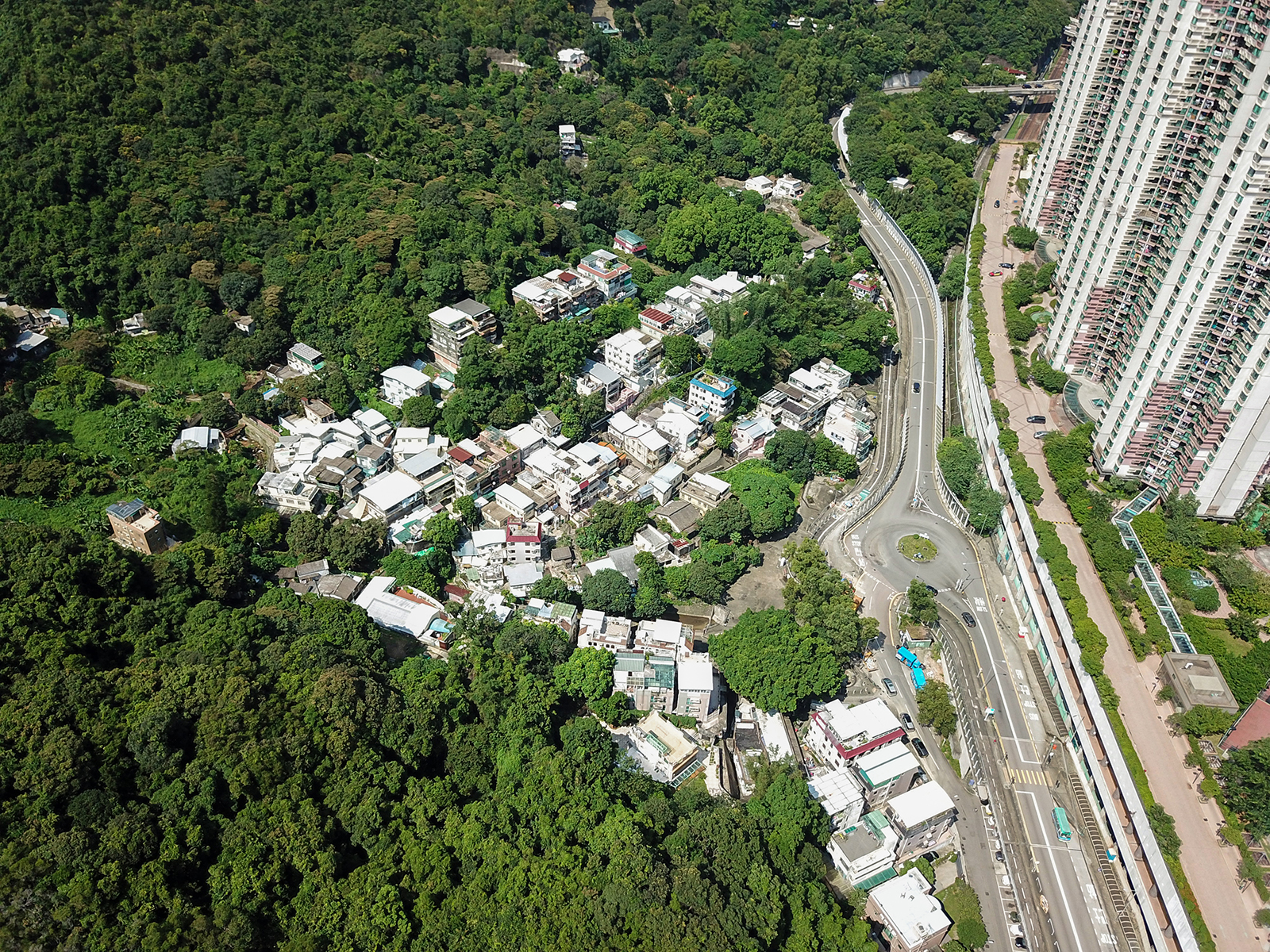
Lok Lo Ha.

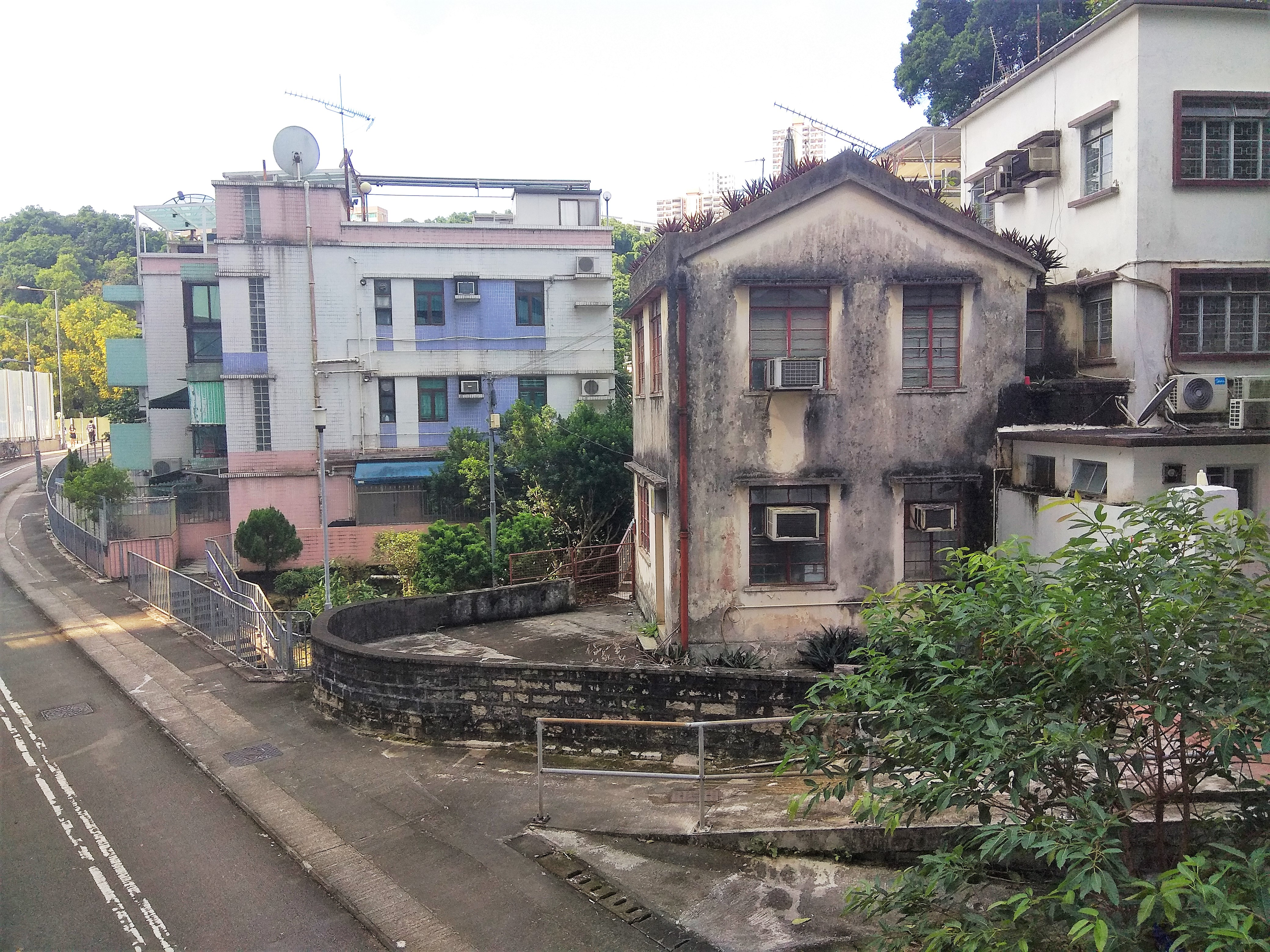
Lok Lo Ha.

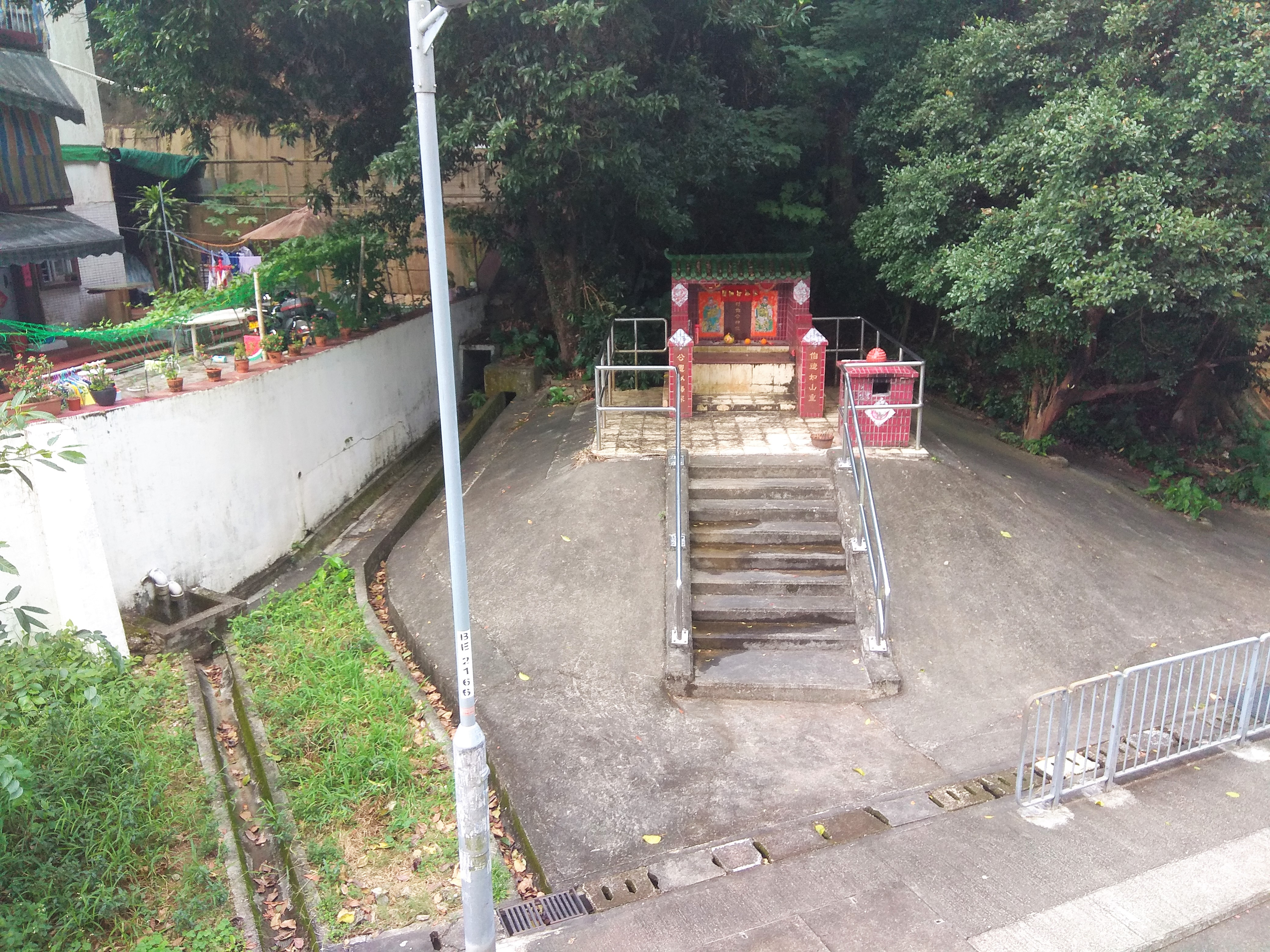
Shrine in Lok Lo Ha.

Lok Lo Ha (Chinese: 落路下) is a village and valley northeast of Wo Liu Hang in Fo Tan, Sha Tin District, Hong Kong.

== Administration ==
Lok Lo Ha is a recognized village under the New Territories Small House Policy.

== History ==
Lok Lo Ha was historically a sea-shore village. A stone pier for the sampan ferry to Yuen Chau Kok was built at Lok Lo Ha in 1917.

In February 2018, a KMB bus on route 872 passed by this stop, overturning a few stops later, killing 19. It has been noted that the name of the village literally means “falling down from the road”, which coincidentally describes the bus accident.

== See also ==
- Ho Tung Lau
- Kau Yeuk (Sha Tin)
