= Hong Kong Sports Institute =

Athletic training centre in Shatin, Hong Kong

Coordinates: 22°23′41.88″N 114°12′07.44″E

- Former names: Jubilee Sports Centre (1982–1991)
- Established: 31 October 1982; 44 years ago
- Chief Executive: Tony Choi 蔡玉坤
- Location: 25 Yuen Wo Road, Sha Tin, New Territories, Hong Kong
- Campus: Urban
- Website: hksi.org.hk

Hong Kong Sports Institute
- Traditional Chinese: 香港體育學院
- Simplified Chinese: 香港体育学院
- Jyutping: hoeng1 gong2 tai2 juk6 hok6 jyun6*2
Transcriptions
Standard Mandarin
- Hanyu Pinyin: Xiānggǎng Tǐyù Xuéyuàn
Yue: Cantonese
- Jyutping: hoeng1 gong2 tai2 juk6 hok6 jyun6*2

The Hong Kong Sports Institute (Chinese: 香港體育學院) is a sports institute located in Sha Tin, New Territories, Hong Kong. It is mandated to provide training to athletes, and also offers academic qualification in the field of sports training. The institute sponsors elite athletes and trains them as full-time employees, based on their talent and potential. The campus is located on reclaimed land on the bank of the Shing Mun River, next to the Sha Tin Racecourse.

== History ==
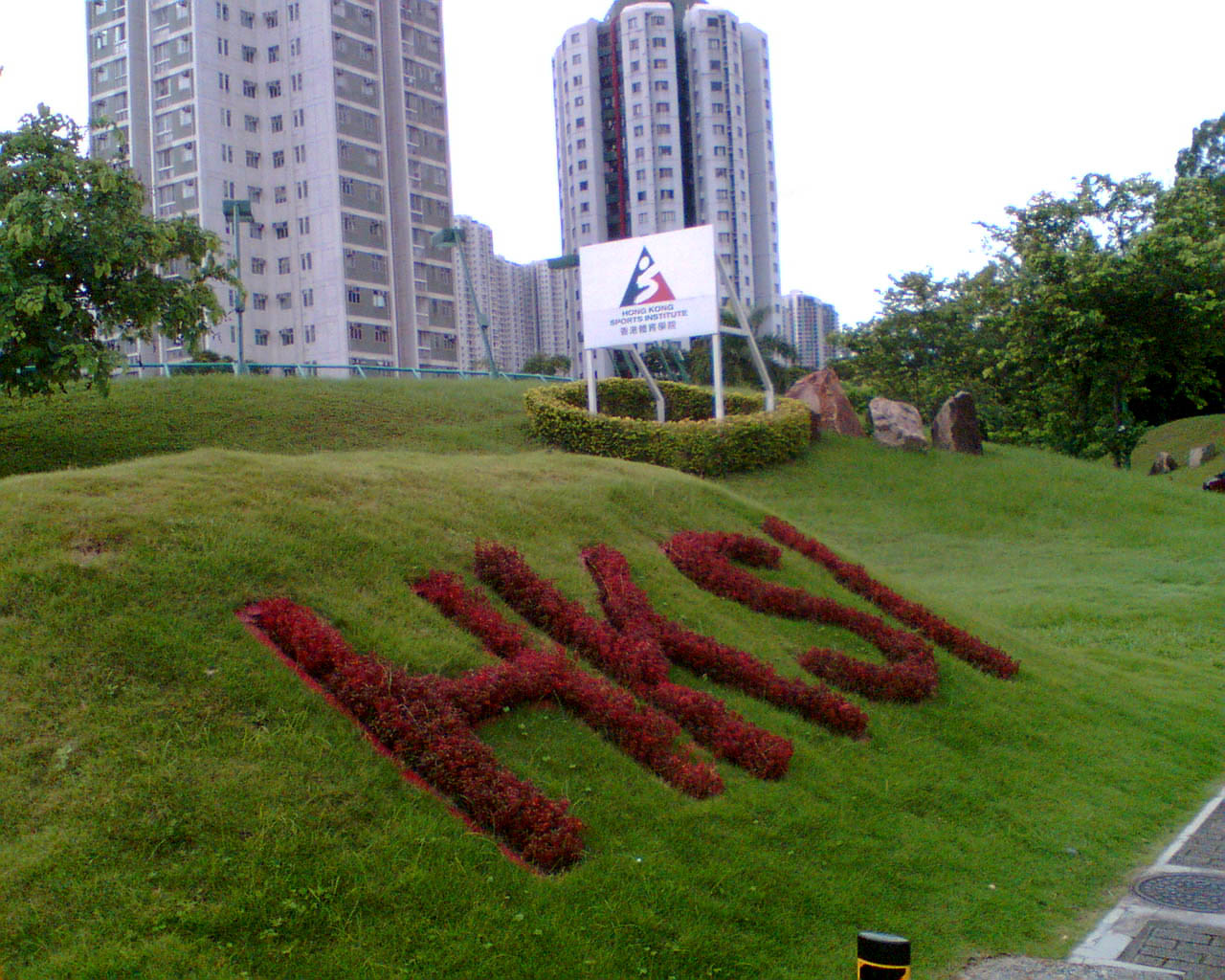
HKSI signage

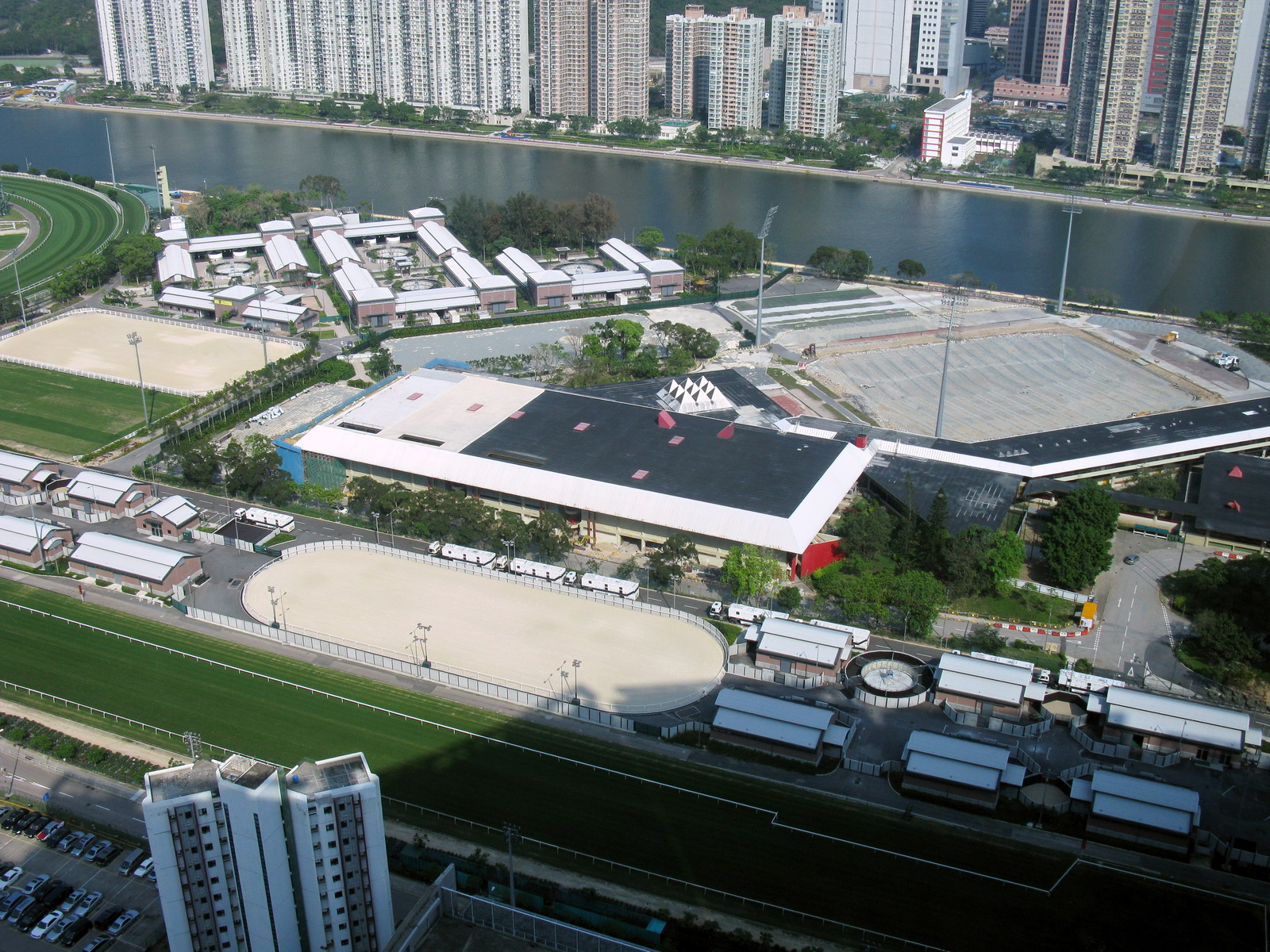
Aerial view of the institute

The institute, then called the Jubilee Sports Centre (JSC), was envisioned to provide "top class coaching and training for promising and outstanding" athletes, with an emphasis on training young people and in providing a great variety of activities and programmes. The Jubilee Sports Centre Ordinance was enacted in 1977. Sir Alberto Rodrigues, chairman of the JSC Board, stated in 1977, "we do not see any sports excluded" and explained that the aim was to improve sports standards in the territory and that the centre would seek out skilled athletes to provide them further training.

A 41-acre site beside the new Sha Tin Racecourse was chosen and construction was financed jointly by the Royal Hong Kong Jockey Club and the government, with additional support from the Queen's Silver Jubilee Fund. The thus-named Jubilee Sports Centre was opened by Prince Edward, Duke of Kent on 31 October 1982. It was originally managed by the Jockey Club.

By 1986, the Jockey Club sought to make the Jubilee Sports Centre and Ocean Park independent entities, reportedly on the advice of the government to focus on racing activities following doping and fixing scandals and on the club's own policy to "leave the management responsibilities to an independent body once the club-financed projects can stand firm on their feet". At the time, Ocean Park was making a profit of around $1 million per year, while the JSC was operating on a deficit. These operating costs were covered by the Jockey Club, Hong Kong's largest charity. Financial control was transferred from the Jockey Club to the JSC board of directors, and the club paid the centre a $350 million grant designed to cover operating expenses up to 2007. By 1991, it was reported that the centre was on track to exhaust these funds "well before" 2007.

In 1989, the Executive Council recommended the establishment of the Hong Kong Sports Development Board to bolster athletic training in the territory, and "envisaged that, in support of such objectives, the Jubilee Sports Centre should be developed into a Hong Kong Sports Institute". Secretary for Home Affairs Peter Tsao moved a name change bill in the Legislative Council in February 1991 to "reflect more accurately its role in promoting sport". The centre was renamed "Hong Kong Sports Institute" later that year.

The institute was the site of equestrian events of the 2008 Summer Olympics. In order to make way for the Olympic Games, the sports institute temporarily relocated to the YMCA Wu Kai Sha Youth Village in January 2007 and the Hong Kong Jockey Club took over the site to prepare it for competition.

== Recent expansion ==
In the 2006-2007 edition of the policy address, the Chief Executive announced a major redevelopment of the HKSI "to provide world-class training facilities to elite athletes in Hong Kong". The government allocated $1.8 billion for this redevelopment in 2008. Many new facilities have been constructed in the years since, and existing venues were refurbished.

The outdoor velodrome beside the Fo Tan Nullah was dismantled. In its place a nine-storey Main Building was erected to house offices, hostels for local and visiting athletes, a canteen, conference and lecture rooms, a 400-seat auditorium, and related ancillary facilities. The Main Building opened in 2013. To replace the cycle track, a temporary velodrome was built at Whitehead, Wu Kai Sha, to serve athletes until the indoor Hong Kong Velodrome opened in Tseung Kwan O New Town in 2014.

The existing 25-metre swimming pool was joined by a new Olympic-size swimming pool, with the two venues integrated into a single indoor complex. At the north end of the campus a new multi-purpose sports centre was built, housing a new tenpin bowling alley, squash courts, and a martial arts training centre. The architect for the redevelopment of the HKSI was P&T Architects and Engineers.

== Facilities ==
- running/cycling track
- football/rugby pitch
- 120-metre covered warm-up track
- international size indoor swimming pool
- 25-metre indoor swimming pool
- squash courts
- 12-lane bowling centre
- martial arts training venue
- boccia venues
- badminton hall
- tennis courts
- table tennis hall
- rowing centre
- fencing area
- sport science laboratories
- sport medicine clinics
- fitness training centre

== Funding ==
The HKSI has an annual budget of HK$700 million from the Hong Kong government. It is funded by the Elite Athletes Development Fund, established in 2012 with HK$7 billion in taxpayer funds, and given another HK$6 billion in 2019.

In August 2021, the government announced that it would apply for HK$990 million in funds to speed up construction of a new facility at HKSI. The government also announced that it would spend HK$150 million as a "booster fund" for HKSI's sports science and medical support.

In 2023, the government allocated HK$860 million to HKSI.

== Sports ==
It supports 20 tier A sports, not all of which are Olympic sports, such as squash, wushu, and tenpin bowling. It supports 13 other sports as tier B, most of which are not Olympic sports. However, some Olympic sports with National Sports Associations recognized by the Sports Federation and Olympic Committee of Hong Kong, such as Olympic weightlifting, are not supported in either tier A or tier B. The vast majority of funding goes to tier A sports.

Sports supported by HKSI
Tier	Sport	Olympic sport?
A	Athletics	
A	Badminton	
A	Billiard Sports	No
A	Cycling	
A	Equestrian	
A	Fencing	
A	Gymnastics	
A	Karatedo	Temporary, only for Tokyo 2020
A	Rowing	
A	Rugby Sevens	
A	Sailing	
A	Skating	
A	Squash	No
A	Swimming	
A	Table Tennis	
A	Tennis	
A	Tenpin Bowling	No
A	Triathlon	
A	Windsurfing	
A	Wushu	No
B	Contract Bridge	No
B	Dance Sports	No
B	Dragon Boat	No
B	Golf	
B	Judo	
B	Kart	No
B	Lawn Bowls	No
B	Life Saving	No
B	Mountaineering	No
B	Orienteering	No
B	Roller Sports	
B	Shuttlecock	No
B	Taekwondo	

=== Elite sports selection ===
HKSI has been criticized for its selection of its 20 tier A and 13 tier B sports. Pui Kwan-kay, the head of Hong Kong's Olympic delegation, has said that the HKSI's elite system places emphasis and funding on sports which have already won medals or have gotten good results, creating a cycle which keeps those sports growing, but keeps other lower-profile sports, which have potential, from growing. For example, out of 60 recognized National Sports Associations, only 20 of them have been selected as tier A elite sports. Yeung Tak-keung, Sports Commissioner of Hong Kong, said that the government may conduct a review to determine whether the criteria for tier A sports needed to be changed, but it would first need to collect opinions from stakeholders.

Chung Pak-kwong, professor at Baptist University and former chief executive of HKSI, has said that though Hong Kong at the 2020 Summer Olympics won 6 medals, it took longer than expected to get those medals, as Hong Kong had invested 40 years and billions of HKD, mostly into developing tier A sports. For example, Chung said that with the money spent, Hong Kong at the 2016 Summer Olympics should have won medals; instead, 0 medals were won. Chung also that the 20 tier A sports needed to be reviewed, and that some of the current tier A sports "may not even be able to achieve any breakthrough in the coming years", giving a reason to reclassify them to non-elite sports.

A senior sports official also commented and told SCMP that Hong Kong should adopt a more "medal-oriented strategy" and that HKSI should focus on funding sports which Asians have excelled at, stating "If we look at the sports won by our Asian counterparts in the Tokyo Games - such as shooting, archery or those with a weight category such as judo, weightlifting, karate or taekwondo - these are sports in which Asians are not at a disadvantage to stronger, bigger Westerners. However, it is very difficult for athletes from these sports to get Tier-A support from the sports institute."

Athletes and coaches who talked to SCMP also expressed hope that there would be changes in the elite sports system. One example is that tier A athletes can get up to HK$41,030 in funding each month, while tier B athletes receive less funding and support, a gap "too big" which could hamper the winning of medals in less-popular sports. Funding is also linked to performance at competitions, which gives younger athletes who are still developing their skills a disadvantage, as it creates a cycle where the more senior and best athletes are given funding. Chris Perry, head rowing coach at HKSI, said that youth needed to be funded, or else it would be too late to develop them into medal-winning athletes. A separate SCMP editorial agreed and said that youth in non tier A sports are at a disadvantage.

After the multiple public requests to change elite sports selection, the chairman of HKSI, Lam Tai-fai, said that he was hesitant to add more sports, claiming that in doing so, "the overall quality would slip" for elite sports.

Tony Choi Yuk-kwan, deputy executive director of the HKSI, said that "The Asian Games are our main target and the Olympic Games are our ultimate goal", however of the 20 top tier A sports, 5 of them, or 25%, are not Olympic sports.

In October 2023, despite winning a gold medal at the 2022 Asian Games, Hong Kong Golf Club captain Andy Kwok said that HKSI did not support golf as an elite sport. Another opinion article stated that golfers in the city had no government facilities to train in. SCMP published an article, which stated that "But the HK$7.4 billion (US$945 million) that the government says has been spent in the past decade on the development of sportsmen and women needs to be accounted for, and in gymnastics, athletics and elsewhere, it is time to ask some hard questions."

An opinion article released in July 2024 noted that eligibility for HKSI is based on sport, rather than athletes, so National Sports Associations need to perform well in order for elite athletes to be selected. The author also noted that lacking access to the HKSI is an obstacle for sports and athletes to develop into elite sports in the first place, and that funding is diverted to elite sports rather than growing other sports into an elite level.

In July 2024, a vice chairman of the HKSI, Vincent Cheng Wing-shun, said that the current tiers of sports should be reviewed to better identify elite athletes and develop middle-tier athletes.

== Other criticism ==
In April 2024, the HKSI did not allow spectators to attend a qualifying competition for Hong Kong's Olympic swimming team, citing internal policy, despite having a swimming venue with the ability to host 1,500 spectators.

In August 2024, concerns were raised that government subsidies for athletes through HKSI were too low, with one athlete saying the monthly stipend was like "pocket money."

== Transportation ==
The institute is linked to Fo Tan station on the East Rail line via a footbridge spanning the Tai Po Road. It is also accessible via the extensive cycle track network serving Sha Tin.
