= Fo Tan station =

MTR station in the New Territories, Hong Kong

Fo Tan 火炭
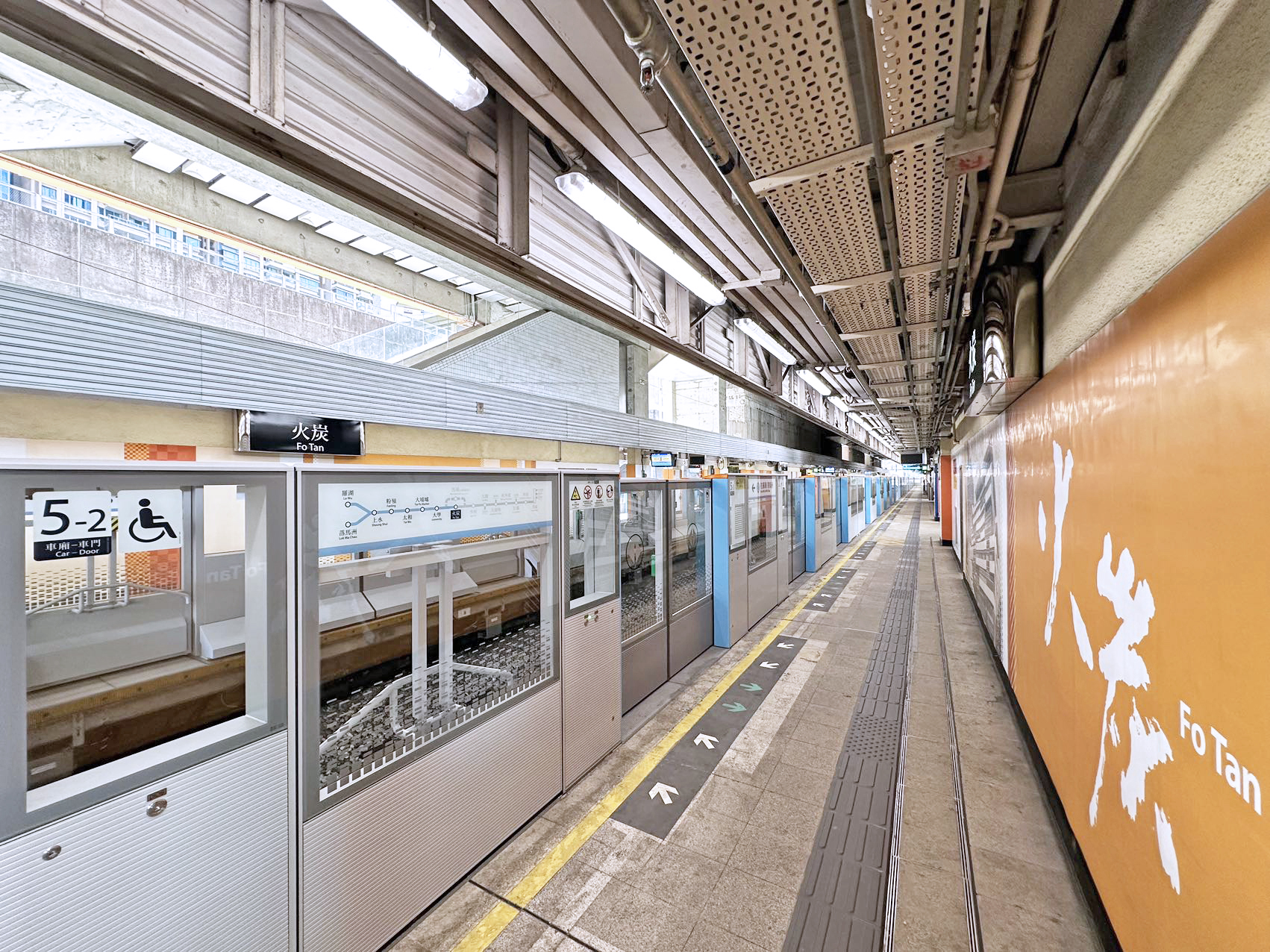
- Platforms in October 2024

Chinese name
- Chinese: 火炭
- Jyutping: fo^{2} taan^{3}
- Hanyu Pinyin: Huǒtàn
Transcriptions
Standard Mandarin
- Hanyu Pinyin: Huǒtàn
Yue: Cantonese
- Yale Romanization: Fó taan
- IPA: [fɔ˧˥.tʰan˧]
- Jyutping: fo^{2} taan^{3}

General information
- Location: Lok King Street, Fo Tan; Sha Tin District, Hong Kong
- Coordinates: 22°23′43″N 114°11′54″E
- System: MTR rapid transit station
- Owner: KCR Corporation
- Operator: MTR Corporation
- Line: East Rail line
- Platforms: 4 (2 island platforms)
- Tracks: 3
- Connections: Bus, minibus

Construction
- Structure type: At-grade
- Platform levels: 1
- Accessible: Yes

Other information
- Station code: FOT

History
- Opened: 15 February 1985; 41 years ago

Services
Preceding station	MTR	Following station
Sha Tin towards Admiralty	East Rail line	University towards Lo Wu or Lok Ma Chau
Track layout
Location
- Location within MTR

Fo Tan (Chinese: 火炭; Jyutping: fo^{2} taan^{3}; Cantonese Yale: Fó taan) is a station on the East Rail line of the Mass Transit Railway (MTR) system in Hong Kong. It is located in the Fo Tan area of Sha Tin District, between Sha Tin and University stations on the East Rail line's main branch. The Racecourse is located parallel to Fo Tan, on the line's Racecourse branch. Its livery is orange.

The passenger station serves some apartment buildings, villages, and a medium-sized industrial zone, as well as the Fo Tan Railway House of the MTRC. During rush hour, some northbound trains terminate at this station before departing southwards. Some trains do not run through this station on race days, and are instead diverted to stop at the Racecourse.

== History ==
Fo Tan station opened on 15 February 1985, two years after the total electrification of the railway. It was featured at the end of the 1989 film Mr. Coconut, starring Tony Leung Ka-fai.

== Fo Tan Goods Yard ==
In addition, two tracks spur off at the northeast of the station, and lead into a goods yard north of the station. Freight trains stopped there regularly before their demise on the East Rail line in 2010; the yard has since been used occasionally for rolling stock deliveries.

== Station layout ==
The station has three tracks, with two island platforms between.

Trains normally stop at platforms 1 and 4. The centre track is used for special departures during peak hours or heading to the depot. Southbound trains arriving at Fo Tan Station after 11pm also use the centre track instead to minimize noise pollution towards the adjacent residential complexes.

C	Southern Concourse	Exit A & B, Customer Service Centre
C	Southern Concourse	Shops, vending machines, ATMs & toilets
C	Northern Concourse	Exit C & D, Customer Service Centre
C	Northern Concourse	Shops, vending machines & ATMs
Platforms (G/F)	Platform 1	East Rail line towards Lo Wu or Lok Ma Chau (University) →
Platforms (G/F)	Island platform, doors will open on the left, right
Platforms (G/F)	Platform; 2 ↑ / 3 ↓	East Rail line towards Lo Wu or Lok Ma Chau (University) → ← East Rail line towards Admiralty (Sha Tin) (For special departures in either direction during specific times)
Platforms (G/F)	Island platform, doors will open on the left, right
Platforms (G/F)	Platform 4	← East Rail line towards Admiralty (Sha Tin)

== Entrances/exits ==
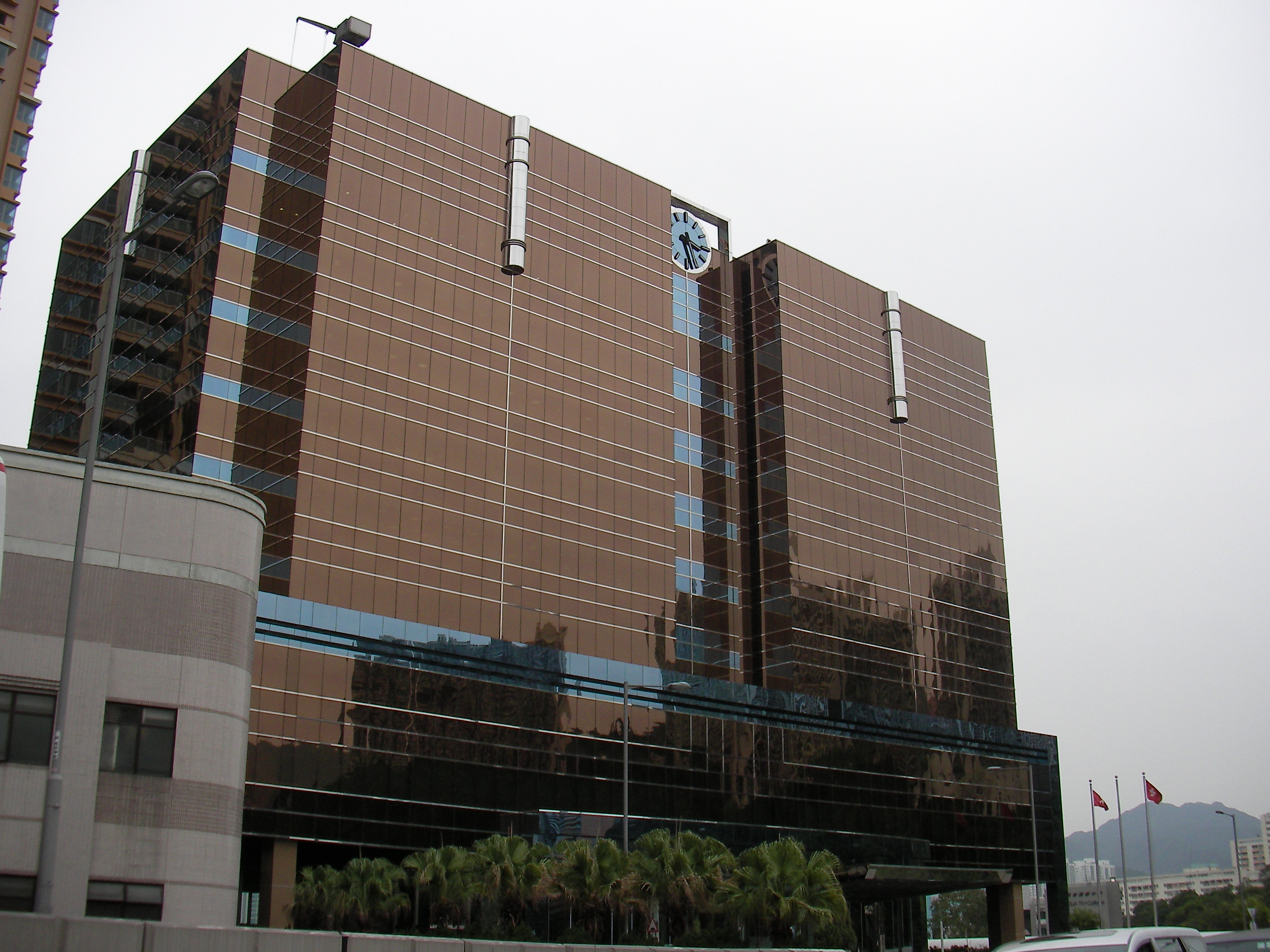
Fo Tan Railway House in January 2009

Originally, the southern concourse was the only concourse in this station. Because the two concourses were built in separate years, they were not originally interconnected. MTR renovated the station in 2015, connecting the two concourses in the process. The new link opened on 12 December 2015.

Southern concourse

- A: Fo Tan Railway House
  - Fo Tan Railway House, IVE (Sha Tin), Hong Kong Sports Institute, Jockey Club Ti-I College, Sha Tin Rowing Centre
- B: Sui Fai Factory Estate
  - Sui Fai Factory Estate, Fo Tan Road, Fo Tan Tsuen, Shan Mei Street, Shatin Galleria, Sui Wo Court, Chun Yeung Estate

Northern concourse

- C: The Palazzo
  - The Palazzo, Ficus Garden, Immigration and Registration of Persons, Jubilee Court, Jubilee Garden, Lok Lo Ha Village, Plaza Ascot, Royal Ascot
- D: Au Pui Wan Street
  - Au Pui Wan Street, MTR Ho Tung Lau Depot, Wo Liu Hang Village

== Gallery ==
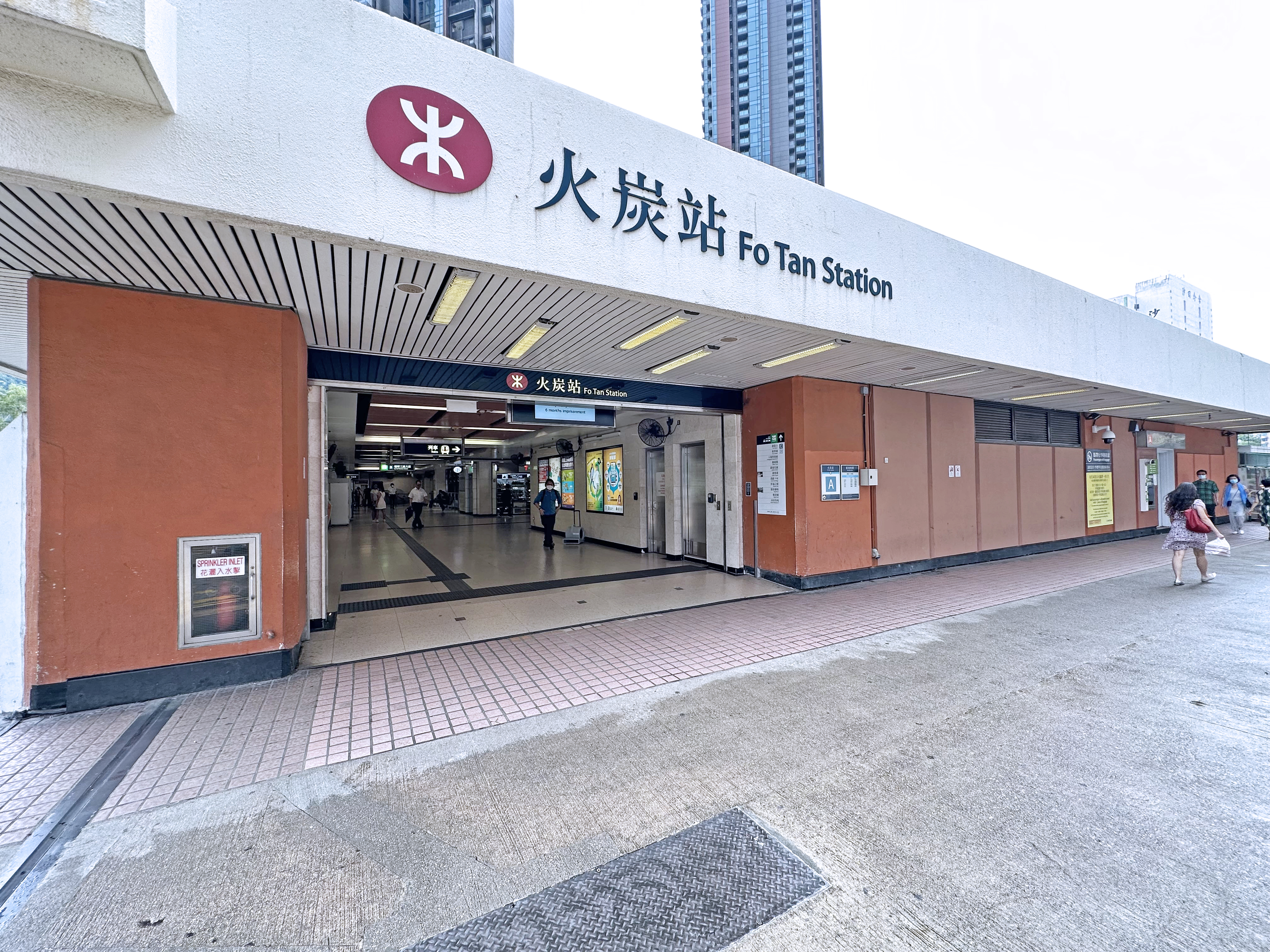
Exit A (July 2023)

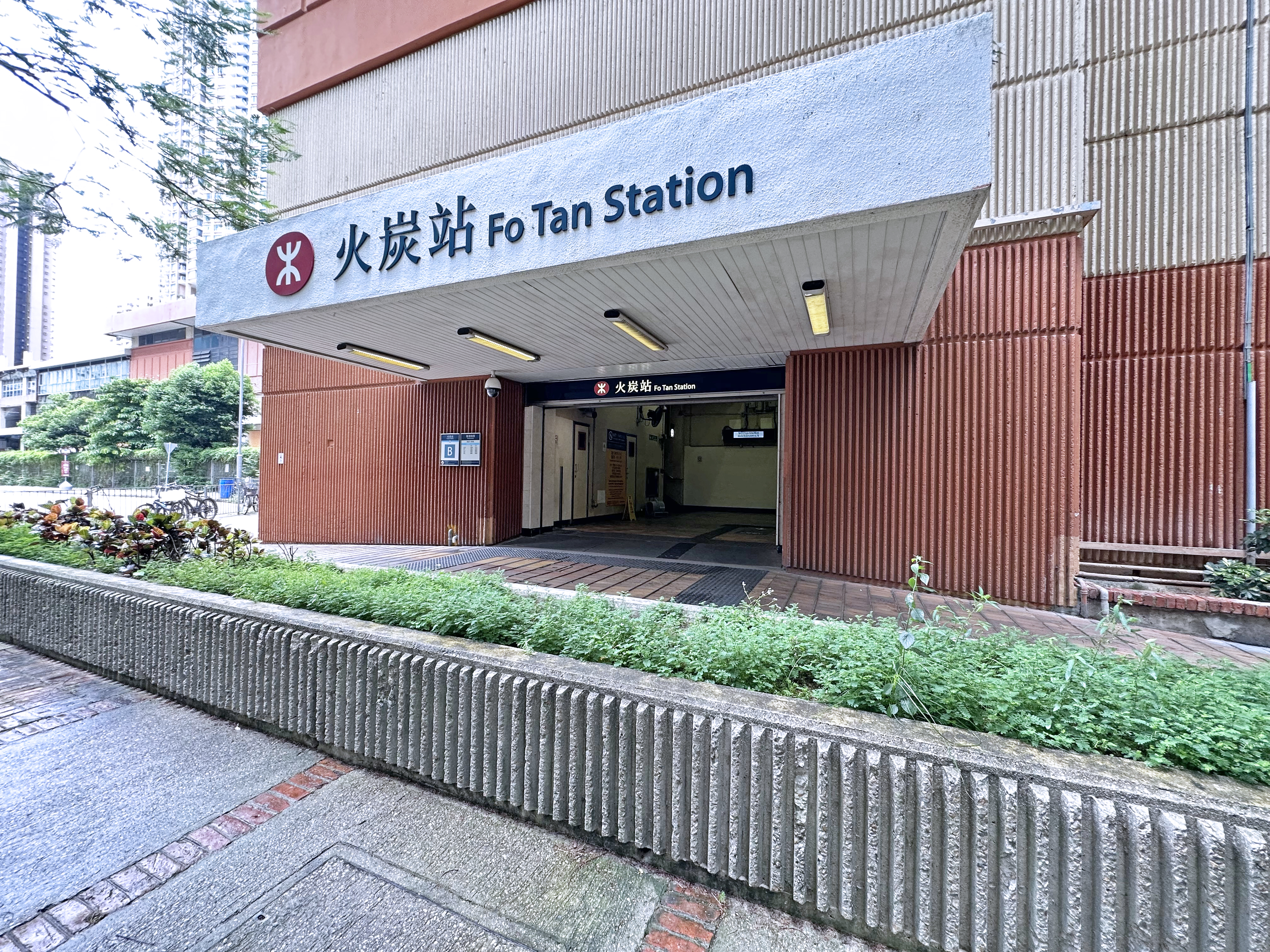
Exit B (July 2023)

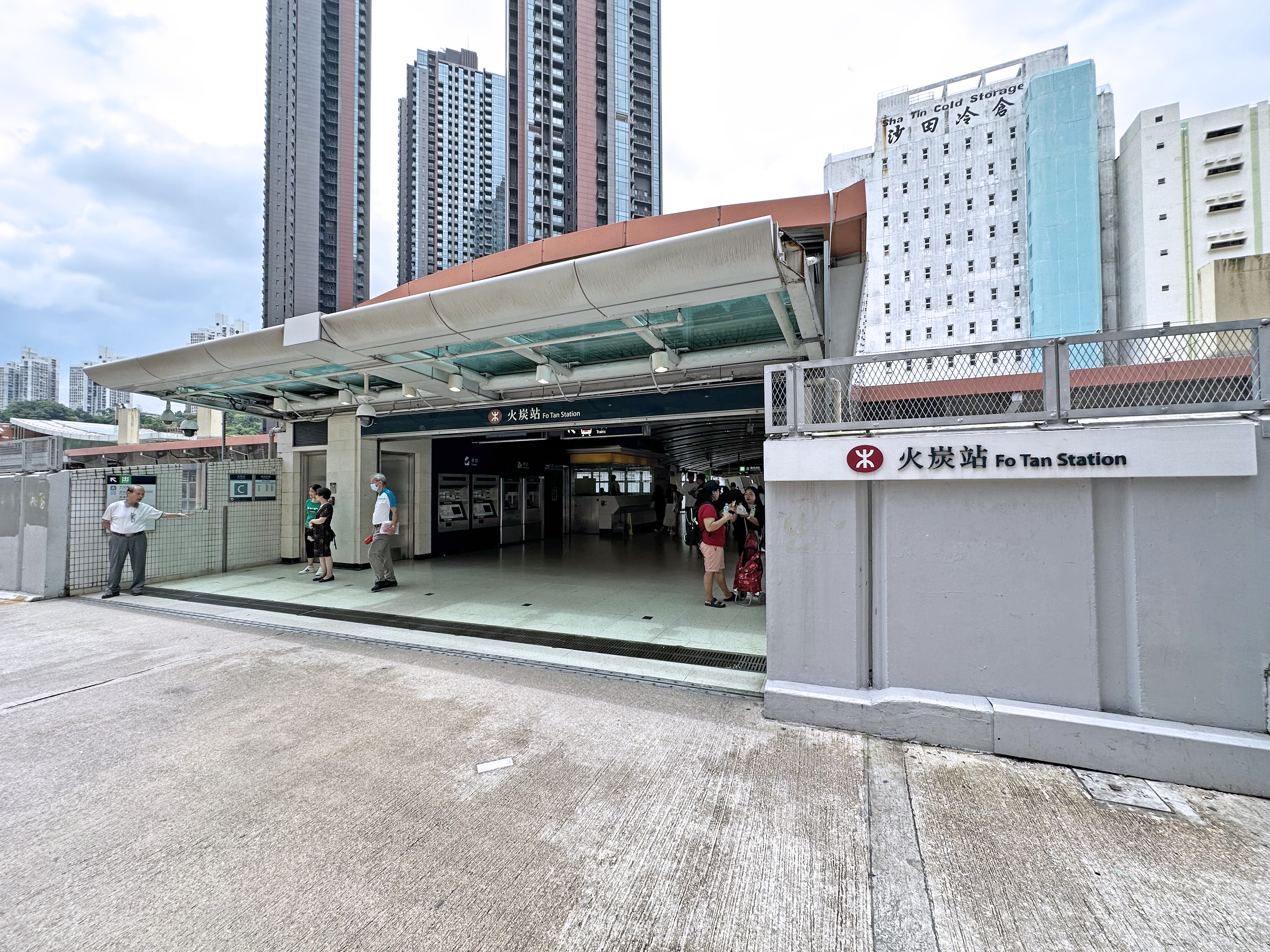
Exit C (July 2023)

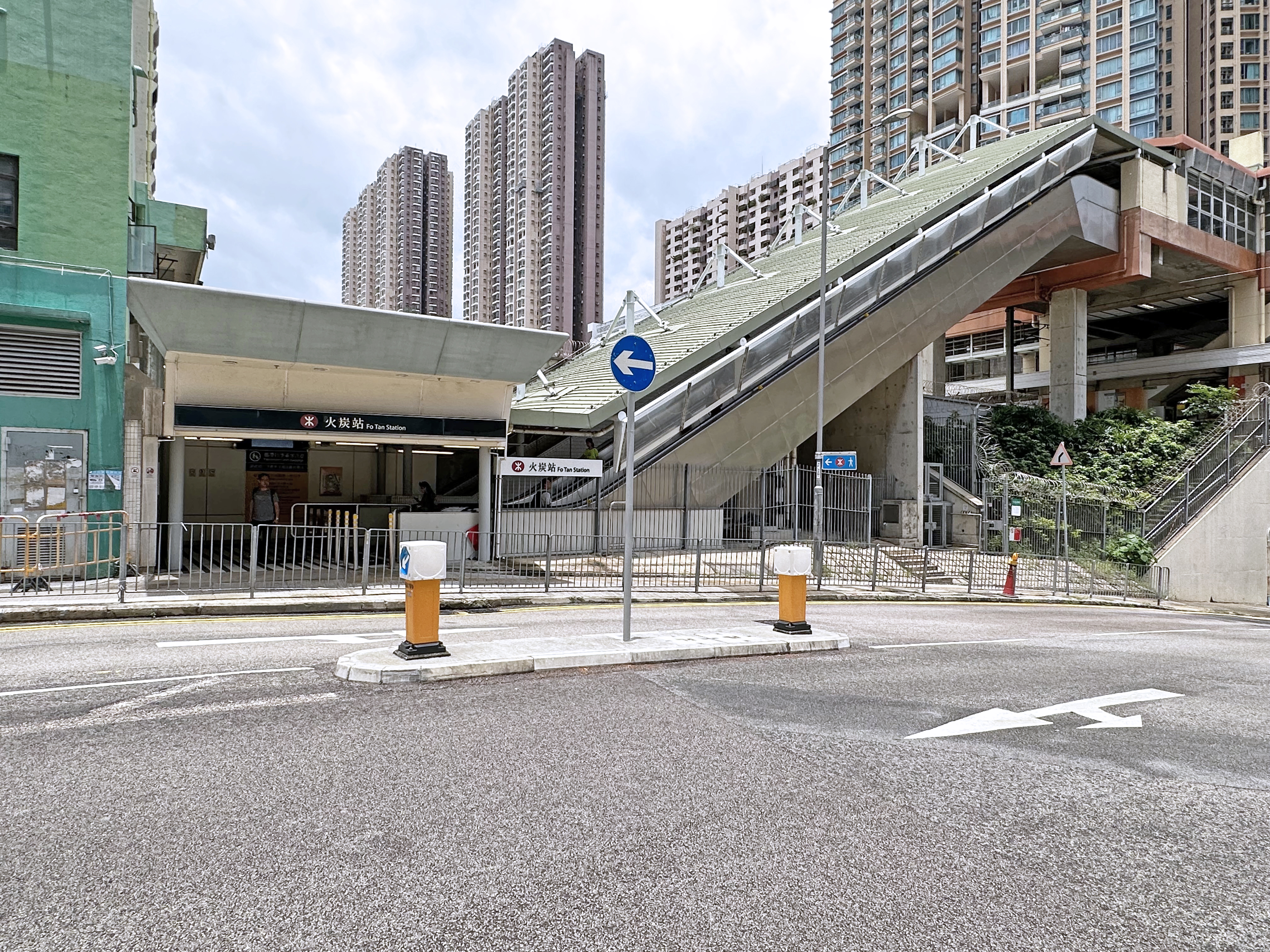
Exit D (July 2023)
