= Jubilee Garden (Hong Kong) =

Housing estate in Shatin, Hong Kong

Coordinates: 22°23′50″N 114°12′00″E

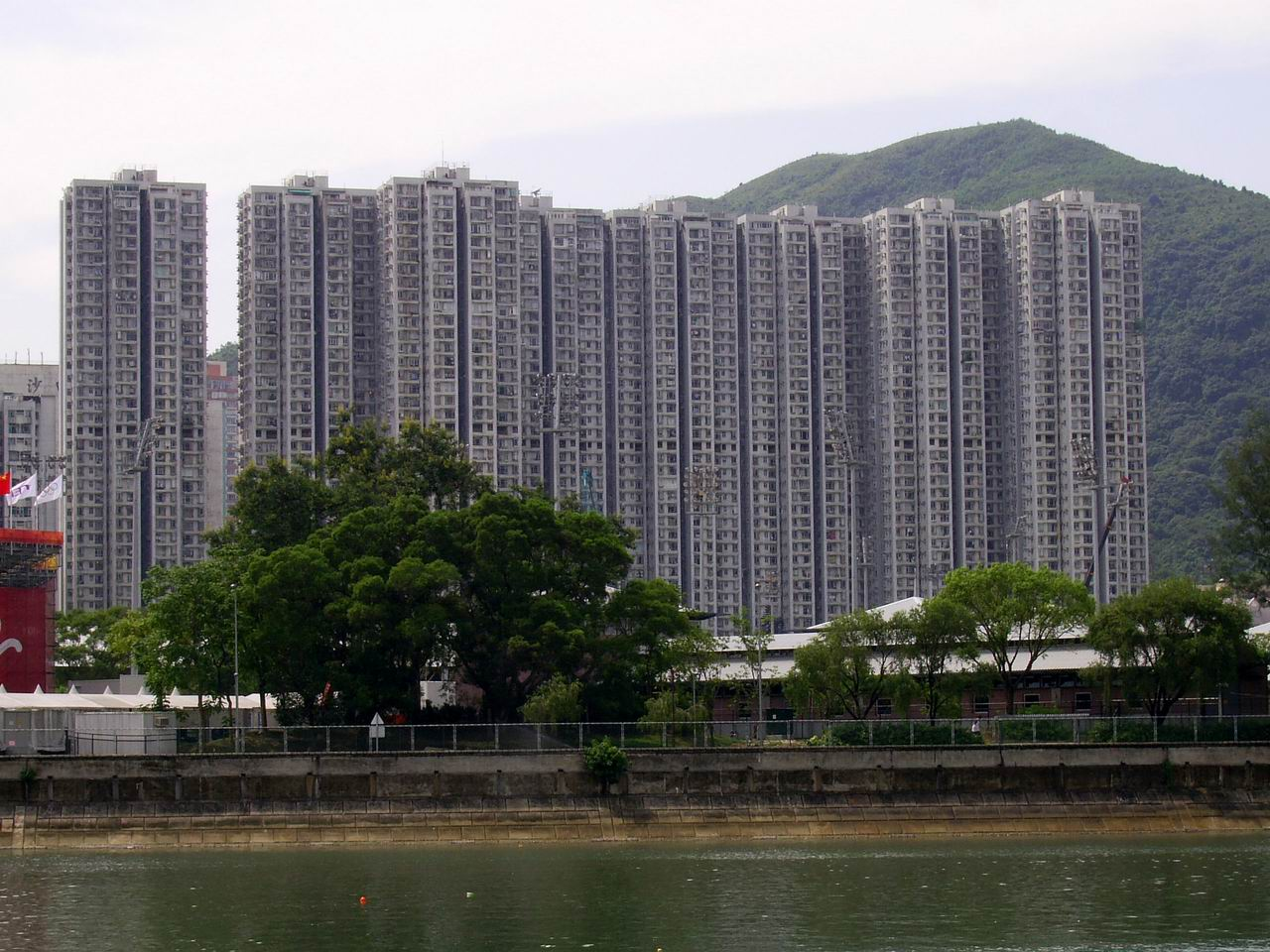
Jubilee Garden and Shing Mun River

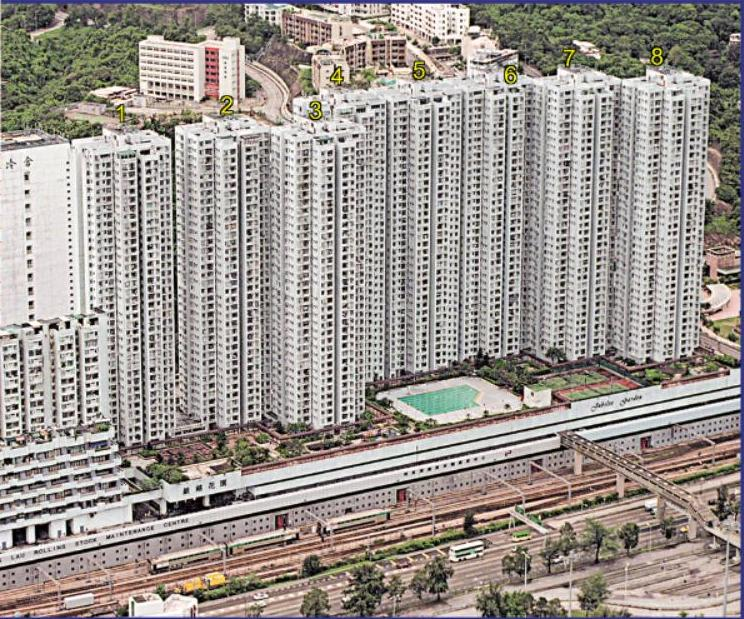
Jubilee Garden and the MTR Ho Tung Lau Maintenance Centre and Depot, facing Tai Po Road.

Jubilee Garden (Chinese: 銀禧花園) is a private housing estate situated at 2-18 Lok King Street, Fo Tan, Sha Tin District, New Territories, Hong Kong. It is located near the MTR Fo Tan station and right next to Sha Tin Racecourse.

== Overview ==
There are 9 blocks of residential buildings providing a total of 2,260 units of apartment and duplex condo. The buildings have 18-34 stories with units ranging from an area of 448 square feet (41.6 m^{2}) to an area of 1,117 square feet (103.8 m^{2}). 8 different floor plans are available.

== History ==
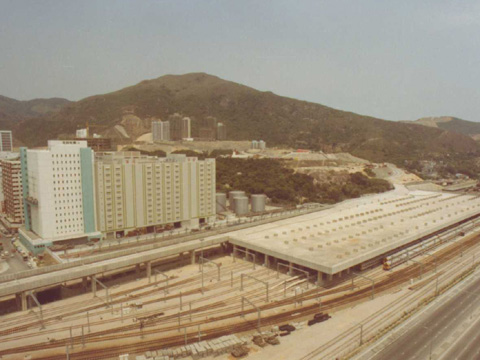
Ho Tung Lau maintenance centre before the residential developments

Jubilee Garden was built by Cheung Kong Holdings and Kowloon-Canton Railway Corporation during the 1980s and it was the first large-scale property development in Lok King Street, Fo Tan. Jubilee Garden was also the first large-scale residential development by the KCRC. It was built above a podium over the stabling tracks of Ho Tung Lau maintenance centre of the KCRC.

The construction of the Jubilee Garden apartments was completed in two stages (completion date):

- Stage One - Blocks 4 to 8 (1985)
- Stage Two - Blocks 1 to 3 (1986)

The Ho Tung Lau maintenance centre was later upgraded in three phases between 1989 and 1995. The Royal Ascot, jointly developed by Sun Hung Kai Properties and KCRC, was built above it, and was fully occupied by April 1997.

== Resident facilities ==
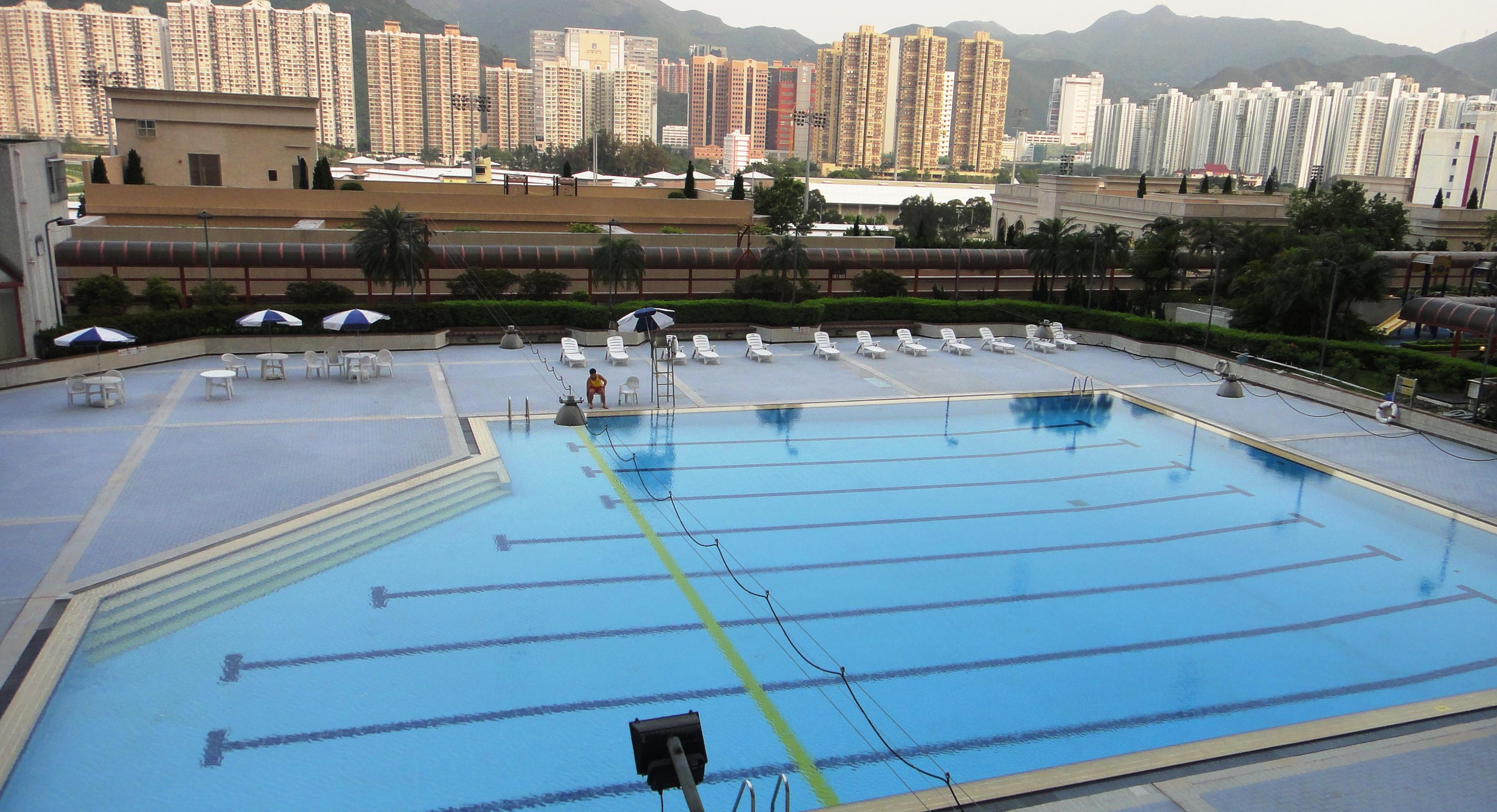
Swimming pool of Jubilee Garden

- Garden podium
- Outdoor swimming pool
- Tennis courts
- Basketball court
- Table tennis rooms

== Transportation ==
It is in proximity to the MTR East Rail line (Fo Tan station).
