= Wo Liu Hang =

Village in Hong Kong

Coordinates: 22.398878°N 114.196995°E

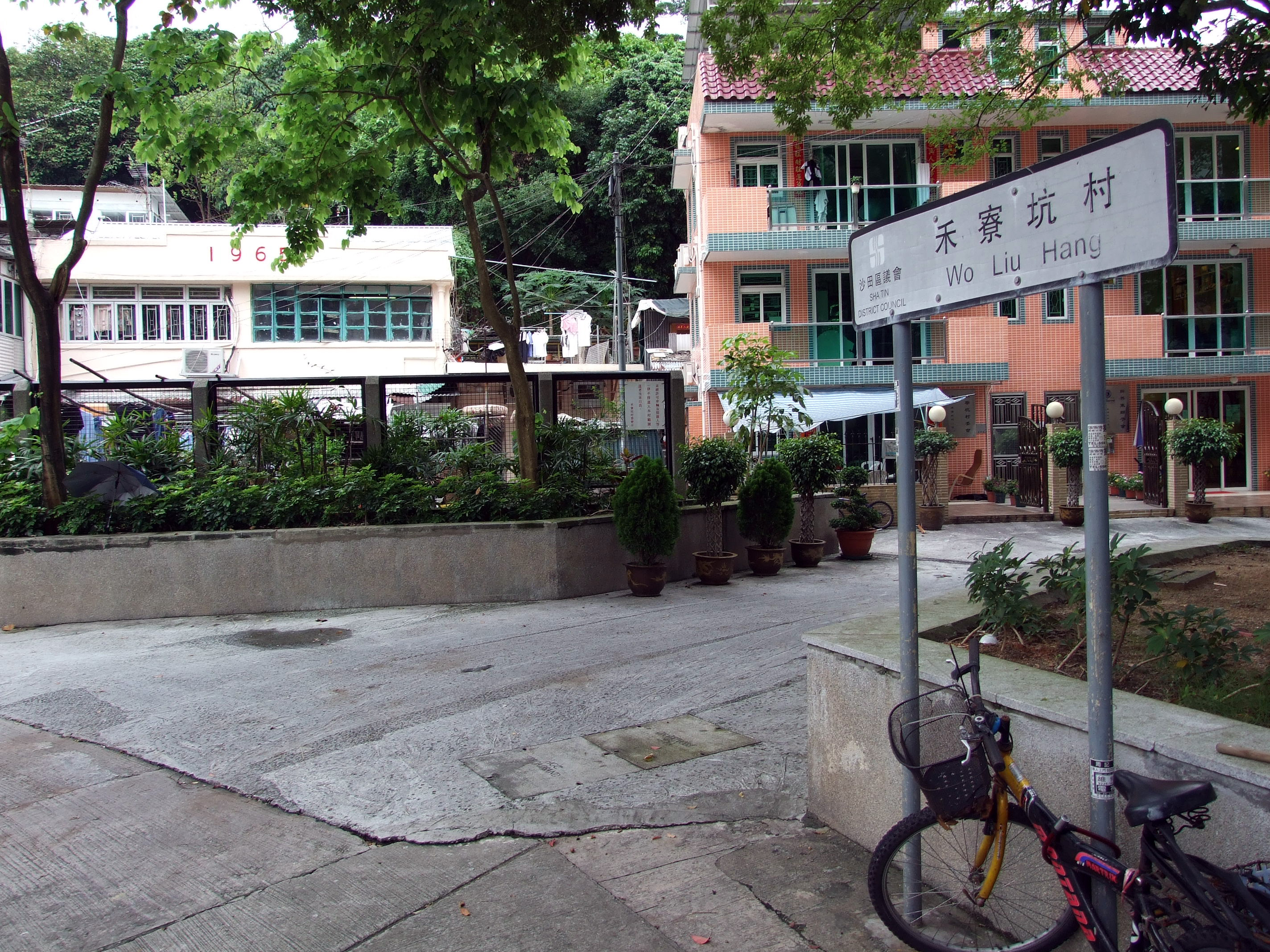
Wo Liu Hang Village

Wo Liu Hang (Chinese: 禾寮坑) is a village in Fo Tan, Hong Kong. The place was formerly a small plain at the shore of Sha Tin Hoi. The plain to the south has been transformed into an industrial area and a village has been erected in the hilly north. On the reclaimed land nearby, MTR Fo Tan station has been built, along with the Ho Tung Lau Depot of the network.

Wo Liu Hang has a history of about one hundred years.

== Administration ==
Wo Liu Hang is a recognized village under the New Territories Small House Policy. It is one of the villages represented within the Sha Tin Rural Committee. For electoral purposes, Wo Liu Hang is part of the Fo Tan constituency, which is currently represented by Lui Kai-wing.

== See also ==
- Kau Yeuk (Sha Tin)
