= The Palazzo (Hong Kong) =

Housing estate in Fo Tan, Hong Kong

Coordinates: 22.394744°N 114.199182°E

The Palazzo 御龍山
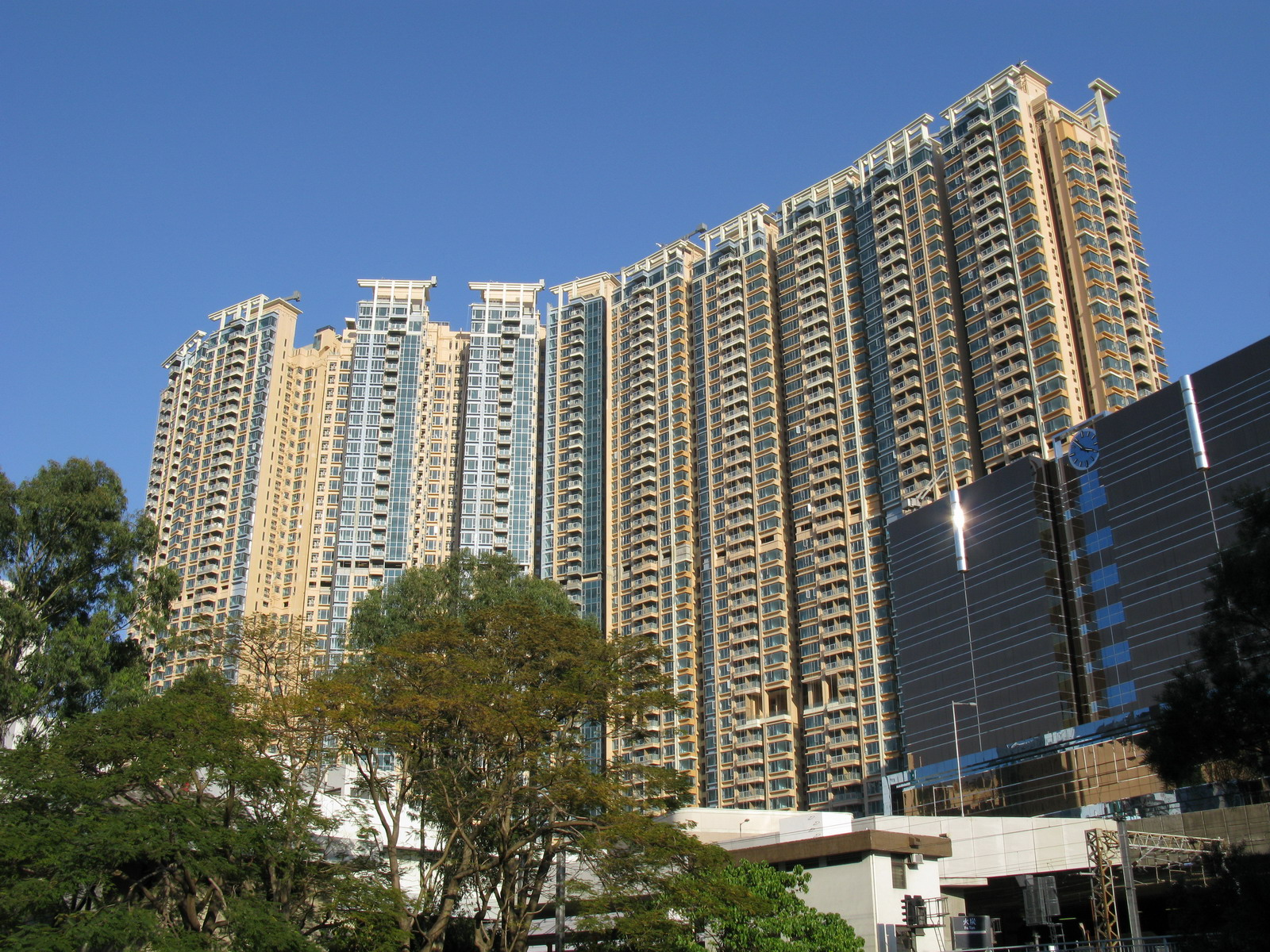
- Interactive map of the The Palazzo 御龍山 area

General information
- Type: Private Residential
- Location: 28 Lok King Street, Sha Tin, New Territories, Hong Kong
- Completed: March 2009; 17 years ago

Technical details
- Floor count: Total of 10 blocks (1-3, 5-11) with 35-39 floors of flats (57-65 floors)

Design and construction
- Developer: Sino Land and MTR Corporation

Other information
- Facilities: Large Resident's Club House

Website
- The Palazzo

The Palazzo (Chinese: 御龍山) is a large privately owned residential property located next to Fo Tan station in Fo Tan of Sha Tin District, Hong Kong. A pedestrian bridge connects The Palazzo to the station. Jointly developed by Sino Land and the MTR Corporation, it has a total of 1,375 flats as well as 230 parking spaces. The Palazzo was sold off-plan starting in May 2008, while construction completed in March 2009. Currently, The Palazzo is managed by Premier Management Services, a subsidiary of the MTR Corporation.

== Residential Units ==
The Palazzo consists of 10 towers lined in a wave formation. The towers are 57 to 65 floors high, providing a total of 1,375 residential units, each with an area of 648 to 4,178 square feet. Each unit consists of a balcony and two to four bedrooms while the flats have high ceiling heights of 10 feet 4 inches (3.15 m) to 10 feet 11 inches (3.33 m). Located in the highest floors of The Palazzo are 11 special flats collectively known as the Palazzo Villa, having floor areas of 2,019 to 4,178 square feet, including five penthouses each with a private 1.4m deep pool.

== Club House ==
The resident's club house, also known as The Palazzo Derby, was designed by Hirsch Bedner Associates and built at a cost of HKD $1 billion. The Palazzo Derby is 500 meter long and takes up an area of 220,000 square feet. Inspired by European palaces, the club house contains many facilities, including a Roman-styled indoor bath and swimming pool, sauna, indoor multi-purpose sports room, fitness room, bowling area, billiard room, games room, dance room, hydrotherapy room, Karaoke room, music room, mini cinema and tennis courts. The Palazzo Derby also contains a large outdoor swimming pool.
