= Fo Tan Nullah =

River of Hong Kong

Coordinates: 22.392560°N 114.199424°E

- Chinese: 火炭渠
- Cantonese Yale: fó taan kèuih
Transcriptions
Standard Mandarin
- Hanyu Pinyin: Huǒ Tàn Qú
Yue: Cantonese
- Yale Romanization: fó taan kèuih
- Jyutping: fo2 taan3 keoi4

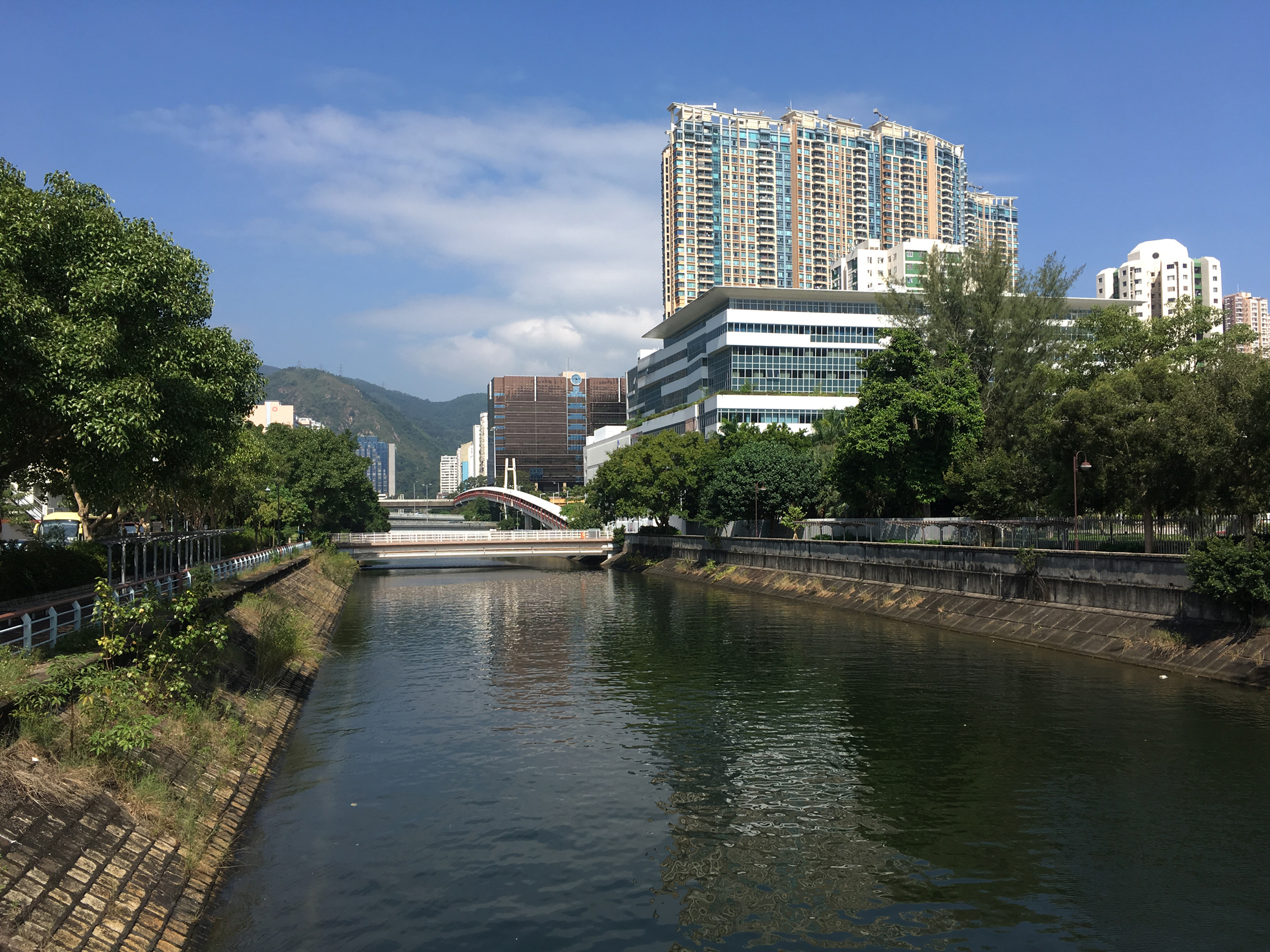
Fo Tan Nullah and Fo Tan Railway House

The Fo Tan Nullah (Chinese: 火炭渠) is one of the nullahs of the Shing Mun River in Fo Tan, Hong Kong.

== See also ==
- List of rivers and nullahs in Hong Kong
