= Royal Ascot, Hong Kong =

Housing estate in Fo Tan, New Territories

Coordinates: 22.3991°N 114.2010°E

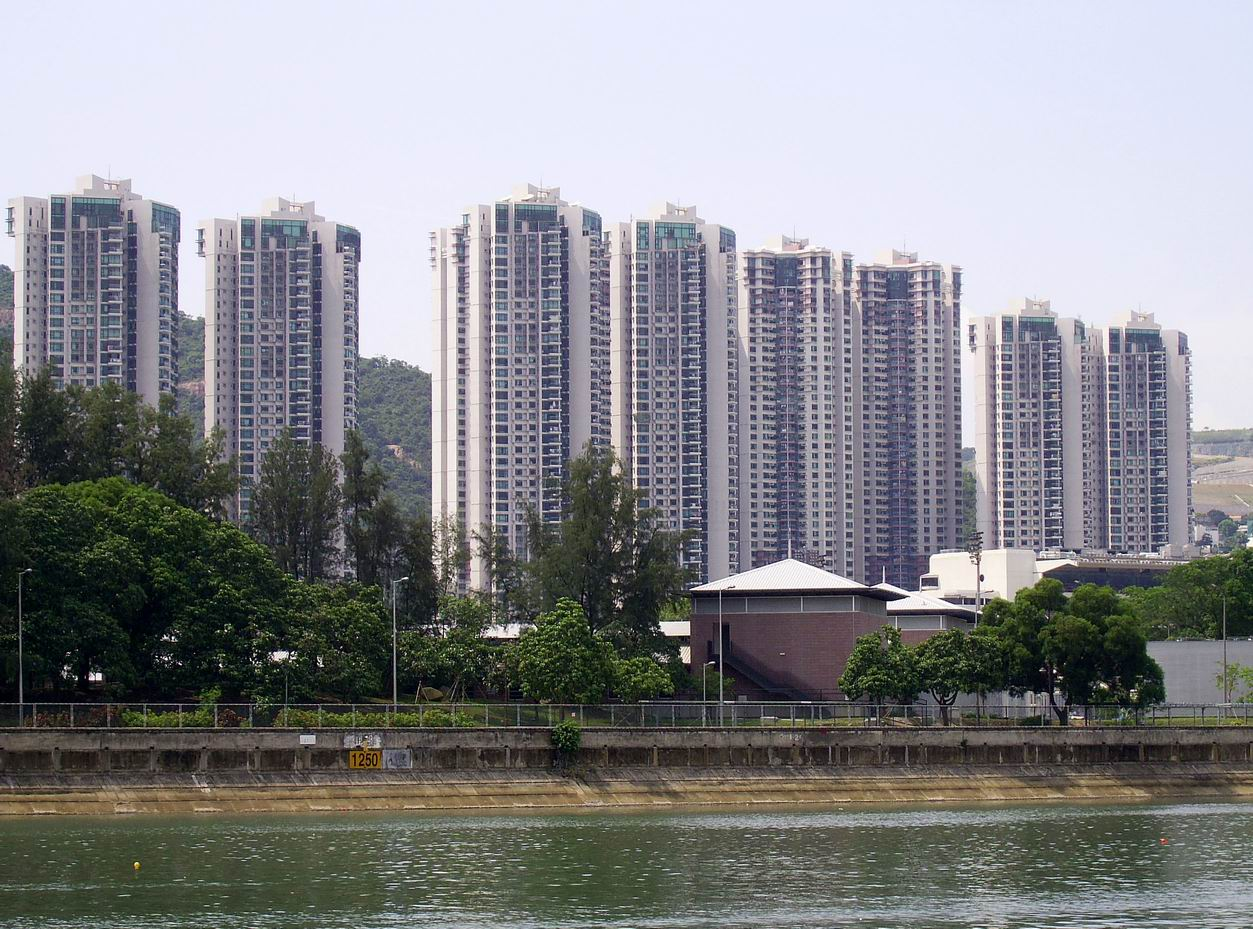
Royal Ascot and Shing Mun River in August 2008.

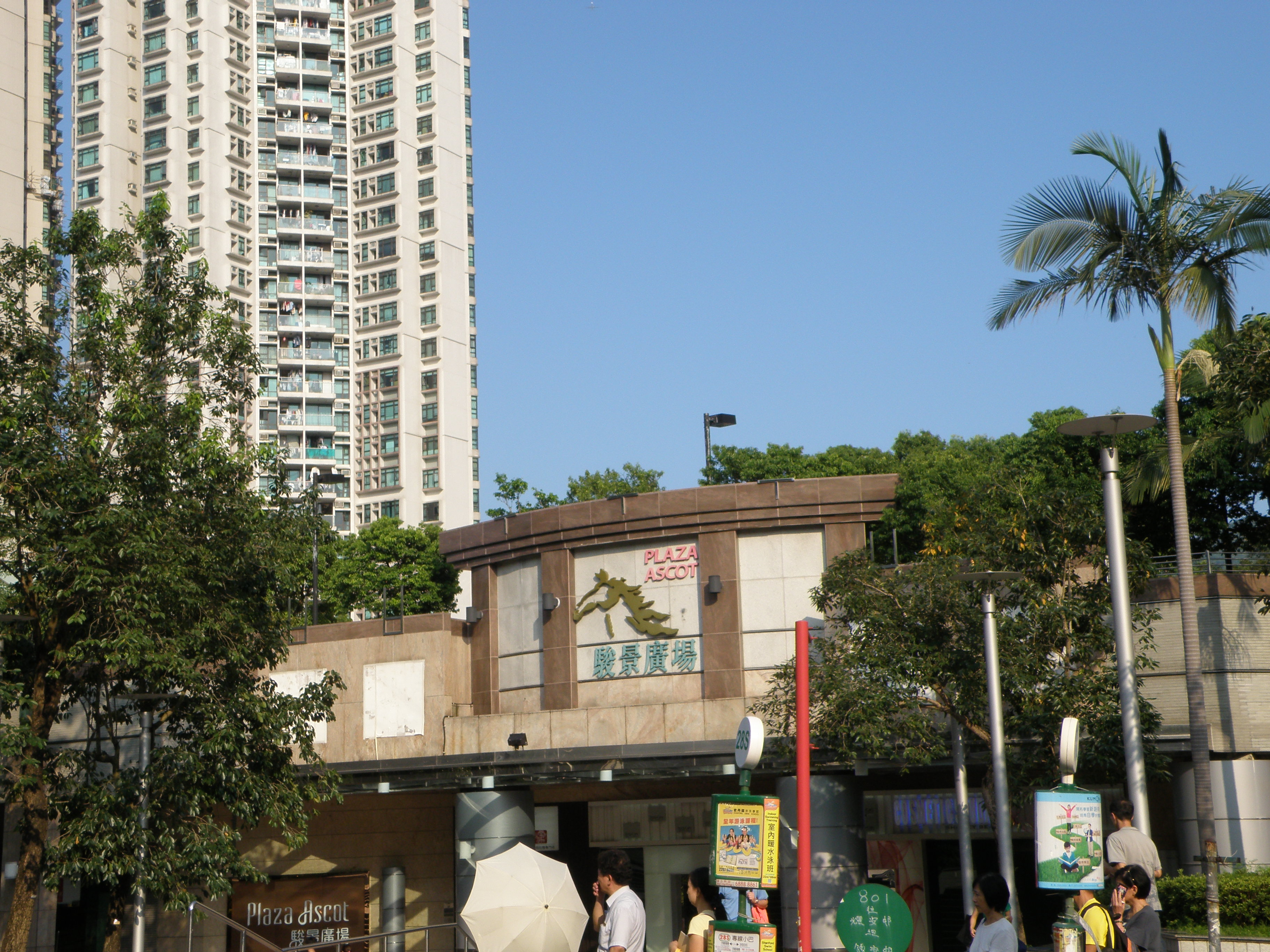
Plaza Ascot in September 2014

Royal Ascot (Chinese: 駿景園) is a private residential development in Fo Tan, Sha Tin District, Hong Kong, located above the MTR Ho Tung Lau railway depot. The development consists of 2,504 residential units in ten tower blocks, built in two phases: the first phase (six towers) completed in 1995, the remaining four towers were completed in 1996, and the estate was fully occupied by April 1997.

It was jointly developed by Sun Hung Kai Properties and the Kowloon-Canton Railway Corporation, and transferred to the MTR Corporation after the Rail Merger.

== Location ==
The development is opposite the Sha Tin Racecourse, which explains why the development was named Royal Ascot, after the well known English horse racing event. Similarly, the Chinese name means "Horse View Garden".

== Layout ==
Royal Ascot consists of ten blocks. Blocks 1-7 (phase 1) are at the front (Block 4 omitted according to superstitious beliefs - Tetraphobia), and Blocks 8-11 (phase 2) at the back. There is also a shopping mall (Plaza Ascot) and a car park. There are two entrances, one in Lok King Street and another from Tsung King Road (with vehicular access to the podium and residential car park).

== See also ==
- Jubilee Garden
