= Hip Tin temples in Hong Kong =

There are several Hip Tin temples (Chinese: 協天宮; Jyutping: hip3 tin1 gung1) in Hong Kong. Kwan Tai (Guan Yu) is worshiped in these temples.

Kwan Tai temples are also dedicated to Guan Yu. Man Mo temples are jointly dedicated to Man Tai (文帝) and Kwan Tai (aka. Mo Tai, 武帝).

Note 1: A territory-wide grade reassessment of historic buildings is ongoing. The grades listed in the table are based on these updates (8 June 2023). The temples with a "Not listed" status in the table below are not graded and do not appear in the list of historic buildings considered for grading.
Note 2: While most probably incomplete, this list of Hip Tin temples is tentatively exhaustive.

Location	Notes	Status	References	Photographs
Ma Wan Tsuen (馬環村), Lei Yue Mun (Kowloon) 22.286222°N 114.239838°E	The Hip Tin Temple is adjacent to the Tin Hau Temple (鯉魚門天后廟) and was added after 1953.	Grade III	Picture: Tin Hau Temple (left) and Hip Tin Temple (right).	
Shing Mun San Tsuen (錦田城門新村), Kam Tin, Yuen Long District 22.443783°N 114.066887°E	Hip Tin Temple, Shing Mun San Tsuen The temple is owned by the Cheng clan. It was probably built around 1920. It was relocated from Shing Mun Valley in the 1920s due to the construction of the Shing Mun Reservoir and the resulting resettlement of Shing Mun San Tsuen.	Nil grade		
Po Sam Pai (布心排), Plover Cove, Tai Po District 22.471122°N 114.210520°E	Hip Tin Temple, Po Sam Pai Built in 1823. The temple was renovated in 1889 and 1905.	Grade III		
No. 39 Ting Kok Road, Tai Po Kau Hui 22.454384°N 114.165728°E	Tin Hau Temple, Tai Po Kau Hui (大埔舊墟天后宮) Built in 1691. On the left of the Tin Hau Temple is Hip Tin Temple. On its right was Tam Sin Temple (譚仙宮) where Tam Kung was revered. The Tam Sin Temple was converted into a Shui Yuet Temple (水月宮) dedicated to Guanyin in the mid-2010s.	Grade III		
No. 53 Cheung Shue Tan (樟樹灘), Tai Po District 22.426229°N 114.200394°E	Hip Tin Temple, Cheung Shue Tan (樟樹灘村協天宮) Its year of construction is unknown. The temple was renovated in 1898, 1910 and 1997.	Grade III		
North of Ha Tei Ha. Shuen Wan area of Plover Cove, Tai Po District. 22.46694°N 114.2042°E	Hip Tin Temple One of the three temples of the Shuen Wan Temples complex (船灣三宮廟). The other ones are a Tin Hau Temple and a Temple of Confucius. The Sam Kung Temples complex had been destroyed by a typhoon in 1936 and was reconstructed in 2009.	Not listed		
Po Tung Road (普通道), Sai Kung Town 22.381110°N 114.270792°E	Tin Hau Temple and Hip Tin Temple (西貢墟天后古廟及協天宮) The two temples are believed to have been rebuilt in the 1910s to 1920s.	Grade II	Picture: Tin Hau Temple (left) and Hip Tin Temple (right) in Sai Kung.	
No. 2 Lai Chi Wo, Sha Tau Kok 22.526960°N 114.260350°E	Hip Tin Temple and Hok Shan Monastery Located on the square of Lai Chi Wo Village. Built in the Qing dynasty, they have a history of more than two hundred years. The two structures are connected. They were jointly built by the seven villages in Sha Tau Kok, Hing Chun Yeuk (慶春約), for drawing good fortune and expelling the evils. Hip Tin Temple is for Guan Di in which there is a statue of Guan Di while Hok Shan Monastery is for Guan Yin.	Grade III		
Just opposite the Sha Tau Kok Control Point, Shan Tsui Tsuen (山咀), Sha Tau Kok 22.549807°N 114.223473°E	Hip Tin Temple, Shan Tsui Tsuen Completed in 1895. It also has been used as a school.	Declared		
Kuk Po, Luk Keng, Sha Tau Kok 22.531481°N 114.233290°E	Kai Choi School and Hip Tin Temple, Kuk Po	Grade III		
Nam Chung Cheng Uk, Sha Tau Kok 22.520841°N 114.207034°E	Hip Tin Temple, Nam Chung (南涌協天宮)	Not listed		
Yim Tso Ha, Sha Tau Kok 22.531629°N 114.207451°E	Hip Tin Temple, Yim Tso Ha (鹽灶下協天宮)	Not listed		
Wu Shek Kok, Sha Tau Kok 22.536367°N 114.214527°E	Hip Tin Temple Adjacent to a Tin Hau Temple.	Not listed	Picture: Tin Hau Temple (left) and Hip Tin Temple (right).	

== See also ==
- Martial temple
- Man Mo temples in Hong Kong
- Kwan Tai temples in Hong Kong
- Tin Hau temples in Hong Kong
- Places of worship in Hong Kong
