= Tin Hau temples in Hong Kong =

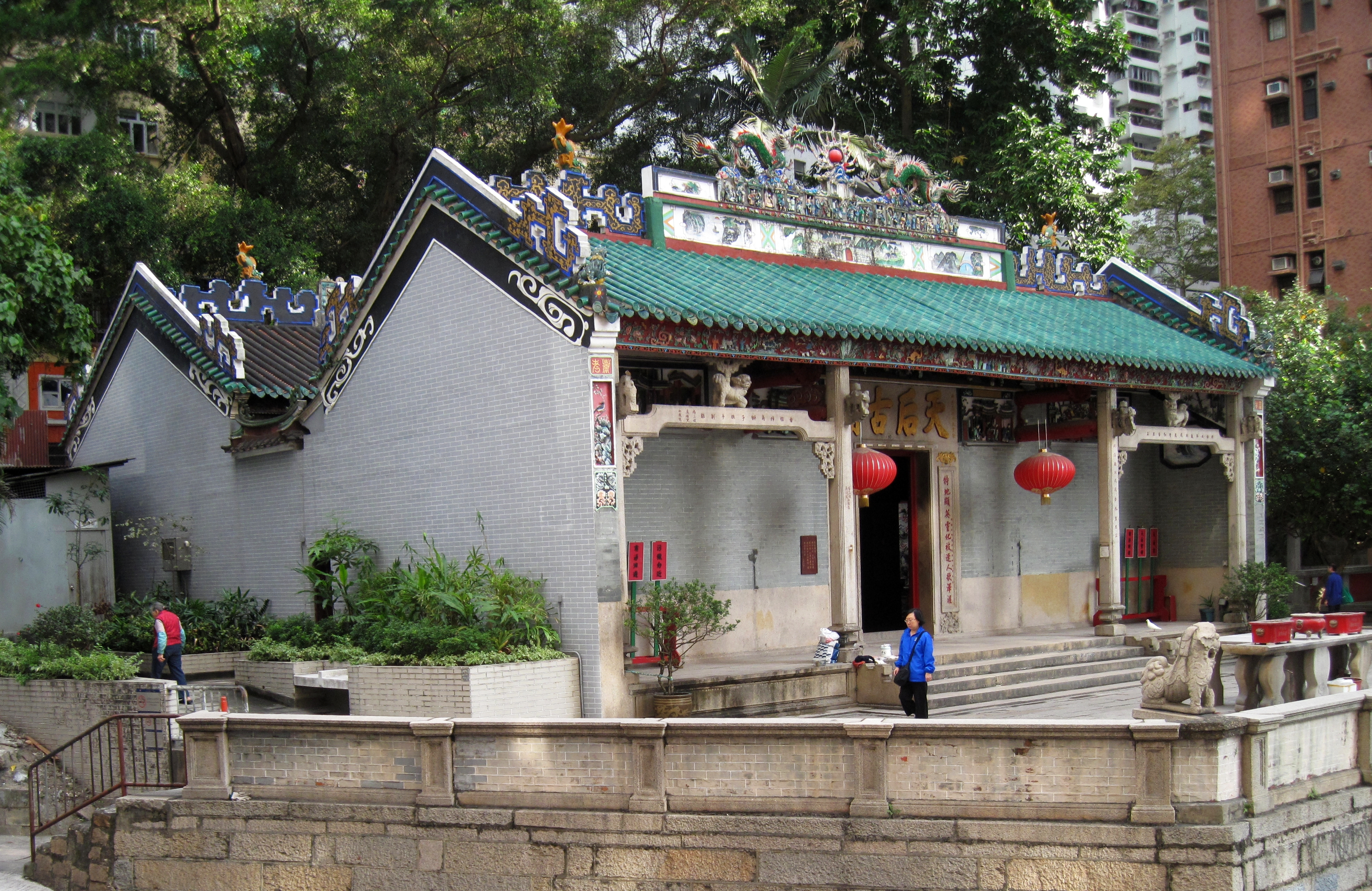
Tin Hau Temple, Tin Hau, Causeway Bay

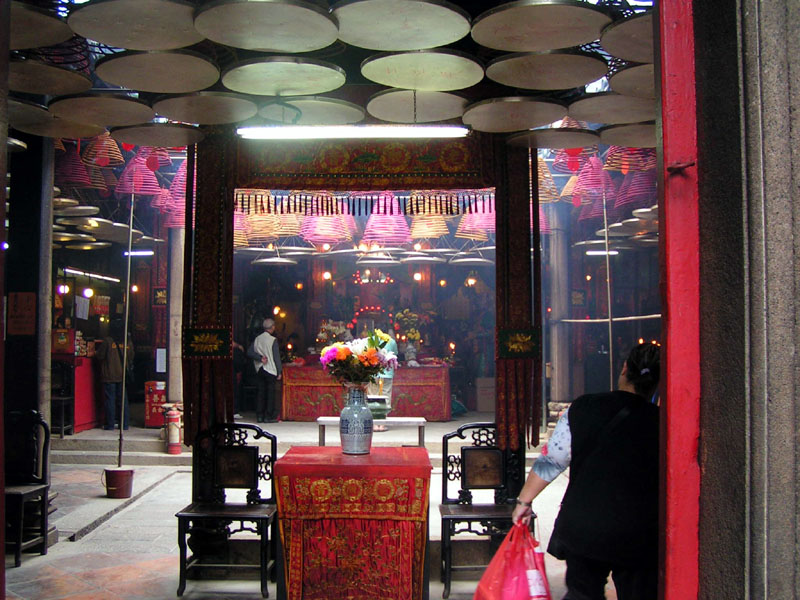
Tin Hau temple, Yung Shue Tau, Yau Ma Tei

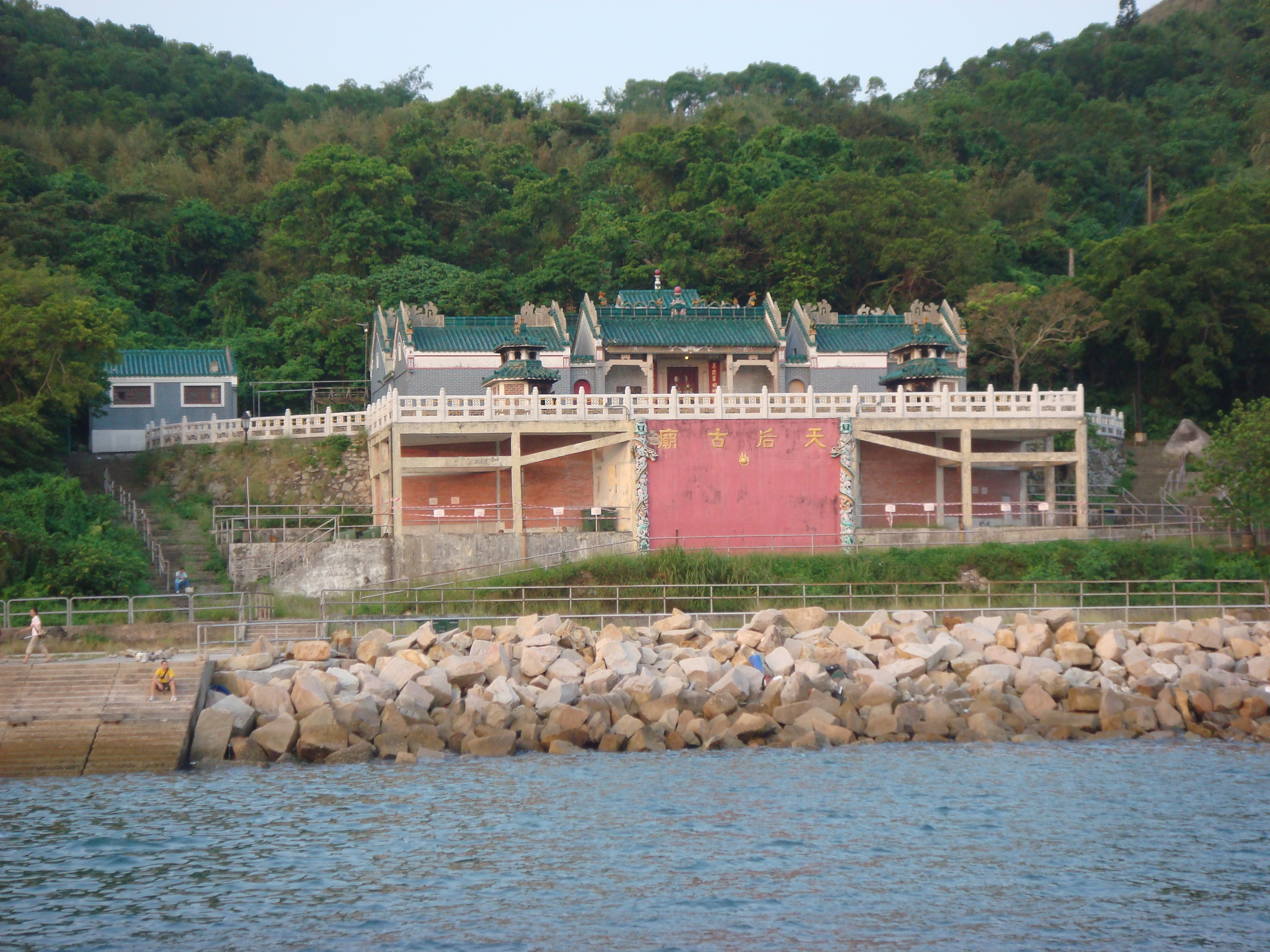
The Tin Hau Temple, Joss House Bay

Tin Hau temples in Hong Kong are dedicated to the Chinese goddess Tin Hau (天后), better known as Mazu (媽祖). Over 100 temples are dedicated (at least partially) to Tin Hau in Hong Kong. A list of these temples can be found below.

== Famous temples ==
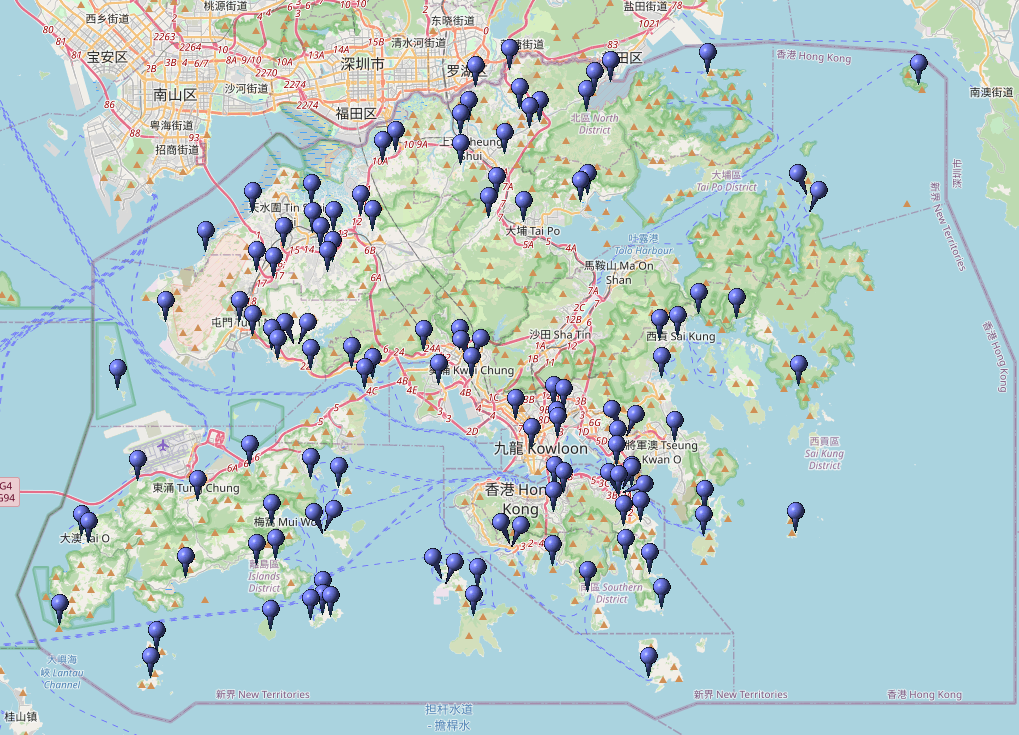
Location of Tin Hau temples in Hong Kong

Famous Tin Hau temples in Hong Kong include:

- Tin Hau temple, located at 10 Tin Hau Temple Road, Causeway Bay, east of Victoria Park, in Eastern District, on Hong Kong Island. It is a declared monument. The temple has given its name to the MTR station serving it (Island line), and subsequently to the neighboring area of Tin Hau.
- The Tin Hau temple in Yau Ma Tei is also famous in Hong Kong. The public square, Yung Shue Tau, before it is surrounded by the popular Temple Street night market.
- The Tin Hau Temple at Joss House Bay is considered the most sacred. Built in 1266, it is the oldest and the largest Tin Hau temple in Hong Kong. It is a Grade I historic building.

== Festivals ==
Two temples have a marine parade to celebrate the Tin Hau Festival (天后誕; Tiānhòudàn): Tin Hau Temple on Leung Shuen Wan (High Island) and Tin Hau Temple on Tap Mun, which has it once every ten years.

The celebration at Tin Hau Temple, Joss House Bay, is attended annually by upwards of 40,000 to 50,000 people. Another large celebration takes place at the Tai Shu Ha temple in Yuen Long District.

== Guardian gods ==
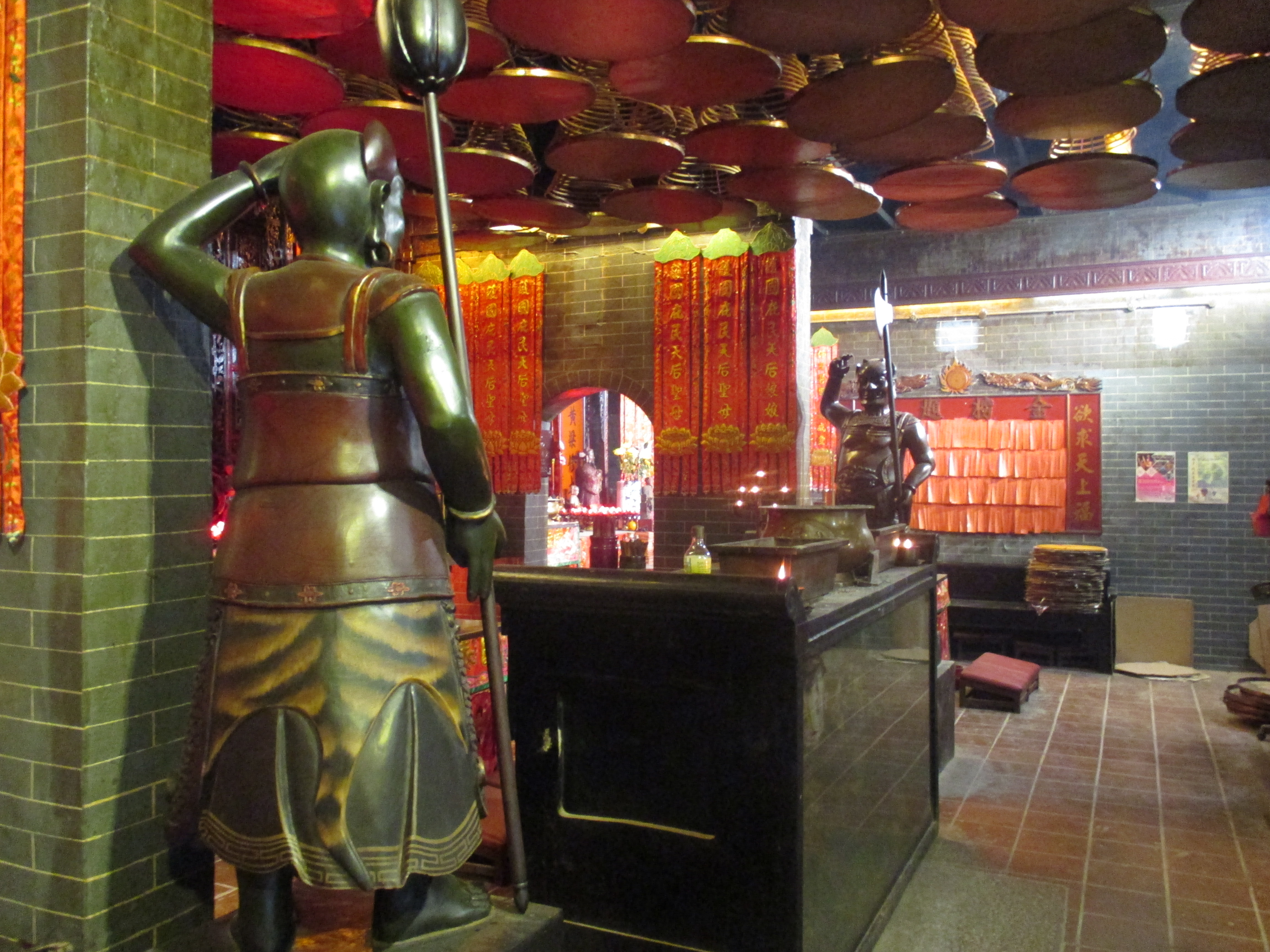
Statues of Shun Fung Yi and Chin Lei Ngan in the Shau Kei Wan Tin Hau Temple

In the larger Chinese temples, the statues of two guardian gods may be found on either side of the main altar. In the case of Tin Hau temples, such guards are always the two daemon brothers Chin Lei Ngan (千里眼; 'Thousand Li Eyes') and Shun Fung Yi (順風耳; 'With the wind ear').

== List by district ==
Note 1: Unless otherwise noted, typically in italics, Tin Hau is the main deity of the temples listed below.
Note 2: A territory-wide grade reassessment of historic buildings is ongoing. The grades listed in the table are based on these updates (8 June 2023). The temples with a "Not listed" status in the table below are not graded and do not appear in the list of historic buildings considered for grading.

=== Eastern District ===
Location	Notes	Status	References	Photographs
No. 53, Shau Kei Wan Main Street East, Shau Kei Wan 22.28005°N 114.230523°E	Shau Kei Wan Tin Hau Temple (筲箕灣天后廟) The original temple, built in 1845, was destroyed by a typhoon in 1872. A new temple was erected in-situ in 1873. Originally situated on a slope with its front part facing the sea. Renovated in 1876, 1902, 1920, 1948 and 2005. Managed by the Chinese Temples Committee. The interior of the temple can be explored with Google Street View.	Grade II		
No. 26A, A Kung Ngam Village Lane, A Kung Ngam, Shau Kei Wan 22.282224°N 114.233253°E	Yuk Wong Temple aka. Yuk Wong Kung Din (玉皇宮殿) or Yuk Wong Bo Din (玉皇寶殿) Dedicated to the Jade Emperor. Partly dedicated to Tin Hau: altar on the left side of the main altar. Managed by the Chinese Temples Committee. The interior of the temple can be explored with Google Street View.	Not listed		
On the main breakwater of Shaukeiwan Typhoon Shelter. It is only accessible by boat 22.284858°N 114.232891°E	Tin Hau Temple and Kwun Yum Temple (望海觀音古廟) Built in 2006.	Not listed		
Formerly on a small island within the former Aldrich Bay Typhoon Shelter, Shau Kei Wan 22.281277°N 114.229913°E (original location)	Hoi Shum Temple (海心廟; 'temple in the middle of the sea') Built in 1845 on nearshore rocks for the worship of Tin Hau. It was demolished in the 1980s when the Typhoon shelter was reclaimed. Some of the temple pillars and footing stones are now preserved in the Shau Kei Wan Shing Wong Temple.	Not listed Demolished		
Fei Tsui Road (翡翠道), Chai Wan 22.261195°N 114.234392°E	Chai Wan Tin Hau Temple (柴灣天后廟)	Not listed		
Off San Ha Street (新廈街), Lok Kang Po (樂耕埔), Siu Sai Wan, Chai Wan 22.263924°N 114.245608°E	Lok Kang Po Tin Hau Temple (樂耕埔天后廟) At the current location since 1967.	Not listed		

=== Islands District ===
Location	Notes	Status	References	Photographs
Near Pak She San Tsuen, Cheung Chau Wan, Cheung Chau 22.213118°N 114.027491°E	Pak She Tin Hau Temple (長洲北社天后廟) Located 100m northwest of the Pak Tai Temple. Situated within the boundary of the Chung Shak Hei Home for the Aged. The temple was probably built around 1767.	Grade II		
Chung Hing Street (Tai Shek Hau), Cheung Chau 22.204747°N 114.027131°E	Tai Shek Hau Tin Hau Temple (大石口天后宮}) Built some time before the 4th year of the Tongzhi reign (1865) of the Qing dynasty.	Grade II		
Sai Wan, Cheung Chau 22.201395°N 114.018886°E	Sai Wan Tin Hau Temple (西灣天后宮) Located west of Sai Wan (Western Bay), on the southwestern tip of the island. Built some time before 1929.	Grade III		
North of Morning Beach aka. Nam Tam Wan (南氹灣), Cheung Chau 22.203538°N 114.033151°E	Nam Tam Wan Tin Hau Temple (長洲南氹灣天后廟)	Not listed		
Pak She Street, Tung Wan, Cheung Chau 22.212382°N 114.027852°E	Yuk Hui Temple aka. Pak Tai Temple Partly dedicated to Tin Hau: altar on the right side of the main altar. Managed by the Chinese Temples Committee. The interior of the temple can be explored with Google Street View.	Grade I		
Fan Lau Miu Wan, Fan Lau, Lantau Island 22.198335°N 113.846852°E	Tin Hau Temple, Fan Lau (分流天后古廟) Built during the early Qing dynasty. Rebuilt in 1820. Repaired in 1820, 1928, 1976.	Grade III	p.112	
Yi O (二澳), Lantau Island; Unconfirmed location.	Listed with the note "no information" in "Distribution of temples on Lantau Island as recorded in 1979", in Journal of the Royal Asiatic Society Hong Kong Branch.	Not listed		
San Tsuen (新村), Tai O 22.25039°N 113.86688°E	Tai O San Tsuen Tin Hau Temple (大澳新村天后廟) aka. Yim Tin Tin Hau Temple (鹽田天后古廟) Built in 1644, in the early Qing period, repaired in 1838, 1892, 1895, 1946 and 1972.	Grade II		
Kat Hing Back Street, Tai O 22.254722°N 113.862249°E	Tin Hau Temple, Kat Hing Back Street (大澳吉慶後街天后廟) Adjacent to Kwan Tai Temple (right side). Built in 1772.	Grade III		
Sha Lo Wan, Lantau Island 22.289633°N 113.900197°E	Tin Hau Temple, Sha Lo Wan (沙螺灣天后宮) Built in 1919. Located on the left of the Ba Kong Temple, which is dedicated to Hung Shing. A wall is connecting the two temples at the front façade. (Viewed from the front, the Tin Hau Temple is on the right)	Nil grade		
Chek Lap Kok New Village (赤鱲角新村), Wong Lung Hang Road, Tung Chung, Lantau Island 22.277044°N 113.941575°E	Tin Hau Temple, Chek Lap Kok (東涌赤鱲角天后宮) aka. Tin Hau Temple, Tung Chung (東涌天后宮) Built in 1823 at the north east of Chek Lap Kok. The entire temple was built of granite quarried on the island. Repaired in 1978. Dismantled in 1991 because of the construction of the new airport, and rebuilt in 1994 at its present location.	Grade II		
Tai Ho Wan, Lantau Island 22.299136°N 113.977151°E	Tin Hau Tai Wong Temple (天后大王宮)	Not listed		
Tai Pak (大白), Lantau Island Unknown location, possibly at Discovery Bay	Listed with the note "no information" in "Distribution of temples on Lantau Island as recorded in 1979", in Journal of the Royal Asiatic Society Hong Kong Branch.	Not listed		
Nim Shue Wan, Lantau Island 22.290885°N 114.018838°E	Tin Hau Temple, Nim Shue Wan (稔樹灣村天后大宮) Built in 1920. The statue of Tin Hau was moved to Peng Chau by the villagers during the Japanese Occupation.	Nil grade	pic pic	
Luk Tei Tong, Mui Wo, Lantau Island 22.261923°N 113.992636°E	Tin Hau Temple, Luk Tei Tong (鹿地塘天后元君古廟)	Not listed		
Shap Long Chung Hau (十塱涌口), Chi Ma Wan, Lantau Island 22.239794°N 113.995264°E	Tin Hau Temple, Shap Long (十塱天后廟) It was rebuilt in 1951.	Not listed	pic pic	
Chi Ma Wan Road (along Lantau Trail Stage 12), Ham Tin Kau Tsuen (鹹田舊村), Ham Tin, Pui O, Lantau Island 22.236693°N 113.981979°E	Tin Hau Temple, Pui O (貝澳天后宮) Built in the Ming dynasty, rebuilt in 1798 and repaired in 1947, 1974 and 1995.	Not listed		
Tong Fuk, Lantau Island 22.226051°N 113.93407°E	Tin Hau Temple, Tong Fuk (塘福天后廟)	Not listed		
Shui Hau, Lantau Island 22.218593°N 113.925918°E	Tin Hau Temple, Shui Hau (水口天后宮)	Not listed		
No. 1A Yung Shue Wan Main Street, Yung Shue Wan, Lamma Island 22.224458°N 114.111198°E	Tin Hau Temple, Yung Shue Wan (南丫島榕樹灣天后古廟) Built some time before the 2nd year of Guangxu reign (1876) of the Qing dynasty. An uncommon feature of the temple is that it is guarded by two Western lions. They replaced the original Chinese lions which had been damaged in the 1960s.	Grade III		
O Tsai (澳仔), Yung Shue Wan, Lamma Island 22.227584°N 114.108915°E	Tin Hau Temple, O Tsai (澳仔天后廟)	Not listed		
Sok Kwu Wan, Lamma Island 22.203788°N 114.130933°E	Tin Hau Temple, Sok Kwu Wan (索罟灣天后宮) Probably built between 1826 and 1868.	Nil grade		
Luk Chau Village, Lamma Island 22.221034°N 114.133744°E	Tin Hau Temple, Luk Chau Village (南丫島鹿洲天后古廟) Believed to be built in the late Qing dynasty (1644–1911).	Nil grade		
Nos. 69A & 69B, Wing On Street, Peng Chau 22.28558°N 114.038389°E	Tin Hau Temple, Peng Chau (坪洲天后宮) Built in 1792. Managed by the Chinese Temples Committee. The interior of the temple can be explored with Google Street View.	Grade II		
Po Toi Island 22.164281°N 114.251195°E	Tin Hau Temple, Po Toi Island (蒲台島天后廟) Renovated in 1893.	Nil grade		
Tai A Chau, Soko Islands 22.16434°N 113.909634°E	Tin Hau Temple, Tai A Chau Built in 1828. The Tong Fuk village committee contributed to its renovation in 2000.	Not listed		
Siu A Chau, Soko Islands 22.181399°N 113.913238°E		Not listed	pic	
Hei Ling Chau 1) Former 2) Current temple: 22.25804°N 114.02858°E; 22.25631°N 114.02781°E	There are two Tin Hau temples on the island. One was built in 1925 and was converted into a store room. The current temple was built in 1985.	Not listed	Former	
Shek Kwu Chau 22.19416°N 113.991834°E		Not listed		

=== Kowloon City District ===
Location	Notes	Status	References	Photographs
Behind Lok Tai House, Lok Fu Estate, Lok Fu 22.337037°N 114.185912°E	Tin Hau Temple, Lok Fu (慈德社天后古廟 or 老虎岩(樂富)天后聖母古廟)	Not listed		
No. 49 Ha Heung Road, To Kwa Wan 22.3172°N 114.188957°E	Tin Hau Temple, To Kwa Wan (土瓜灣天后廟) Built in 1885. The temple also houses the statue of Lung Mo, which was transferred here in 1964, when the temple at Hoi Sham Island was demolished following land reclamation. Managed by the Chinese Temples Committee. The interior of the temple can be explored with Google Street View.	Grade III		
1/F, 40 Pak Tai Street, To Kwa Wan 22.321101°N 114.188413°E	Building demolished as of 2016. Wah Kwong Tak Yan Tong (華光得因堂). Located in a residential and commercial building. Partly dedicated to Tin Hau.	Not listed	Picture: site of the former building.	

=== Kwai Tsing District ===
Location	Notes	Status	References	Photographs
Chung Mei Lo Uk Village, Tsing Yi Island 22.350567°N 114.107156°E	Tin Hau Temple, Tsing Yi (青衣天后古廟) The Tin Hau Festival in Tsing Yi lasts from 1st to 5th day of the 4th lunar month each year. The temple was originally located near Tsing Yi Tong. Upon reclamation of Tsing Yi, it was moved to Ha Ko Tan (下高灘), near today's Chung Mei Lo Uk Village.	Not listed		
Near Ha Kwai Chung Tsuen (下葵涌村), Kwai Chung. Located across Kwai Chung Road from Kwai Fong Terrace. 22.355434°N 114.12941°E	Tin Hau Temple, Kwai Chung (葵涌天后廟) Built prior to 1828, the original temple was relocated to the present site in 1966 to make way for the port reclamation in Kwai Chung.	Nil grade		
Opposite to Chui Kwai House, Kwai Chung Estate, Tai Wo Hau Road, Tai Wo Hau 22.366914°N 114.129168°E	Tin Hau Temple, Tai Wo Hau (大窩口天后廟)	Not listed		
Near Yan Kwai House, Kwai Chung Estate, Tai Wo Hau 22.366006°N 114.128444°E	Kwai Chung Fu Tak Temple (葵涌福德堂) Partly dedicated to Tin Hau.	Not listed		

=== Kwun Tong District ===
Location	Notes	Status	References	Photographs
Ma Wan Tsuen (馬環村), Lei Yue Mun (Kowloon) 22.286262°N 114.239814°E	Tin Hau Temple, Lei Yue Mun (鯉魚門天后廟) First built in 1753, it was completely reconstructed in 1953.	Grade III		
Cha Kwo Ling Road, Cha Kwo Ling 22.299552°N 114.22959°E	Tin Hau Temple, Cha Kwo Ling (茶果嶺天后廟) Initially built in Cha Kwo Ling Village during the Qing dynasty, it was moved to Cha Kwo Ling Road in 1941, and was under maintenance and repair in 1947. Opened officially in 1948. Managed by the Chinese Temples Committee. The interior of the temple can be explored with Google Street View.	Grade III		
Rehab Path, off Lei Yue Mun Road. On a hill between Kwun Tong and Lam Tin 22.308698°N 114.229928°E	Tin Hau Temple and Sam Shan Kwok Wong Temple, Kwun Tong (三山國王古廟 (觀塘), 觀塘復康徑三山國王廟, 茜草灣三山國王古廟)	Not listed		
Po Lam Road, near the junction with Sau Mau Ping Road, Sau Mau Ping. Near Po Tat Estate. 22.318522°N 114.235437°E	Hoi Kwok Tin Hau Shing Mo Temple (海國天后聖母廟) The opening ceremony took place on 24 November 2012.	Not listed		
Sau Mau Ping Road, Sau Mau Ping. 22.321582°N 114.232213°E	Hoi Kwok Tin Hau Temple (海國天后古廟) Part of a complex built in 1964 without government approval. Demolished in 2008 to make way for the new On Tat Estate.	Not listed	picture picture	

=== North District ===
Location	Notes	Status	References	Photographs
No. 41 Hung Kiu San Tsuen (紅橋新村), Sheung Shui 22.517983°N 114.127425°E	Tin Hau Temple, Hung Kiu San Tsuen (紅橋新村天后廟) Built for the worship of Tin Hau, protecting the ships which sailed along Ng Tung River, linked to Starling Inlet. It was rebuilt in 1962.	Nil grade		
Wai Loi Tsuen, Sheung Shui Wai, Sheung Shui Item #221 on map: 22.509569°N 114.122302°E	Completely renovated to modern structure.	Not listed		
Ping Kong, Sheung Shui 22.490327°N 114.122151°E	Tin Hau Temple, Ping Kong (上水丙岡村天后宮) Within a walled village. The temple is featured in Jackie Chan's 1983 film Project A.	Not listed		
Lung Yeuk Tau, Fanling 22.497503°N 114.152691°E	Tin Hau Temple, Lung Yeuk Tau (粉嶺龍躍頭天后宮) Located along the Lung Yeuk Tau Heritage Trail, next to Tang Chung Ling Ancestral Hall.	Declared		
Ho Pa Tsuen (河壩村), between Hung Leng and Kan Tau Tsuen, Fanling 22.513816°N 114.169381°E	Tin Hau Temple, Ho Pa Tsuen (河壩村天后廟)	Not listed	picture picture	
No. 72 Ping Che, Ta Kwu Ling 22.526207°N 114.162476°E	Ping Yuen Tin Hau Temple (坪源天后古廟) Probably built in 1756. The temple is flanked by two buildings: the Ping Yuen Community Hall (right) and the Sing Ping She Memorial Hall (left).	Grade III		
Muk Wu Tsuen, Ta Kwu Ling 22.539976°N 114.132738°E	Tin Hau Temple, Muk Wu (木湖村天后廟) Built around 1912–1913.	Grade III		
Ta Kwu Ling San Tsuen (打鼓嶺新村), Ta Kwu Ling 22.54061°N 114.14748°E	Tin Hau Temple, Ta Kwu Ling San Tsuen (打鼓嶺新村天后廟)	Not listed		
Chuk Yuen (竹園), Ta Kwu Ling 22.545226°N 114.154799°E		Not listed		
Tsung Yuen Ha (松園下), Ta Kwu Ling 22.55062°N 114.15556°E	Tin Hau Temple, Tsung Yuen Ha (松園下天后廟)	Not listed	picture picture	
Nga Yiu (瓦窰), Ta Kwu Ling 22.54139°N 114.13718°E		Not listed		
Wu Shek Kok, Sha Tau Kok 22.536334°N 114.214491°E	Tin Hau Temple, Wu Shek Kok (烏石角天后宮) Adjacent to a Hip Tin temple. Rebuilt in the 1960s.	Not listed		
Southwest of Tam Shui Hang, Sha Tau Kok 22.544222°N 114.221368°E	Tin Hau Temple, Tam Shui Hang (担水坑天后宮) aka. Sam Wo Association Tin Hau Temple (沙頭角三和堂天后宮)	Not listed		
Yim Liu Ha, Sha Tau Kok 22.543249°N 114.22514°E	Tin Hau Temple, Yim Liu Ha (鹽寮下村天后廟) Rebuilt in the 1990s.	Not listed		
Off Luk Keng Road, Nam Chung 22.52454°N 114.2088°E	Nam Chung Tin Hau Temple (南涌天后宮) Part of the Tin Hau Temple Complex, Nam Chung. The temple complex contains also a Kwun Yam Temple and a Dragon King shrine.	Not listed		
Sai Ho (西澳), Kat O Island 22.54796°N 114.291648°E	Tin Hau Temple, Kat O (吉澳天后宮) Probably built in 1763.	Grade III		

=== Sai Kung District ===
Location	Notes	Status	References	Photographs
Joss House Bay (大廟灣; Tai Miu Wan) 22.270603°N 114.289899°E	Tin Hau Temple, Joss House Bay (佛堂門天后古廟) Managed by the Chinese Temples Committee. The interior of the temple can be explored with Google Street View.	Declared		
Tin Chau Road, Tin Ha Wan Village (田下灣村), Hang Hau 22.314279°N 114.26926°E	Tin Hau Temple, Hang Hau (坑口天后廟) Built around 1840.	Grade III		
Leung Shuen Wan Chau (High Island), Sai Kung District 22.349959°N 114.354103°E	Tin Hau Temple, Leung Shuen Wan (糧船灣天后廟) Probably built in 1741. It is located in the original coastal site and is feng shui-oriented.	Grade III		
Po Tung Road (普通道), Sai Kung Town 22.381071°N 114.270866°E	Tin Hau Temple and Hip Tin Temple (西貢墟天后古廟及協天宮) Built in the 1910s–1920s.	Grade II		
Off Tai Mong Tsai Road, Wong Keng Tei (黃麖地), Pak Tam Chung, Sai Kung Peninsula 22.392931°N 114.31192°E	Wong Keng Tei Tin Hau Temple (黃麖地天后古廟) aka. Tsam Chuk Wan Tin Hau Temple (斬竹灣天后廟)	Not listed		
Off Tai Mong Tsai Road, Tso Wo Hang, Sai Kung Peninsula 22.395954°N 114.28567°E	Tin Hau Temple, Tso Wo Hang (早禾坑天后古廟)	Not listed		
Pak Kong, Sai Kung Peninsula 22.379668°N 114.258751°E	Built before 1872. The temple is located on a feng shui marking the eastern edge of the residential area of the village.	Not listed		
Nam Wai, Hebe Haven area 22.355117°N 114.259979°E	Tin Hau Temple, Nam Wai (南圍天后古廟)	Not listed		
South Ninepin Island (Ninepin Group) 22.256566°N 114.352242°E		Not listed	picture Note: located at the top of the hill at the centre of the picture =>	
Nam Tong (南堂), Tung Lung Chau 22.254963°N 114.289307°E	Hung Shing Temple, Tung Lung Chau A Hung Shing Temple. Partly dedicated to Tin Hau. Built before 1931. Kwun Yam and Tin Hau are housed at the altars of the left and right chambers respectively. A large rock, called Holy Rock (聖石) by the worshippers, is protruding from the rear wall of the right chamber.	Nil grade		

=== Sha Tin District ===
Location	Notes	Status	References	Photographs
Ma On Shan Tsuen 22.41054°N 114.23345°E	Tin Hau Shing Mo Temple (天后聖母廟)	Not listed		
Ma On Shan Tsuen 22.40979°N 114.23425°E	Tin Hau Temple (天后古媽廟)	Not listed		

=== Sham Shui Po District ===
Location	Notes	Status	References	Photographs
No.180-184 Yee Kuk Street (醫局街), at the corner of Kweilin Street, Sham Shui Po 22.328435°N 114.159761°E	Tin Hau Temple, Sham Shui Po (深水埗天后廟) Erected in 1901. Managed by the Chinese Temples Committee. The interior of the temple can be explored with Google Street View.	Grade III		

=== Southern District ===
Location	Notes	Status	References	Photographs
No. 182 Aberdeen Main Road, Aberdeen 22.249677°N 114.15576°E	Tin Hau Temple, Aberdeen (石排灣天后廟) Built in 1851. Managed by the Chinese Temples Committee. The interior of the temple can be explored with Google Street View.	Grade III		
South of Yuk Fai House (旭暉閣), Yue Fai Court, Aberdeen 22.247980°N 114.156521°E	Tin Hau Temple (香港仔龜齡天后宮) Built around 1955.	Not listed		
Middle Island 22.235669°N 114.185649°E	Recorded in 1981. Destroyed by Typhoon Hato on August 23, 2017.	Not listed		
Stanley Plaza, Stanley Main Street, Stanley 22.21899°N 114.209321°E	Tin Hau Temple, Stanley (赤柱天后廟) Built in 1767. Managed by Stanley Kai-fong Welfare Association Ltd. by delegation from the Chinese Temples Committee.	Nil grade		
No. 219 Lan Nai Wan Village, Shek O 22.23972°N 114.235394°E	Lin Hok Sin Koon (蓮鶴仙觀) Partly dedicated to Tin Hau.	Not listed		
No. 333 Shek O Village, Shek O 22.230536°N 114.252115°E	Tin Hau Temple, Shek O (石澳天后廟) Believed to be built before 1891.	Grade III		
Hok Tsui (鶴咀) 22.20786°N 114.2604°E		Not listed	picture picture	

=== Tai Po District ===
Location	Notes	Status	References	Photographs
No. 39 Ting Kok Road, Tai Po Kau Hui 22.454343°N 114.165713°E	Tin Hau Temple, Tai Po Kau Hui (大埔舊墟天后宮) Built in 1691. On the left of the Tin Hau Temple is Hip Tin Temple dedicated to Kwan Tai. On its right was Tam Sin Temple (譚仙宮) where Tam Kung was revered. The Tam Sin Temple was converted into a Shui Yuet Temple (水月宮) dedicated to Guanyin in the mid-2010s.	Grade III		
Tsz Tong Tsuen (祠堂村), Tai Hang, Tai Po 22.469592°N 114.146677°E	Tin Hau Temple and Man Tai Temple (天后宮及文帝古廟) The Tin Hau Temple is adjacent to a Man Tai Temple. Built in 1727 and 1884 respectively.	Nil grade		
Fong Ma Po, Lam Tsuen 22.456963°N 114.141641°E	Tin Hau Temple, Fong Ma Po Near the Lam Tsuen Wishing Trees. Believed to be built in 1768 or around 1771. The temple was damaged by Typhoon Dot in 1964 and by a fire in 1965. It was extensively renovated in 1967.	Grade II		
Wai Tau Tsuen, Lam Tsuen 22.46226°N 114.14791°E	Roadside shrine dedicated to Tin Hau.	Not listed		
North of Ha Tei Ha. Shuen Wan area of Plover Cove, Tai Po District. 22.46702°N 114.204264°E	One of the three temples of the Shuen Wan Temples complex (船灣三宮廟). The other ones are a Hip Tin Temple, dedicated to Kwan Tai (Guan Yu), and a Temple of Confucius. The Sam Kung Temples complex had been destroyed by a typhoon in 1936 and was reconstructed in 2009.	Not listed		
Po Sam Pai (布心排) 22.471146°N 114.209671°E (unconfirmed location)		Not listed	picture	
Ko Lau Wan, North Sai Kung Peninsula 22.460414°N 114.361195°E	Tin Hau Temple, Ko Lau Wan	Not listed		
Ha Wai (下圍), Tap Mun Chau 22.47137°N 114.359876°E	Tin Hau Temple, Tap Mun (塔門天后古廟) The temple complex comprises three temples in two buildings: the first building is a Tin Hau Temple, built in 1737, to which an annex was later added, housing a Kwan Tai Temple. On its left, Shui Yuet Kung, built in 1788, is dedicated to Kwun Yam and the Earth God.	Grade II		
Port Island 22.500739°N 114.356857°E	Tin Hau Temple, Port Island (赤州天后廟)	Not listed		
Sha Tau (沙頭), Ping Chau 22.541289°N 114.436646°E	Tin Hau Temple, Sha Tau, Tung Ping Chau Built in 1765. Two other deities are worshipped at its side altars: Hung Shing and Tai Sui.	Grade III		

=== Tsuen Wan District ===
Location	Notes	Status	References	Photographs
Wai Tsuen Road, Tsuen Wan Town. Situated at the east of Luk Yeung Sun Chuen, next to Block J. 22.373177°N 114.121395°E	Tin Hau Temple, Tsuen Wan (荃灣天后宮) Built in 1721 during the reign of Kangxi (1661–1722) of the Qing dynasty.	Grade II		
Yau Kom Tau Village, Po Fung Road, Tsuen Wan 22.372577°N 114.096839°E	Tin Hau Temple, Yau Kom Tau (油柑頭天后宮) Yau Kom Tau Village was established in 1864. It was resited to the present location in 1984, following the development of the MTR. The temple is a single storey stone house. It lies by the side of the Yau Kom Tau Village Rural Committee, on a terrace built by boulders.	Not listed		
Dragon Beach (青龍灣), off Castle Peak Road, Tsing Lung Tau 22.361633°N 114.050124°E	Tin Hau Temple	Not listed		
Nos. 56–58 Castle Peak Road, Tsing Lung Tau 22.361385°N 114.047358°E	Tin Hau Temple, Tsing Lung Tau (青龍頭天后宮) Built before 1889.	Nil grade		
No. 38 Ma Wan Main Street, Ma Wan 22.34855°N 114.056426°E	Tin Hau Temple, Kap Shui Mun, Ma Wan It was renovated in 1860.	Grade III		
Western coast of Ma Wan, southwest of Ma Wan Main Street Village South (馬灣大街村南) 22.350274°N 114.057001°E	Tin Hau Temple, Ma Wan (馬湾天后古廟) Built in 2022.	Not listed		
Pak Wan (北灣), Ma Wan 22.354422°N 114.061914°E	Tin Hau Temple, Pak Wan, Ma Wan Recently rebuilt. Said to have been originally built by the local pirate Cheung Po Tsai.	Not listed	original	

=== Tuen Mun District ===
Location	Notes	Status	References	Photographs
Tsing Chuen Wai, Lam Tei 22.422776°N 113.982873°E	Tin Hau Temple, Tsing Chuen Wai	Not listed		
Tsing Chuen Wai, Lam Tei 22.422807°N 113.982331°E	Shrine of Tsing Chuen Wai Village shrine of a walled village. Tin Hau, Kwan Tai and a Qing official are worshipped in the village shrine.	Not listed		
Adjacent to Fuk Hang Tsuen Village Office, Fuk Hang Tsuen (福亨村), Lam Tei 22.41651°N 113.98855°E	Fuk Hang Tsuen Tin Hau Temple (福亨村天后宮)	Not listed		
Fuk Hang Tsuen Path (福亨村徑), Fuk Hang Tsuen (福亨村), Lam Tei 22.418459°N 113.994104°E	Fuk Hang Tsuen Path Tin Hau Temple (福亨村徑天后宮) The temple was built in 1958, renovated in 1983, and rebuilt in 2015.	Not listed		
Tin Hau Road, Tuen Mun 22.39061°N 113.970545°E	Hau Kok Tin Hau Temple (后角天后廟 or 口角天后古廟). The temple stands by the Tuen Mun River Channel. Subsequent to reclamation, the temple is now enclosed by factories.	Nil grade		
Castle Peak Road, opposite Sam Shing Estate, Sam Shing Hui, Tuen Mun 22.381634°N 113.979173°E	Castle Peak Sam Chau Ma Temple (青山三洲媽廟)	Not listed		
Along Castle Peak Road, near Hong Kong Gold Coast 22.373226°N 113.992214°E	Tin Hau Temple, So Kwun Tan (屯門掃管灘天后廟)	Not listed		
Yu Chui Street, So Kwun Tan 22.366462°N 113.996653°E	Tin Hau Temple, Siu Sau Tsuen (小秀村天后廟)	Not listed		
So Kwun Wat Tsuen Road, So Kwun Wat Tsuen 22.376862°N 114.007449°E	Tin Hau Temple, So Kwun Wat (掃管笏天后古廟)	Not listed		
No. 21 So Kwun Wat San Tsuen (掃管笏新村) 22.376815°N 114.010372°E		Not listed		
Tai Lam Kok (大欖角), Tai Lam Chung. Located across Castle Peak Road from the Maritime Services Training Institute. 22.360293°N 114.019165°E	Tin Hau Temple, Tai Lam Kok (屯門大欖角天后古廟) Built in 1924, it underwent a major renovation in 1955. It was then demolished and reconstructed on the same site in 2006–2007.	Nil grade		
At Eastern White Tiger Pass (東白虎坳) aka. Ma Neung Au (媽娘坳; 'Ma Neung Pass', after the temple), along Yuen Tsuen Ancient Trail 22.404278°N 114.042497°E	Ma Neung Temple (Tin Hau Temple) (媽娘廟 (天后廟)) The statue of Tin Hau is enshrined in the center of the altar. The statues of other deities are placed on its right and left side. The temple is part of a set of three temples built by villagers at the north of today's Tai Lam Chung Reservoir, on the main routes to Tin Fu Tsai, Tai Hang Village (大坑村) and Kan Uk Tei with a will that their trips to the markets would be safe. The other two temples are a Kwan Tai Temple and Pak Kung Temple (伯公廟) aka. White Tiger Pass Temple (白虎坳廟).	Not listed		
Pak Long (北朗), Lung Kwu Tan 22.390843°N 113.919602°E		Not listed		
Sha Chau 22.347885°N 113.886873°E	Tin Hau Temple, Sha Chau Probably built in 1846. Rebuilt in 1998.	Nil grade		

=== Wan Chai District ===
Location	Notes	Status	References	Photographs
No. 10, Tin Hau Temple Road, Causeway Bay 22.282187°N 114.19276°E	Tin Hau Temple, Causeway Bay (銅鑼灣天后廟)	Declared		
No. 9, Blue Pool Road, at the intersection with Ventris Road, Wong Nai Chung (Happy Valley) 22.270018°N 114.185977°E	Tin Hau Temple, Happy Valley (黃泥涌天后宮) The Tam Kung Temple, together with the Tin Hau Temple at the back, was relocated from the former Wong Nai Chung Village to the present site in 1901 to pave way for the redevelopment of Happy Valley. Managed by the Chinese Temples Committee. The temple complex can be explored with Google Street View.	Nil grade		
Moored at the Causeway Bay Typhoon Shelter 22.286218°N 114.186575°E	Floating Tin Hau Temple (水上三角天后廟) It had been docked in the Causeway Bay Typhoon Shelter since 1955. A new temple was built on land, following land reclamation.	Not listed		
On the shore of Causeway Bay Typhoon Shelter 22.285304°N 114.19006°E	Triangular Island Goddess of Tin Hau Shrine of Peace (水上三角天后廟) Temple built on land, replacing the Floating Tin Hau Temple, following land reclamation.	Not listed		

=== Wong Tai Sin District ===
Location	Notes	Status	References	Photographs
Nga Tsin Wai Tsuen 22.335005°N 114.193179°E	Tin Hau Temple, Nga Tsin Wai Tsuen (衙前圍村天后廟) Village shrine of a walled village. Built before 1732.	Grade III		

=== Yau Tsim Mong District ===
Location	Notes	Status	References	Photographs
Temple Street, Yau Ma Tei 22.309954°N 114.170686°E	Tin Hau Temple Complex, Yau Ma Tei The complex comprises a row of five adjacent temples: a Tin Hau Temple, a Shing Wong Temple, a Kwun Yum temple, Shea Tan and Hsu Yuen. The Shea Tan and Hsu Yuen housed study halls, active until 1955. Managed by Tung Wah Group of Hospitals by delegation from the Chinese Temples Committee.	Declared		

=== Yuen Long District ===
Location	Notes	Status	References	Photographs
Off Tai Shu Ha Road, Tai Kei Leng/Nga Yiu Tau, Shap Pat Heung 22.428747°N 114.034301°E	Called the Tai Shu Ha Tin Hau Temple (大樹下天后廟), it got its name from being a Tin Hau Temple under a tree. Probably built in 1786. The celebration taking place there for the Birthday of Tin Hau is one of the biggest in the city.	Grade II		
Wang Tat Road, Fung Chi Tsuen, Wang Chau 22.44736°N 114.02082°E	Tin Hau Temple, Fung Chi Tsuen (鳳池村天后宮) Constructed before 1908.	Grade I		
Tung Tau Tsuen, Yuen Long Kau Hui 22.447705°N 114.034711°E	Tin Hau Temple, Tung Tau Tsuen It is connected with the Kwun Yum Temple at the back, and they are considered as one complex.	Grade III		
Off Deep Bay Road, Sha Kong Tsuen (沙江村), Lau Fau Shan 22.460184°N 113.979054°E	Tin Hau Temple, Sha Kong Tsuen (沙江天后廟) Originally built in the 1800s.	Grade III		
Wing Ping Tsuen, San Tin 22.498594°N 114.077656°E	Tung Shan Temple (東山古廟) Dedicated to Tin Hau. It underwent a renovation in 1894. It is the village alliance temple of all the Man (文) in San Tin.	Grade III		
Ma On Kong, Pat Heung 22.41214°N 114.06342°E	Tin Hau Temple, Ma On Kong (馬鞍崗天后廟)	Not listed		
Ng Uk Tsuen, Wang Chau 22.464831°N 114.019565°E	Tin Hau Temple, Tai Tseng Wai (大井圍天后古廟, 大井天后古廟) Built in 1688. Rebuilt in 1981. The temple is shared by the three villages of Tai Tseng Wai, Ng Uk Tsuen and Shing Uk Tsuen.	Not listed		
Nam Hang Pai (南坑排), Shap Pat Heung, off Tai Tong Road 22.422392°N 114.031037°E	Tin Hau Temple, Nam Hang Pai (元朗南坑排天后宮) Located along Yuen Tsuen Ancient Trail.	Not listed		
Off Nim Wan Road (稔灣路), Ha Pak Nai 22.435193°N 113.94725°E	Kwun Yam Tin Hau Temple (觀音天后廟)	Not listed		
Fung Kat Heung Road, Fung Kat Heung, Kam Tin 22.458002°N 114.05346°E	Tin Hau Temple, Fung Kat Heung (逢吉鄉天后宮)	Not listed		
No.62 Shui Mei Tsuen, Kam Tin 22.44853°N 114.061523°E	Tin Hau Temple, Shui Mei Tsuen (水尾村天后古廟) It was built in 1745 and renovated in 1936 and 1968.	Grade III		
On top of a hill, off Hung Ting Road (洪天路), Hung Shui Kiu 22.437622°N 114.00047°E	Tin Hau Temple, Hung Shui Kiu (洪水橋天后廟)	Not listed		
Mai Po Lung Tsuen, San Tin 22.492093°N 114.068409°E	Located next to Shek Wu Wai Heroes Temple (米埔隴 英雄古廟)	Not listed		
Ma Tin Pok (馬田壆) 22.437618°N 114.026358°E	Tin Hau Temple, Ma Tin Pok (元朗馬田壆村天后宮)	Not listed		

== See also ==
- Chinese Temples Committee
- Hip Tin temples in Hong Kong
- Kwan Tai temples in Hong Kong
- List of Mazu temples around the world
- Places of worship in Hong Kong
- Qianliyan & Shunfeng'er
