= San Tau Kok =

Village in Tai Po District, Hong Kong

Coordinates: 22.46939°N 114.208018°E

San Tau Kok 䃟頭角
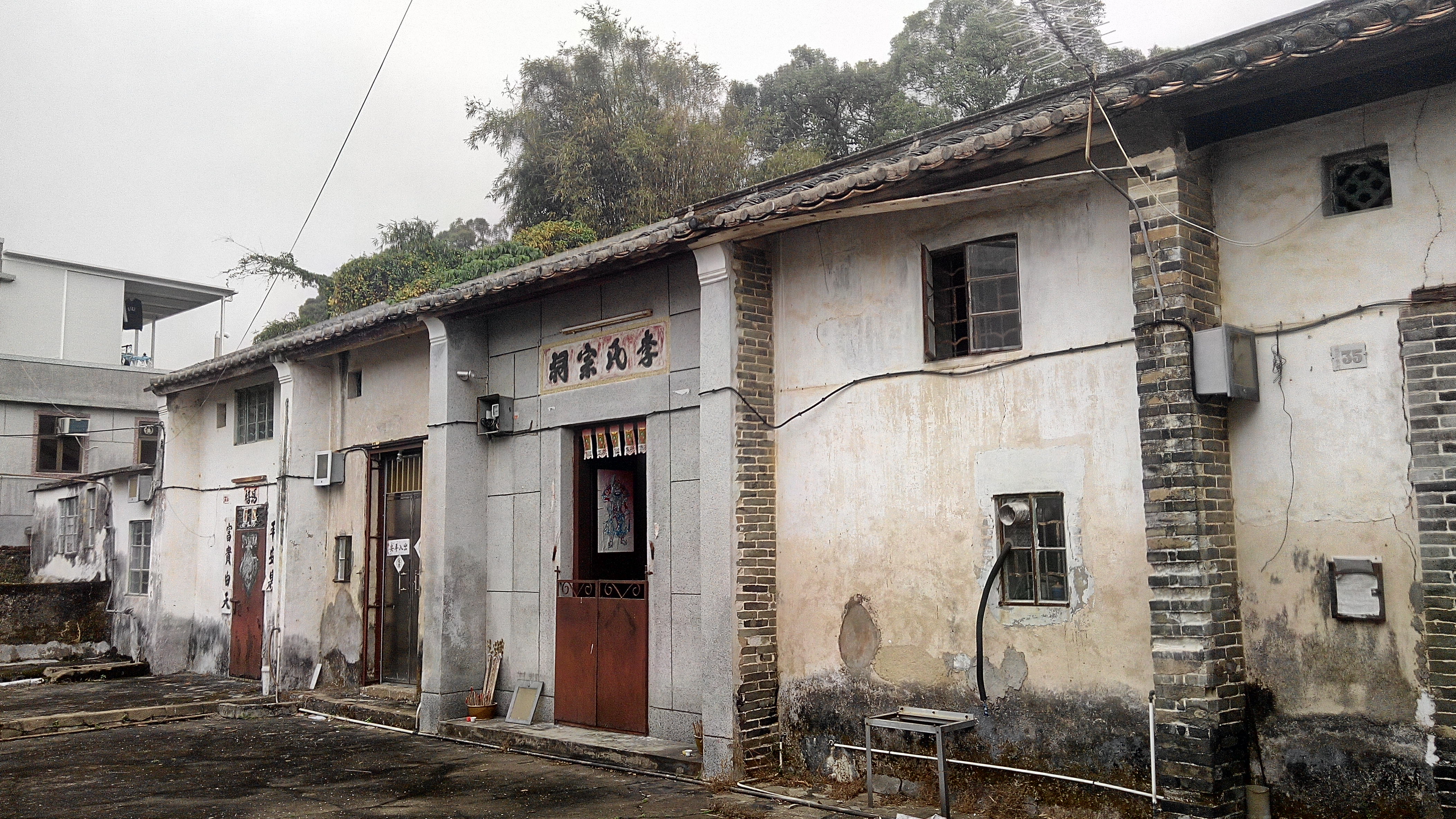
- Lee Ancestral Hall in San Tau Kok
- Interactive map of San Tau Kok
- Region: Hong Kong
- Area: New Territories
- District: Tai Po

San Tau Kok
- Traditional Chinese: 䃟頭角
Transcriptions
Yue: Cantonese
- Yale Romanization: Saan tàuh gok
- Jyutping: Saan3 tau5 gok3

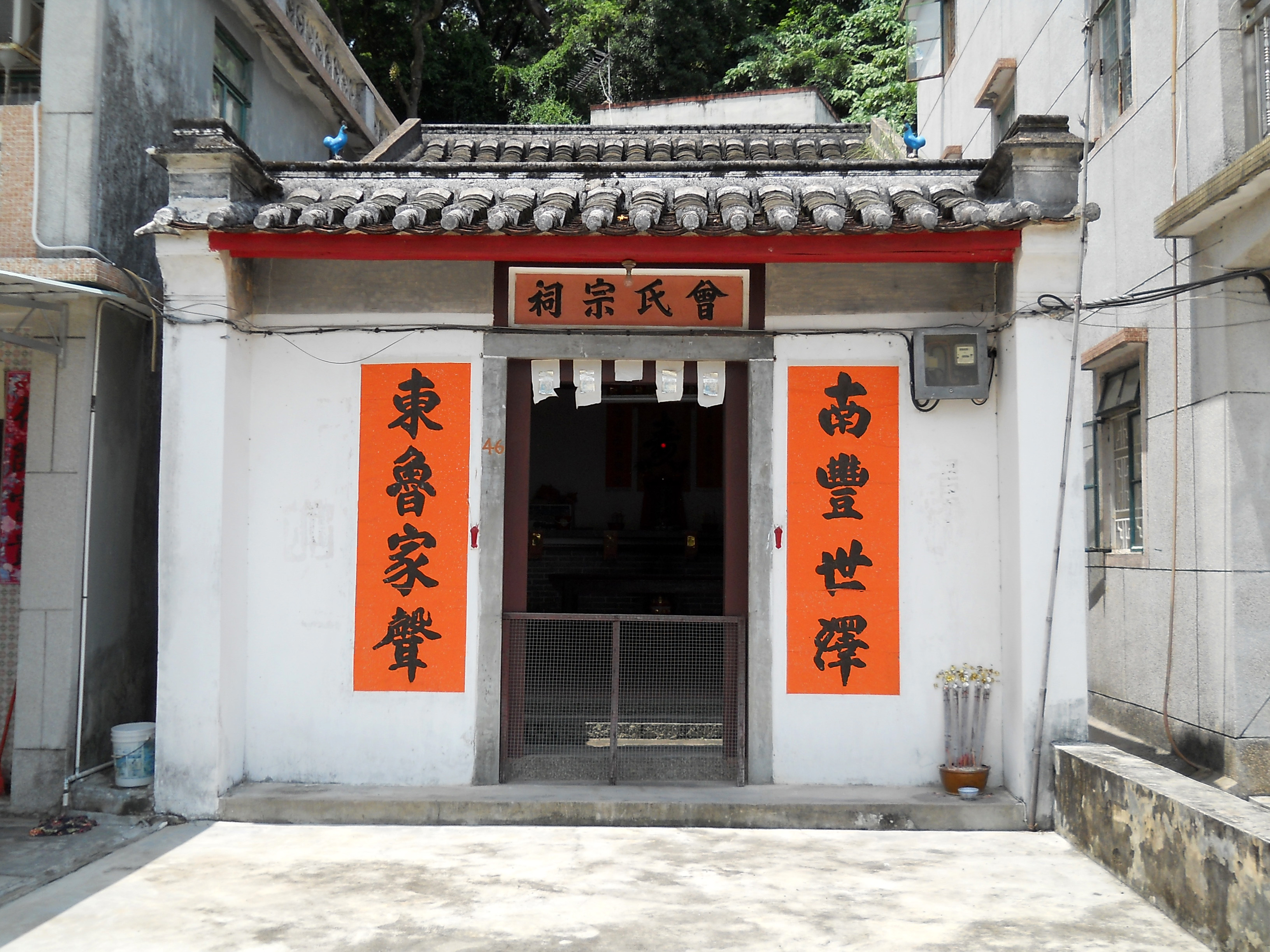
Tsang Ancestral Hall in San Tau Kok.

San Tau Kok is a Hakka village in Plover Cove, Tai Po, Hong Kong.

== History ==
The village was settled by the Sung (宋), Tsang (曾), Chan (陳) and Lee (李) clans. The inhabitants of the village were traditionally farmers and fisherfolk.

== Administration ==
San Tau Kok is one of the villages represented within the Tai Po Rural Committee. For electoral purposes, San Tau Kok is part of the Shuen Wan constituency, which was formerly represented by So Tat-leung until October 2021.

San Tau Kok is a recognized village under the New Territories Small House Policy.

== See also ==
- Plover Cove
