= Sha Lan Tsuen =

Village in Hong Kong

Coordinates: 22.460578°N 114.207509°E

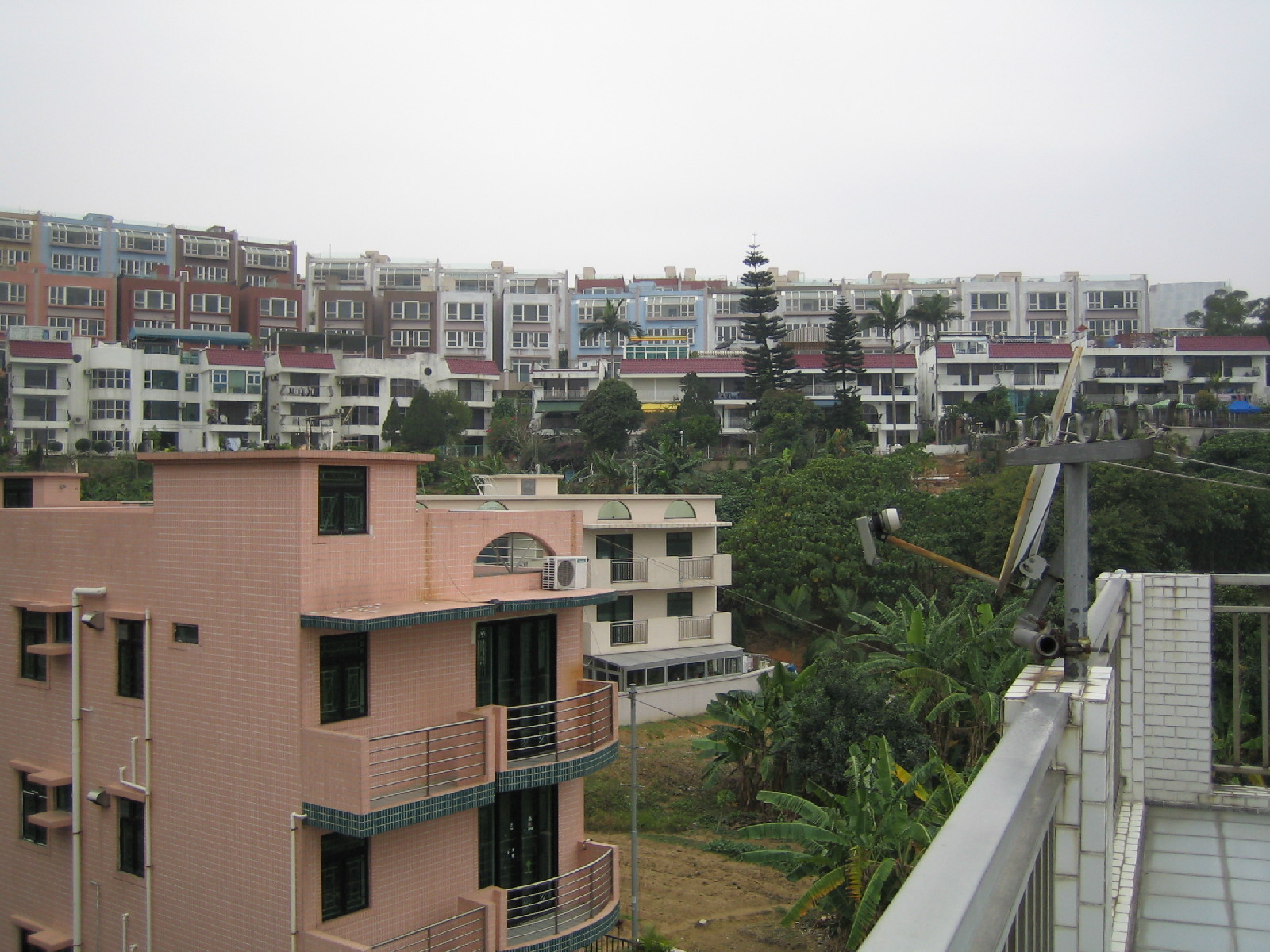
Sha Lan Tsuen. The upper range of buildings belong to the Beverly Hills private housing estate.

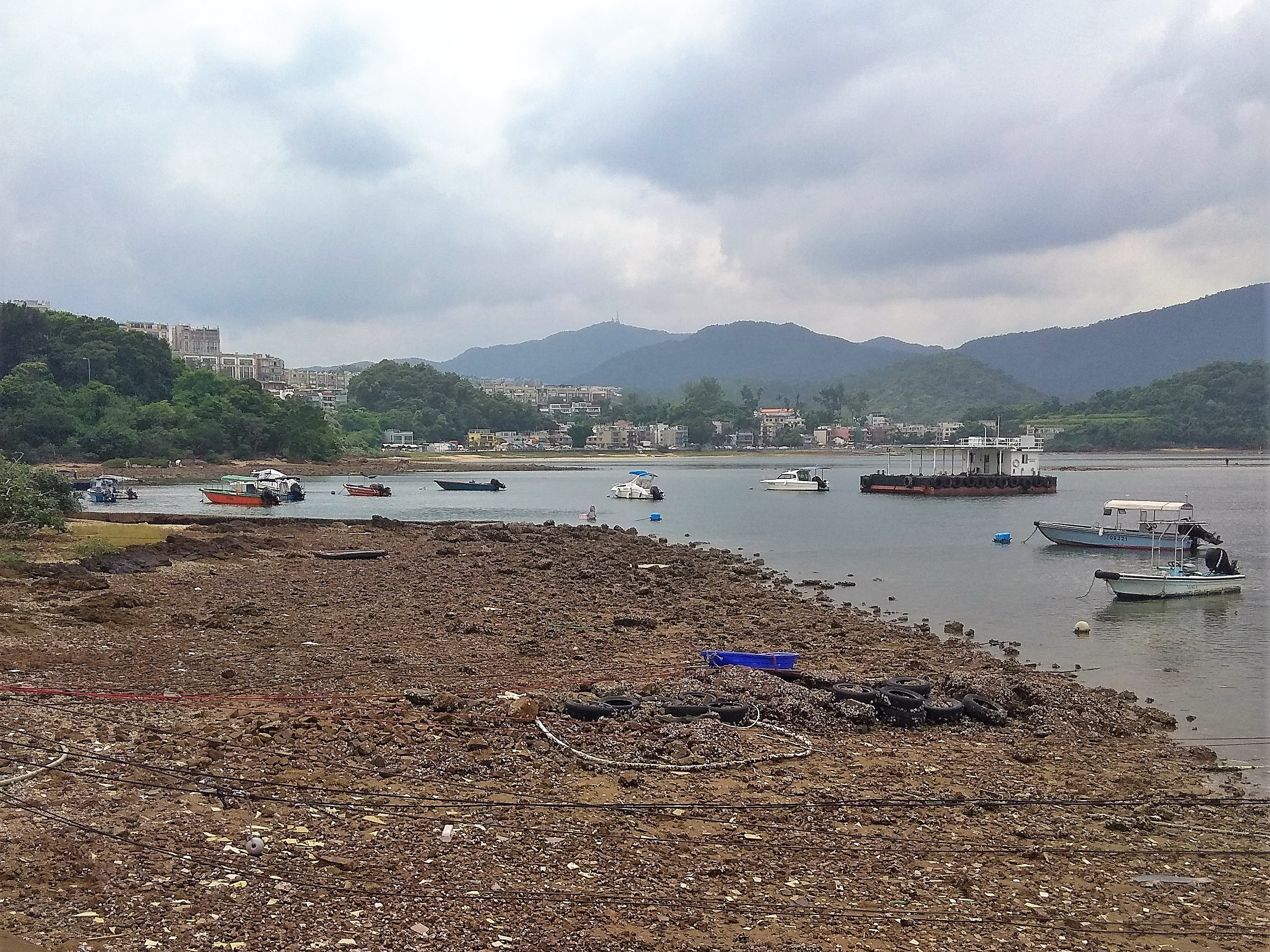
View of Luen Yick Pier. The Beverly Hills (left), Shuen Wan Sha Lan (centre) and Shuen Wan Chan Uk (right).

Sha Lan Tsuen (Chinese: 沙欄村) or Shuen Wan Sha Lan (船灣沙欄) is a small village in Hong Kong, to the east of the Tai Po New Town. This village mainly comprises the Lee (李) family of the Hakka origin and they have been living there for more than a century.

The village is based along the coastline of the New Territories district of Hong Kong and has a small beach.

== Administration ==
Sha Lan Tsuen is one of the villages represented within the Tai Po Rural Committee. For electoral purposes, Sha Lan Tsuen is part of the Shuen Wan constituency, which was formerly represented by So Tat-leung until October 2021.

Shuen Wan Sha Lan is a recognized village under the New Territories Small House Policy.

== Development ==
This rural village of Hong Kong has seen the construction of new flats and new roads. The area to which Sha Lan Tsuen belongs, Shuen Wan (船灣), has attracted many real estate companies to build luxury flats that spans right across the whole area. One such projects is "The Beverly Hills" estate owned by the Henderson Land Development Group. The luxury flats cost more than HK$10,000,000. Although socially upgrading the area, it has somewhat spoilt the natural landscape and overcrowded the whole area, according to local people living in the village.
