= Shuen Wan Chim Uk =

Coordinates: 22.464056°N 114.207096°E

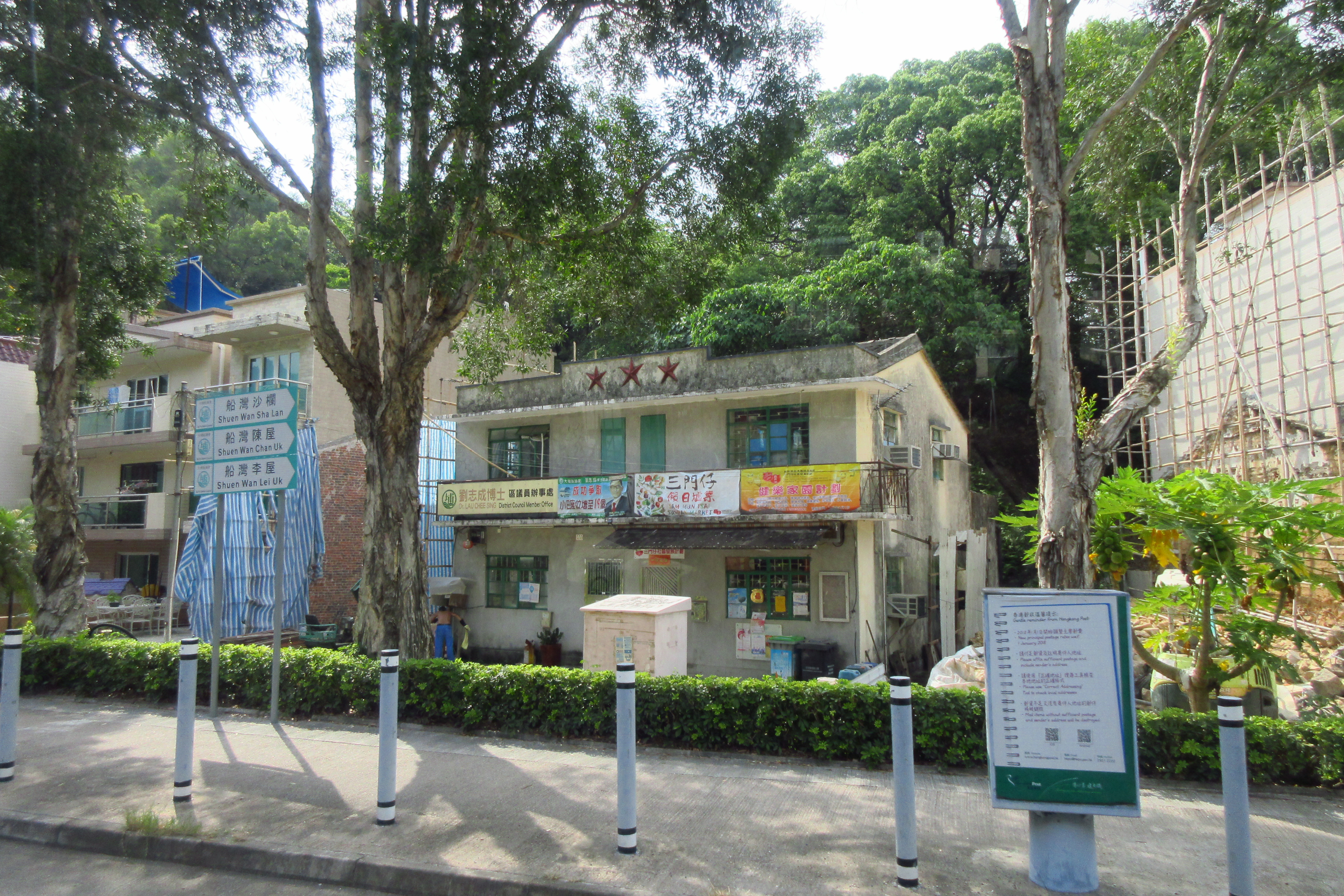
Shuen Wan Chim Uk viewed from Ting Kok Road.

Shuen Wan Chim Uk (Chinese: 船灣詹屋) is a village in Tai Po District, Hong Kong.

== Administration ==
Shuen Wan Chim Uk is one of the villages represented within the Tai Po Rural Committee. For electoral purposes, Shuen Wan Chim Uk is part of the Shuen Wan constituency, which was formerly represented by So Tat-leung until October 2021.

Shuen Wan Chim Uk is a recognized village under the New Territories Small House Policy.

== See also ==
- Plover Cove
