= Wong Yue Tan =

Village in Hong Kong

Coordinates: 22.462161°N 114.20359°E

Wong Yue Tan (Chinese: 黃魚灘) is a village in Tai Po District, Hong Kong.

== Administration ==
Wong Yue Tan is a recognized village under the New Territories Small House Policy. It is one of the villages represented within the Tai Po Rural Committee. For electoral purposes, Wong Yue Tan is part of the Shuen Wan constituency, which was formerly represented by So Tat-leung until October 2021.

== See also ==
- Plover Cove
