= Wai Ha =

Coordinates: 22.469257°N 114.20286°E

Wai Ha (Chinese: 圍下) or Shuen Wan Wai Ha (Chinese: 船灣圍下) is a village in Tai Po District, Hong Kong.

== Administration ==
Wai Ha is one of the villages represented within the Tai Po Rural Committee. For electoral purposes, Wai Ha is part of the Shuen Wan constituency, which was formerly represented by So Tat-leung until October 2021.

Shuen Wan Wai Ha is a recognized village under the New Territories Small House Policy.

== See also ==
- Plover Cove
