= Shuen Wan Lei Uk =

Coordinates: 22.46283°N 114.207212°E

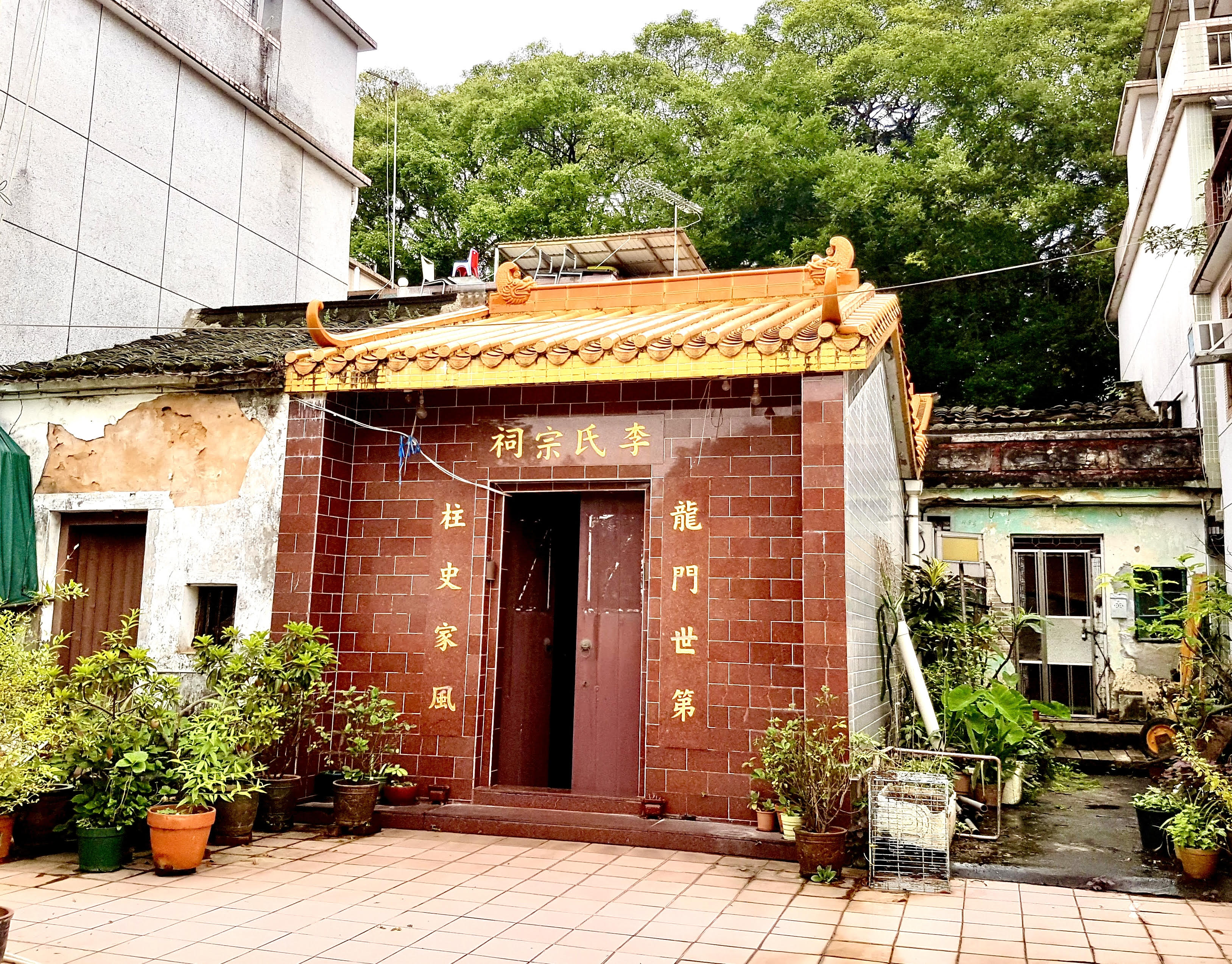
Li Ancestral Hall in Shuen Wan Lei Uk.

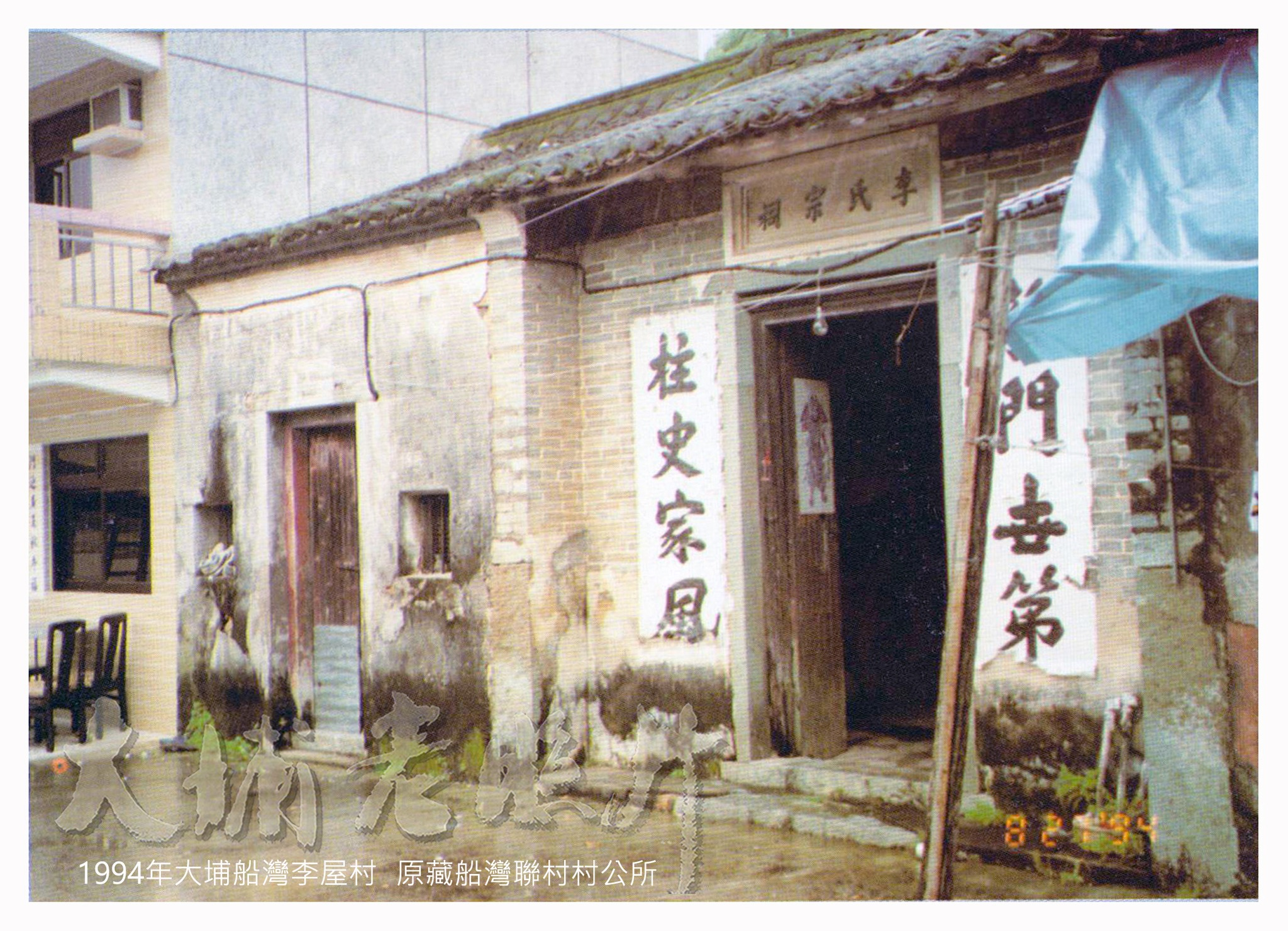
Li Ancestral Hall in Shuen Wan Lei Uk in 1994.

Shuen Wan Lei Uk (Chinese: 船灣李屋) is a village in Tai Po District, Hong Kong.

== Administration ==
Shuen Wan Lei Uk is one of the villages represented within the Tai Po Rural Committee. For electoral purposes, Shuen Wan Lei Uk is part of the Shuen Wan constituency, which was formerly represented by So Tat-leung until October 2021.

Shuen Wan Lei Uk is a recognized village under the New Territories Small House Policy.

== See also ==
- Plover Cove
