= Tso Wo Hang =

Coordinates: 22.394435°N 114.289385°E

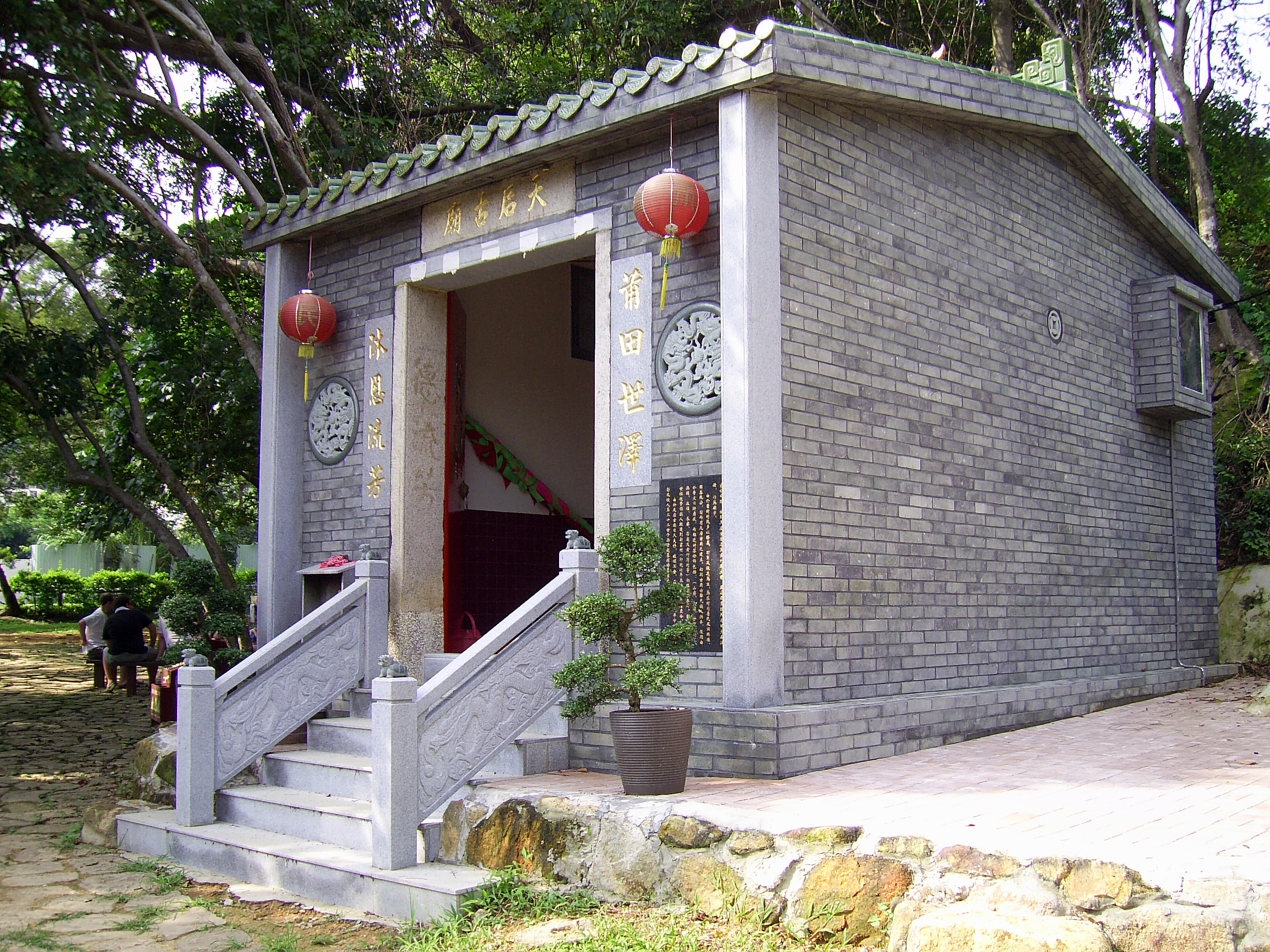
Tin Hau Temple in Tso Wo Hang.

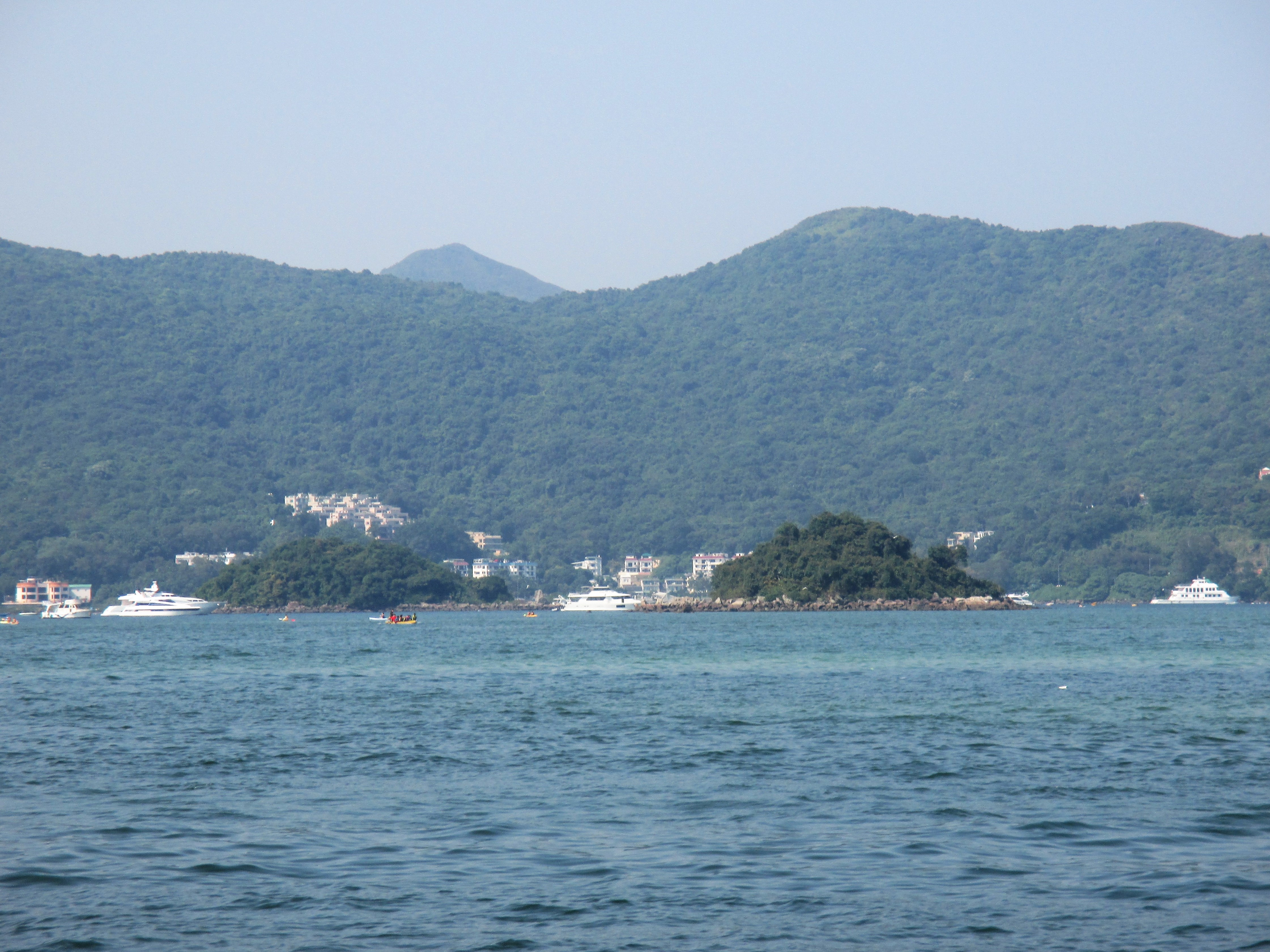
Distant view of Tso Wo Hang near the shore of Inner Port Shelter. The two islets are Tai Chau (left) and Lap Sap Chau (right).

Tso Wo Hang (Chinese: 早禾坑) is a village in Sai Kung District, Hong Kong.

== Administration ==
Tso Wo Hang is a recognized village under the New Territories Small House Policy.
