= Fuk Hang Tsuen =

Village in Lam Tei, Tuen Mun District

Coordinates: 22.41783°N 113.98937°E

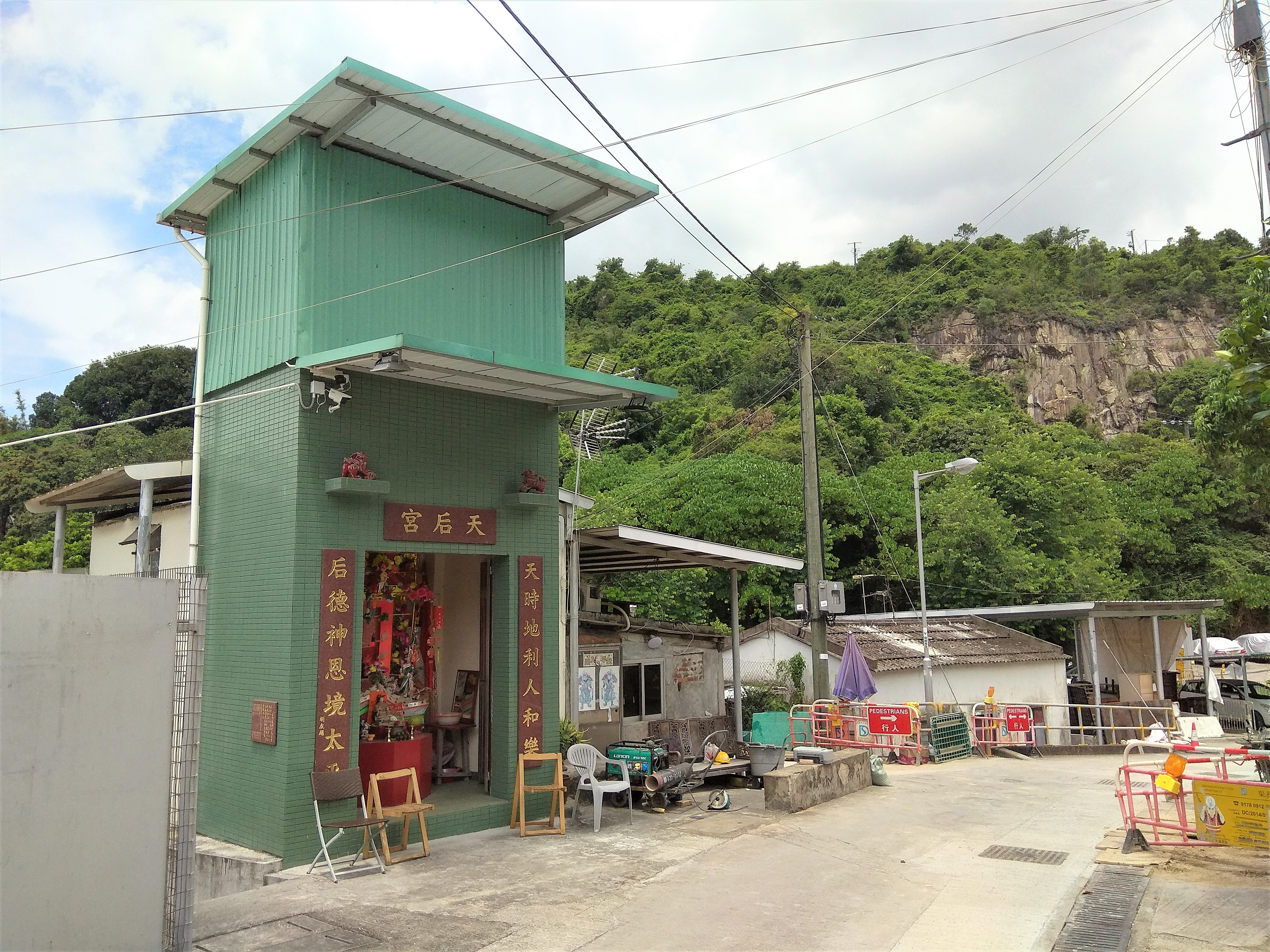
Tin Hau Temple in Fuk Hang Tsuen.

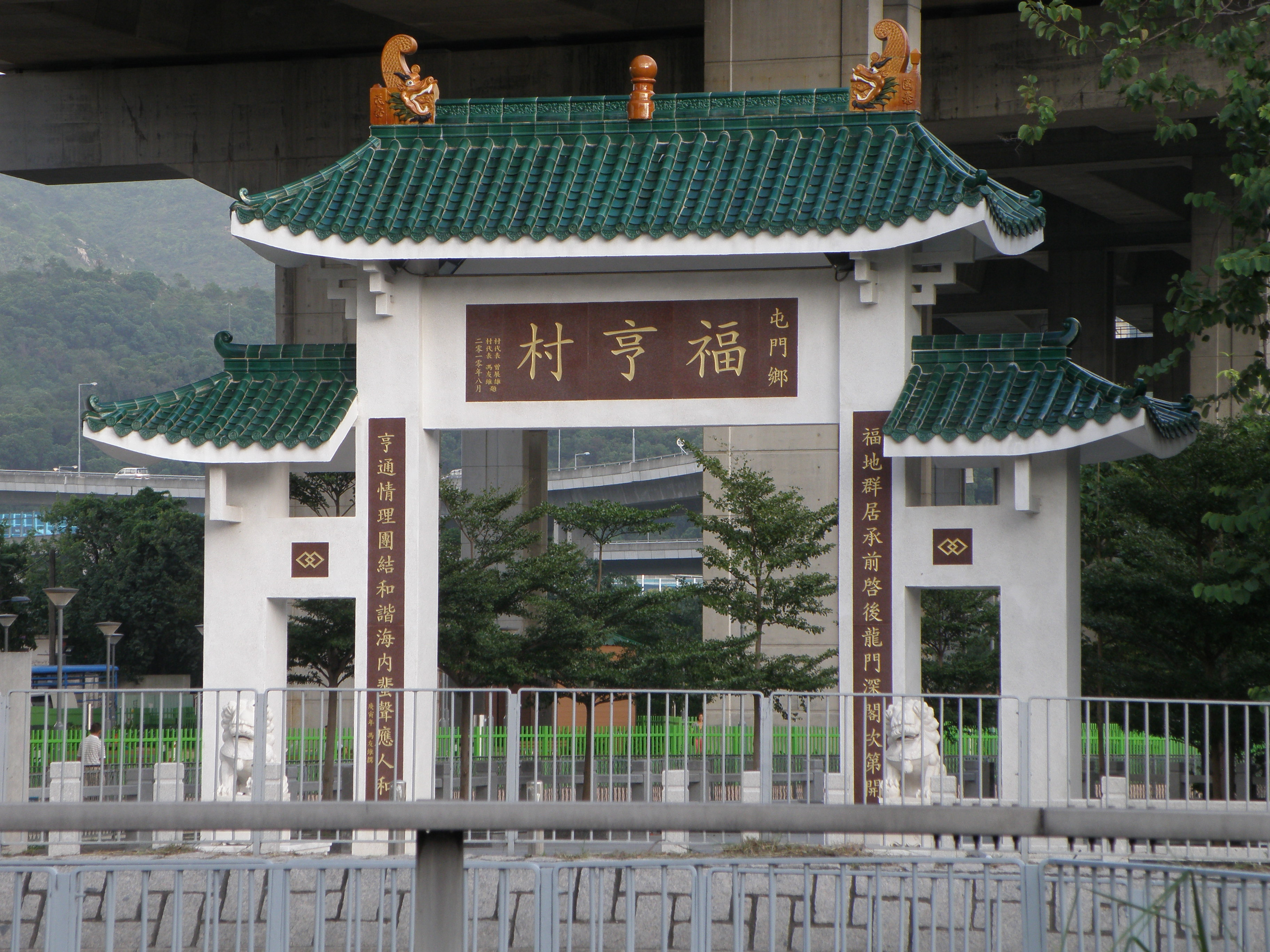
Fuk Hang Tsuen village gate along Castle Peak Road - Lam Tei.

Fuk Hang Tsuen (Chinese: 福亨村) is a village in Lam Tei, Tuen Mun District, Hong Kong.

== Administration ==
Fuk Hang Tsuen contains Fuk Hang Tsuen (Lower) and Fuk Hang Tsuen (Upper), two of the 36 villages represented within the Tuen Mun Rural Committee. For electoral purposes, Fuk Hang Tsuen is part of the Fu Tai constituency.
