= Hau Kok Tin Hau Temple =

Coordinates: 22.39061°N 113.970545°E

- Traditional Chinese: 后角天后廟
- Simplified Chinese: 后角天后庙
Transcriptions
Standard Mandarin
- Hanyu Pinyin: Hòu Jiǎo Tiānhòu Miào
Yue: Cantonese
- Jyutping: hau6 gok3 tin1 hau6 miu6*2

Alternative Chinese name
- Traditional Chinese: 口角天后古廟
- Simplified Chinese: 口角天后古庙
Transcriptions
Standard Mandarin
- Hanyu Pinyin: Kǒujiǎo Tiānhòu Gǔ Miào
Yue: Cantonese
- Jyutping: hau2 gok3 tin1 hau6 gu2 miu6*2

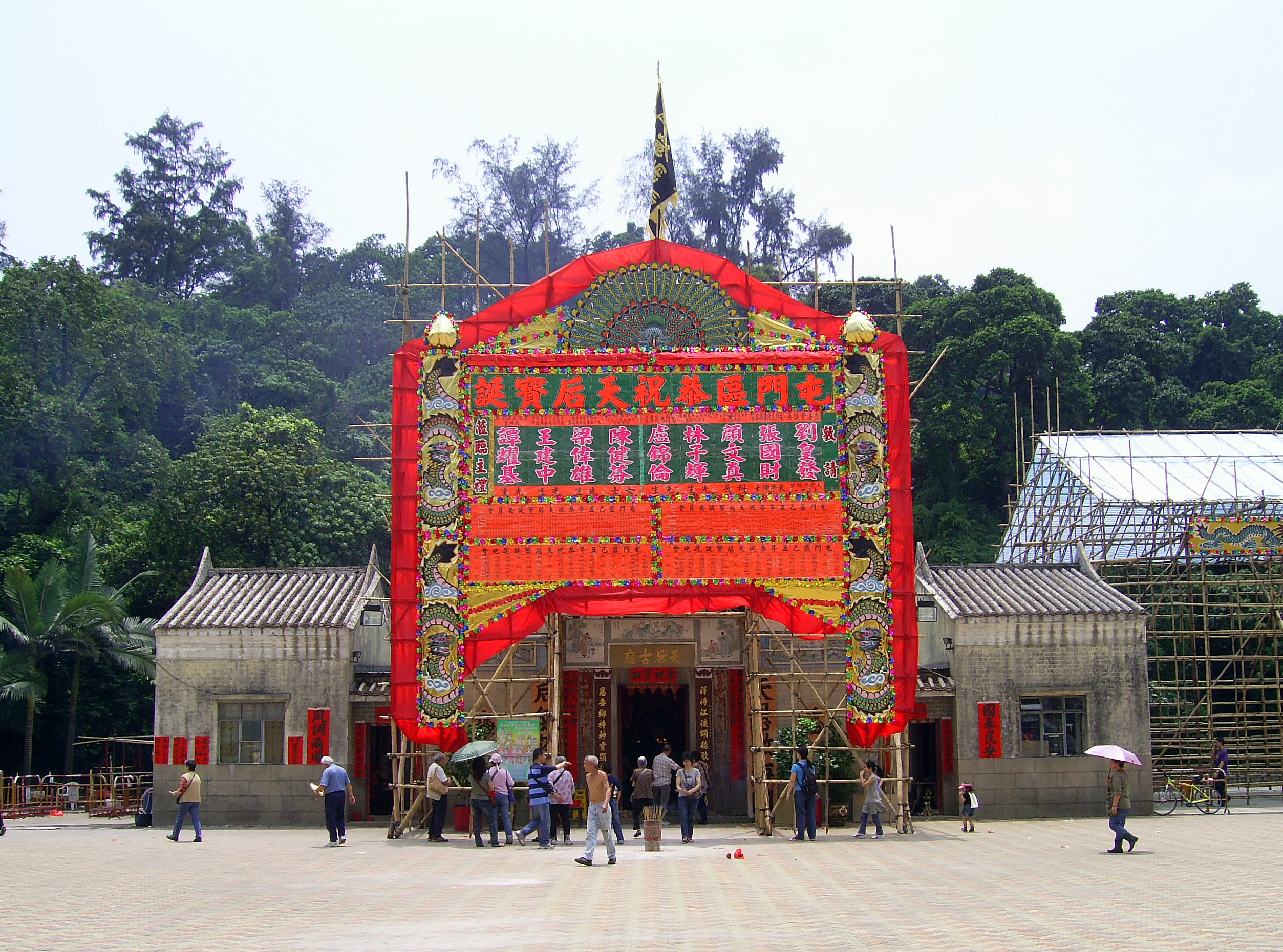
Hau Kok Tin Hau Temple

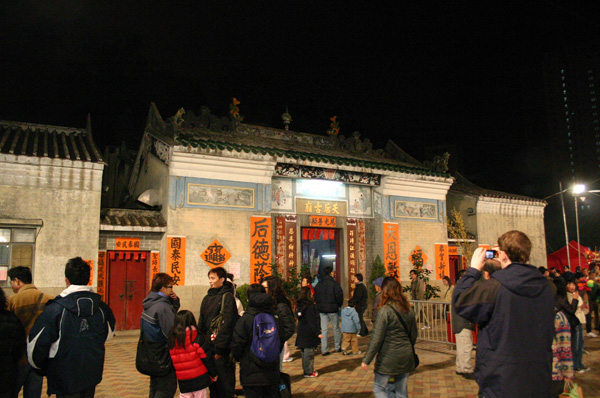
Hau Kok Tin Hau Temple

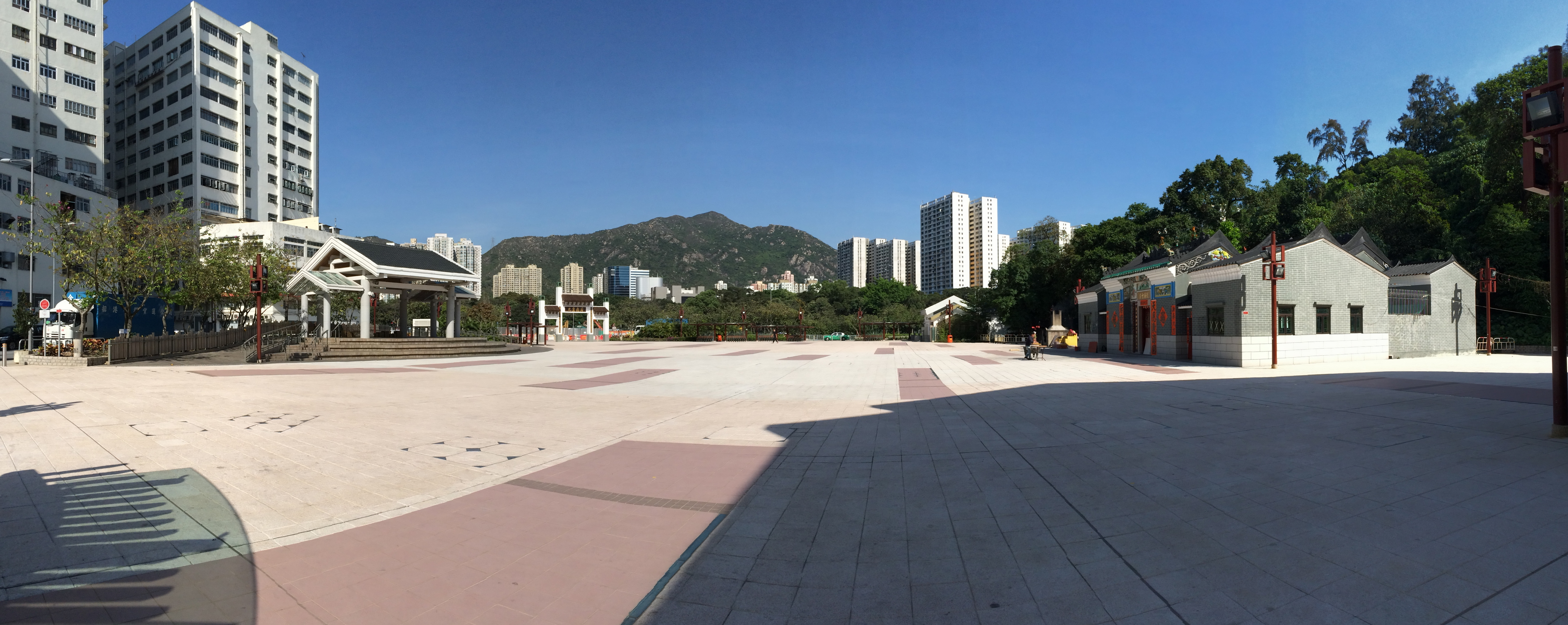
Tin Hau Temple Square.

Hau Kok Tin Hau Temple (Chinese: 后角天后廟 or 口角天后古廟; 'Tin Hau Temple Point') is a Tin Hau temple in Tuen Mun, Hong Kong.

== Location ==
The temple stands by the Tuen Mun River Channel. It is located next to Tin Hau Road in Tuen Mun, within a short distance from the Tuen Mun station of the West Rail line. Initially built at the seashore and facing the sea, the temple is now inland and surrounded by factories since the 1970 and 1980s as a consequence of land reclamation.

== History ==
Being a hub of waterway transport, Tuen Mun attracted fishermen communities in the ancient times. The fishermen wished to enjoy the protection and blessings of the Heavenly Empress, Goddess Tin Hau (Mazu) and built a temple at Hau Kok in Tuen Mun Kau Hui (Tuen Mun Old Market) in 1637 to worship her and pray for safety. During the Ming Dynasty, the To (陶) clansmen, who were engaged in the salt business, migrated to Tuen Mun. They developed close ties with local fishermen and worked together for the expansion of the Temple. People living in the walled villages also helped in financing its renovation on a number of occasions. The temple was rebuilt in 1989.

== Activities ==
The Temple has always been well patronized by worshippers. During the Tin Hau Festival (on the 23rd day of the third month in the Chinese calendar) every year, villagers and fishermen hold a series of celebrations in the open space in front of the Temple. They pray for prosperity and peace by staging thanksgiving opera performances as well as dragon and lion dances. Every year, Lunar New Year fair will be organized in the square in front of Tin Hau Temple. Besides, it is also a place for earthen pot gathering.

== Transport ==
Walk along Pui To Road at Exit A of Tuen Mun station (West Rail line) towards Tin Hau Road. The journey takes about 5 minutes. One may take LRT route No. 610, 615 or 615P and alight at Tsing Shan Tsuen stop. One may also take bus route No. 66M at Tsuen Wan station or No. 66X at Olympic station.

== See also ==
- Tin Hau temples in Hong Kong
- Tin Hau Temple, Joss House Bay
- Tin Hau Temple, Causeway Bay
- Tin Hau Temple, Yau Ma Tei
