= Ha Tei Ha =

Village in Tai Po District, Hong Kong

Coordinates: 22.465139°N 114.20377°E

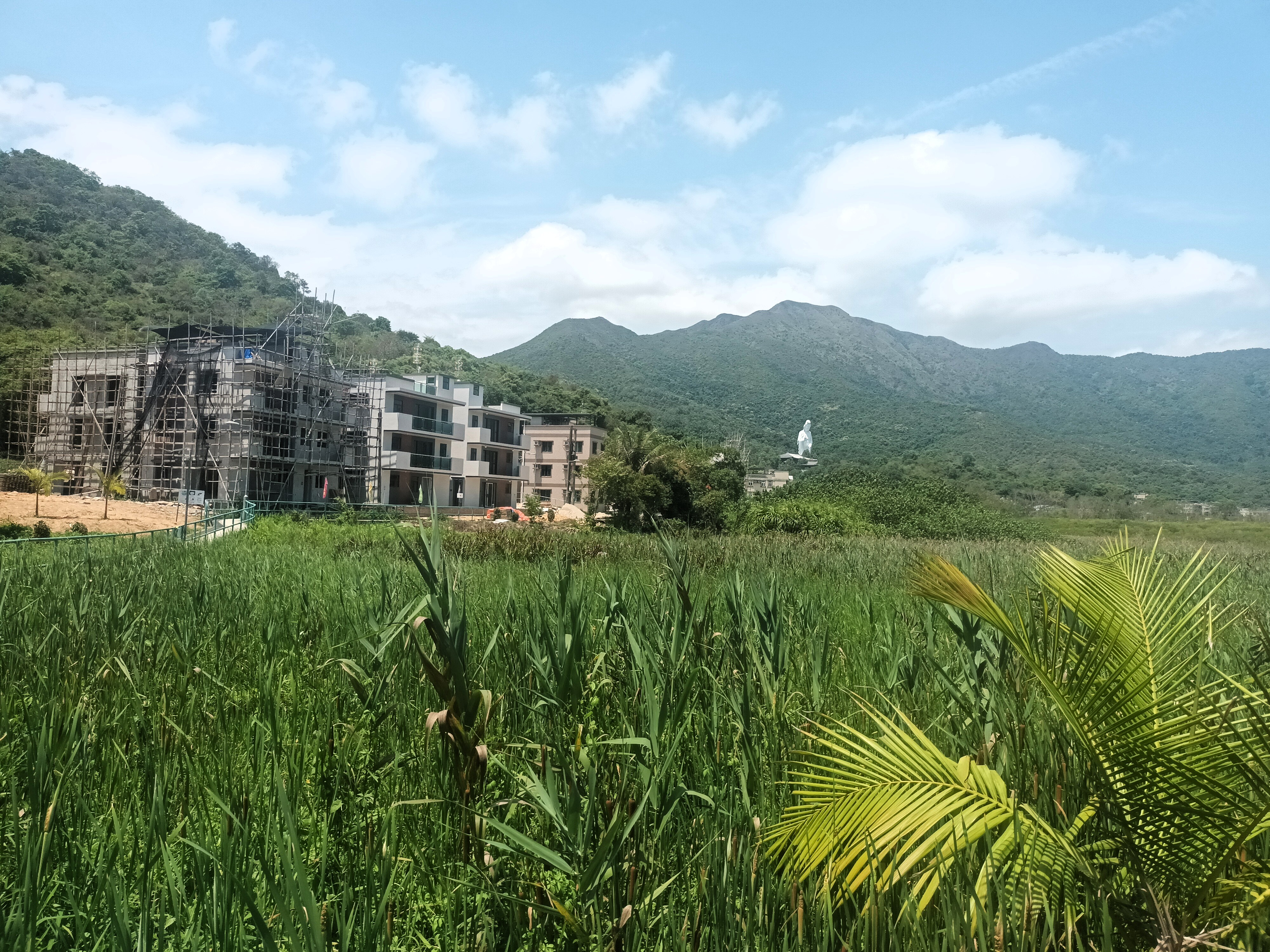
View of Ha Tei Ha with Tsz Shan Monastery in the distance

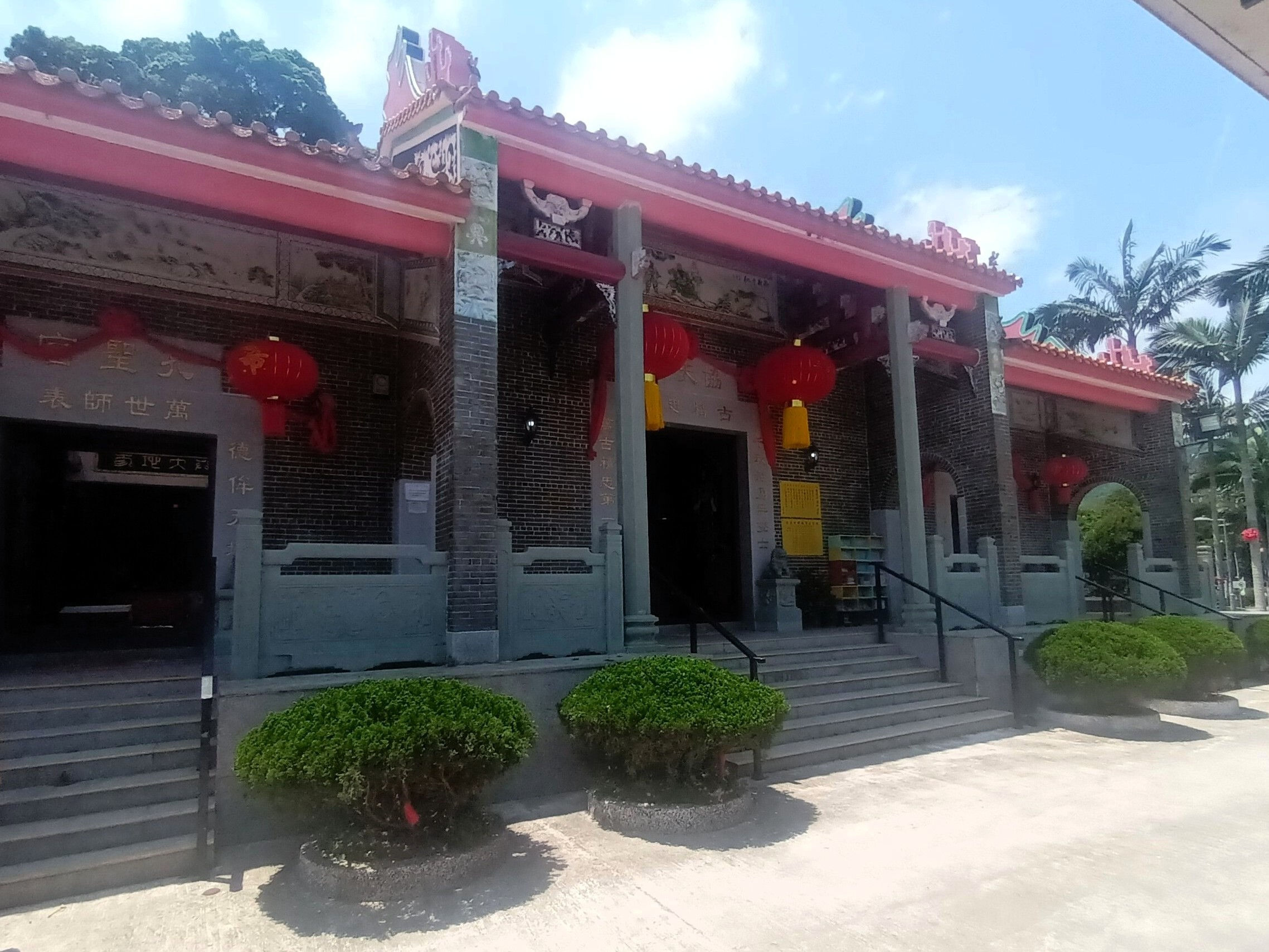
Shuen Wan Temples north of Ha Tei Ha

Ha Tei Ha (Chinese: 蝦地下) is a village in Tai Po District, Hong Kong.

== Administration ==
Ha Tei Ha is a recognized village under the New Territories Small House Policy. It is one of the villages represented within the Tai Po Rural Committee. For electoral purposes, Ha Tei Ha is part of the Shuen Wan constituency, which was formerly represented by So Tat-leung until October 2021.

== See also ==
- Plover Cove
