= Po Sam Pai =

Village in Plover Cove, Tai Po District, Hong Kong

Coordinates: 22.441985°N 114.175226°E

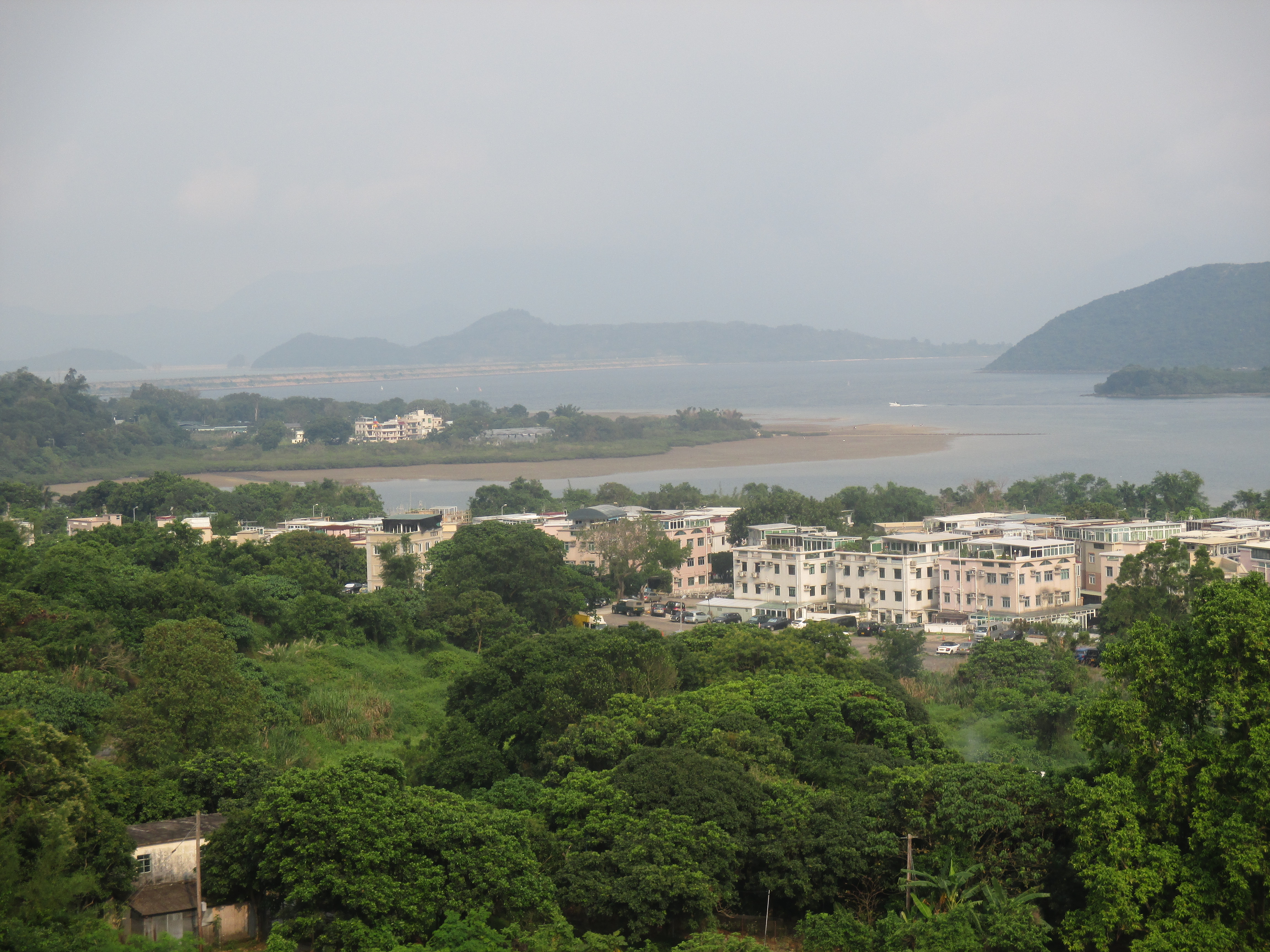
Po Sam Pai and Plover Cove viewed from Tsz Shan Monastery.

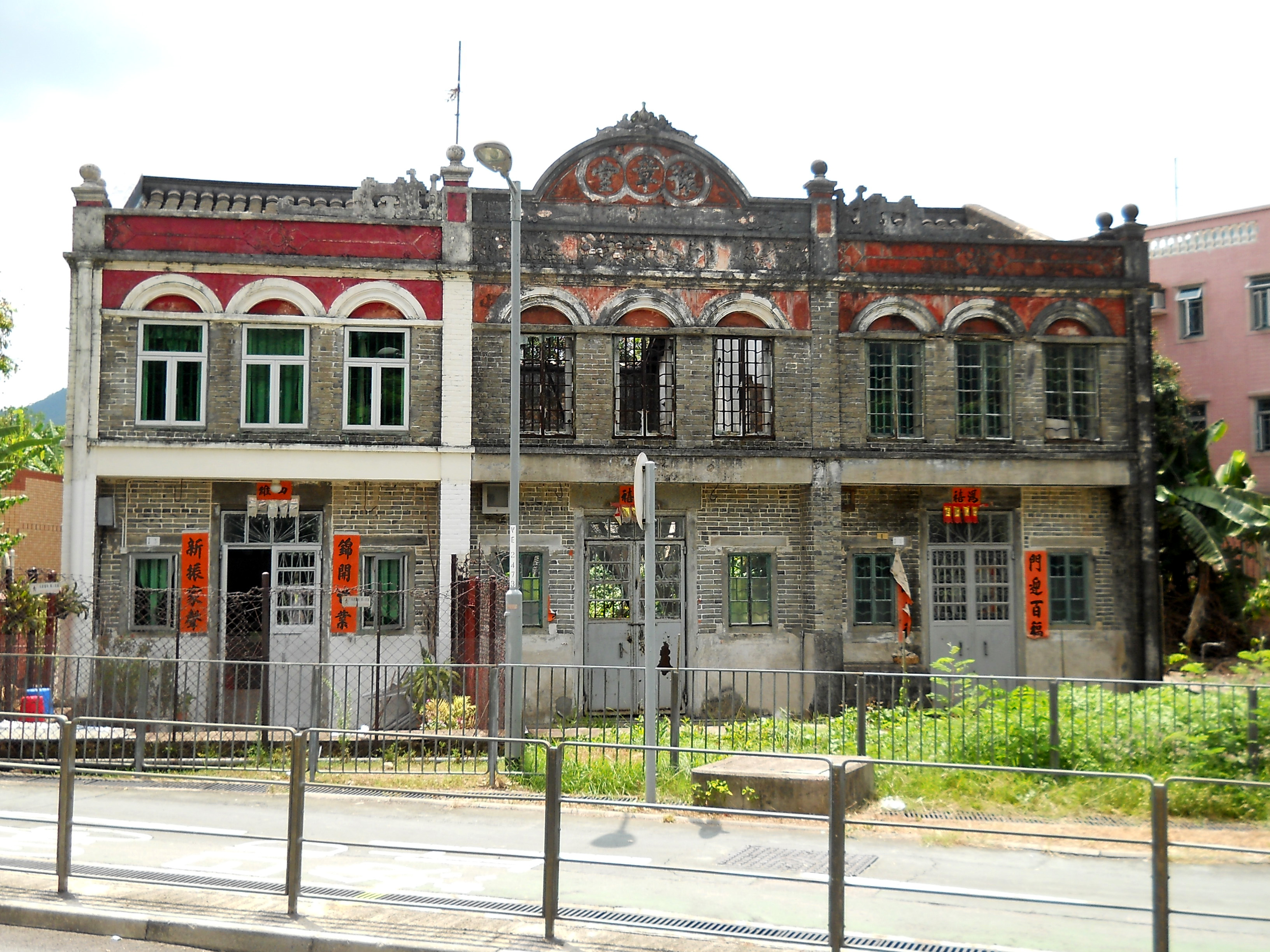
Yu Cheung Tong in Po Sam Pai.

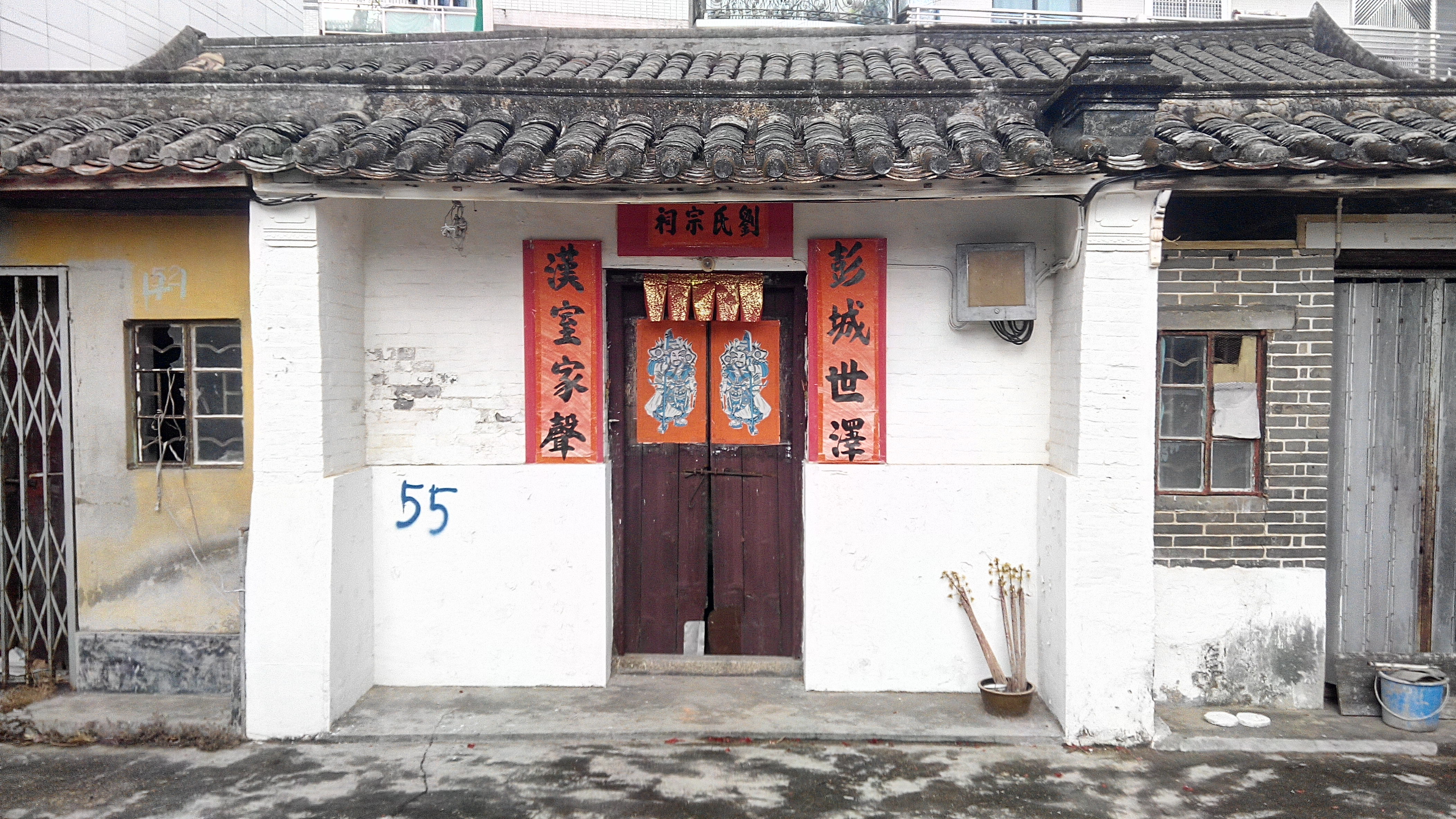
Lau Ancestral Hall in Po Sam Pai.

Po Sam Pai (Chinese: 布心排) is a village in Plover Cove, Tai Po District, Hong Kong.

== Administration ==
Po Sam Pai is a recognized village under the New Territories Small House Policy. It is one of the villages represented within the Tai Po Rural Committee. For electoral purposes, Po Sam Pai is part of the Shuen Wan constituency, which was formerly represented by So Tat-leung until October 2021.

== History ==
At the time of the 1911 census, the population of Po Sam Pai was 156. The number of males was 70.
