= Plover Cove =

Cove in the Tai Po District of Hong Kong

Coordinates: 22°27′29″N 114°14′22″E

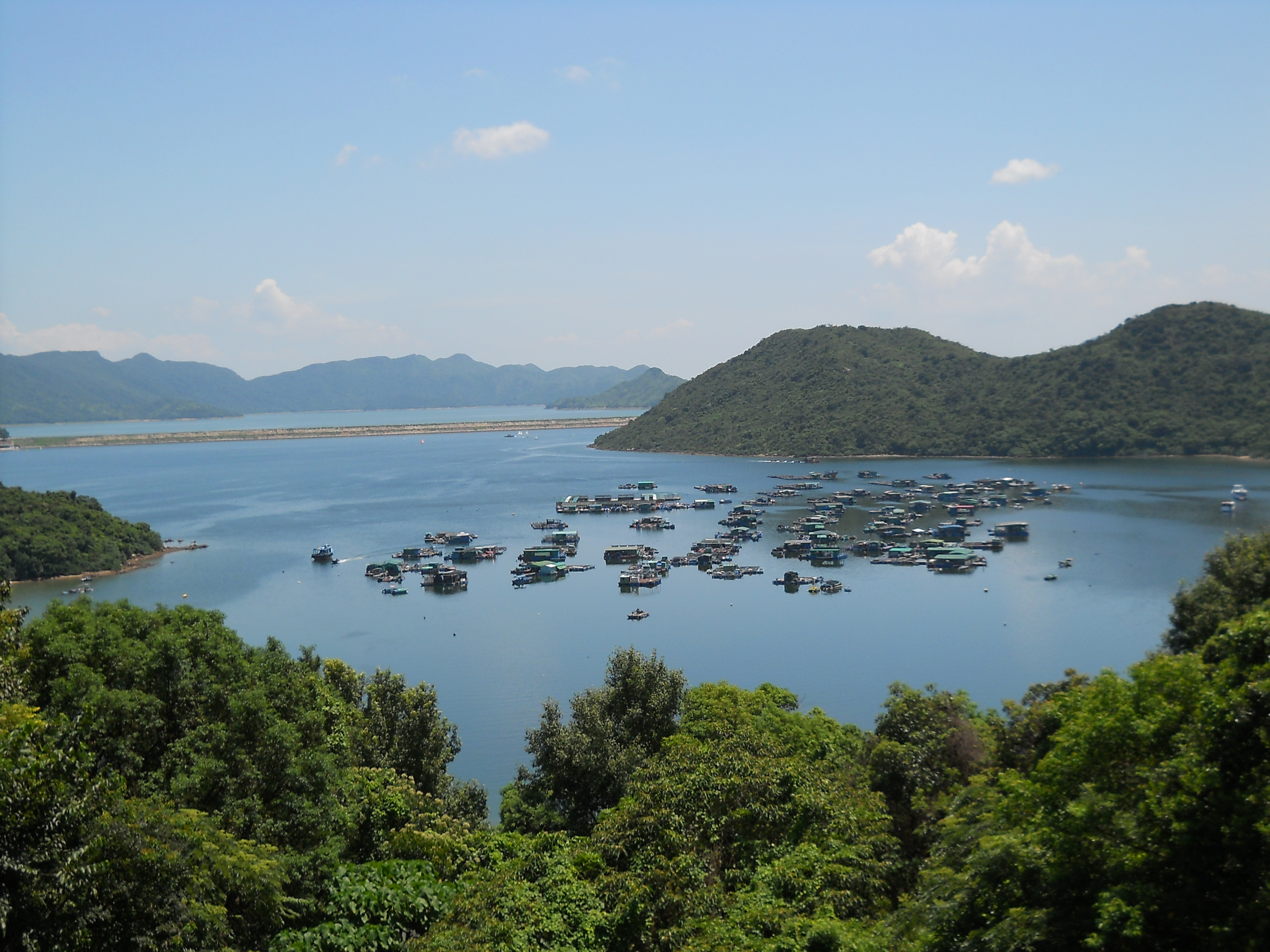
Fish farming at Plover Cove. Plover Cove Reservoir (left) and Ma Shi Chau (right) are visible in the background.

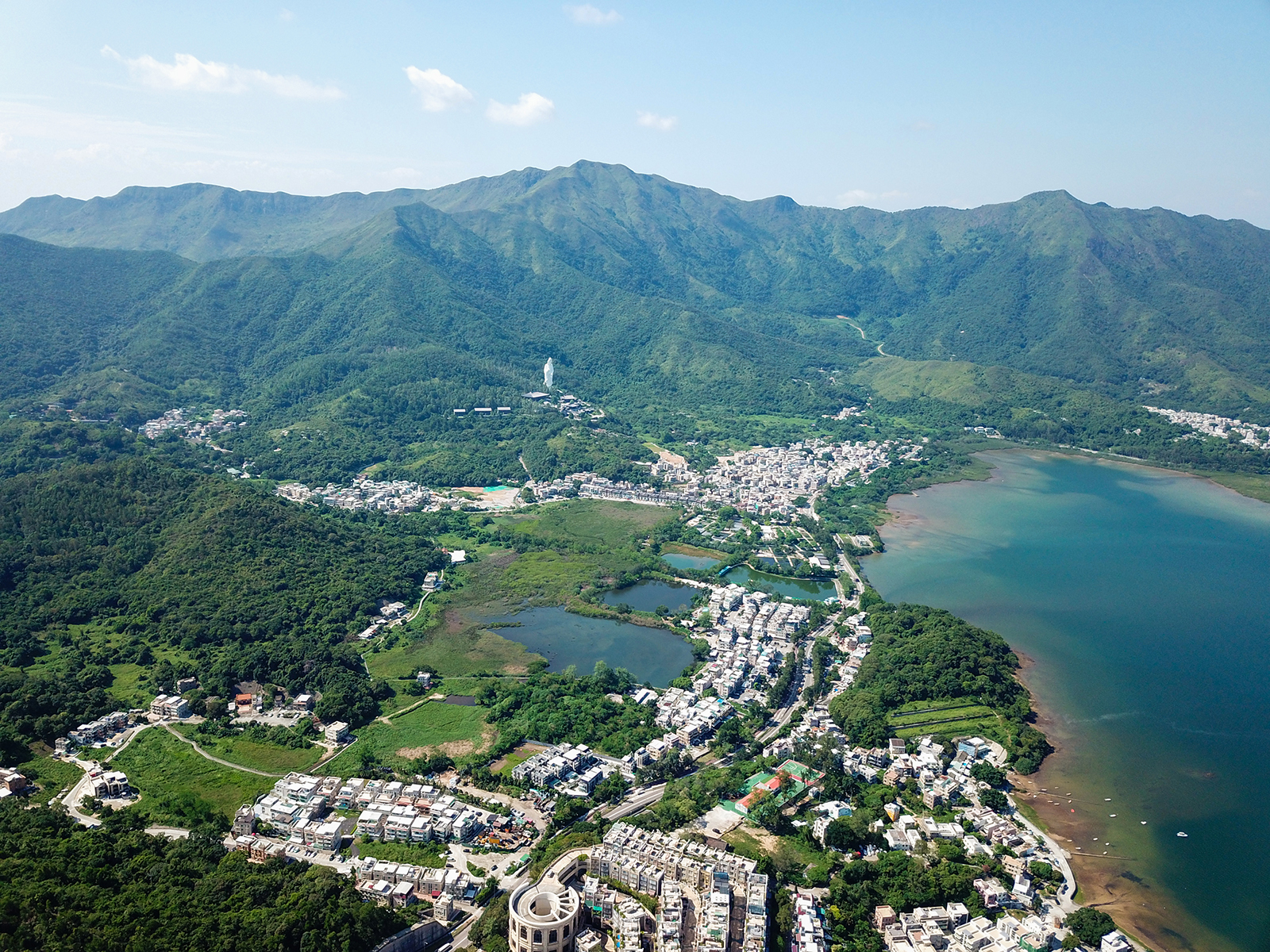
Plover Cove and the Shuen Wan area

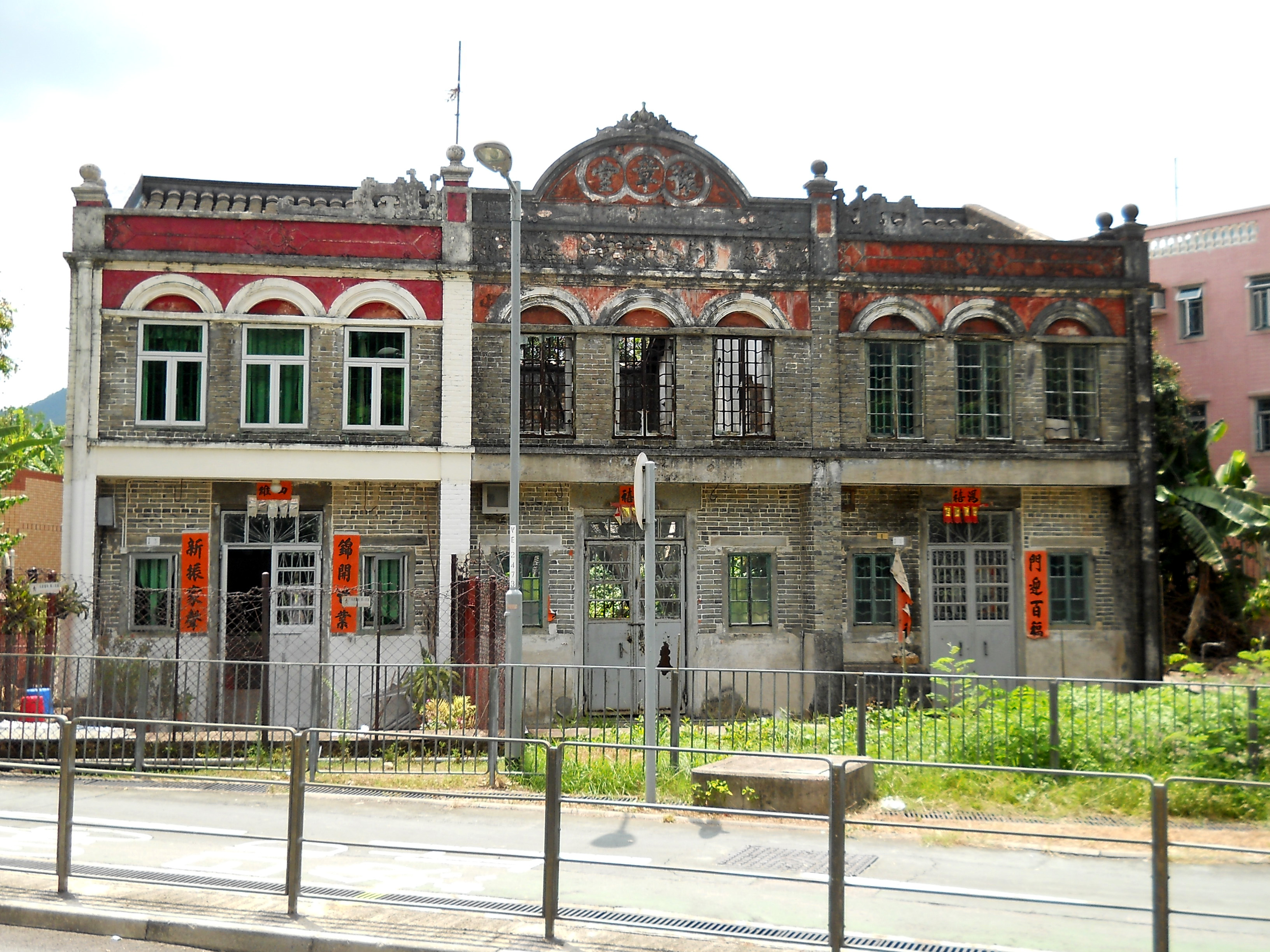
Yu Cheung Tong in Po Sam Pai

Plover Cove, also known by its Chinese names Shuen Wan Hoi (Chinese: 船灣海; Jyutping: syun4 waan1 hoi2) or Shuen Wan (船灣), is a cove in the Tai Po District of Hong Kong, near Tolo Channel and Tolo Harbour.

== Geography ==
It is encircled by the hills Pat Sin Leng and Wan Leng (橫嶺), the Yim Tin Tsai, Ma Shi Chau and Tung Tau Chau (東頭洲) island ranges, and a long peninsula extending from Fu Tau Sha (虎頭沙). A major part of the cove has been dammed to form the fresh water Plover Cove Reservoir.

A land area between Sha Lan Tsuen and Ting Kok is also known as Shuen Wan.

The community of Shuen Wan Heung is made up of the eleven villages of A Shan, Tung Tsz, Wai Ha, Ha Tei Ha, Tseng Tau, San Tau Kok, Wong Yue Tan, Chim Uk, Chan Uk, Lei Uk and Sha Lan. An administrative organ for Shuen Wan Heung was established in 1992.

Historically, Ting Kok, together with the nearby Hakka villages of Shan Liu, Lai Pik Shan, Lo Tsz Tin, Lung Mei and Tai Mei Tuk belonged to the Ting Kok Yeuk (汀角約) alliance.

== Cross Tolo Harbour Open Race ==
The annual Cross Tolo Harbour Open Race, an open-water swimming event organized in September/October by Tai Po Sports Association, starts at Sha Lan Tsuen near Sam Mun Tsai and finishes at Tai Mei Tuk. The course runs across Plover Cove in straight-line format and is approximately 2,600 metres in length.

== See also ==
- Plover Cove Country Park
- Po Sam Pai
- San Tau Kok
- Wong Yue Tan
- Shuen Wan (constituency)
