= Shuen Wan (constituency) =

Constituency of Hong Kong

- Elected constituency for the Tai Po District Council
- Boundary of Shuen Wan in Tai Po District
- District: Tai Po
- Legislative Council constituency: New Territories North East
- Population: 20,409 (2019)
- Electorate: 10,133 (2019)

Current constituency
- Created: 1982
- Number of members: One
- Member(s): So Tat-leung (Independent)

Shuen Wan (Chinese: 船灣) is one of the 19 constituencies in the Tai Po District of Hong Kong.

The constituency returns one district councillor to the Tai Po District Council, with an election every four years.

Shuen Wan constituency has an estimated population of 20,409.

== Councillors represented ==
Election	Member	Party
1982	Chan Kwun-yau	Nonpartisan
1997 by-election	Chan Mei-tak	DAB
2003	Lo Sam-shing	Nonpartisan
2011	Lau Chee-shing	Independent
2019	So Tat-leung→Vacant	Nonpartisan

== Election results ==
=== 2010s ===
Tai Po District Council Election, 2019: Shuen Wan
Party	Candidate	Votes	%	±%
Nonpartisan	So Tat-leung	3,583	50.99	
Independent	Lau Chee-sing	3,444	49.01	
Majority		139	1.98	
Turnout		7,053	69.62	
Nonpartisan gain from Independent		Swing		
