= Komachi =

Komachi may refer to:

== People ==
- Ono no Komachi (825–900), Japanese poet
- Sadamu Komachi (小町 定; 1920–2012), Imperial Japanese Navy fighter pilot ace
- Kyoji Komachi (小町 恭士; born 1946), Japanese diplomat and former Ambassador to Thailand.
- Komachi is a ring name, used by various professional wrestlers in Japan

- Volador Jr., was the first to use the name.
- Místico took over the part after Volador (born 1982), Jr.
- Mike Segura (born 1969), who sometimes worked as "Komachi II"

== Fictional characters ==
- Komachi Akimoto, a character in Yes! PreCure 5
- Komachi Onozuka, a character in Phantasmagoria of Flower View from the Touhou Project series

== Places ==
- Komachi (train), the name of a Japanese train service
- Komachi (Kanagawa), a neighbourhood in Kamakura, Kanagawa prefecture, Japan
- Komachi, Iran, a village in South Khorasan Province, Iran
- Komachi Ōji, is a street in Kamakura, Kanagawa

== Other uses ==
- Kayoi Komachi, is a Noh play by Kan'ami Kiyotsugu
- Komachi Sōshi, is a Japanese otogi-zōshi in one or two volumes
- Komachi Monogatari, is a Japanese otogi-zōshi in two volumes
- Sekidera Komachi, a Japanese Noh play
- Sotoba Komachi (Mishima), is one of the stories in Five Modern Noh Plays
- Sotoba Komachi, is a Noh play written by Kan'ami
