= Nine stages of decay =

Buddhist meditation about a decaying corpse

The contemplation of the nine stages of a decaying corpse is a Buddhist meditational practice in which the practitioner imagines or observes the gradual decomposition of a dead body. Along with paṭikūlamanasikāra, this type of meditation is one of the two meditations on "the foul" or "unattractive" (aśubha). The nine stages later became a popular subject of Buddhist art and poetry. In Japan, images of the stages are called kusōzu (九相図, lit. 'nine-phase pictures') and became related to aesthetic ideas of impermanence.

Early instances of the nine stages of decay can be found in the Satipaṭṭhāna Sutta, (–20 BC) the "Sutra on the Samādhi Contemplation of the Oceanlike Buddha," and the "Discourse on the Great Wisdom" (Mahaprajnaparamitita-sastra) by Nagarjuna (c. 150–250 AD). The stages listed in the Mahaprajnaparamitita-sastra spread to Japan, probably through Chinese Tiantai writings including the Mohe Zhiguan of Zhiyi (438–497 AD), and influenced medieval Japanese art and literature.

The setting for the nine stages is outdoors, where a corpse would be left exposed to decay in a field, graveyard, or charnel ground. The exact stages included vary between sources. The Mahaprajnaparamitita-sastra refers to the stages as the nine aśubhasaṃjñā अशुभसंज्ञा lit. 'nine horrible notions,' and lists them as follows:

1. distension (vyādhmātakasaṃjñā)
2. rupture (vidhūtakasaṃjñā)
3. exudation of blood (vilohitakasaṃjñā)
4. putrefaction (vipūyakasaṃjñā)
5. discolouration and desiccation (vinīlakasaṃjñā)
6. consumption by animals and birds (vikhāditakasaṃjñā)
7. dismemberment (vikṣiptaka)
8. reduction to bones (asthisaṃjñā)
9. parching to dust (vidagdhakasaṃjñā)

== History ==
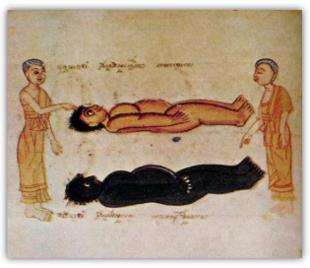
Asubha kammaṭṭhāna in a Thai samut khoi manuscript, about a century old.

Various techniques of meditation on the process of bodily decay date back to early Buddhism, originating in India. A related meditation, asubha kammaṭṭhāna involves ten stages of decay. Early lists of nine stages of decay can be found in the "Sutra on the Samādhi Contemplation of the Oceanlike Buddha," and the "Discourse on the Great Wisdom" (Mahaprajnaparamitita-sastra) Different purposes have been assigned to the contemplation of the nine stages of a decaying corpse, and the details of the practice transformed over time.

Buddhist monks used the contemplation of a decaying corpse as a monastic practice to reduce sensual desire. In one Japanese tale, a monk called Genpin who has fallen in love with a chief councillor's wife overcomes this desire by imagining the woman's body decaying, and thus attains enlightenment by understanding the nature of the body. In as much as the practice served to reduce sexual desire of a male practitioner, the corpse in question tended to be female. However, the nine stages were also used to reduce one's attachment to one's own body, and women themselves were encouraged to participate in the contemplation of their bodily impurity. According to some Theravāda sources such as the Visuddhimagga, the practitioner must seek a corpse of their own sex to contemplate, as doing otherwise would be unchaste. The Mahaprajnaparamitita-sastra emphasises that the differences between men and women are obscured even by the first stage of decay. The corpses in kusōzu are explicitly female.

In some texts, the contemplation of different phases is recommended for the elimination of different aspects of lust for the body. For example, the Mahaprajnaparamitita-sastra recommends phases 8 and 9 to eliminate the "lust for touch," but phases 3, 4, and 5 for the "lust for colours." In addition to eliminating rāga (lust), the sastra claims the practice may reduce dveṣa (hatred) and moha (delusion), the other two of the three poisons in Buddhism.

Buddhist sources also suggest that real corpses were originally observed as part of the practice, without the practitioner relying on pure imagination. This was possible in cultural contexts where corpses were left exposed in graveyards and fields. With training, the image could be retained and summoned at will, as in the tale of Genpin above. Later, pictorial aids developed in China, leading to the development of kusōzu as an art form in Japan. kusōzu gained aesthetic significance in addition to their meditative function as impermanence (無常 mujou) was already a major feature of Japanese art and literature.

== Pictorial representations ==
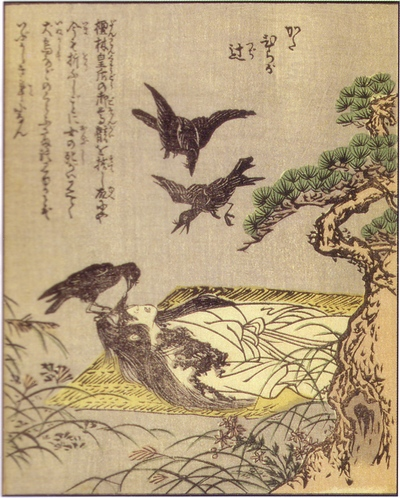
Birds eat the corpse of Empress Danrin, Ehon Hyaku Monogatari (1841)

There is literary evidence of pictorial representations of the nine stages of decay from China during the Tang dynasty, including Baoji's poem Contemplation on the Mural of the Nine Stages of a Decaying Corpse (c. 618-907 AD). Japanese images of the nine stages, called kusōzu, date from the 13th century. There are a large number of kusōzu still being used in religion in Japan, and Japanese artists such as Fuyuko Matsui have continued the theme of the nine stages into the 21st century.

Kusōzu vary in the presentation of their subjects. Some kusōzu such as the Jindou fujou souzu (人道不浄相図) present the decay of the female corpse in the context of the nature, "amidst a world of seasonal trees, flowers, and other flora." Others, including one very early example in the Komatsu collection, depict the stages against a blank background with high precision, "diagrammatic in [their] presentation."

Kusōzu were probably shown to laypeople for the purpose of teaching the doctrine of impermanence in e-toki sessions, and displayed during the Obon festival.

=== Paintings of Ono no Komachi ===
Although the subjects of kusōzu are typically anonymous noblewomen, there are many that are explicitly intended to depict the Heian Waka poet Ono no Komachi (小野小町). These depictions of Komachi are related to a tradition of literature that emphasises the contrast between her physical beauty during her youth, and her ageing and poverty at the end of her life. Such tales of Komachi's life, called Komachi densetsu (小町伝説) are a common subject of Noh plays including Kayoi Komachi (通小町), Sekidera Komachi (関寺小町), and Sotoba Komachi (卒塔婆小町).

=== In contemporary art ===
External image
- 九相觀 kusoukan (1932) by Seiu Itou

External image
- Keeping Up the Pureness (2004) by Fuyuko Matsui, from her New Kusōzu series

The kusōzu of Kinbaku painter Seiu Itou (1882–1961) have been linked to the modern erotic grotesque style (エログロ). Fuyuko Matsui's recent "New kusōzu" series was inspired by the traditional painting genre, but also founded honestly on the reality of being a human being and a woman in the world today, intending to transcend a mere adaptation of a classical theme and truly realise a contemporary kusōzu sequence.

== In poetry ==
The nine stages of decay have featured as the subject of several Chinese and Japanese poems. In Japan there are two main poems, attributed to Kuukai (774 – 835), founder of Shingon Buddhism, and Su Tongpo (1037 – 1101), a Song dynasty politician.

The Su Tongpo poem links the impermanence of the human form to changing natural and seasonal imagery. For example, the second verse, distension, describes the deceased's hair becoming entangled with grass roots:

肪脹新死名叵言
既經七日貌纔存
紅顏暗變失花麗
玄鬢先衰纏草根
六腑爛壞餘棺槨
四肢洪直臥郊原
郊原寂寞無隨者
獨趣冥途中有魂

Translation:

The distension makes the newly deceased hard to identify;
After only seven days, mere vestiges of the [original] appearance remain.
The rosy face has turned dark and lost its elegance;
The raven hair, first withered, is now tangled with grass roots.
Six organs are putrefied and the corpse pushes out beyond the coffin;
The four limbs have hardened and lie on the deserted field.
The field is desolate, and no one is present;
The spirit has gone to the other world in solitude.

== In Literature ==
Genshin, a Buddhist affiliated with Pure Land school, wrote the work Ōjōyōshū in which he put the kusōzu in a doctrinal and functional context for the purpose of contemplating the nine stages of decay in connection to the six paths that a being can reincarnate into. With his work he wanted to highlight the horrifying aspects of the existence within these realms. The kusōzu were chosen to represent the impure aspect of human existence as the impurity can be understood through the decay of a corpse. He states: "it is odorous and defiled [...]. But, if it is seen, all desires [for the body] cease."

== Misogyny ==
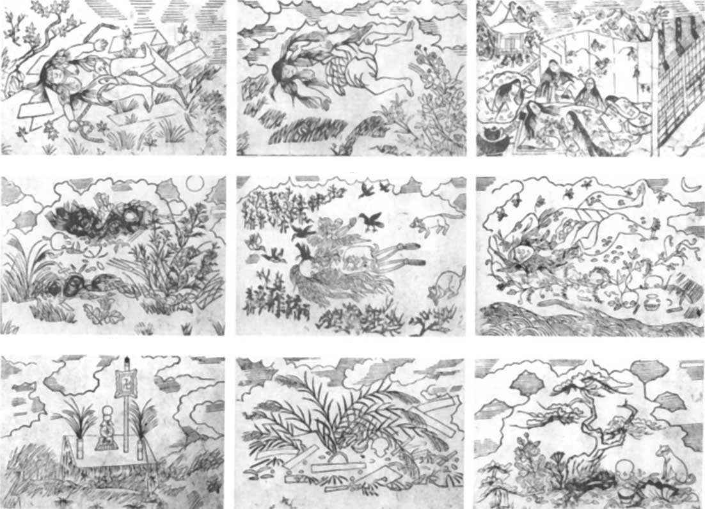
kusōzu illustrations taken from an Edo-period Kusoushi book that was probably intended for teaching moral precepts to female readers. A surviving copy of this book is marked with a seal of a woman's name.

The nine stages of decay, and kusōzu in particular, have been described as a manifestation of the misogyny inherent to some schools of Buddhism, in which women are situated as mere objects of contemplation, reinforcing the belief that women have a lesser ability to achieve Buddhahood than men. During the edo period, such ideas of the spiritual inferiority of women were used to indoctrinate the three obediences into women and girls. However, this analysis has been criticised with reference to hongaku teachings that posit that women have Buddha nature precisely because of their impurity. The tales of Empress Danrin and Empress Koumyou provide examples of women who willingly planned to expose their decaying bodies to the public as an act of Buddhist devotion, in the hope that "sentient beings in the Latter Days of the Buddhist Law should be awakened through exposure to the impure human condition."

== Paintings from The death of a noble lady and the decay of her body ==
The death of a noble lady and the decay of her body is a series of kusōzu paintings in watercolor, produced in Japan around the 18th century. The subject of the paintings is thought to be Ono no Komachi.

There are nine paintings, including a pre-death portrait, and a final painting of a memorial structure:

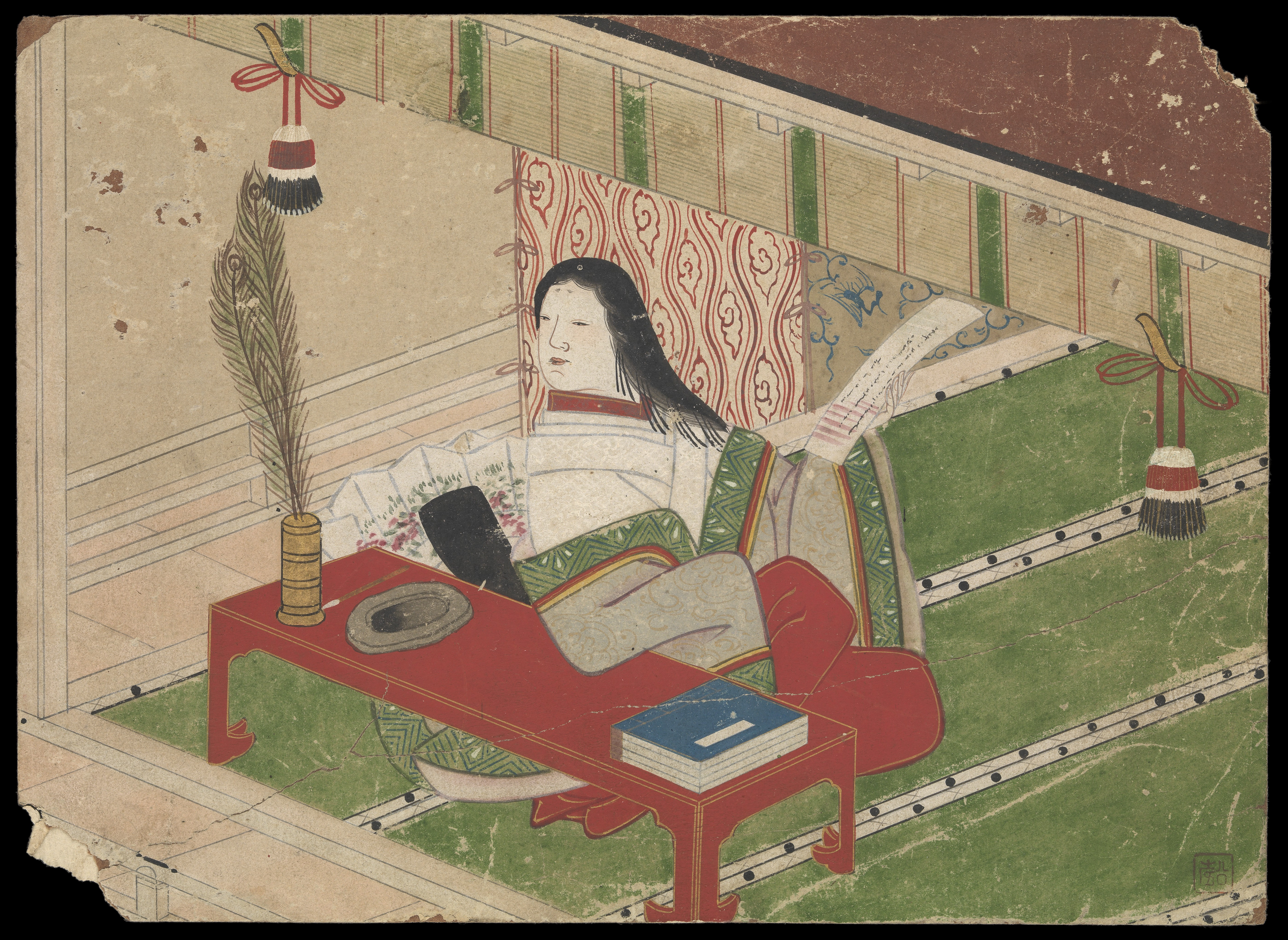
(1) Pre-death portrait. The woman is indoors, and has written her poem of farewell.

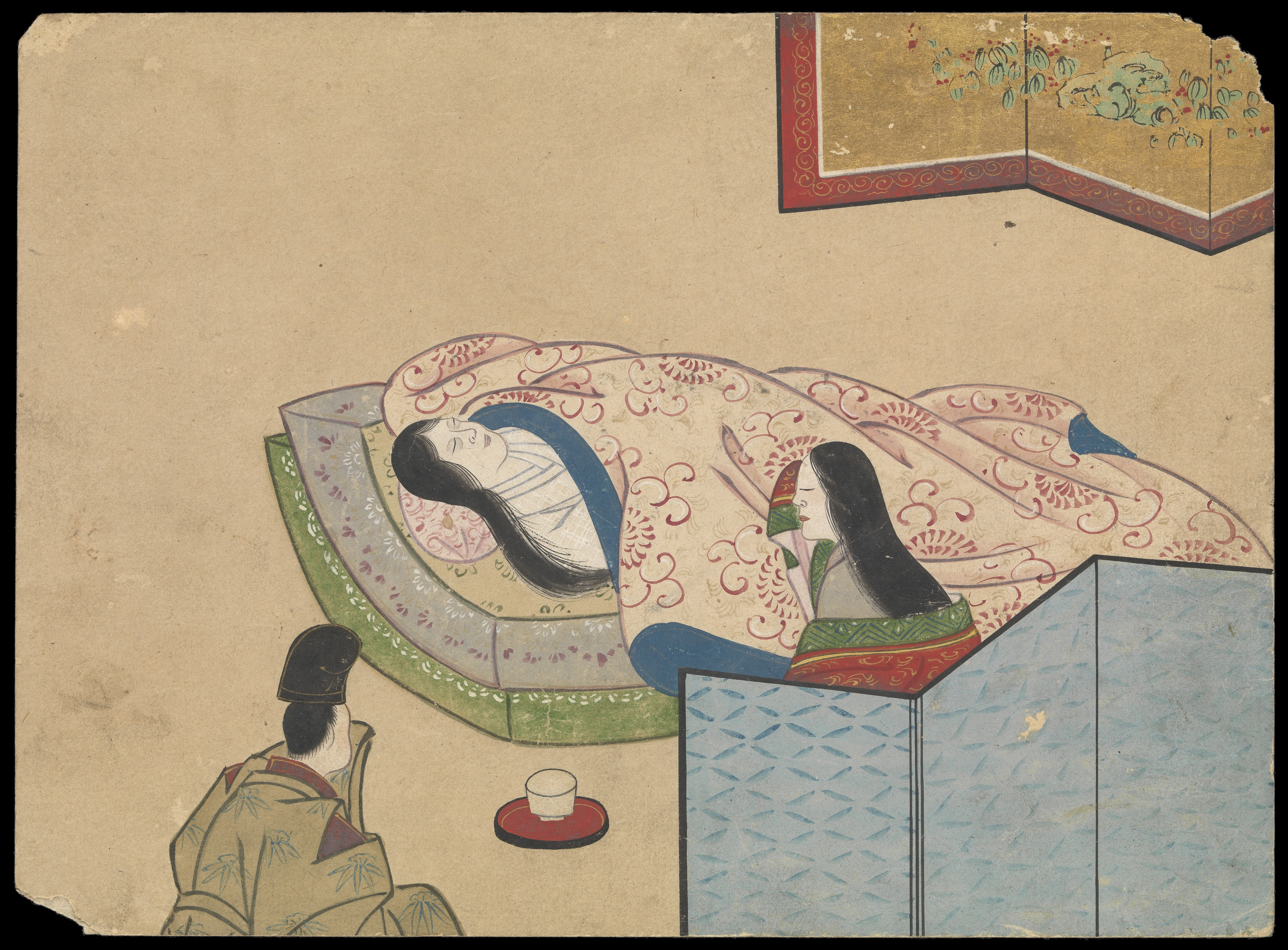
(2) The woman has died. Her loved ones mourn her.

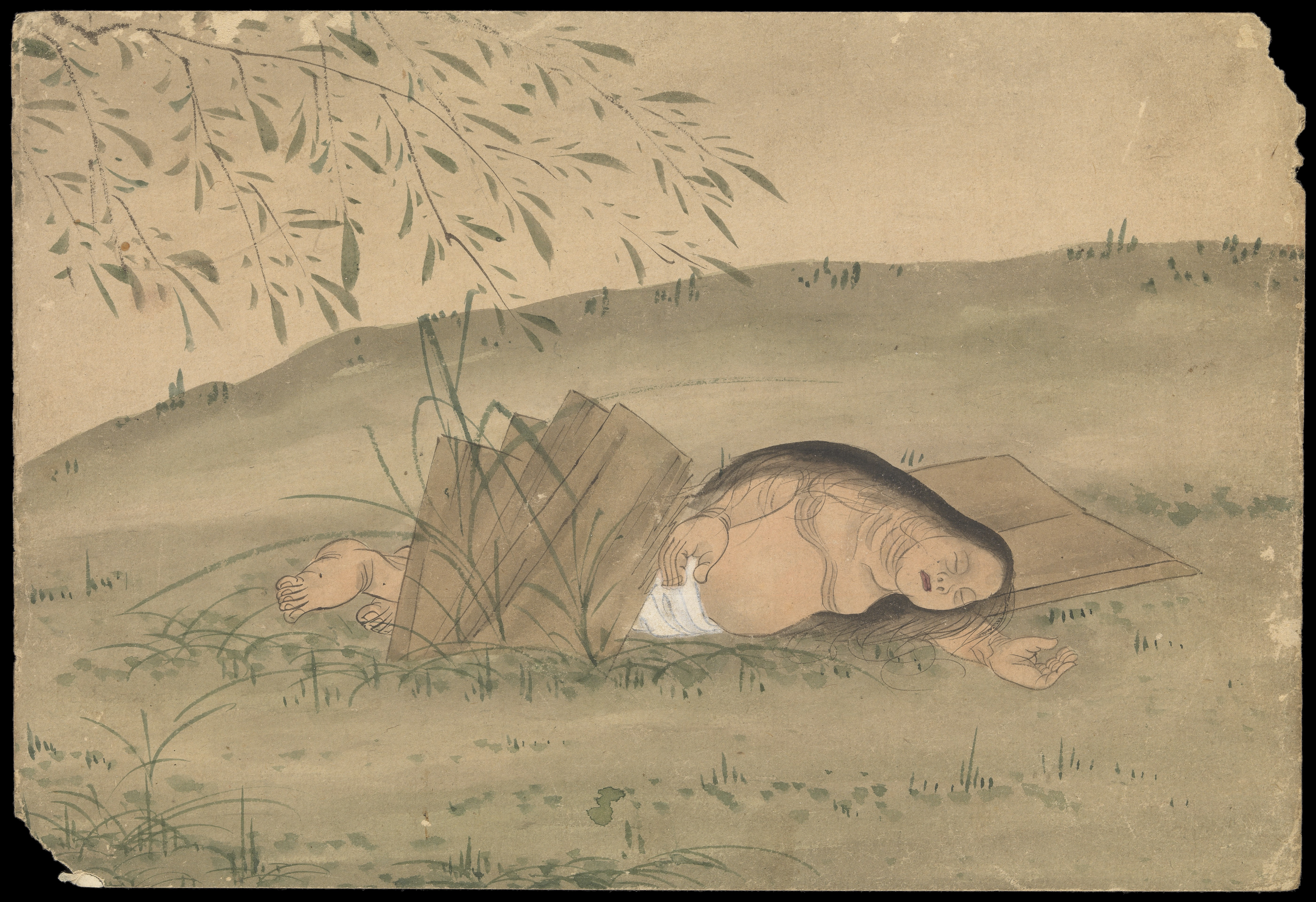
(3) Her body is left outside, and is subject to distension.

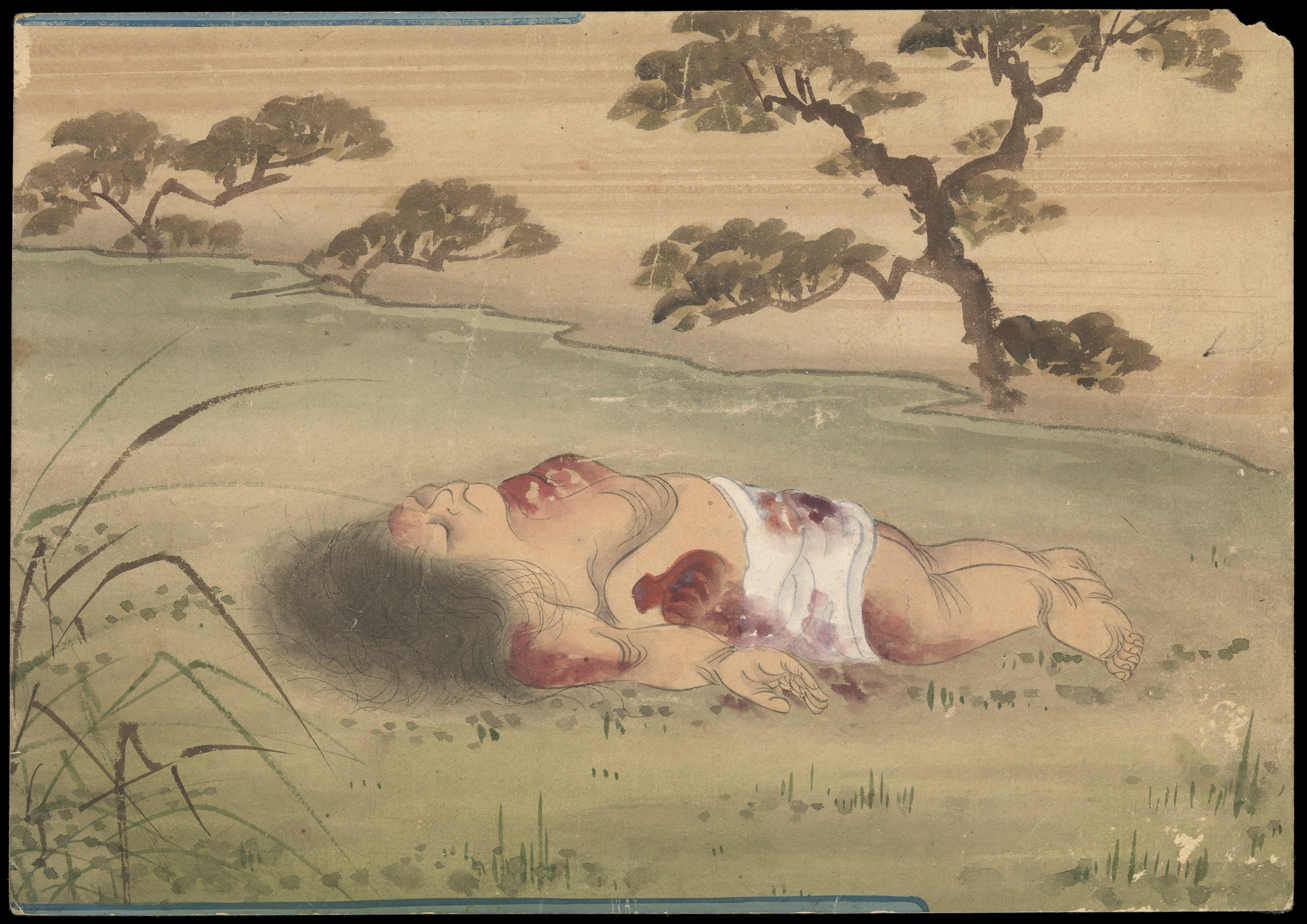
(4) The exudation of blood

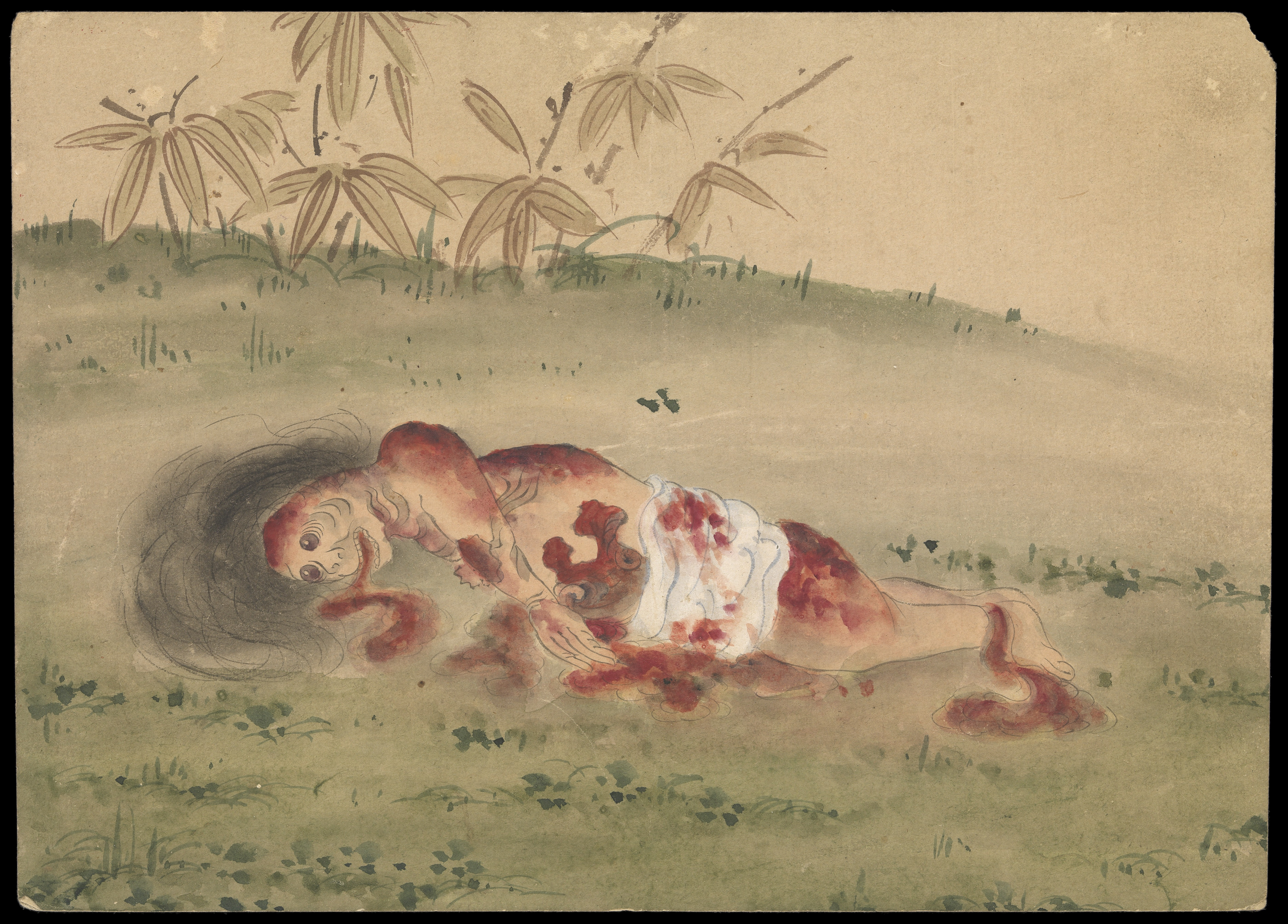
(5) Putrefaction

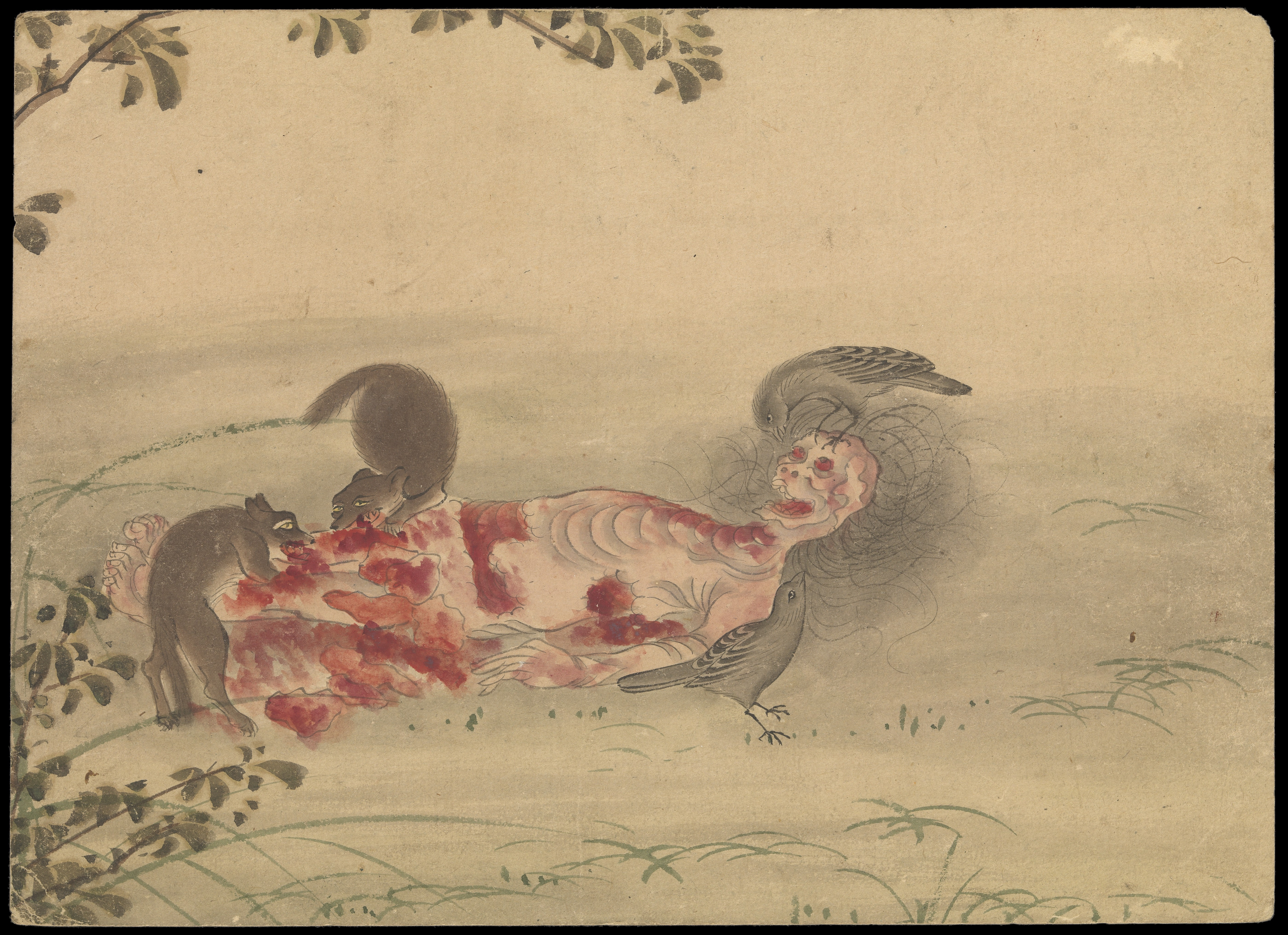
(6) Consumption by animals and birds

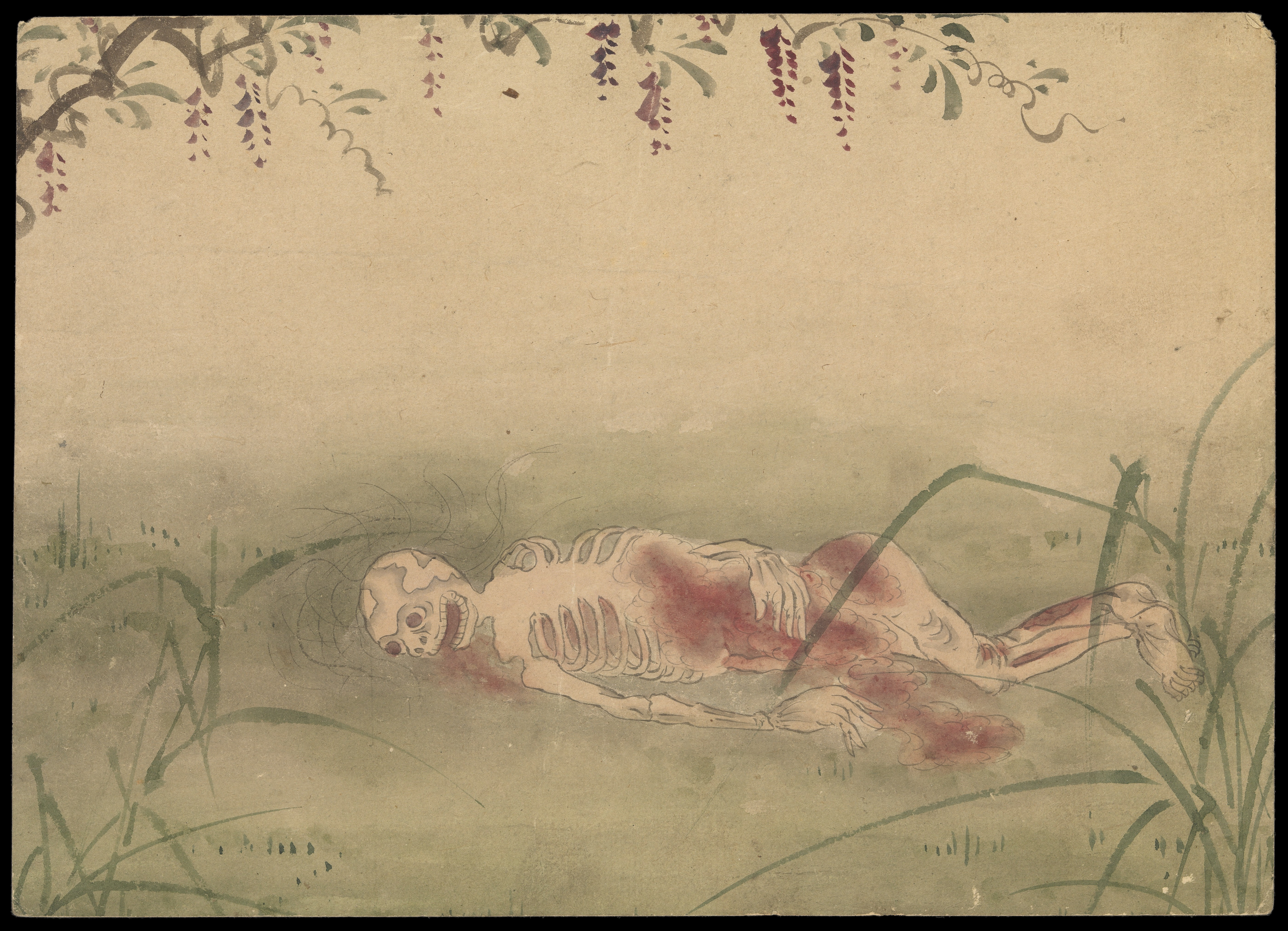
(7) The body reduced to a skeleton

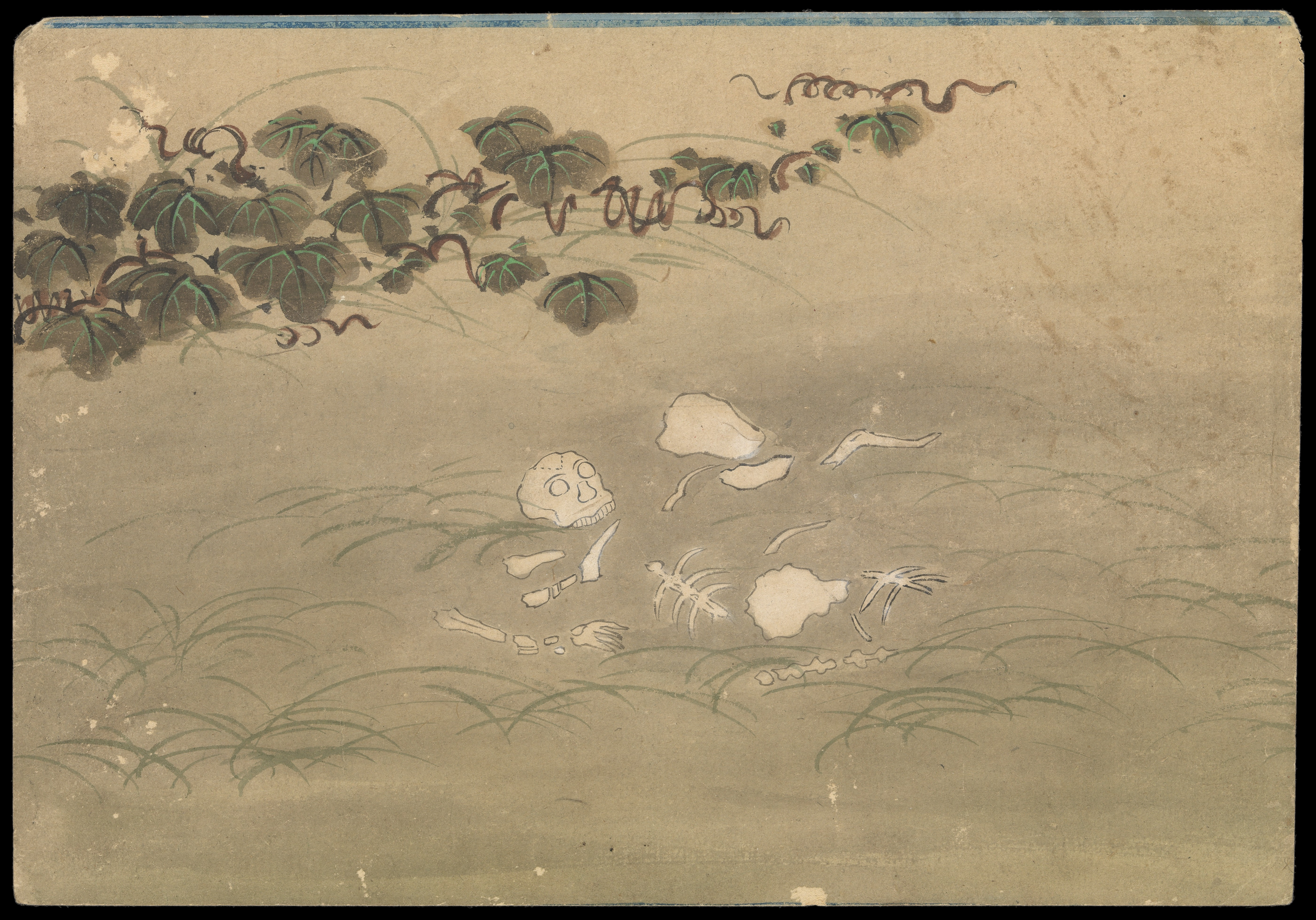
(8) The skeleton reduced to disjointed bones

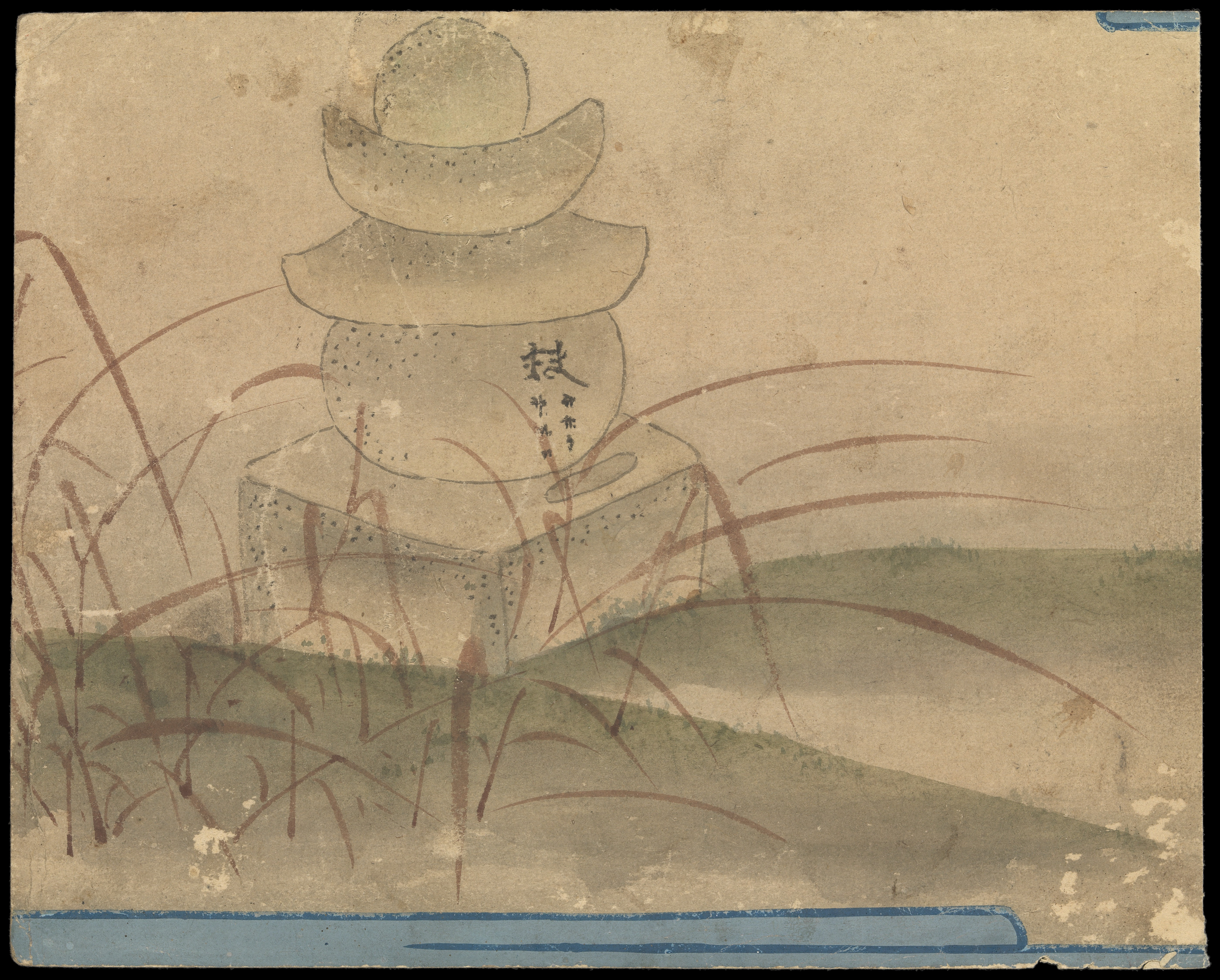
(9) Gorintou inscribed with the woman's death name.

== See also ==
- Maraṇasati – Mindfulness of death
- Sky burial – Tibetan burial practice in which the corpse is exposed to the elements
- Memento mori – A similar artistic trope
