= Komachi Monogatari =

16th-century Japanese prose

Komachi Monogatari (小町物がたり) is a Japanese otogi-zōshi in two volumes, composed late in the Muromachi period or the beginning of the early modern period (late 16th or 17th centuries).

== Date, genre and sources ==
Komachi Monogatari was composed some time between the end of the Muromachi period and the beginning of the Edo period.

It is a work of the otogi-zōshi genre. It is one of a large number of works, the so-called Komachi-mono (小町物), that draw on the legends surrounding the poet Ono no Komachi, a category that also includes Komachi Sōshi, Komachi Uta-arasoi, Kamiyo Komachi and Tamazukuri Monogatari. It specifically combines the dokuro-densetsu (髑髏伝説), legends about Komachi's skull being found in a grassy field, hyakuya-gayoi (百夜通い), legends that the courtier Fukakusa no Shōshō tried and tragically failed to visit her for one hundred nights, and sotoba-komachi. It is unique among the Komachi-mono for its setting in the Rendaino (蓮台野) and the appearance of the poet-monk Saigyō.

Takashi Fujii, in his article on the work for the Nihon Koten Bungaku Daijiten, identified the Noh play Sotoba Komachi as a source for the work.
