= Komachi Sōshi =

Komachi Sōshi (小町草紙) is a Japanese otogi-zōshi in one or two volumes, composed during the Muromachi period.

== Date, genre and sources ==
Komachi Sōshi was composed during the Muromachi period.

It is a work of the otogi-zōshi genre. It is one of a large number of works that draw on the legends surrounding the poet Ono no Komachi, a category that also includes Komachi Monogatari, Komachi Uta-arasoi, Kamiyo Komachi and Tamazukuri Monogatari. It specifically draws on the dokuro-densetsu (髑髏伝説), legends about Komachi's skull being found in a grassy field.

== Plot ==
Ono no Komachi, the great beauty and waka poet, has grown old and wretched. She prays to Kanzeon for salvation. She encounters Ariwara no Narihira, and the two discuss their romantic histories and how popular they had once been. Komachi abandons the capital when she is ridiculed for her decrepit appearance, and travels to the Tōkaidō and eventually to Mutsu Province. She composes poems at various famous sites (utamakura), but no one praises her poems as those of the great Komachi. Komachi eventually comes to grassy field of Tamazukuri-Ono in Mutsu, and there dies.

Narihira, travelling north on a journey of poetry composition, realizes that he is following in Komachi's footsteps. He hears the first half of a waka floating in the wind: kure-goto ni aki-kaze fukeba asa na asa na. Narihira completes the poem: ono to wa iwaji susuki no hitomura. Suddenly, a beautiful women appears as if from nowhere. She asks if he is a person from the capital and could deliver a message to Narihira for her. She says that since Narihira's name (業平) is written with the same characters as the aphorism Gō o tairamuru (業を平むる), calling his name must surely cause one's bad karma to disintegrate.

Narihira, thinking that this must surely have been the ghost of Komachi, digs through the long grass, but the woman is nowhere to be found, Narihira instead finding nothing but bones and pampas grass (hitomura susuki). Komachi and Narihira were avatars of Nyoirin Kannon and Jūichimen Kannon respectively.

== Textual tradition ==
The University of Tokyo has in its holdings a single-volume manuscript copied in Tenmon 14 (1545), with the title Ono no Komachi Sōshi (小野ゝ小町双紙). The Tenri Central Library possesses a printed copy dating from roughly the Genna era (1615–1624), and Waseda University and the Akagi Archive (赤木文庫 Akagi-bunko) both possess a Tan'en-bon (丹縁本) dating from around the Kan'ei era (1624–1644). It was also included in the Otogi-Zōshi Nijūsan-pen (御伽草子二十三編).

== Works cited ==
- Arikawa, Mikio (1983). "Komachi Sōshi". Nihon Koten Bungaku Daijiten 日本古典文学大辞典 (in Japanese). Vol. 2. Tokyo: Iwanami Shoten. p. 665. OCLC 11917421.
