= Tsz Shan Monastery =

Buddhist temple in Hong Kong

- 慈山寺
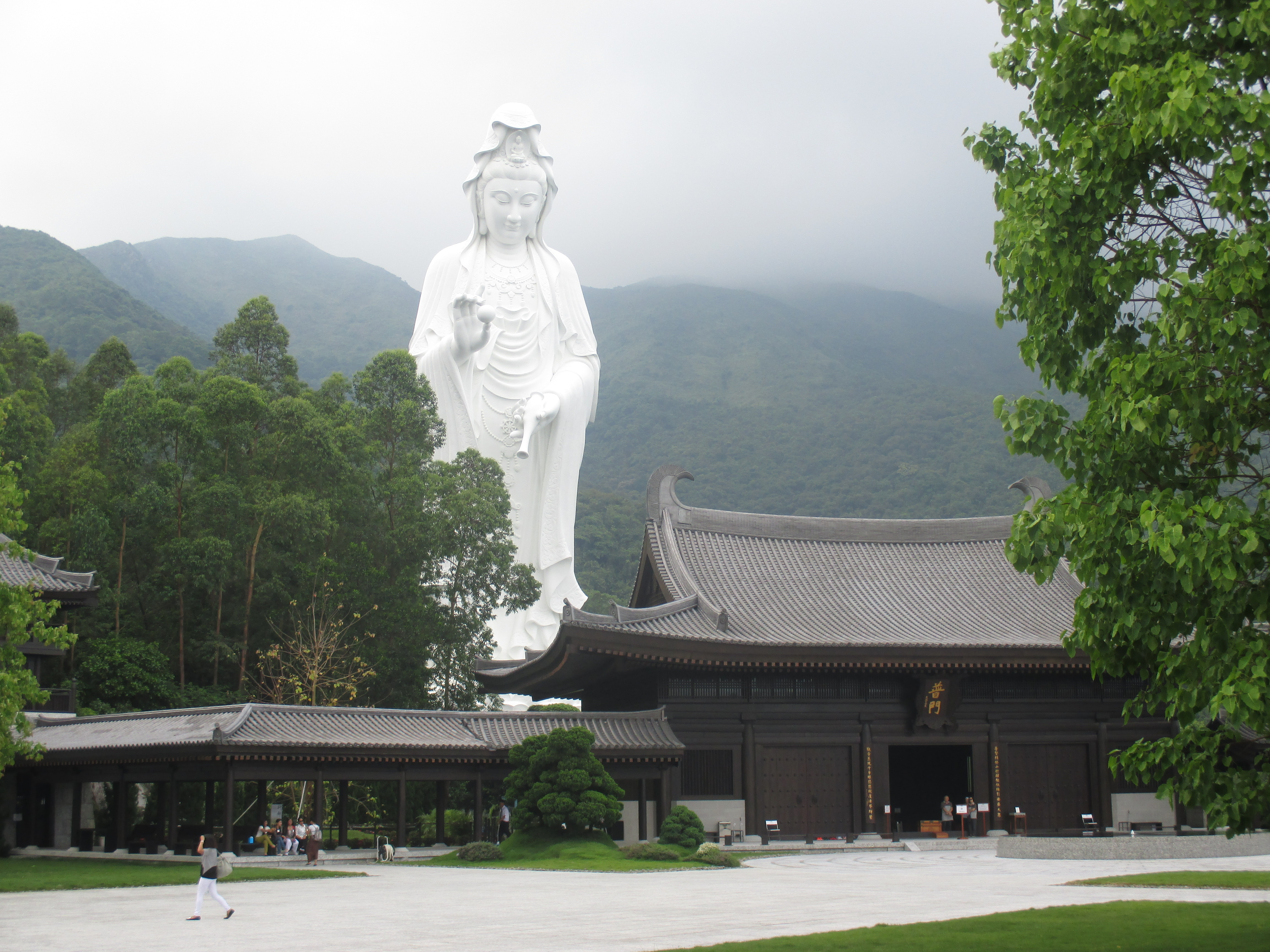
- Bronze Guanyin statue, 76 meters in Tsz Shan Monastery

- Location in Hong Kong

Religion
- Affiliation: Buddhism

Location
- Location: 88 Universal Gate Road, Tung Tsz
- Country: Hong Kong
- Interactive map of Tsz Shan Monastery
- Coordinates: 22.474203°N 114.205577°E

Architecture
- Architect: Ho Puay-peng
- Completed: April 2015; 11 years ago

Website
- www.tszshan.org

Tsz Shan Monastery (慈山寺) is a large Buddhist temple located in Tung Tsz, Tai Po District, Hong Kong. Within the monastery, there is a 76-meter tall bronze-cast white Guan Yin statue. Behind Tsz Shan Monastery is Pat Sin Leng (八仙嶺) and to its front, the Plover Cove Reservoir. The Monastery spans around 500,000 square feet.

The monastery opened to the public in April 2015. The idea for the development of Tsz Shan Monastery was germinated by Mr. Li Ka-shing, Founder of Li Ka Shing Foundation. The Foundation contributed more than HK$3.3 billion to cover the land acquisition and construction costs, as well as the Monastery’s operating expenses. Tsz Shan Monastery has been open to the public since April 2015.

The Tsz Shan Monastery Buddhist Art Museum, located beneath the Guan Yin statue, opened to the public in 2019.

== Architectural concept ==
Tsz Shan Monastery’s architectural style is inspired by the more solemn and elegant styles of the Tang, Northern Song, Liao and Jin dynasties, which existed over a period of about 600 years beginning in the 7th century.

The Monastery appropriates elements of nature in its planning as well. Tsz Shan Monastery is located on a hilly site with an expansive sea view to the front. The core of the monastery consists of three main buildings placed along a central axis. Each building and associated courtyard is placed on platforms rising up the hill, well defined with surrounding corridors. On another axis branching off from the Grand Courtyard, devotees are led into the presence of the colossal image of Guan Yin, passing the Universal Gate.

Throughout its halls and its grounds, Tsz Shan Monastery provides many spaces for contemplation, both open or intimate, formal or seemingly unplanned. But even inside its most stately buildings, nature is present throughout: dark African padauk wood, wavy white-grey granite, marble and bronze are the monastery's most important building materials. They are ones of texture and richness with a connection to origin.

== Guan Yin statue ==
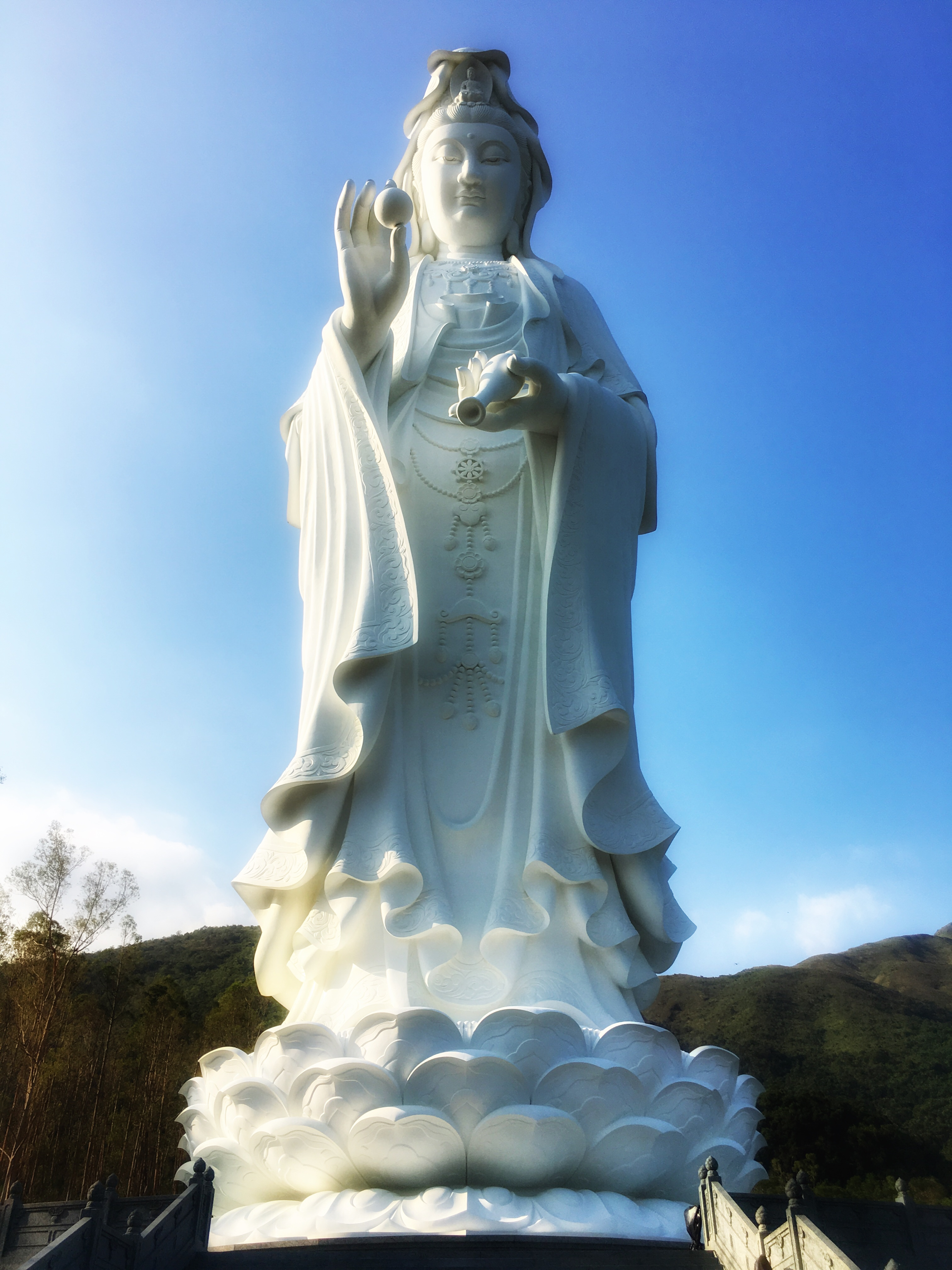
Ruyilun Guanyin

The Guan Yin (Avalokiteśvara) Statue has a height of 76 metres, comprising a 70-metre-tall bronze-cast white Guan Yin statue (including a three-tier bronze lotus platform) built upon a 6-metre high granite base. The statue is coated with white fluorocarbon self-cleaning paint and is modeled on sculptures of the Song dynasty.

Guan Yin has a compassionate and graceful demeanour and on her topknot there is a small image of Amitābha, implying the blessings and protection received through his immeasurable power. In her right hand she holds a wisdom maṇi pearl and in her left hand a vase, from which she pours pure water to cleanse the phenomenal world. She wears a keyūra necklace and her clothes drape elegantly. Her body leans forward as she looks down from above on all beings, guiding them to enlightenment with her compassion and wisdom.

== Spiritual practices ==
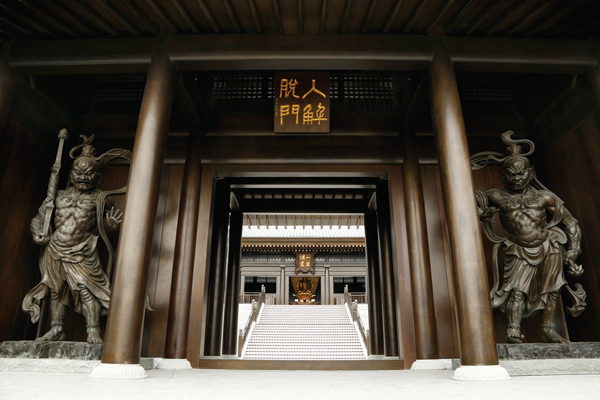
Statue of Mìjī jīngāng (Guhyapada) on the right and Nàluōyán Jīngāng (Narayana) on the left of the shanmen in Tsz Shan Monastery.

According to traditional Buddhist teachings, tea meditation, water offering, Zen calligraphy, and walking meditation are all important practices in everyday life, reminding us of the importance of persistence in taming one's mind. Even in the face of chaos and confusion, one has to retain awareness to take care of the deluded mind. Through these practices, Tsz Shan Monastery wishes that every visitor can re-establish the habit of taking care of the mind as a way to nurture positive energy, in order to respond to the needs of body and mind in a proactive way.

== See also ==
- List of tallest statues
