= A Shan =

Settlement in Hong Kong

A Shan 鴉山
- Village
- Location within Hong Kong
- Coordinates: 22.472974°N 114.195193°E
- Country: Hong Kong
- Region: New Territories
- District: Tai Po District

A Shan (Chinese: 鴉山) is a village in the Plover Cove area of Tai Po District, New Territories, Hong Kong.

== Administration ==
Tseng Tau, including A Shan and Tung Tsz, is a recognised village under the New Territories Small House Policy.
