= A Shan Tseng Tau =

Village in Hong Kong

Coordinates: 22.47382°N 114.200185°E

A Shan Tseng Tau (Chinese: 鴉山井頭) or simply Tseng Tau (Chinese: 井頭) is a village in the Plover Cove area of Tai Po District, Hong Kong.

== Administration ==
Tseng Tau, including A Shan and Tung Tsz, is a recognized village under the New Territories Small House Policy.

== History ==
At the time of the 1911 census, the population of Tseng Tau was 48. The number of males was 21.
