= Fuyuko Matsui =

Japanese artist (born 1974)

- Born: January 20, 1974 (age 52); Morimachi, Shizuoka Prefecture, Japan
- Education: PhD in Japanese Painting, Tokyo University of the Arts and Music
- Known for: Neo-Japanese painting
- Website: www.matsuifuyuko.com

Fuyuko Matsui (松井冬子, Matsui Fuyuko; born January 20, 1974) is a contemporary Japanese artist, specialized in Nihonga paintings. She is known for her "new Kusozu" series. Matsui has been making her works based on her psychoanalysis results, putting heavy weight on her feelings and interests in violence, experience of loss, repression, stress, and trauma.

Through the process of self-investigation, she found her works common to all living beings—life and death, sex, self-love, self-mutilation, self and the other, this world and the next, desire and passions.

== Biography ==
Her art has been widely exhibited in Japan and she has been featured on TV and magazines. She was one of the featured artists at the Museum of Contemporary Art, Tokyo's "Annual 2006" exhibition and at the Yokohama Museum of Art's "Nihonga Painting: Six Provocative Artists" in August 2006.

From late 2011 to early 2012, she had her first major retrospective at a large public museum. Entitled “Becoming Friends with All the Children in the World” the exhibition, held at the Yokohama Museum of Art included art from her entire career as well as new works.

Despite its often shocking aspects, her art is part of the tradition of Japanese art going back centuries. For example, her painting "Insane Woman under the Cherry Tree" (2006) is inspired by "Ogress under Willow Tree,” a painting by Soga Shohaku (1730–1781), the iconoclastic Edo-period painter, who was influenced by the art of the Muromachi Era painter Soga Jasoku (d. 1483).

Part of her interest in the past comes from her background. She grew up in Mori, Shizuoka Prefecture in a house that had been in her family for 14 generations.

When Japan was hit by the Great East Japan Earthquake in March 2011, Matsui was in her studio working on a painting.

"When the quake struck I was in my studio painting and the panel fell down and hit me”, she told CNN. “I quickly escaped outside, but I was so shocked by what happened in the Tohoku area that I couldn’t paint for two months. My mind was distraught. I stopped preparing for the Yokohama show."

In 2015, Matsui was chosen as a member of the 2020 Tokyo Olympics Emblem Committee.

== Education ==
Matsui earned her Bachelor of Fine Arts (B.F.A.) in Painting from Joshibi Junior College of Art and Design in 1994. In 2002 and 2004, she earned her bachelor's and master's degree of fine arts in Japanese Painting from Tokyo University of the Arts. Later in 2007, Matsui obtained her Doctoral Degree (PhD) in Japanese Painting with her doctoral dissertation "The Inescapable Awakening to Pain, Through Visual Perception via the Sensory Nerves."

== Works ==
Matsui shows her dedicated craftsmanship in her Japanese paintings. She was firstly trained in western-style painting, but in her later education in Japanese painting, she utilizes her western-style painting skills in her traditional works that deal with silk and Japanese pigments.

Matsui once said that she will only paint women, as she herself as a woman can only understand women's feelings. Her "New Kusozu" series was inspired by the traditional painting genre of Kusozu, but also founded honestly on the reality of being a human being and a woman in the world today, transcending a mere adaptation of a classical theme and truly realizes a contemporary Kusozu sequence. Her stance of being as faithful as possible to her own reality gives her works contemporary relevance and power.

== Exhibitions ==
Fuyuko Matsui held her first solo exhibition in 2004 at Ginza Surugadai Art Gallery in Tokyo, entitled: "L'espoir Fuyuko Matsui Exhibition."

In 2011, she held an exhibition "Fuyuko Matsui: Becoming Friends with All the Children in the World" at Yokohama Museum of Art, Kanagawa, Japan. The others include Hirano Museum, Shizuoka (2008), and Galerie DA-END, Paris (2010).

She had four group exhibitions in 2006 in Museum of Contemporary Art in Tokyo, Yokohama Museum of Art in Kanagawa, Tokyo University of the Arts and Music, and the Sato Museum of Art in Tokyo. In 2009, her works were displayed in the group exhibition "Medicine and Art" in Mori Art Museum in Tokyo. In 2010, she participated in the "Koizumi Yakumo-The Secret of Lafcadio Hearn" group exhibition in Contemporary Art Museum in Kumamoto.

In 2012, her works entered the group exhibition "Phantoms of Asia" in Asian Art Museum of San Francisco.

== Books ==
- Bessatsu Taiyō, Matsui Fuyuko: Geijutsu Wa Kakusei Wo Yōkyū Suru. Publisher: Heibonsha. 2021
- A Lock of Hair. Publisher: Matsuifuyuko Inc. 2019
- The catalogue of Yokohama Museum of Art: Fuyuko Matsui-Becoming Friends with All the Children in the World, Edited by Kenichi Kawai, Marimo Hisaki, Sae Yatsunagi, Kyoko Sakamoto. Tokyo: Editions Treville. 2011
- Matsui Fuyuko I & II. Publisher: Edition Treville. 2008
