= Tung Tsz =

Area in the Tai Po District of the New Territories, Hong Kong

Coordinates: 22.4743°N 114.1971°E

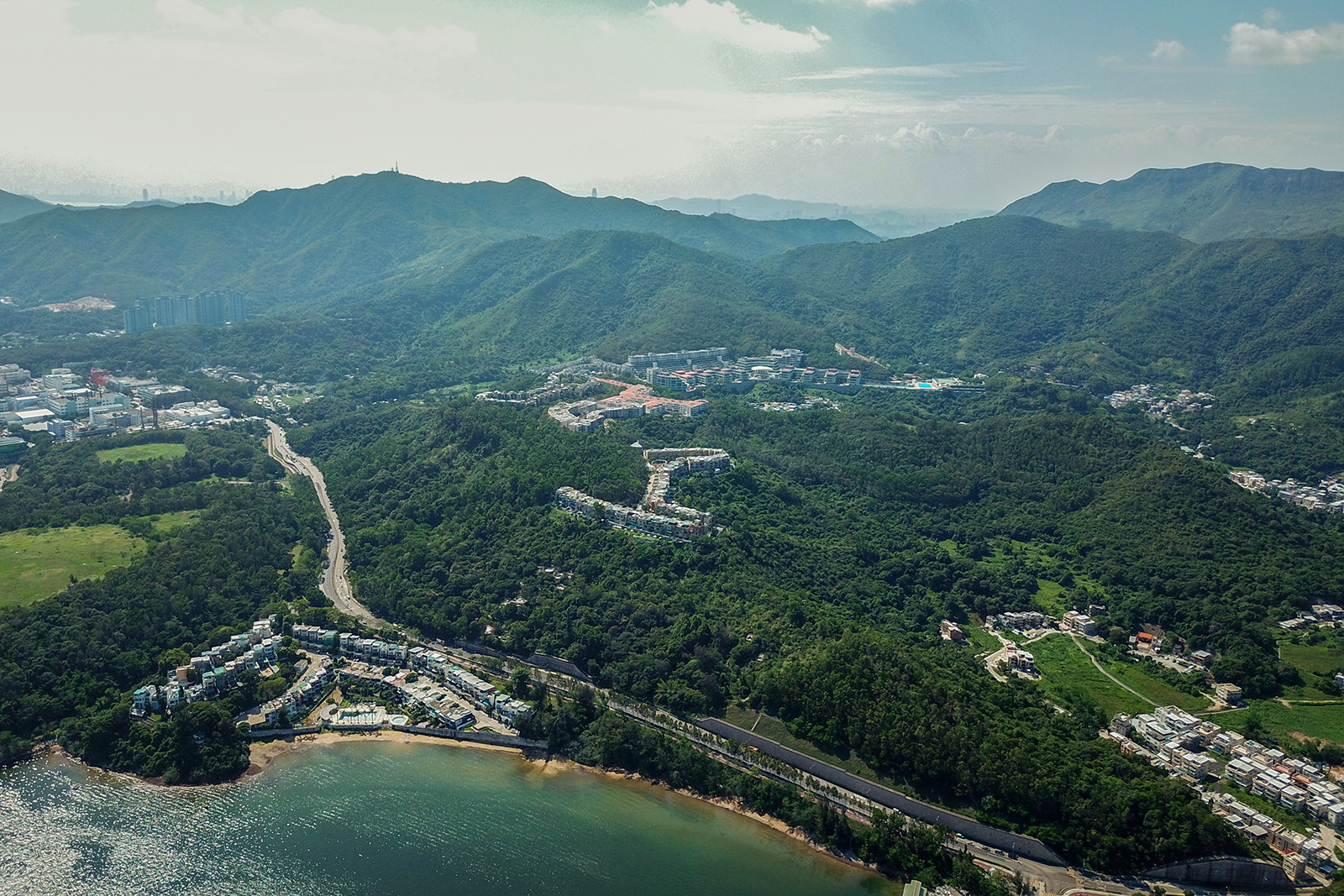
Aerial view of Tung Tsz.

Tung Tsz (Chinese: 洞梓), sometimes transliterated as Tung Tsai, is an area near Shuen Wan (Plover Cove) in the Tai Po District of the New Territories, Hong Kong, under the hills of Pat Sin Leng. The area is mainly rural and has a few villages. The campus of The Education University of Hong Kong and the campsite of Tung Tsz Scout Centre for The Scout Association of Hong Kong are also located in the area.

Tung Tsz Road goes through the village connected by Ting Kok Road.

== Administration ==
Tseng Tau, including A Shan and Tung Tsz, is a recognized village under the New Territories Small House Policy. For electoral purposes, Tung Tsz is part of the Shuen Wan constituency of the Tai Po District Council. It was formerly represented by So Tat-leung, who was elected in the local elections until October 2021.

== History ==
At the time of the 1911 census, the population of Tung Tsai was 43. The number of males was 14.

== See also ==
- Tsz Shan Monastery
