= Sotoba Komachi =

Noh play by Kan'ami Kiyotsugu

Sotoba Komachi is a Noh play written by Kan'ami, and is one of the most compelling and best-known of the type.

== Plot and themes ==
Much of the strength of the play derives from the variety provided by the three main and distinct sections: lament for lost beauty; witty religious debate; and ghostly possession.

The play begins with an encounter between two priests and an old beggar-woman, lamenting how she was “lovelier than the petals of the wild-rose open-stretched / In the hour before its fall. / But now I am grown loathsome even to sluts”. She later admits that she is the famed waka poet Ono no Komachi.

Because she is seated on a Buddhist stupa, a holy marker, she is challenged by the priests for creating bad karma, but in a witty debate uses Zen-like sophistries to defeat them: “Nothing is real. Between Buddha and Man is no distinction”.

The priests then lament in turn her loss of beauty; before in the final sequence she is possessed by the angry ghost of a former suitor, Shōshō of Fukakusa. He had been tasked with visiting Komachi for 100 nights in order to earn her love, but had died on the penultimate one; and his acting out of his cruelly thwarted struggles to win her love brings the play to a dramatic close, with Komachi then seeking for enlightenment and release.

== Later influence ==
- Bashō in his late renga ‘The Summer Moon’ wrote: “In this fleeting world no one can escape/ The destiny of that famed poetess Komachi”.
- Arthur Waley moved his future wife to tears by reading from his translation of the play: “Like a root-cut reed,/ Should the tide entice,/ I would come, I think; but now/ No wave asks; no stream stirs”.

== See also ==
- Kayoi Komachi
- Sekidera Komachi
- Sotoba Komachi (Mishima)
