= Kayoi Komachi =

Kayoi Komachi (通小町) or Shii no Shōshō (The Courtship of Komachi) is a Noh play by Kan'ami Kiyotsugu, about the legend of the famous waka poet Ono no Komachi.

Unlike Kan'ami's Sotoba Komachi, this play features the doomed lover Shōshō as the principal actor, and Komachi as the secondary or tsure.

== Plot ==
A meditating monk is offered daily provisions by a woman - the catalogue of her fruits and nuts being a feature of the play. The woman is revealed as the ghost of Komachi.

When the monk attempts to save her soul, the resentful presence of her former lover Shōshō interrupts the process. The ghost pair are encouraged to act out/relive the one hundred days of courtship Komachi had imposed on Shōshō, leading directly to his death, and are thereafter released from their bondage/attachment and set free.

== Literary associations ==
- Ezra Pound in his translation/adaptation of the play gave the two lovers a Dante-esque aura.
- Yukio Mishima saw the figure of Komachi in the play as representing the "eternal aspect of time... a single consistent beauty".

== See also ==
- Mugen Noh
- Sekidera Komachi
