= Cintāmaṇicakra =

Bodhisattva and manifestation of Avalokiteśvara

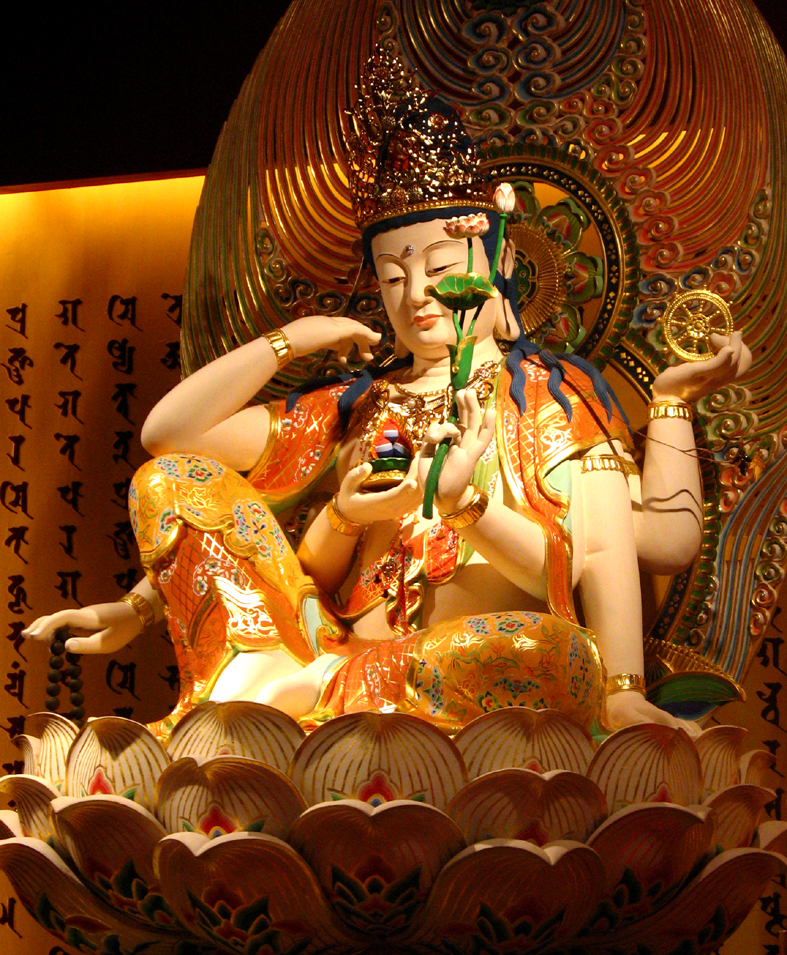
- Statue of Cintamanicakra (Chinese: Ruyilun Guanyin) in the Buddha Tooth Relic Temple and Museum in Chinatown in Singapore
- Sanskrit: चिन्तामणिचक्र (IAST) Cintāmaṇicakra
- Chinese: (Traditional) 如意輪觀音(菩薩) (Simplified) 如意轮观音(菩萨) (Pinyin: Rúyìlún Guānyīn (Púsà))
- Japanese: 如意輪観音(菩薩)(にょいりんかんのんぼさつ) (romaji: Nyoirin Kannon (Bosatsu))
- Korean: 여의륜관음(보살) (RR: Yeouiryun Gwaneum (Bosal))
- Tibetan: ཡིད་བཞིན་འཁོར་ལོ་ Wylie: Yid bzhin 'khor lo THL: Yizhin Khorlo
- Vietnamese: Như Ý Luân Quán Âm Bồ Tát

Information
- Venerated by: Mahāyāna, Vajrayāna

Cintāmaṇicakra (Sanskrit: चिन्तामणिचक्र; Chinese (Traditional): 如意輪觀音; Simplified: 如意轮观音; pinyin: Rúyìlún Guānyīn; Japanese: 如意輪観音, Nyoirin Kannon), also known as Cakravarticintāmaṇi (Sanskrit: चक्रवर्तिचिन्तामणि), is a bodhisattva and a manifestation of Avalokiteśvara (known in Chinese as Guanyin). He is counted as one of six different forms of the bodhisattva that represent salvation afforded to beings among the six realms of saṃsāra. Among these incarnations, Cintāmaṇicakra is believed to save those in the deva realm.

Cintāmaṇicakra is sometimes also referred to as Avalokiteśvara as Mahābrahmā the Profound (大梵深遠觀音; Ch. Dàfàn Shēnyuǎn Guānyīn; Jp. Daibon Jin'on Kannon).

== Iconography ==
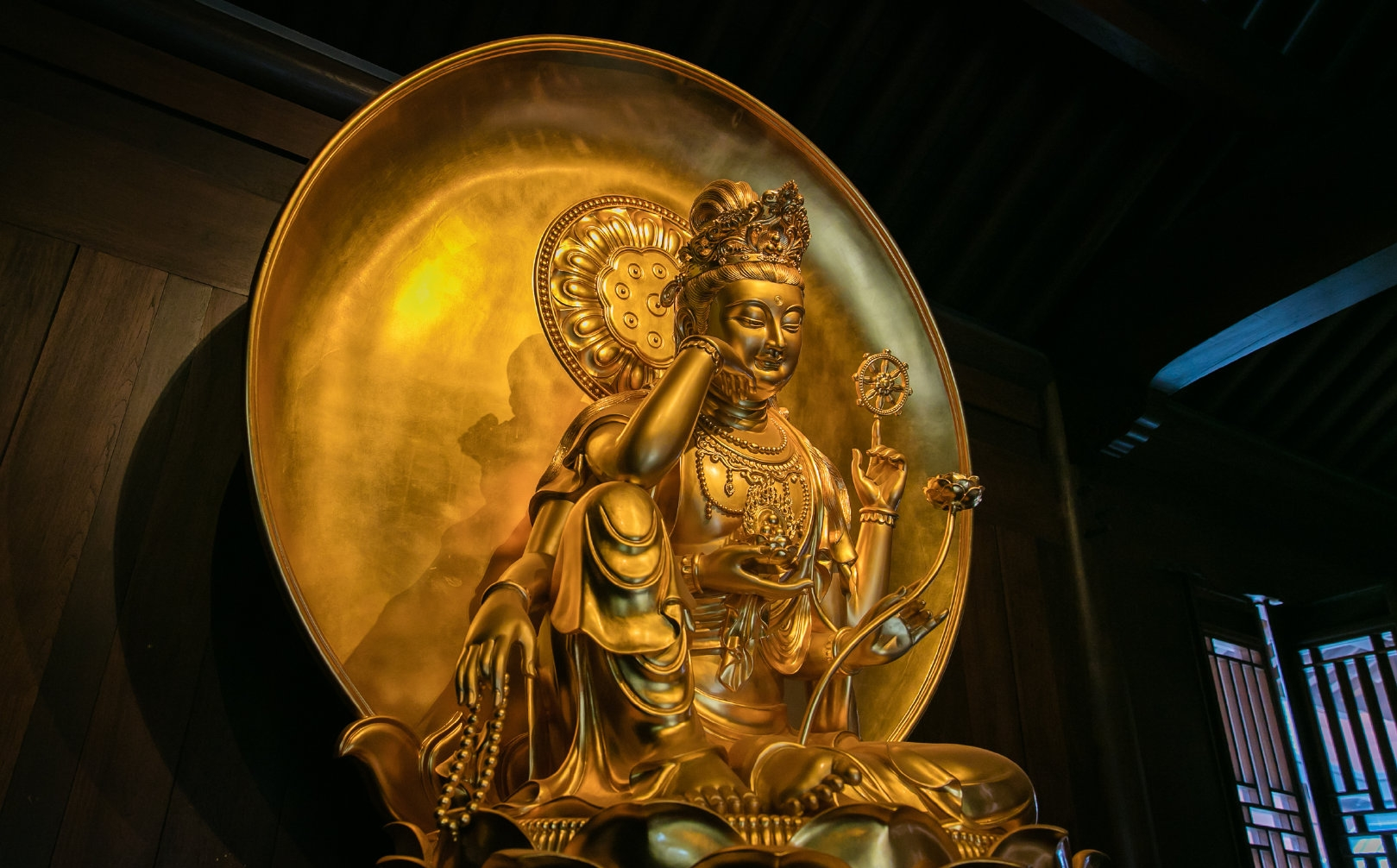
Six-armed Cintāmaṇicakra in the Hall of Great Compassion in Jade Buddha Temple, Shanghai, China

Cintāmaṇicakra is depicted as having anywhere from two to sixteen arms, with the two-armed and six-armed forms being the more common in Chinese and Japanese art.

In his six-armed form, Cintāmaṇicakra is commonly shown wearing a crown with an effigy of Amitābha Buddha and sitting in a "royal" position (mahārājalīlāsana, i.e. with his left leg tucked inwards and his right knee raised) atop a lotus on a rock protruding from the ocean - a symbol of Mount Potalaka, Avalokiteśvara's legendary abode. His first right hand touches his face in a pensive mudra, his second right hand holds a cintāmaṇi, and his third right hand holds prayer beads. His first left hand meanwhile touches the rock base he is sitting on, his second left hand holds a crimson lotus flower (padma), and the third left hand holds a Dharma wheel (cakra).

In two-armed images, he does not hold a jewel and he may be seated with his right leg crossed at the ankle over his left leg. This imagery is similar to that of the statue of Maitreya at Chūgū-ji in Nara, which has been mistakenly venerated as Cintāmaṇicakra. Another two-armed form exists where he holds a cintāmaṇi in his right hand and a water vase in his left hand. An example of this variation is the colossal Guanyin statue located in Tsz Shan Monastery in Hong Kong.

Cintāmaṇicakra may also be abstractly represented via his attributes or symbols (samaya; Ch. 三昧耶形, sānmèiyé xíng; Jp. sa(n)maya-gyō), the cintāmaṇi and the lotus flower.

== Dhāraṇī and mantras ==
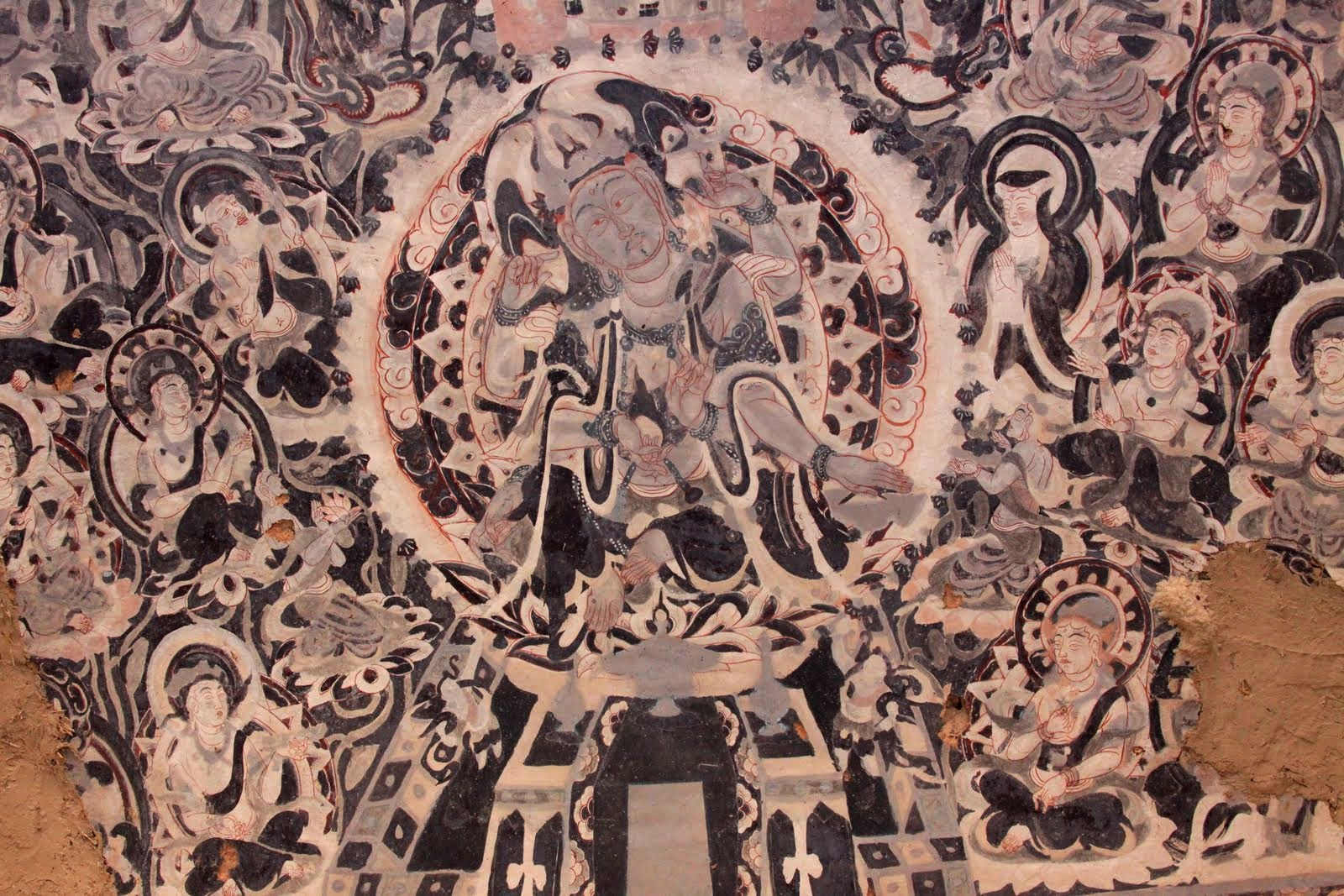
Song dynasty (960 - 1279) mural art depicting a mandala of Ruyilun Guanyin (Cintāmaṇicakra) in cave 231 of the Mogao Caves at Dunhuang, Gansu, China

=== Cintāmaṇicakra Dhāraṇī ===
Several mantras are associated with Cintāmaṇicakra. In Chinese Buddhism, the Cintāmaṇicakra Dhāraṇī or Cintāmaṇi Cakravarti Dhāraṇī (如意寶輪王陀羅尼; pinyin: Rúyì Bǎolún Wáng Tuóluóní) is reckoned as one of the Ten Small Mantras (十小咒; pinyin: Shíxiǎo zhòu), a collection of mantras and dhāraṇīs commonly recited in temples during morning liturgical services.

The dhāraṇī originates from the Cintāmaṇicakra Dhāraṇī Sutra, which was translated into Chinese by the monks Bodhiruci (如意輪陀羅尼經; pinyin: Rúyìlún tuóluóní jīng; Taishō Tripiṭaka 1080) and Yijing (佛說觀自在菩薩如意心陀羅尼咒經; pinyin: Fóshuō Guānzìzài Púsà rúyì xīn tuóluóní zhòu jīng; T. 1081).

In this sutra, Avalokitesvara states that this dharani "has great power and majesty, like the celestial wish-fulfilling tree, raining down great treasures upon the wise. Whatever is desired, all can be obtained, like the jewel of Maṇi. It can fulfill all the superior aspirations of all sentient beings."

The dhāraṇī is:

Bodhiruci's Sanskrit (IAST)	Chinese translation (Yijing)	Pinyin
Namo ratna-trayāya (Note: Yijing's text instead has: Namo buddhāya, namo dharmāya, namaḥ saṃghāya.); Nama Āryāvalokiteśvarāya bodhisattvāya mahāsattvāya mahākāruṇikāya tadyathā Oṃ cakravarti cintāmaṇi mahāpadme ru ru tiṣṭhat jvala ākarṣāya hūṃ phaṭ svāhā Oṃ padma cintāmaṇi jvala hūṃ Oṃ varada padme hūṃ	南謨佛馱耶 南謨達摩耶 南謨僧伽耶 南謨觀自在菩薩摩訶薩 具大悲心者 怛姪他 唵斫羯囉伐底 震多末尼謨訶 鉢蹬謎 嚕嚕嚕嚕 底瑟他 篅攞痾羯利沙也 吽發莎訶 菴鉢踏摩 震多末尼 篅攞吽 菴跋剌陀 鉢亶謎吽	Nāmó fótuóyé nāmó dámóyé nāmó sēngjiāyé Nāmó Guānzìzài púsà móhēsà jù dàbēixīnzhě dázhítā Ān zhuójiélàfádǐ zhènduōmòní móhē bōdēngmí lǔ lǔ lǔ lǔ dǐsètā shuòlà ājiélìshāyě hōng fā suōhē Ān bōtàmó zhènduōmòní shuòlà hōng Ān bálátuó bōdǎnmí hōng

The Buddha then praises the dhāraṇī spell in verse as follows:

Excellent, excellent, good man,

You are able to compassionately consider all sentient beings,

By expounding this wish-fulfilling dhāraṇī,

You deliver sentient beings, bringing them great superior benefits.

For those who believe and accept it, their sins will be eradicated,

And they will transcend the three realms and realize bodhi (enlightenment).

Wherever there are practitioners of this dhāraṇī,

Both worldly and transcendental wishes will be completely fulfilled.

Then Avalokitesvara offers some basic instructions on how to practice the dharani:

World-Honored One, if there are bhikṣus, bhikṣuṇīs, upāsakas, upāsikās, boys, or girls who seek great merit and blessings in this life, they should, day and night, diligently practice in accordance with the law and uphold this Cintāmaṇi-cakra Dhāraṇī mantra. There is no need to select auspicious days, months, or constellations, nor is it necessary to fast for one or two days, nor to bathe or establish an altar. They should wear their usual clothes, purify themselves with clear water, and conduct the ritual as usual. During day and night, they should reside in a clean room, sit facing east in the lotus posture, visualize the perfect form of Avalokiteśvara, whose body radiates great light like the rising sun and who is seated on a lotus flower. They should focus their mind on reciting without distraction, burn agarwood incense, and offer it with sincerity. They should reverently worship and make offerings of incense and flowers as they wish, ensuring these offerings are continuous. They should recite the dhāraṇī 1,080 times during each of the six periods of the day, without interruption. After completing 300,000 recitations, through the yogic practice of visualization and mantra recitation, all the heinous crimes committed in the past and present, such as the five uninterrupted sins and extremely severe karmic obstacles, will naturally be eradicated. They will have auspicious dreams, which will signify the elimination of their karmic sins. The sacred Avalokiteśvara will bless and protect them, and through this virtuous root, they will accomplish hundreds of thousands of tasks. By merely raising their mind and reciting, all their endeavors will be fully accomplished. There is no other divine power or mantra that can match the miraculous power of this Cintāmaṇi-cakra Dhāraṇī. Why is this? If someone is able to believe in and uphold this dhāraṇī, then all the karmic obstacles accumulated from committing the four major offenses, the five rebellious sins, and the ten evil acts, which would cause one to fall into the Avīci Hell, will all be eradicated....By maintaining this practice consistently without transgression, they will see the sacred Avalokiteśvara appear before them in a golden body, removing all defilements and karmic obstacles, and granting blessings with divine power.

=== Other mantras ===
The bījāmantra or seed syllable mantra used to symbolically represent Cintāmaṇicakra is hrīḥ (Siddhaṃ:; Devanagari: ह्रीः), which is the bija of the Lotus Buddha family.

The two shorter mantras found in the dharani are also commonly employed in the Japanese tradition on their own:

- Oṃ padme cintāmaṇi jvala hūṃ (Japanese pronunciation: On handomei shindamani jinbara un)
- Oṃ varada padme hūṃ (On barada handomei un)

== Gallery ==
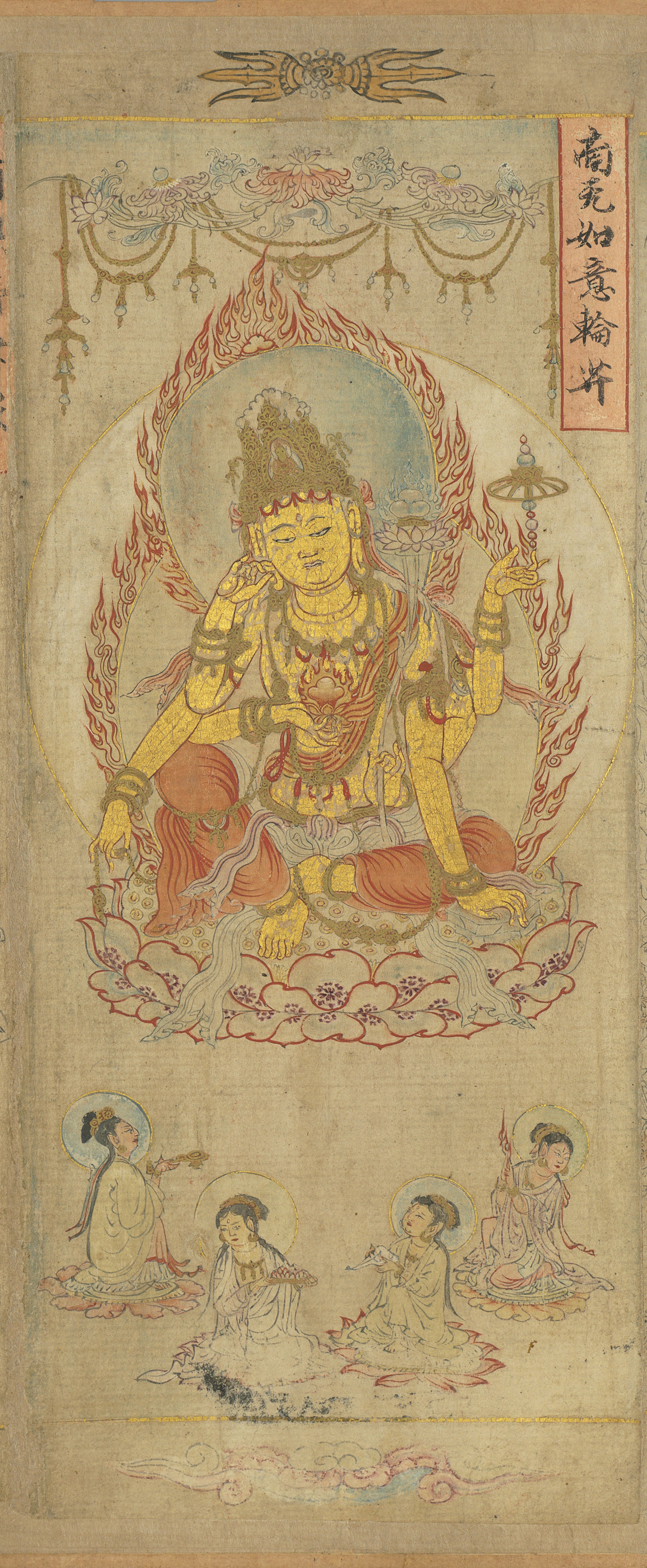
Painting of Cintāmaṇicakra by Zhang Shengwen (1163–1189), a painter from Dali Kingdom in modern-day Yunnan, China

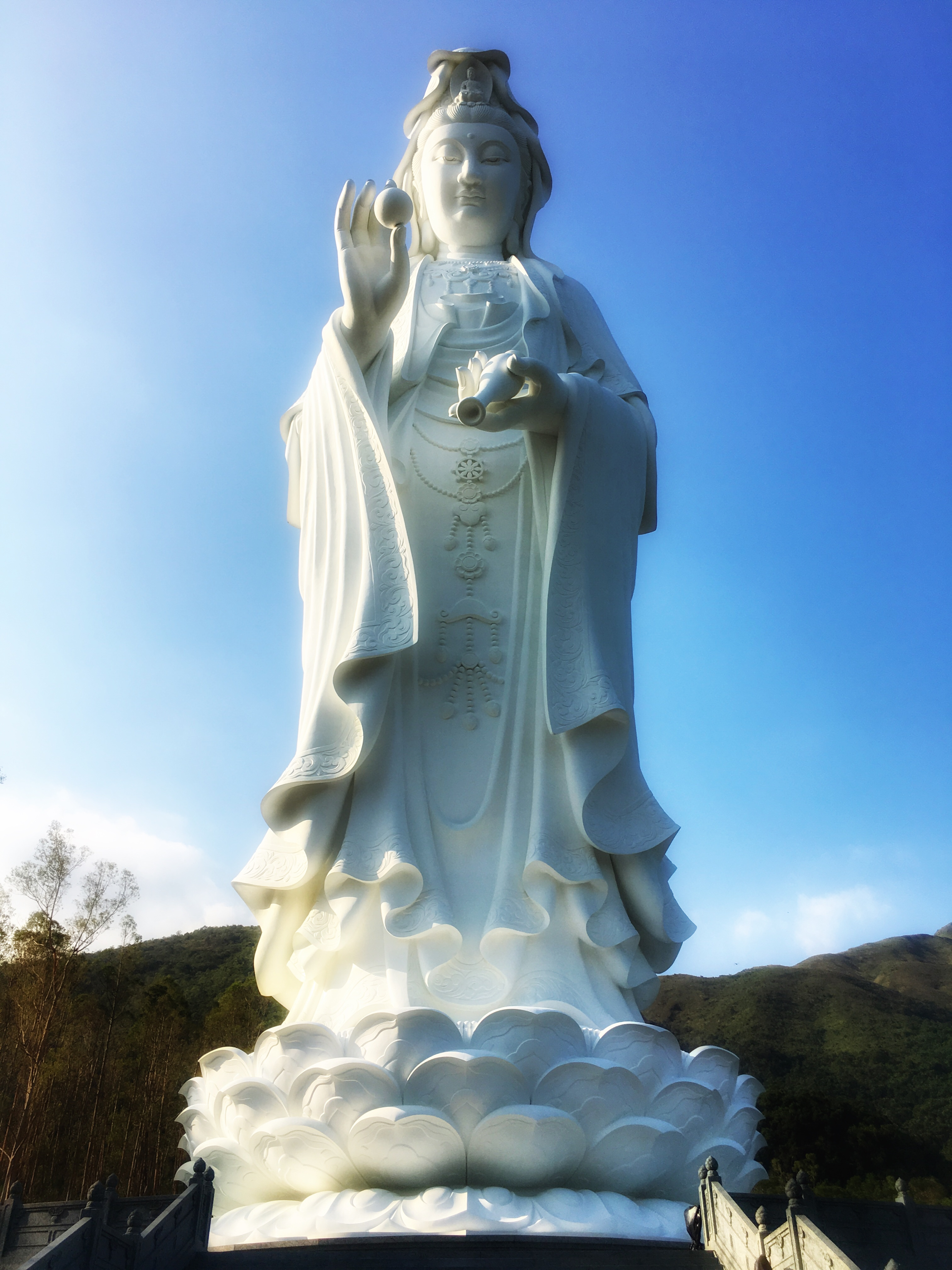
76 meter tall statue of the two-armed Cintāmaṇicakra in Tsz Shan Monastery in Hong Kong

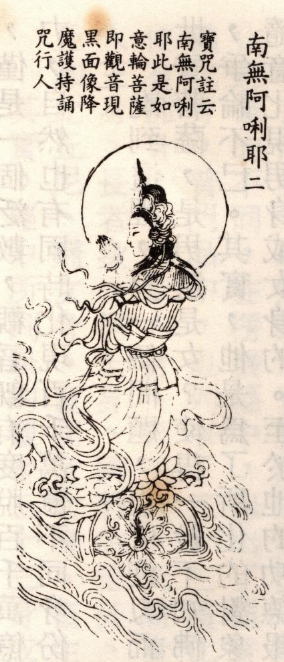
Picture of Cintāmaṇicakra in a Chinese Buddhist tract on the Nīlakaṇṭha Dhāraṇī associating her with a particular line of the dhāraṇī

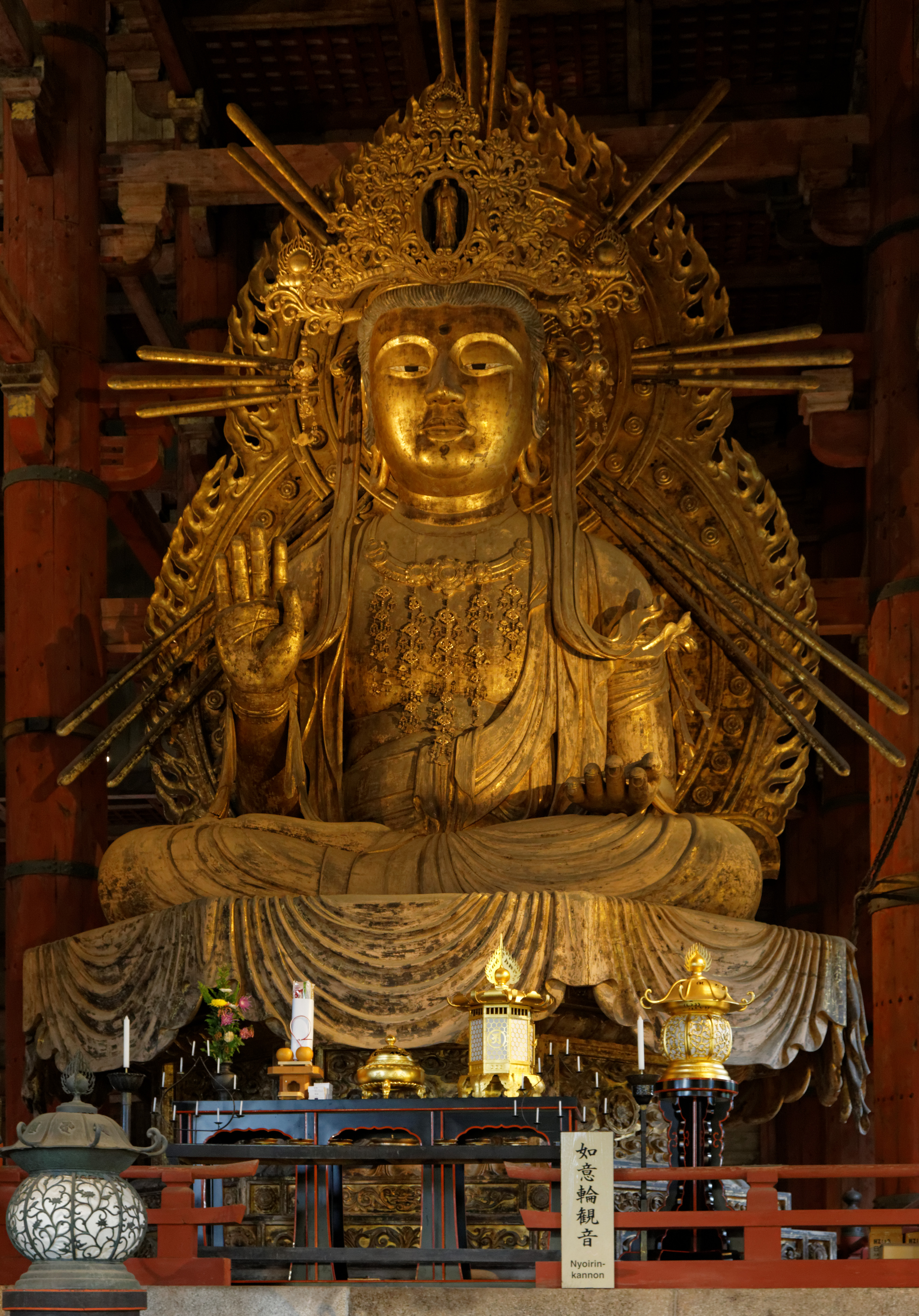
Two-armed Cintāmaṇicakra in Tōdai-ji, Nara, Nara Prefecture, Japan

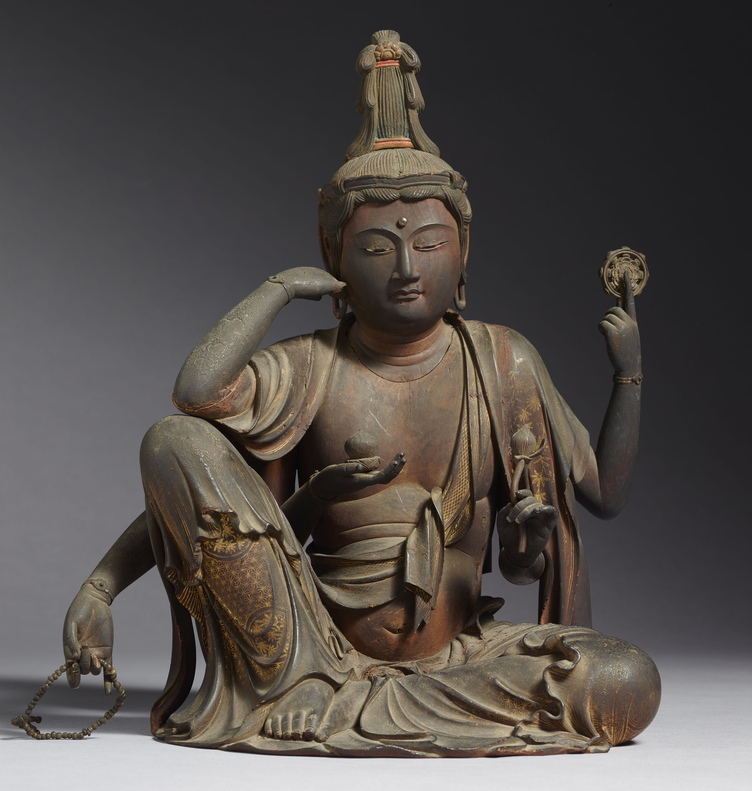
Cintāmaṇicakra, 1275, Kamakura period, Tokyo National Museum, Japan

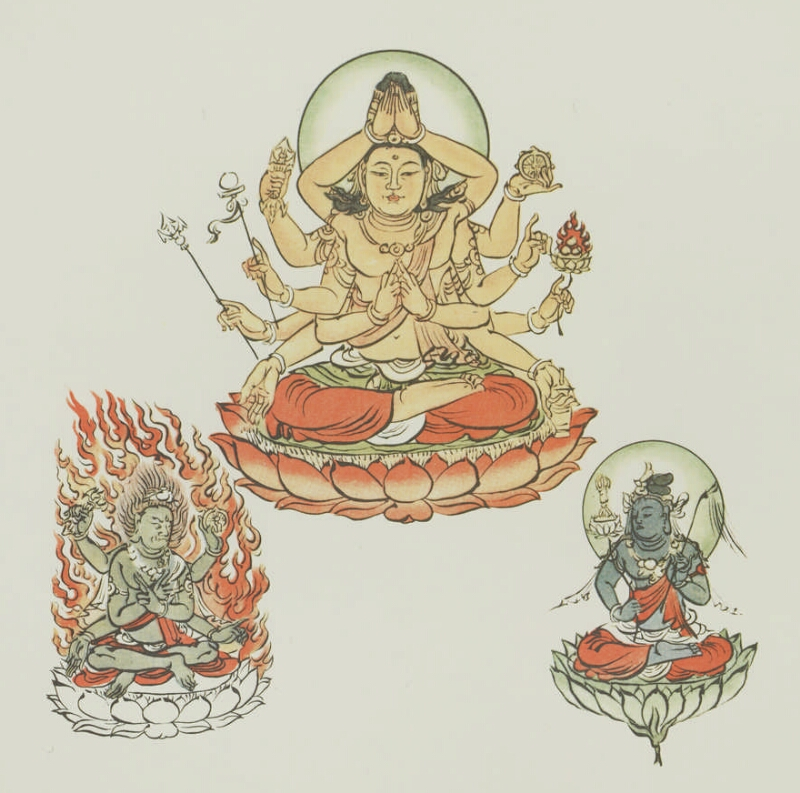
Twelve-armed Cintāmaṇicakra flanked by the Wisdom King Kuṇḍali and the bodhisattva Vajragarbha

== See also ==
- Cintamani
- Om mani padme hum - Another mantra associated with Guanyin (Avalokiteśvara)
- Ten Small Mantras - A collection of mantras that are recited in daily liturgical services in Chinese Buddhist temples, among other mantras.
- Ryōgen - Japanese Tendai monk popularly believed to be the incarnation of Cintāmaṇicakra
