= Sotoba Komachi (Mishima) =

Play by Yukio Mishima

Sotoba Komachi (卒塔婆小町) is one of the stories in Five Modern Noh Plays by Yukio Mishima. The original work was written by Kan'ami and was later reworked by Mishima Yukio for modern theatre. The kanji 卒塔婆 means stupa and小町 is the synonym of belle or beautiful woman. The story was written in 1952 and published in 1956. It was translated by Japanese literature expert Donald Keene into English in 1957. Sotoba Komachi is the third story of The Five Modern Noh Plays.

== In relation to Sotoba Komachi by Kan'ami ==
The original work, Sotoba Komachi written by Kan'ami, was originally a conversation between two priests and a 99-year-old lady at a Buddhist shrine. She later admits that she is Ono no Komachi (one of the six great waka poets in Heian period). She is then possessed by Captain Fukakusa (one of Komachi’s suitors) angry spirit and confesses to visiting Komachi for 99 nights in order to earn her love but lacking one and dying in agony. Mishima reworked the story and borrowed the characters (the old lady and Captain Fukakusa) from Kan'ami’s Sotoba Komachi.

== Plot ==
Mishima reset the story in a 1950s urban park. At the beginning of the story, five couples are sitting on the benches and embracing. A 99-year-old lady appears in the park to gather cigarette butts. A poet sees her and admonishes her for disturbing the lovers and for using a park bench that rightfully belongs to those in love. They debate life and love. The old lady confesses that when young she was a beautiful woman and was admired by Captain Fukakusa. Upon describing a dance she attended, she and the poet find themselves at the dance, many years earlier, in Rokumei Hall, a ballroom where many handsome men and beautiful women are dancing. Everyone in the ballroom recognizes the old woman as the beautiful Komachi and comment on her beauty.

The poet is surprised that the old, ugly, and wrinkled woman has become a beautiful young woman and falls in love with her. Despite Komachi’s warning that all the men who compliment her beauty die, he can’t stop himself. He professes his love for her because of her beauty. His last words before he dies are “I will meet you again, I am sure, in a hundred years, at the same place.” Everything returns to the present. Komachi is again an old woman counting the cigarette butts she has gathered. A policeman discovers the dead poet’s body. He asks Komachi if she knows anything about the body. She says that he tried to seduce her, but the policeman doesn’t believe her.

== Plays ==
Sotoba Komachi is one of the more popular plays among Mishima’s The Five Modern Noh Plays. The play has been performed in many countries besides Japan such as the United States, Malaysia, and France. A series of DVD adapted from The Five Modern Noh Plays was released to celebrate Mishima’s 90th birthday. Both Sotoba Komachi and Aoi no Ue were released on October 31, 2013. This is the first time for The Five Modern Noh Plays to be adapted in video format.
