= Ono no Komachi =

Japanese waka poet

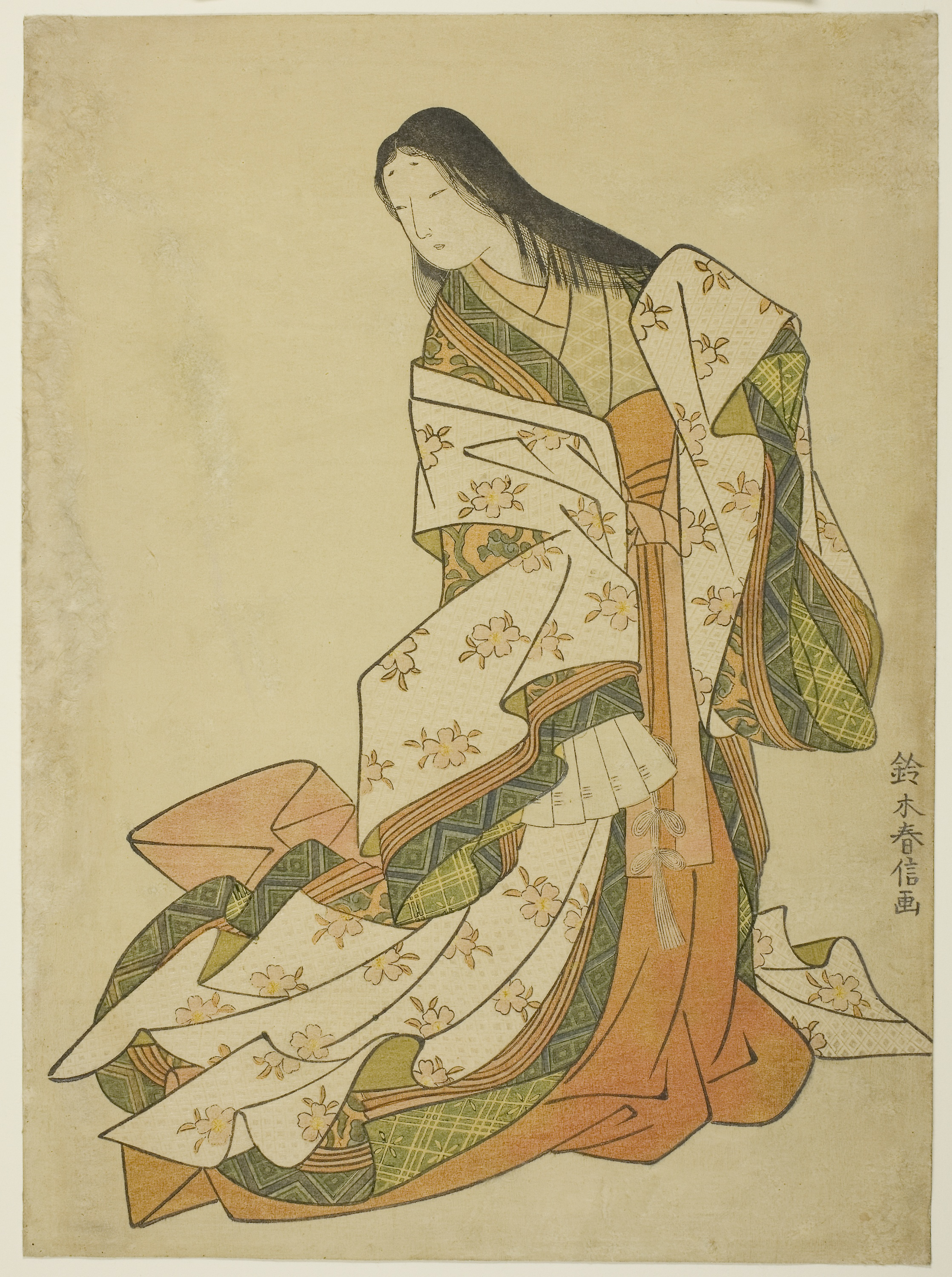
Ono no Komachi by Suzuki Harunobu

Ono no Komachi (小野 小町; Japanese pronunciation: [o.no no koꜜ.ma.tɕi], c. 825 – c. 900) was a Japanese waka poet, one of the Rokkasen—the six best waka poets of the early Heian period. She was renowned for her unusual beauty, and Komachi is today a synonym for feminine beauty in Japan. She also counts among the Thirty-six Poetry Immortals.

== Life ==
Almost nothing of Komachi's life is known for certain, save for the names of various men with whom she engaged in romantic affairs and whose poetry exchanges with her are preserved in the Kokin Wakashū. She was probably born between 820 and 830, and she was most active in composing poetry around the middle of the ninth century.

Extensive study has gone into trying to ascertain her place of birth, her family and so on, but without conclusive results. The Edo-period scholar Arai Hakuseki advanced the theory that there was more than one woman named Komachi and that the legends about her referred to different people. This theory was later expanded to conjecture that there were four "Komachis". It has been conjectured that she was a lady-of-the-bedchamber (皇位, kōi) in the service of Emperor Ninmyō, and when the latter died in 850 she started relationships with other men.

According to one tradition, she was born in what is now Akita Prefecture, daughter of Yoshisada, Lord of Dewa. The Noh play Sotoba Komachi by Kan'ami describes her as "the daughter of Ono no Yoshizane, the governor of Dewa". Her social status is also uncertain. She may have been a low-ranking consort or a lady-in-waiting of an emperor.

The headnote to poem #938 in the Kokinshū implies she had some sort of connection to Fun'ya no Yasuhide.

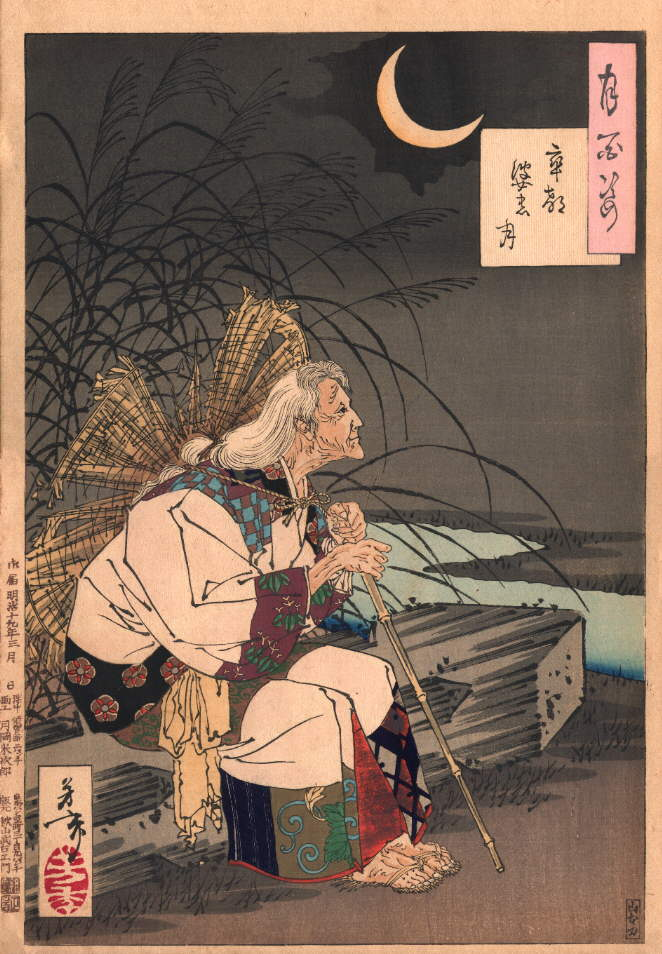
Ono no Komachi as an old woman, a woodcut by Tsukioka Yoshitoshi

=== Legends ===
Legends about Komachi (小町伝説/小町説話, Komachi-densetsu/Komachi-setsuwa) had developed as early as the eleventh century. They were later used extensively by the writers of Noh plays.

Stories abound of Komachi in love. One of the legends about her is that she was a lover of Ariwara no Narihira, her contemporary poet and also a member of the Rokkasen. It has been speculated that this legend may derive from the perhaps-accidental placement of one her poems next to one of Narihira's.

Another group of legends concern her cruel treatment of her lovers, notably Fukakusa no Shōshō, a high-ranking courtier. Komachi promised that if he visited her continuously for a hundred nights, then she would become his lover. He visited her every night, regardless of the weather, but died on the ninety-ninth night.

A third type of legend tells of an aged Komachi, forced to wander in ragged clothes, her beauty faded and her appearance so wretched that she is mocked by all around her, as punishment for her earlier mistreatment of her lovers. Yet another group of legends concern her death, her skull lying in a field; when the wind blows through the skull's eye socket the sound evokes Komachi's anguish.

A different categorization system for Komachi legends was given by Masako Nakano. She gives five groupings:

1. "tales of beauty" (美人説話, bijin-setsuwa)
2. "tales of sensuality" (好色説話, kōshoku-setsuwa)
3. "tales of haughtiness" (驕慢説話, kyōman-setsuwa)
4. "tales of poetry/poetic virtue" (歌人・歌徳説話, kajin/katoku-setsuwa)
5. "tales of downfall/bemoaning old age" (零落・衰老説話, reiraku/suirō-setsuwa)

== Poetry ==
Almost all of Komachi's extant poems are melancholic. Poet and translator Kenneth Rexroth and Ikuko Atsumi said of her poetry:

Her beauty may be legendary but her rank as one of the greatest erotic poets in any language is not. Her poems begin the extreme verbal complexity which distinguishes the poetry of the Kokinshū Anthology from the presentational immediacy of the Man'yōshū.

Most of her waka are about anxiety, solitude or passionate love. In the Kokinshū, all but one of her poems—the one that later appeared in the Hyakunin Isshu, quoted below—were classified as either "love" or "miscellaneous" poems. She is the only female poet referred to in the kana preface (仮名序, kana-jo) of the anthology, which describes her style as "containing naivety in old style but also delicacy".

One of her poems was included as #9 in Fujiwara no Teika's Ogura Hyakunin Isshu:

花の色は
うつりにけりな
いたづらに
わが身世にふる
ながめせしまに

Hana no iro wa
utsurinikeri na
itazura ni
wa ga mi yo ni furu
nagame seshi ma ni

A life in vain.
My looks, talents faded
like these cherry blossoms
paling in the endless rains
that I gaze out upon, alone.

The poem was originally included in the Kokinshū as #133, in the section dedicated to seasonal (spring) poetry. The poem is filled with many layers of significance, with almost every word carrying more than one meaning. It was the subject of a short essay appended to Peter McMillan's translation of the Ogura Hyakunin Isshu.

In his Seeds in the Heart, translator, critic and literary historian Donald Keene said that "[t]he intensity of emotion expressed in [her] poetry not only was without precedent but would rarely be encountered in later years. […] Komachi's poetry, however extravagant in expression, always seems sincere." He also praised her poetry along with that of the other poets of the “dark age” of waka in the ninth century in the following terms:

The passionate accents of the waka of Komachi and Narihira would never be surpassed, and the poetry as a whole is of such charm as to make the appearance of the Kokinshū seem less a brilliant dawn after a dark night than the culmination of a steady enhancement of the expressive powers of the most typical Japanese poetic art.

== Legacy ==
The many legends about her have made her the best-known of the Rokkasen in modern times. Until relatively recently, when the title "Miss XYZ" became common in Japan, the woman considered most beautiful in such-and-such town or region would be dubbed "XYZ Komachi". She and her contemporary Ariwara no Narihira are considered archetypes of female and male beauty, respectively, and both feature heavily in later literary works, particularly Noh plays.

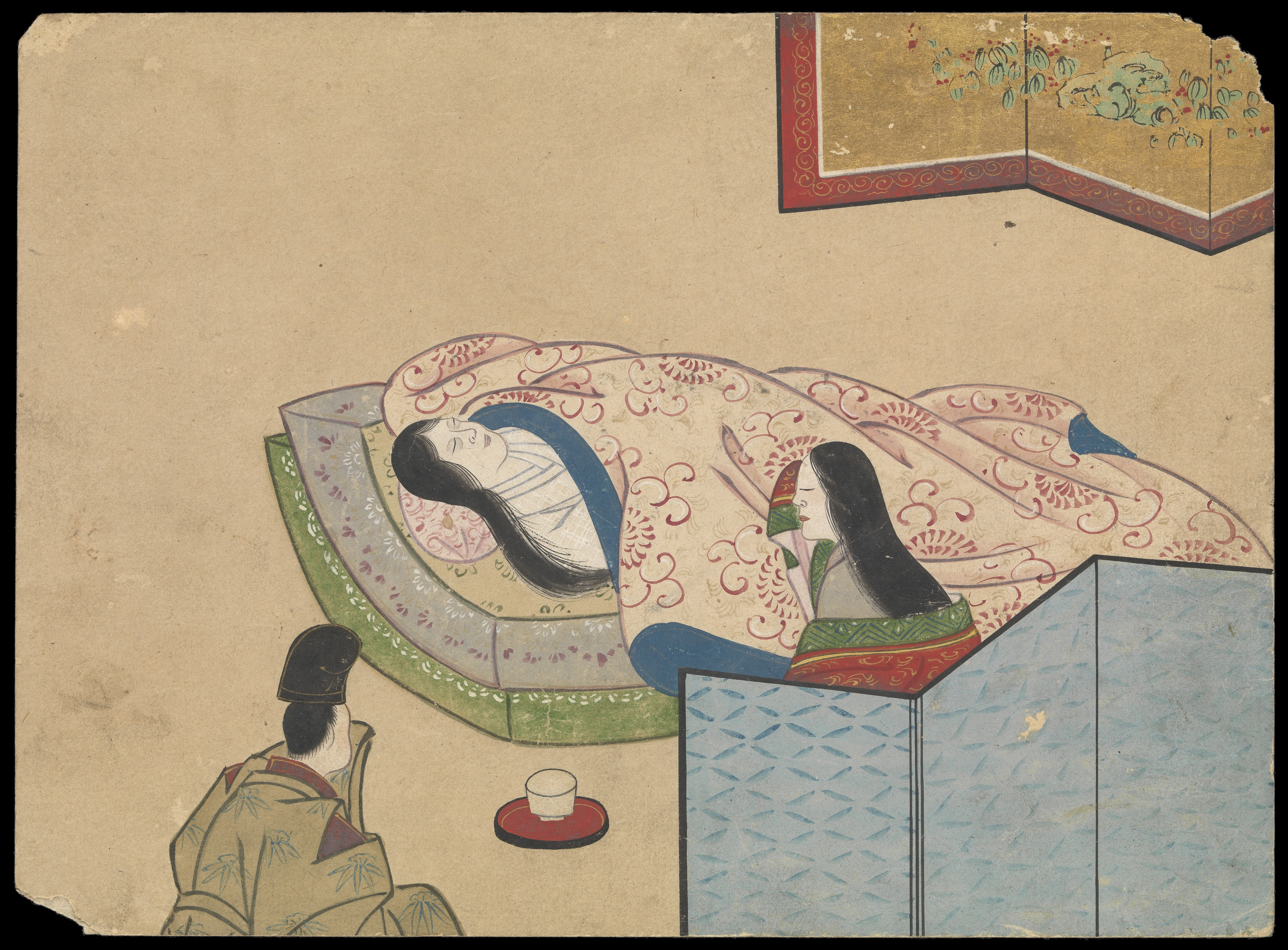
Komachi on her deathbed at the beginning of the death of a noble lady and the decay of her body

Komachi features frequently in later-period literature, including five Noh plays: Sotoba Komachi, Sekidera Komachi, Ōmu Komachi, Sōshi Arai Komachi and Kayoi Komachi. These works tend to focus on her talent for waka and her love affairs and the vanity of a life spent indulging in romantic liaisons. Komachi's old age is also frequently portrayed: when she has lost her beauty, has been abandoned by her former lovers, and now regrets her life, wandering around as a lonely beggar woman — albeit still appreciated by young admirers of her poetry. This fictional description is influenced by Buddhist thought and there may be no factual resemblance between it and the historical reality. Komachi is also a frequent subject of Buddhist kusōzu paintings, which depict her dead body in successive stages of decay to emphasize transience.

Mishima Yukio reworked Sotoba Komachi for the modern theater, publishing his version in January 1952. It was first performed the following month. The basic plot (the age-worn former beauty encounters a young poet and relates some of her life's story, which causes him to fall in love with her, with fatal results) is retained, but the action takes place in a public park, with flashbacks to the salons and ballrooms of Meiji-era Japan. An English translation by Donald Keene was published in 1967.

The play Three Poets by playwright Romulus Linney includes a one act story about Komachi the poet.

In her honor, the Akita Shinkansen is named Komachi. A variety of rice, Akita Komachi, also bears her name.

== Gallery ==
Ono no Komachi image gallery

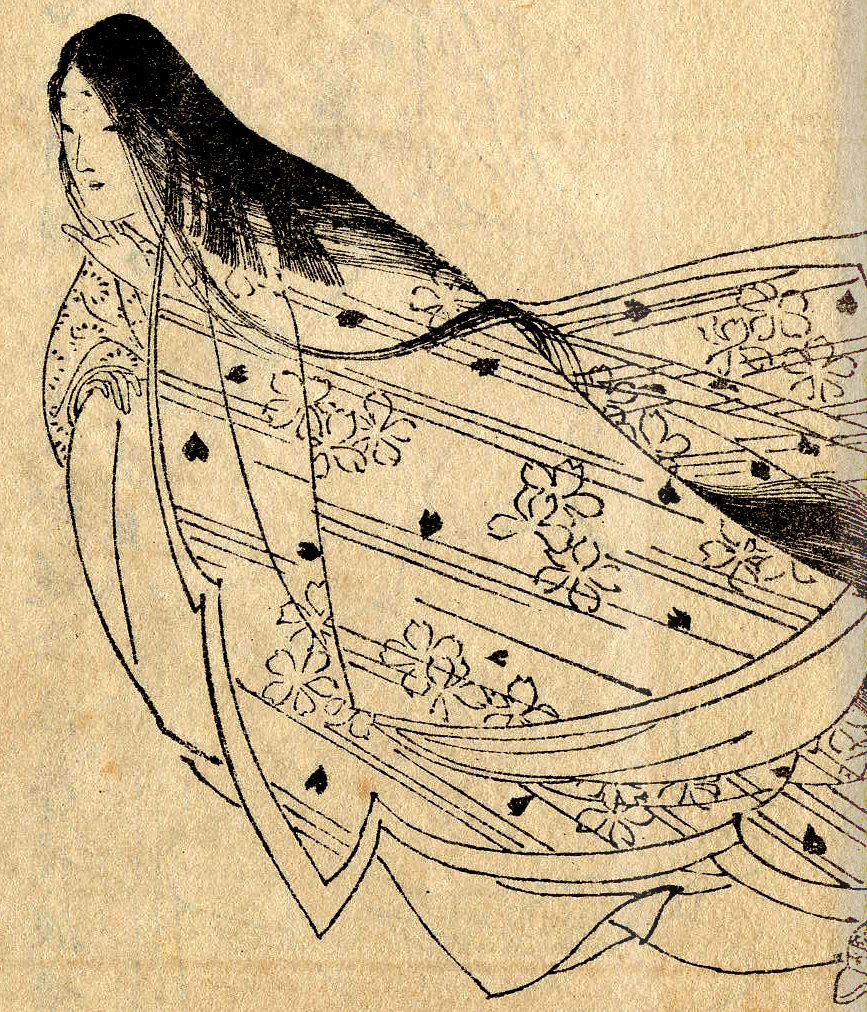
Ono no Komachi drawn by Kikuchi Yōsai

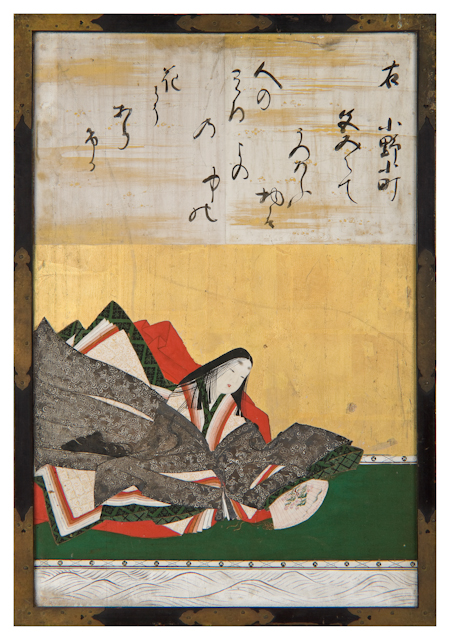
Ono no Komachi by Kanō Tan'yū, 1648

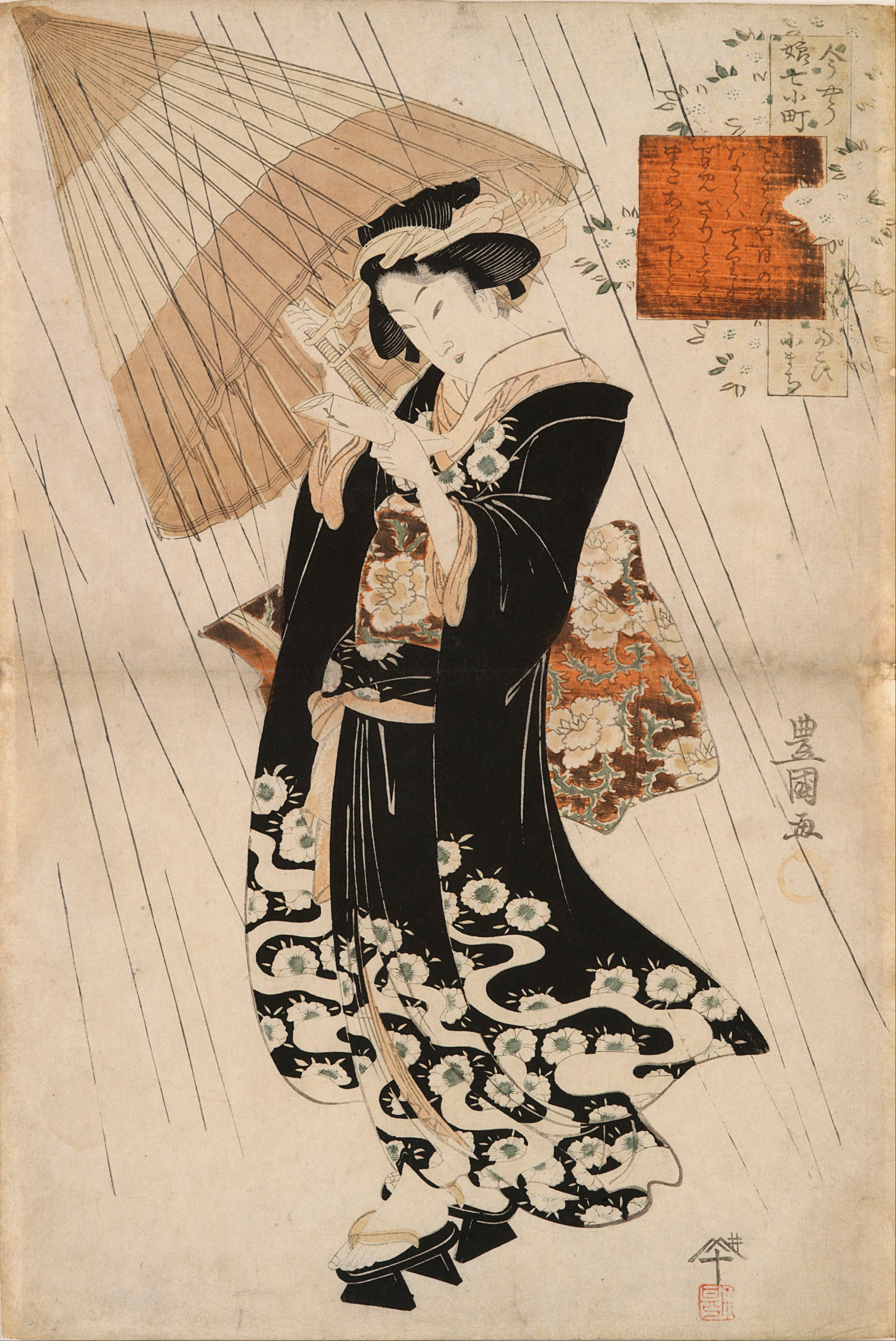
The poetess Ono-no Komachi in the rain

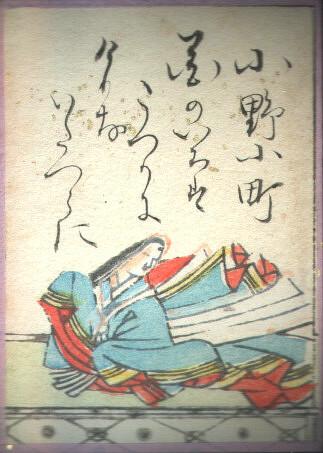
Ono no Komachi, from the Ogura Hyakunin Isshu.

== Cited works ==
- Arimoto, Nobuko (25 December 1985). "Mishima Yukio "Sotoba Komachi" Ron: Shigeki no Kokoromi". Kindai Bungaku Shiron (in Japanese). 23 (1). Hiroshima University (Hiroshima Daigaku Kindai Bungaku Kenkyūkai): 49–60.
- Hirshfield, Jane; Aratani, Mariko (1990). The Ink Dark Moon: Love Poems by Ono no Komachi and Izumi Shikibu, Women of the Ancient Court of Japan. New York: Vintage Books. ISBN 0-679-72958-5.
- Katagiri, Yōichi (1975). Ono no Komachi Tsuiseki (in Japanese). Tokyo: Kasama Shoin.
  - Katagiri, Yōichi (2015). Shinsō-ban: Ono no Komachi Tsuiseki. Tokyo: Kasama Shoin. ISBN 978-4-305-70781-9.
- Katagiri Yōichi 2009 (2nd ed.; 1st ed. 2005). Kokin Wakashū. Tokyo: Kasama Shoin.
- Keene, Donald (1970). Twenty Plays of the Nō Theater. New York: Columbia University Press. ISBN 0-231-03454-7.
- Keene, Donald (1999). A History of Japanese Literature, Vol. 1: Seeds in the Heart — Japanese Literature from Earliest Times to the Late Sixteenth Century. New York: Columbia University Press. ISBN 978-0-231-11441-7.
- McMillan, Peter (2010) [2008]. One Hundred Poets, One Poem Each: a translation of the Ogura Hyakunin Isshu. ISBN 978-0-231-14399-8.
- Nakano, Masako (2004), "Ono no Komachi", in Tanaka, Noboru; Yamamoto, Tokurō (eds.), Heian Bungaku Kenkyū Handobukku (in Japanese), Tokyo: Izumi Shoin, pp. 14–15, ISBN 978-4-7576-0260-1
- Rexroth, Kenneth; Atsumi, Ikuko (1977). Woman poets of Japan. New York: New Directions Pub. Corp. ISBN 0-8112-0820-6.
- Suzuki, Hideo; Yamaguchi, Shin'ichi; Yoda, Yasushi (2009) [1997]. Genshoku: Ogura Hyakunin Isshu. Tokyo: Bun'eidō.
