= Sekidera Komachi =

関寺小町
- English title: Komachi at Sekidera
- Written by: Zeami Motokiyo
- Category: 3rd — katsura mono
- Style: furyū
- Characters: shite Ono no Komachi waki Abbot of Sekidera wakizure priests kokata child
- Place: Sekidera, Ōmi Province
- Time: Autumn; 7th day of 7th month
- Sources: Kokin Wakashū

Sekidera Komachi (関寺小町, Komachi at Sekidera) is a famous Noh play of the third category (plays about women) by Zeami Motokiyo. Its central character is a real life figure, the great 9th-century poet Ono no Komachi, who was also famed for her beauty.

The play depicts Komachi at the end of her life, when her beauty has faded and she is living in great poverty. On the evening of the seventh day of the seventh month, during the Festival of Stars, the Abbot of Sekidera visits her in her hut, taking two priests and a child, so that they can hear her talk about poetry. During the course of their conversation, the abbot realizes her identity and is astonished and delighted. He invites her to come with them to the festival, but she declines.

The child dances part of a gagaku dance for her, the Manzairaku. Inspired, she starts to dance herself, and continues to do so until dawn. In the dawn light she ponders the transience of life, and her irrational shame at what she has become, which Zeami tragically underscores by setting the action during the Tanabata festival, which celebrates two young lovers.

The temple of Sekidera still exists; it is now called Chōanji, and can be found in the city of Ōtsu, Shiga.
