= Ting Kok Road =

Road in Tai Po District, Hong Kong

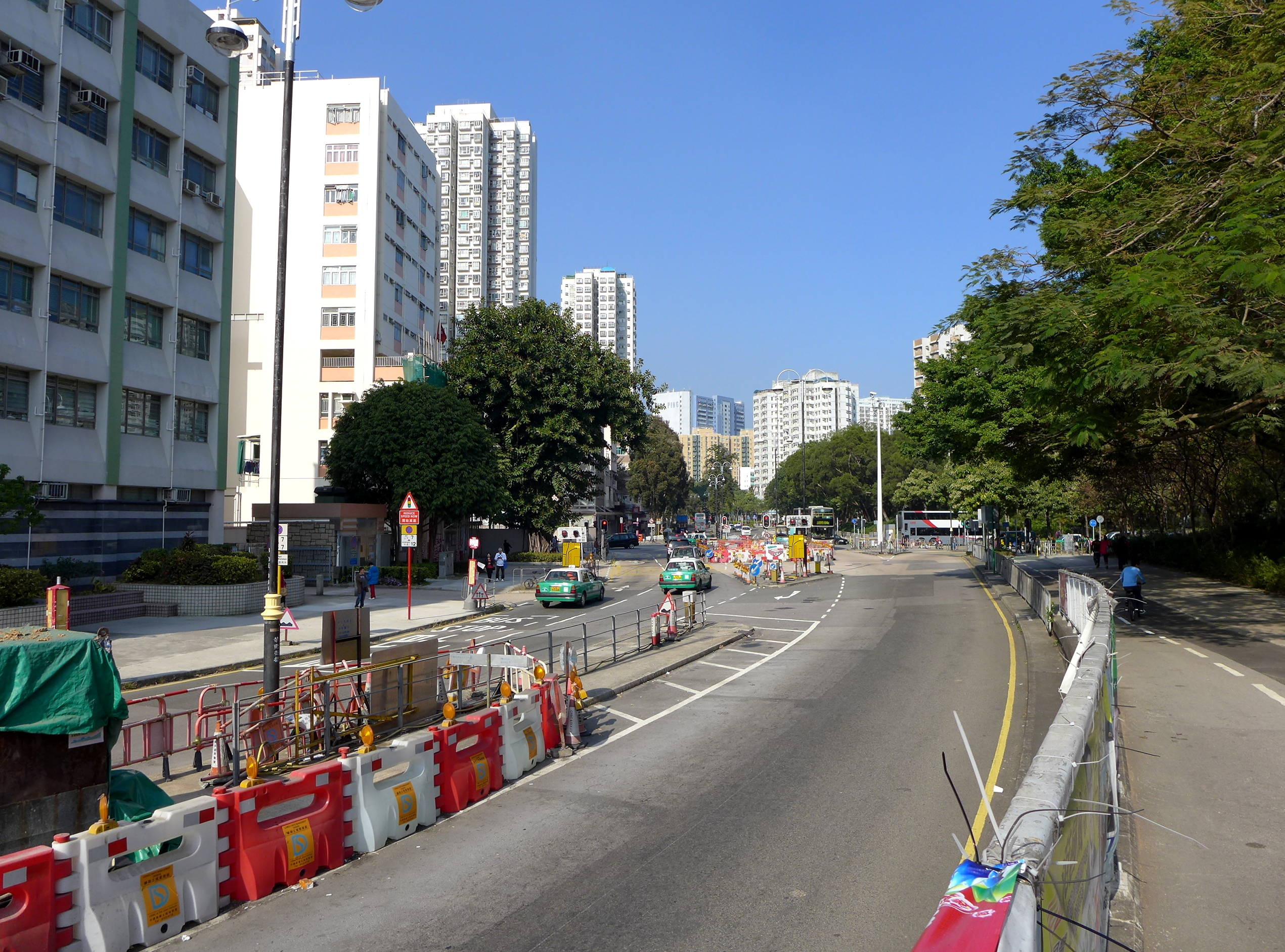
- Ting Kok Road near the Tai Po Government Offices (2014)

- Map of Ting Kok Road, with the route shown in red
- Native name: 汀角路
- Former name: Named on 3 April 1970, Government Notification No. 713 in the Government Gazette of 3 April 1970; Government Notice No. 1502 of 6 March 2009
- Type: Dual direction (2–6 lanes)
- Length: 9.7 km (6.0 mi)
- Restrictions: Speed limit of 50 / 70 km/h
- Location: Tai Po District, Hong Kong
- Coordinates: 22.4600033°N 114.2009489°E
- From: Mei Wu Road / Bride's Pool Road, Tai Mei Tuk
- To: Po Nga Road / Kwong Fuk Road, Tai Wo

Construction
- Construction start: 1952–1957
- Completed: 1955 (Tai Po Old Market to Ha Hang section); 1956 (Ha Hang to Shuen Wan section); 1959 (Shuen Wan to Ting Kok section); 1960 (Ting Kok to Tai Mei Tuk section)

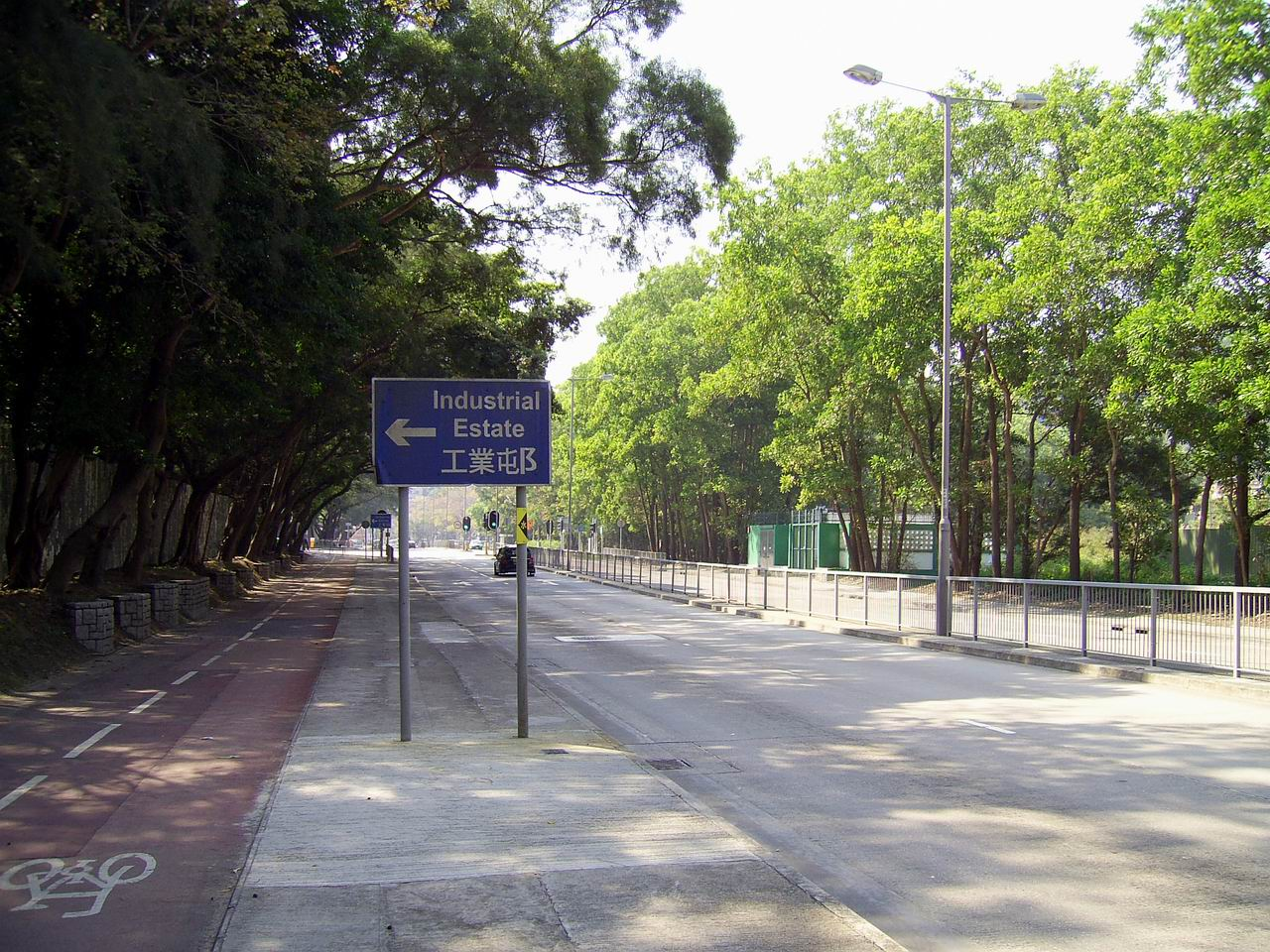
Ting Kok Road near Tai Po Industrial Estate

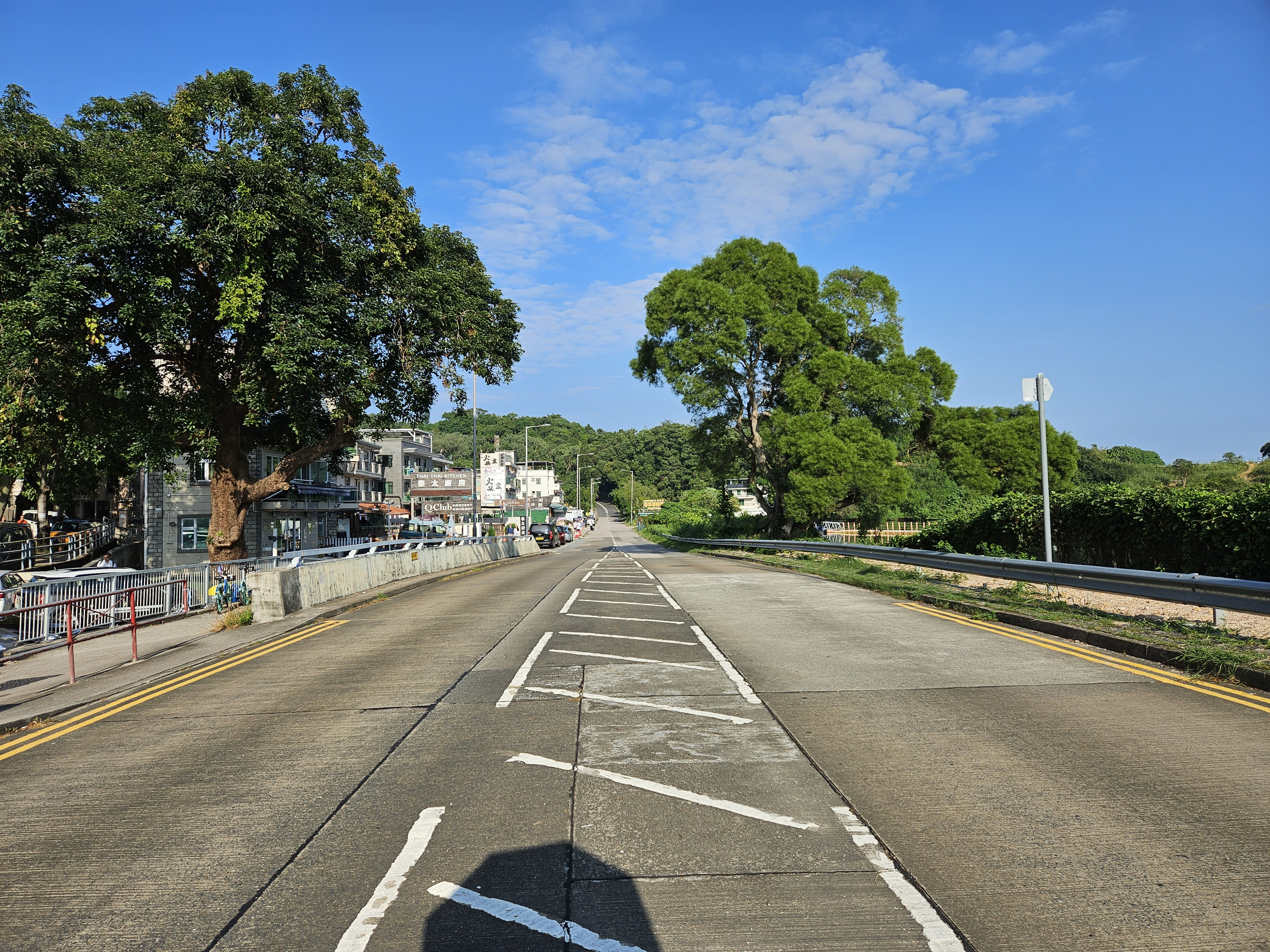
Ting Kok Road near Tai Mei Tuk

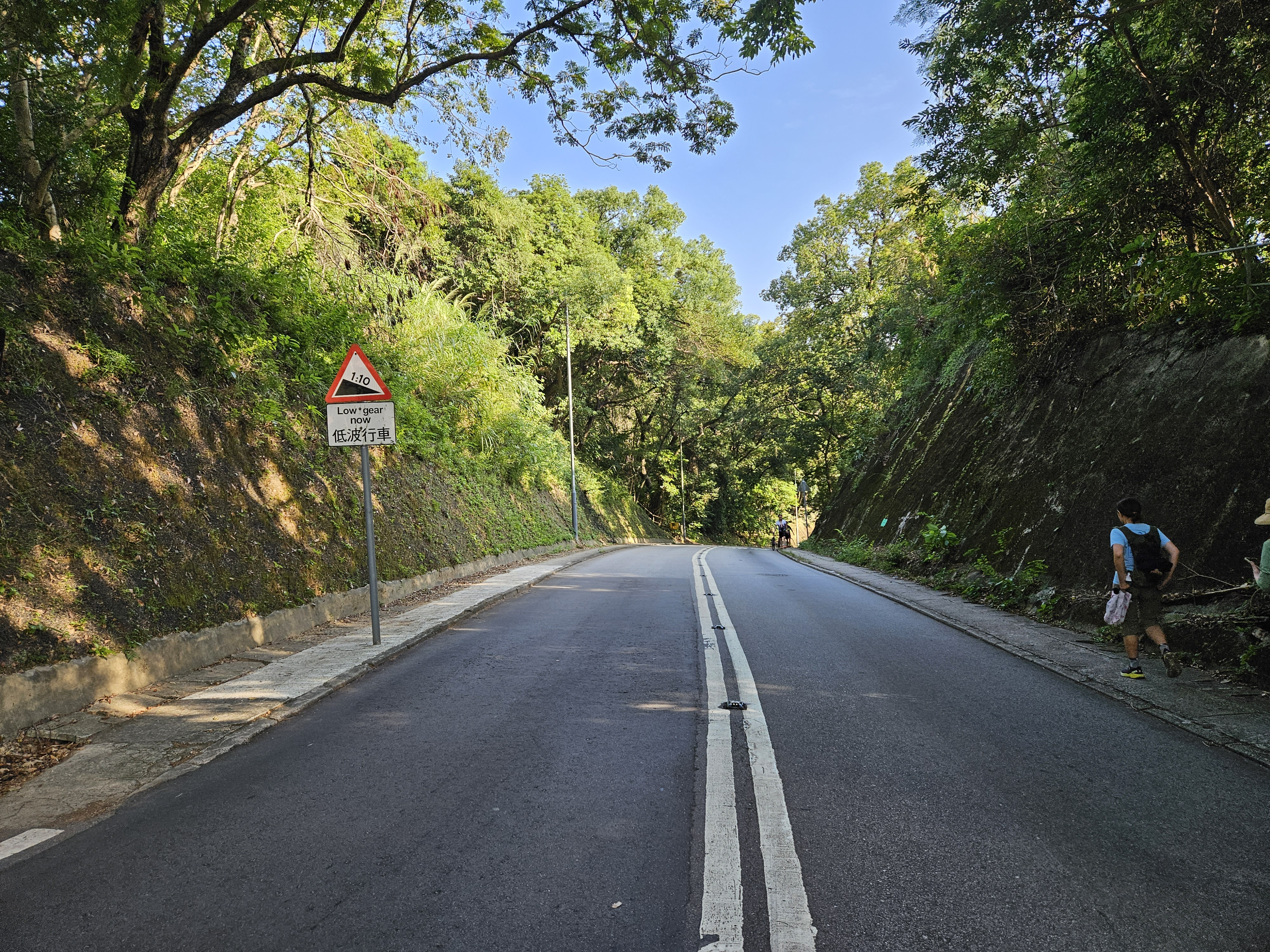
Ting Kok Road near Bride's Pool Road

Ting Kok Road (Chinese: 汀角路) is a major road in Tai Po District, New Territories, Hong Kong. Its eastern end is east of Tai Mei Tuk, at the Tai Mei Tuk Management Centre of Plover Cove Country Park, where it connects with Bride's Pool Road. It runs through the villages along Tai Mei Tuk to Tai Po New Town and Tai Wo, where it connects with Kwong Fuk Road and Po Nga Road. Ting Kok Road is about 9.7 kilometres (6.0 mi) long. It was completed in stages as early as the 1950s. It marked the coastline of Tai Po New Town before land reclamation and is one of the early roads in Tai Po. Most of Ting Kok Road has a speed limit of 50 km/h (31 mph), but the section between Nam Wan Road and Sam Mun Tsai has a speed limit of 70 km/h (43 mph).

== History ==
In the 1950s, the colonial Hong Kong government built a number of roads to improve transport in the New Territories, including Lam Kam Road, Fan Kam Road, Route Twisk, and a road connecting Tai Po Old Market with Sha Tau Kok. Construction of the road began in November 1952, starting with the section from Tai Po to Ting Kok. However, owing to insufficient funding, construction was suspended in July 1954, and only the section from Tai Po to Shuen Wan could be completed. The authorities also had to purchase some land from the villages along the route to build the road.

In 1955, the section of the "Tai Po to Sha Tau Kok Road" between Tai Po Old Market and Ha Hang was the first to open to traffic, while the eastern section had been built from Sha Tau Kok Road to Kuk Po. In January of the following year, the western section was extended to Shuen Wan, and the entire "Tai Po to Sha Tau Kok Road" was named "Ting Kok Road". Work on the section between Ting Kok and Tai Mei Tuk began in November 1957, and the section from Shuen Wan to Ting Kok opened first in 1959. The section from Ting Kok to Tai Mei Tuk, as well as the section from Sha Tau Kok Road to Luk Keng, opened to traffic at the end of 1960.

In 1961, in connection with the construction of the Plover Cove Reservoir, the government began planning to widen the section of Ting Kok Road between Tai Po Old Market and Ting Kok to a two-lane, two-way road. The widening works formally began in 1963, during which some farmland along the route had to be resumed, and were completed in 1964.

On 3 April 1970, the government officially named the section of the "Tai Po to Sha Tau Kok Road" between Tai Po Old Market and Tai Mei Tuk as Ting Kok Road.

=== Improvement works ===
To cope with the traffic generated by the development of Tai Po Industrial Estate, the government began "Ting Kok Road Improvement – Stage I Phase I" in April 1990, partially widening the section of Ting Kok Road from the industrial estate to Oi Tak San Tsuen, as well as the cycle track from the industrial estate to Tai Mei Tuk. The cycle track part was completed first, on 30 July 1991, and the improvement works were completed in March 1994. As the section of Ting Kok Road between Shuen Wan and Tai Mei Tuk did not meet the road standards of the time, the authorities carried out "Ting Kok Road Improvement – Stage II" from mid-1998 at a cost of HK$268 million, widening and improving the approximately 3.5-kilometre (2.2 mi) section between Shuen Wan and Tai Mei Tuk together with the associated footpaths and cycle track. The works were completed in November 2001.

In May 2002, the government applied to the Legislative Council for HK$218.4 million to carry out "Ting Kok Road Improvement – Stage I Phase II", widening an approximately 1.8-kilometre (1.1 mi) section between Tai Po East Fire Station and Wong Yue Tan. The works were fully completed around 2005.

In recent years, a number of large residential developments (Mont Vert) and facilities (Tsz Shan Monastery) have been added in Shuen Wan and Fung Yuen, which are bound to increase the traffic load on Ting Kok Road. To improve traffic conditions on Ting Kok Road in the Kowloon-bound direction, the Transport Department implemented a traffic management measure in 2014 changing Tai Hung Street in Tai Po Industrial Estate from eastbound to westbound, providing an alternative Kowloon-bound route for Ting Kok Road. Lay-bys have also been progressively added along the Shuen Wan Hoi section of Ting Kok Road, in an effort to relieve the intermittent congestion on Ting Kok Road during peak hours. In addition, a 10-metre (33 ft) wide strip of land has been reserved along the Kowloon-bound side of Ting Kok Road near Fung Yuen Road, so that the junction can be widened in the future if necessary.

== Route ==
Ting Kok Road was built largely along the coastline of Tai Po before land reclamation. Its eastern end is at Tai Mei Tuk near Bride's Pool Road. It passes the villages of Ting Kok, Shuen Wan and Sam Mun Tsai before entering Tai Po Industrial Estate, and makes a 90-degree turn at the junction of Yuen Shin Road and Dai Fuk Street. It then passes Fu Shin Estate and the north side of Tai Po Centre before making another 90-degree turn at the junction with Ting Tai Road, ending at its junction with Kwong Fuk Road and .

=== Junctions ===
The entire road is in Tai Po District. Unnamed minor roads are not included in the following list of junctions.

Location	km	Junction	Notes
Shuen Wan	0.0	Mei Wu Road, Bride's Pool Road	Road continues north as part of Bride's Pool Road.
Shuen Wan	0.6	Sam Wo Road, Tai Mei Tuk Road	
Shuen Wan	0.9	Tai Po Lung Mei Road	
Shuen Wan	1.7	Shan Liu Road	
Shuen Wan	3.6	Tung Tsz Road	
Shuen Wan	3.9	Chim Uk Road	
Shuen Wan	4.7	Sam Mun Tsai Road	
Shuen Wan	5.9	Lo Fai Road	
Tai Po Industrial Estate	6.3	Dai Kwai Street	
Tai Po Industrial Estate	6.5	Ting Hing Road	
Tai Po Industrial Estate	7.2	Dai Fat Street	No left turn from westbound onto southbound Dai Fat Street.
Tai Po Industrial Estate	7.3	Fung Yuen Road	
Fu Shin / Fu Heng	7.7	Yuen Shin Road, Dai Fuk Street	
Fu Shin / Fu Heng	8.0	On Po Road	Left-in/left-out with westbound Ting Kok Road only.
Fu Shin / Fu Heng	8.4	Nam Wan Road, Chung Nga Road	
Fu Heng / Tai Yuen	8.6	On Cheung Road	Left-in/left-out with westbound Ting Kok Road only.
Fu Heng / Tai Yuen	8.6	Chung Nga Road	Left-in/left-out with eastbound Ting Kok Road only.
Fu Heng / Tai Yuen	9.1	Ting Tai Road, Ting Lai Road	
Tai Po Old Market	9.4	On Chee Road, Mei Sun Lane	
Tai Wo	9.5	Tai Po Tai Wo Road	
Tai Wo	9.7	Kwong Fuk Road, Po Nga Road	Road continues southwest as part of Po Nga Road.

== Current status ==
=== Annual average daily traffic ===
The following are the annual average daily traffic (AADT) figures for the sections of Ting Kok Road in 2021.

Section	AADT (vehicles)	Estimated	Road type
Bride's Pool Road to Tai Mei Tuk	1,460	No	Local distributor
Tai Mei Tuk to Dai Kwai Street	30,220	No	Rural road
Dai Kwai Street to Nam Wan Road	32,240	No	Primary distributor
Nam Wan Road to Tai Po Tai Wo Road	18,830	Yes	District distributor
Ting Tai Road to Tai Po Tai Wo Road	18,620	No	District distributor
Tai Po Tai Wo Road to Kwong Fuk Road	15,210	No	Local distributor

=== Speed limits ===
The speed limit on Ting Kok Road was originally 50 km/h (31 mph). On 1 January 2001, the government raised the speed limit on the section between Nam Wan Road and Dai Kwai Street to 70 km/h (43 mph). The section between Dai Kwai Street and Sam Mun Tsai, however, remained at 50 km/h after its widening was completed. Traffic queues formed every weekend and public holiday when many people visited Tai Mei Tuk for leisure, and the Tai Po District Council repeatedly asked the Transport Department to raise the limit on this section to 70 km/h, but the department did not do so. In 2007, the Transport Department decided to study raising the speed limit on this section of Ting Kok Road to 70 km/h, and at the same time planned to install a speed enforcement camera near the Shuen Wan golf course and a red light camera at the junction with Sam Mun Tsai Road. Eventually, from 18 May 2007, the government first raised the speed limit on the section between Dai Kwai Street and Nga King Garden to 70 km/h, and then on 29 July 2011 likewise raised the speed limit on the section between Nga King Garden and Sam Mun Tsai to 70 km/h, in response to the demands of local figures.

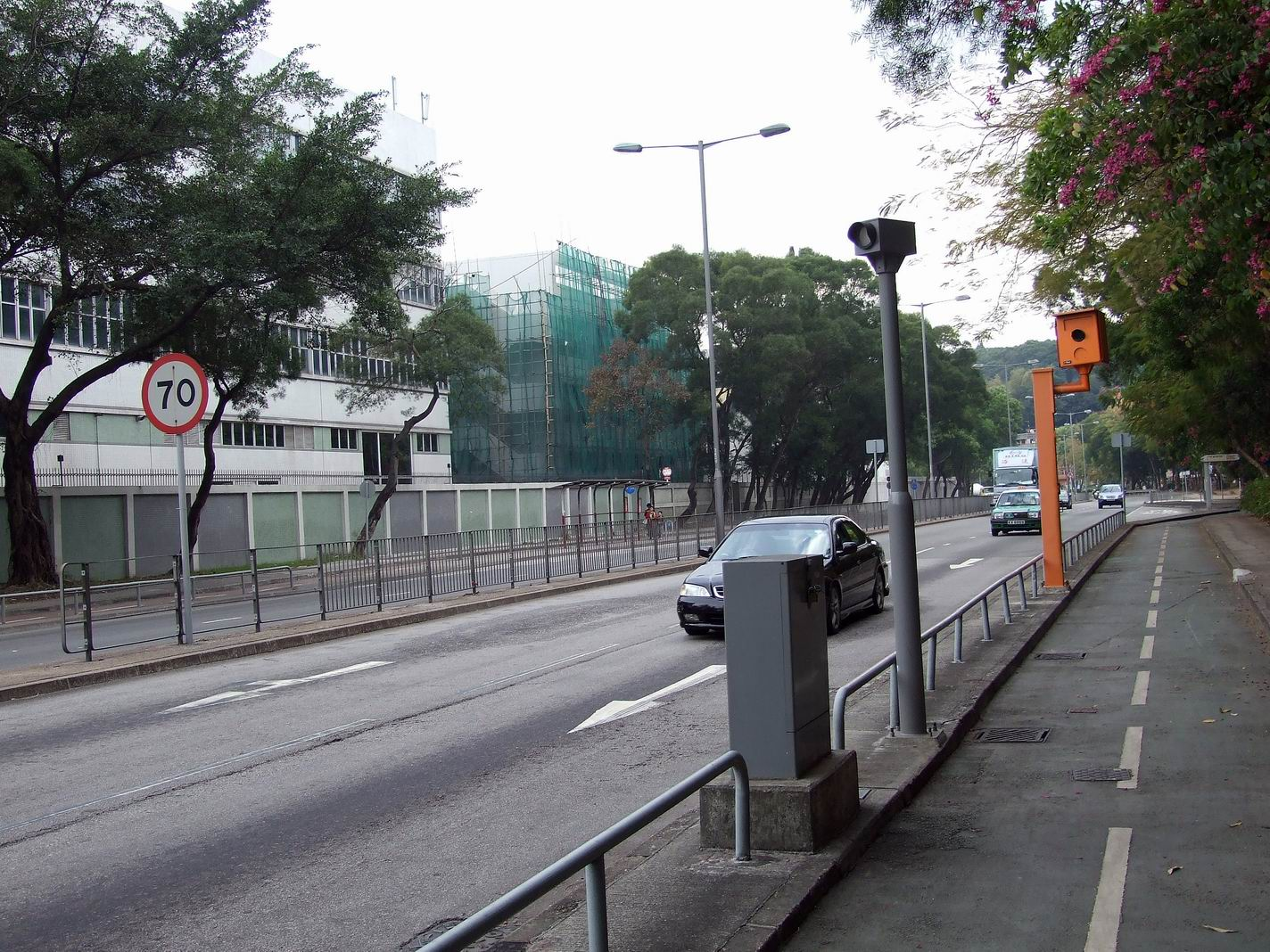
70 km/h speed limit and speed enforcement equipment on the industrial estate section

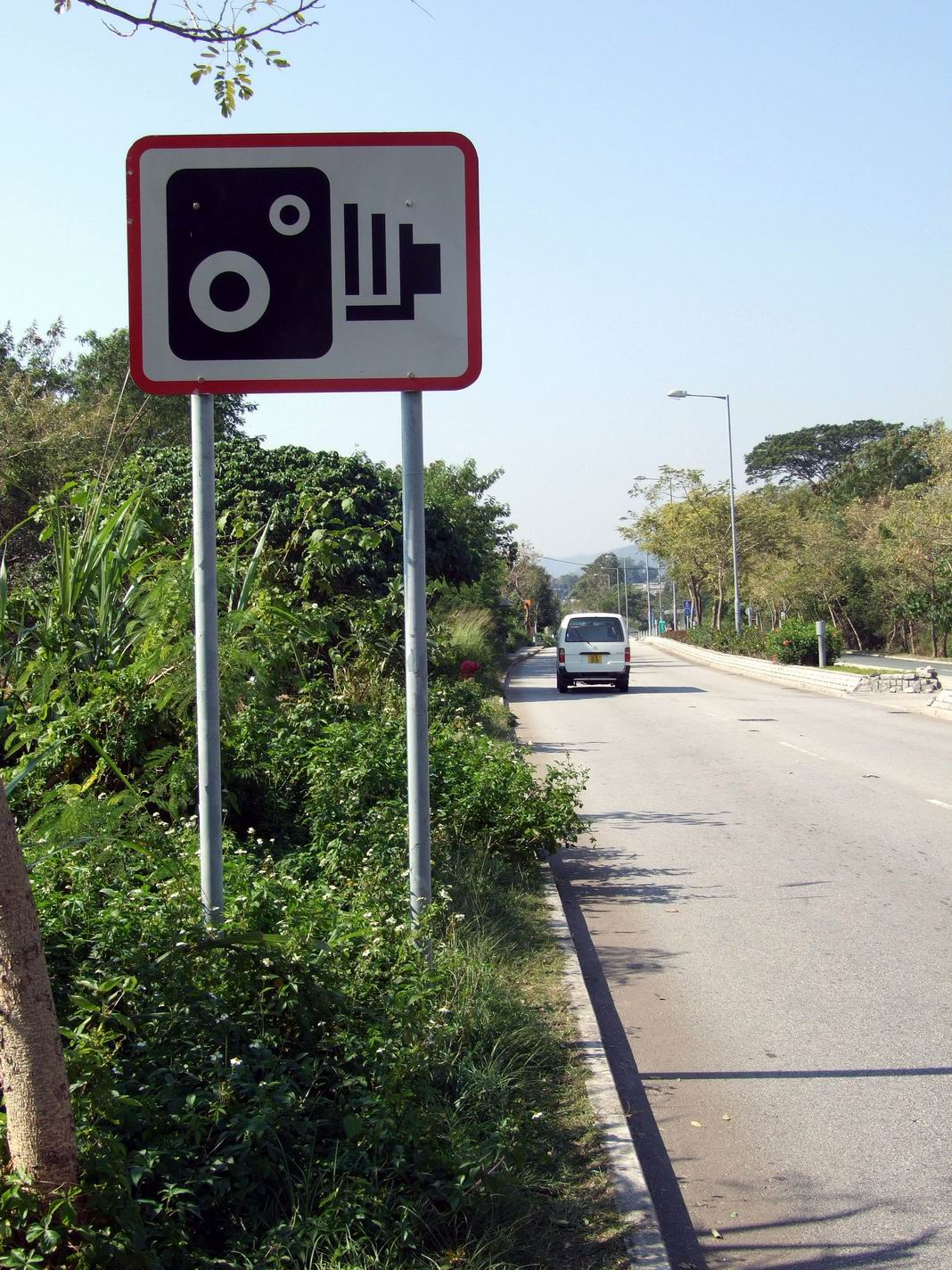
Speed enforcement warning sign on the Tai Mei Tuk section

== Incidents ==
On 26 March 2026, a fire broke out at a recycling yard on Ting Kok Road near Fung Yuen Road, followed by an explosion. The fire produced large amounts of thick smoke, and several people were injured. The Fire Services Department said that a large quantity of butane gas canisters had been stored at the site and that it would follow up with an investigation.
