= Shan Liu =

Shan Liu is the name of several places in Hong Kong:

- Shan Liu (Sai Kung District), a village in Sai Kung District
- Shan Liu (Tai Po District), a village in Tai Po District
