= Lung Mei, Tai Po District =

Village of Hong Kong

Coordinates: 22.472736°N 114.229615°E

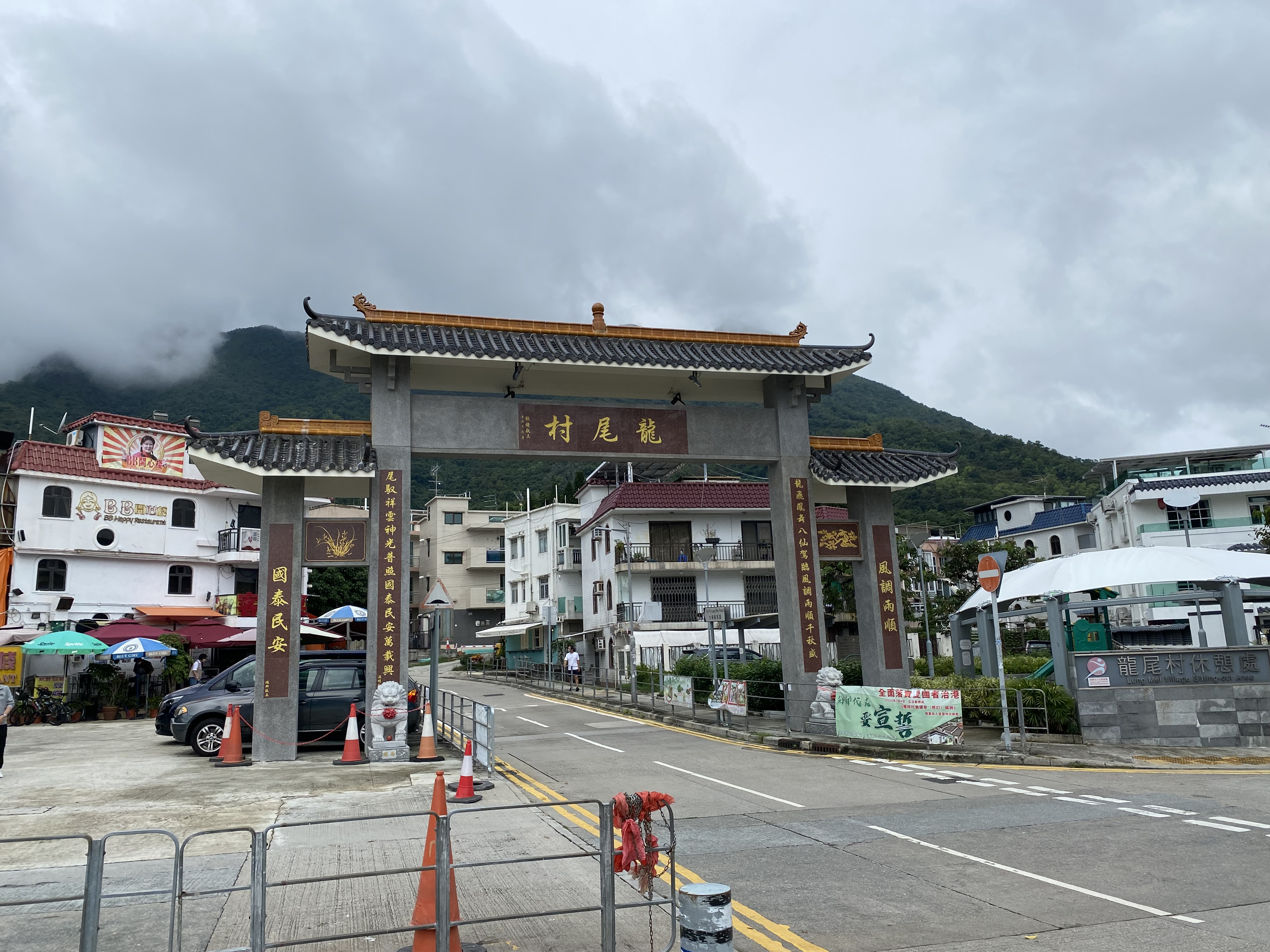
Paifang of Lung Mei Village.

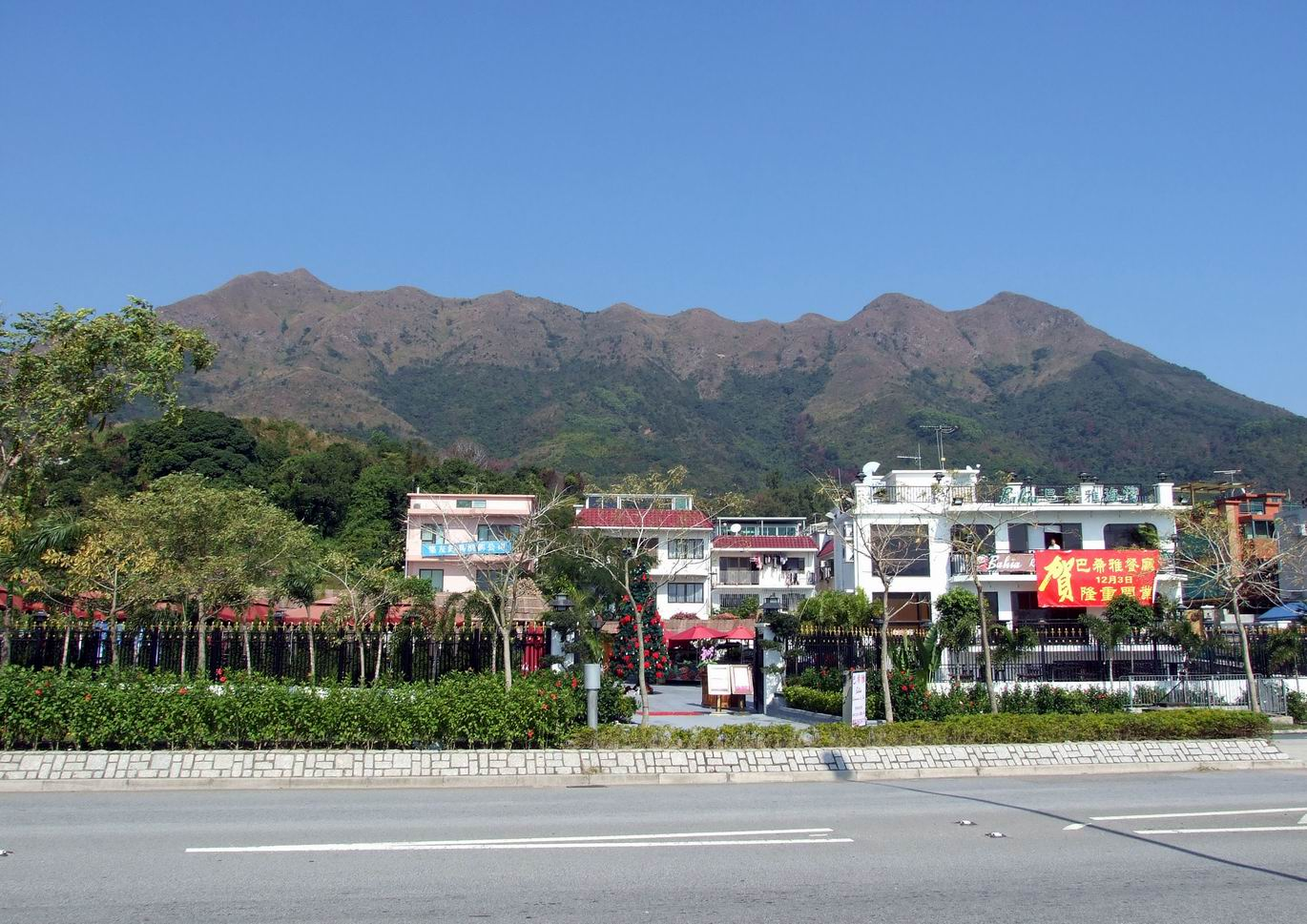
Lung Mei viewed from Ting Kok Road. The Pat Sin Leng mountain range is visible in the background.

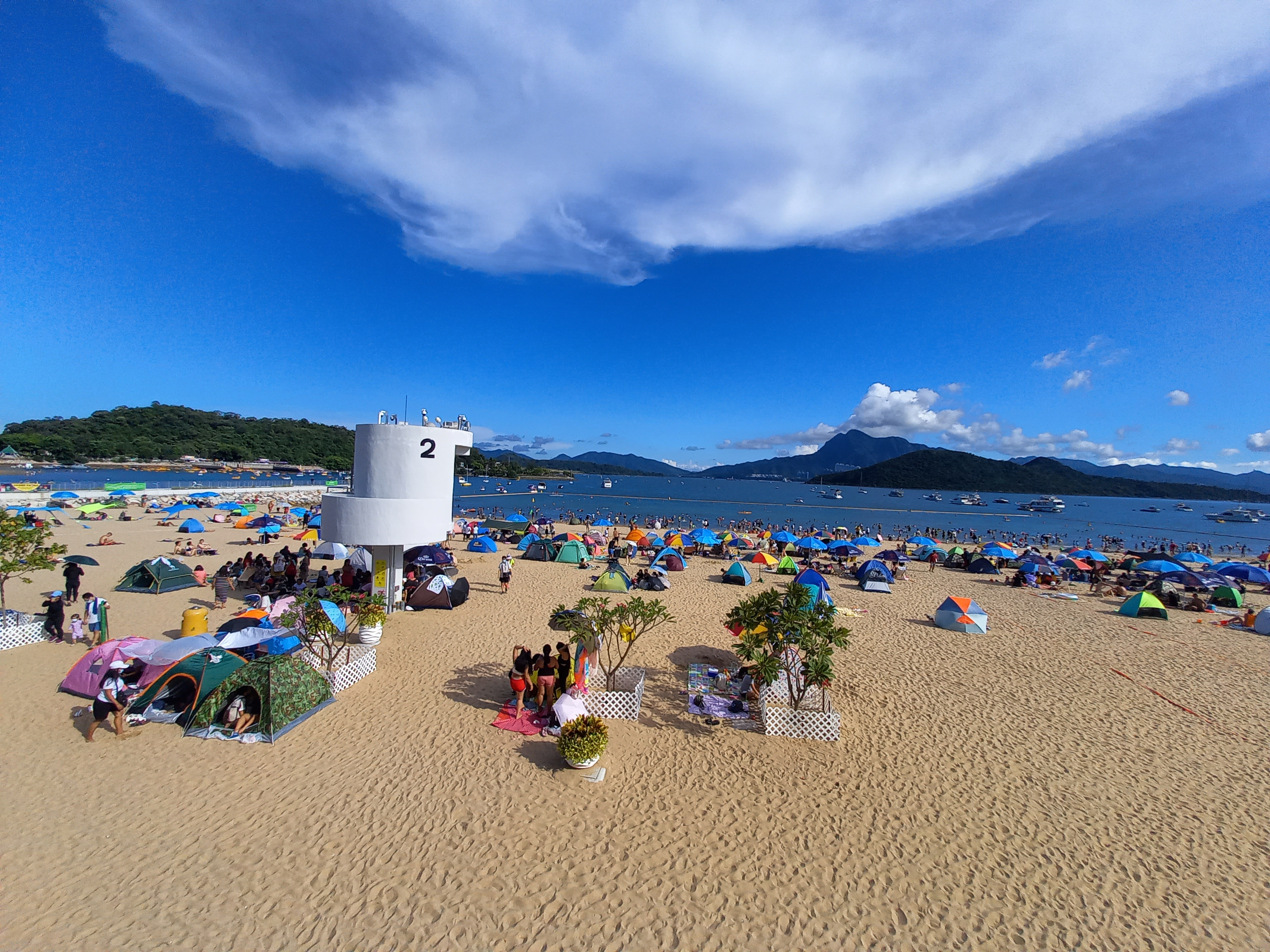
Lung Mei Beach in 2021.

Lung Mei (Chinese: 龍尾) is a village in the Plover Cove area of Tai Po District, Hong Kong. It is located on the northern shore of Plover Cove in the west of Tai Mei Tuk.

== Administration ==
Lung Mei is a recognized village under the New Territories Small House Policy. It is one of the villages represented within the Tai Po Rural Committee. For electoral purposes, Lung Mei is part of the Shuen Wan constituency, which was formerly represented by So Tat-leung until October 2021.

== History ==
Lung Mei was established before 1733. Historically, Ting Kok, together with the nearby Hakka villages of Shan Liu, Lai Pik Shan, Lo Tsz Tin, Lung Mei and Tai Mei Tuk belonged to the Ting Kok Yeuk (汀角約) alliance.

In February 2023, the dismembered body of Abby Choi Tin-fung was found in the village.
