= Tai Po Industrial Estate =

Industrial estate in Hong Kong

Coordinates: 22.457003°N 114.18824°E

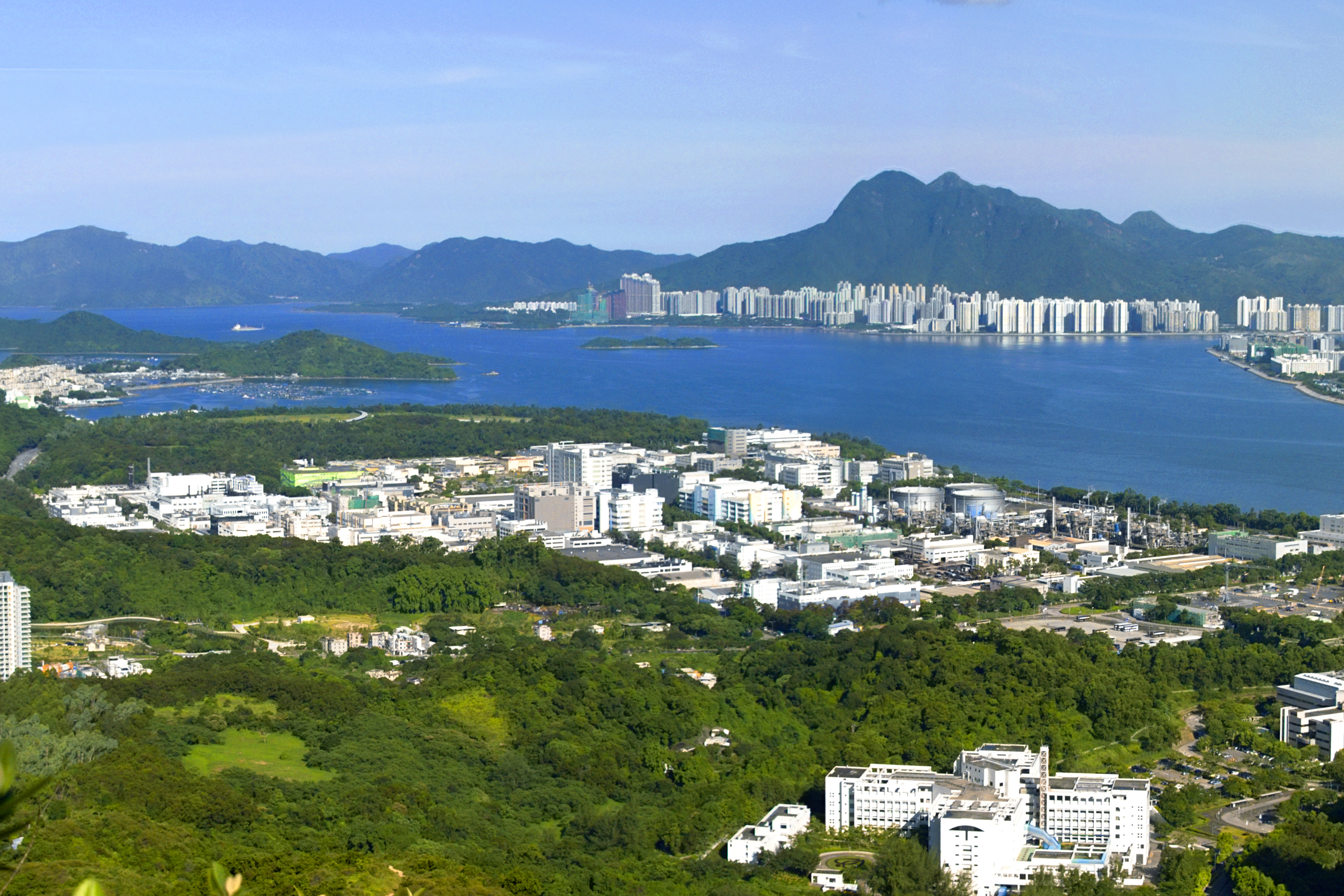
Tai Po Industrial Estate

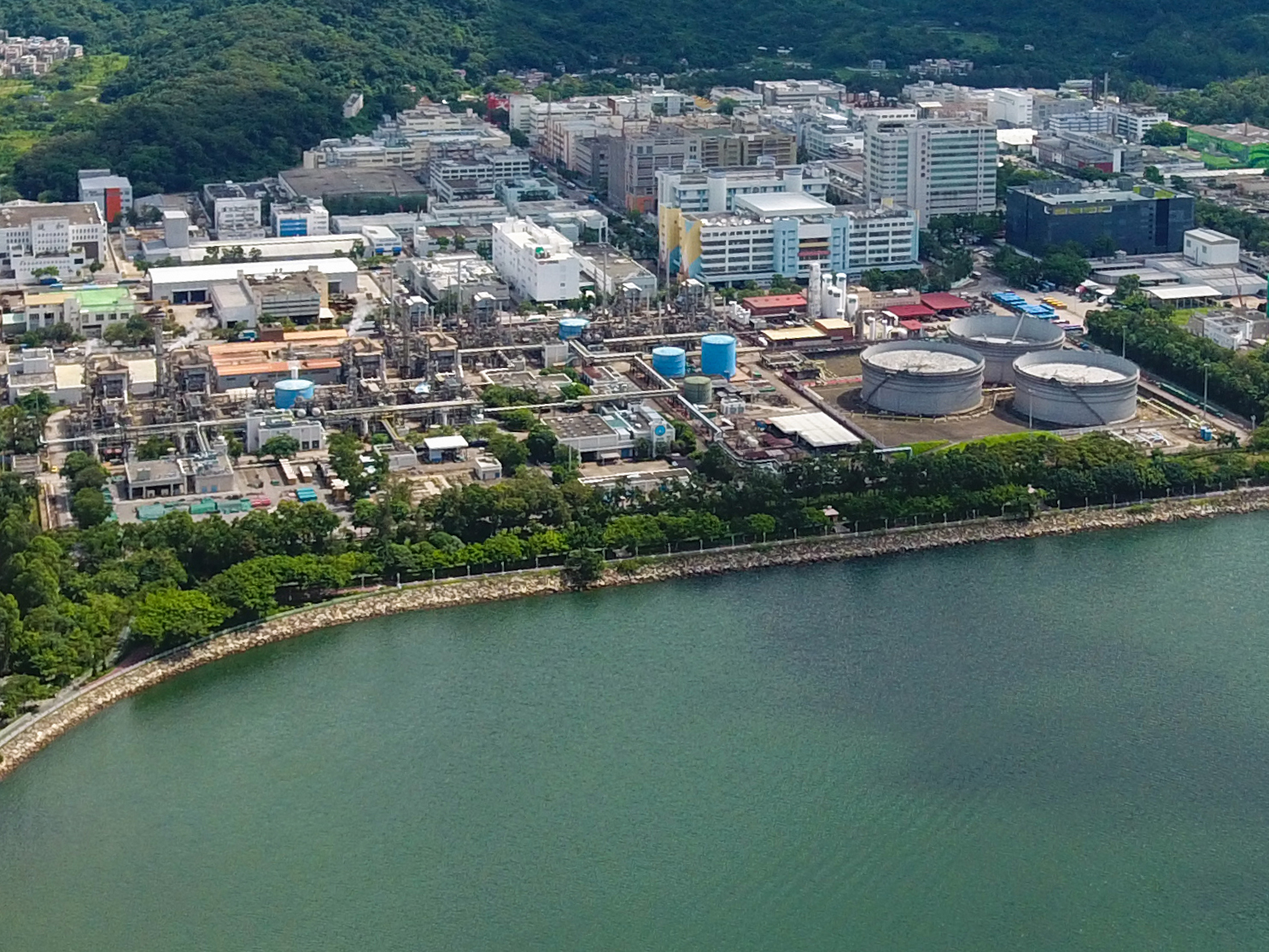
Tai Po Industrial Estate

Tai Po Industrial Estate (Chinese: 大埔工業邨, branded as 大埔工業園) is an industrial estate on the reclamation in Tai Po Hoi, Tai Po District, New Territories, Hong Kong. It is administered by the Hong Kong Science and Technology Parks Corporation.

== Location ==
Tai Po Industrial Estate is surrounded by the villages of Yue Kok, Kau Shi Wai, Tin Sam and Ha Hang on the former shore. It is at the northeast of Tai Po Market and connected by Ting Kok Road. Its west side is opposite to Fu Shin Estate.

== Companies ==
It is the home of many famous companies in Hong Kong such as South China Morning Post and the headquarters of Asia Television, whose ATV Enterprises Office at 25-37 Dai Shing Street formerly broadcast Cantonese-language TV channel ATV Home and the English-language ATV World before shuttering operations in 2016.

A large town gas production plant comprises 11.71 hectares within the estate, producing 97% of the supplies of the Towngas company.

Other companies such as Oriental Press Group, Maxim's Caterers, and APT Satellite Holdings have their headquarters or factories located in the Estate.
