= Lai Pek Shan San Tsuen =

Village in Tai Po District, Hong Kong

Coordinates: 22.474965°N 114.212183°E

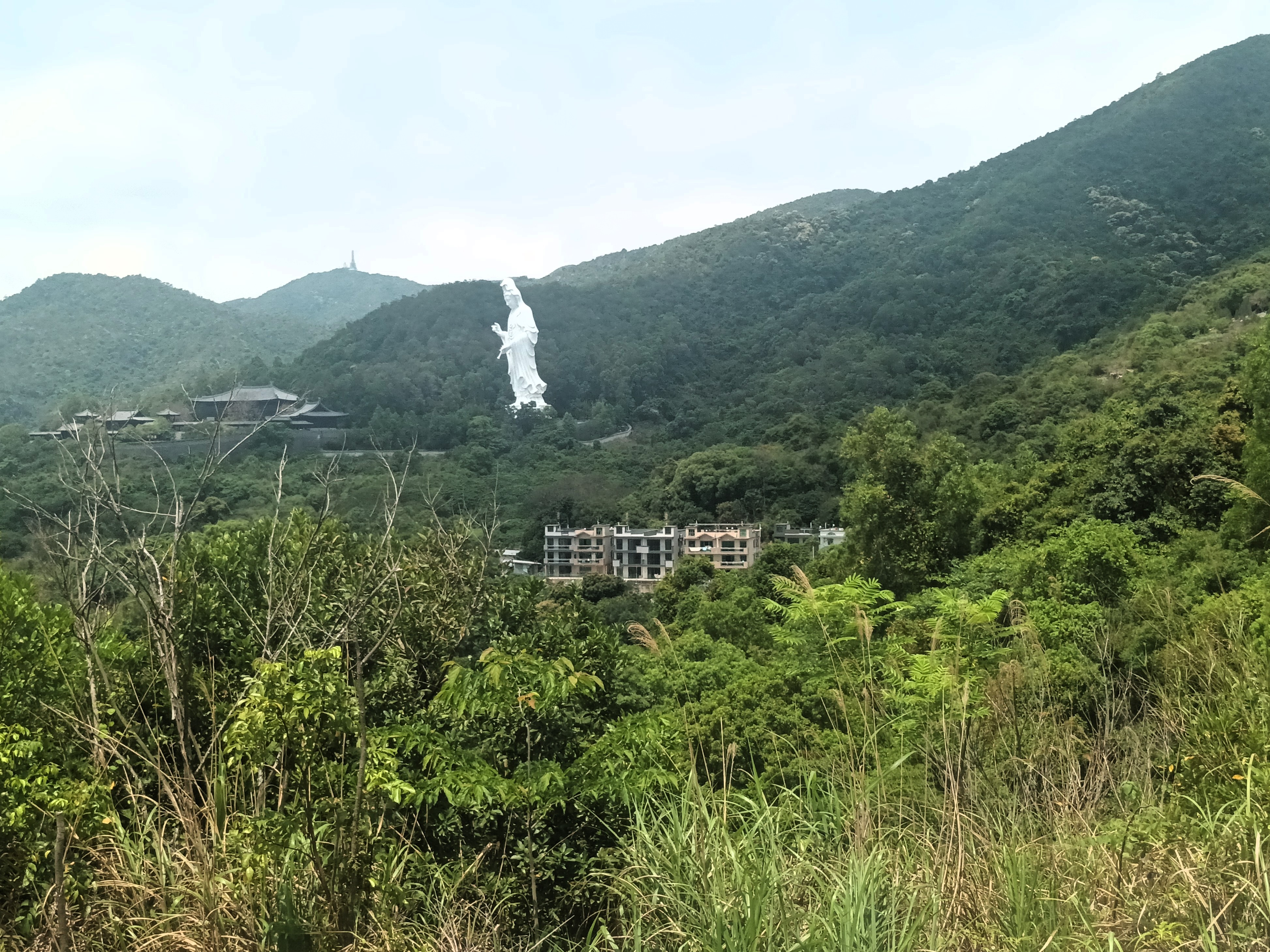
Lai Pek Shan San Tsuen with Tsz Shan Monastery and Cloudy Hill in the background

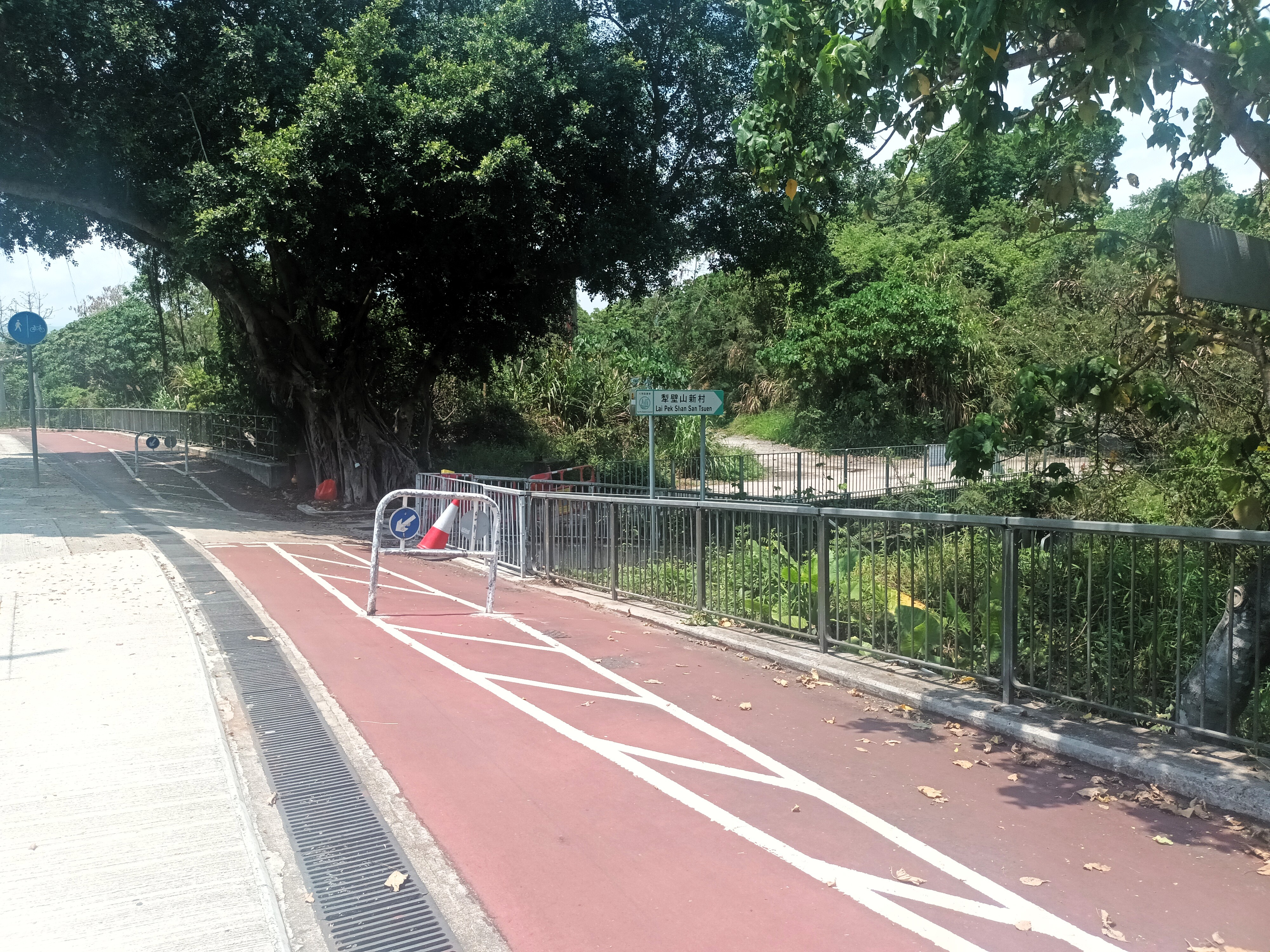
Road access to Lai Pek Shan San Tsuen (right) from Ting Kok Road

Lai Pek Shan San Tsuen (Chinese: 犁壁山新村; lit. 'Lai Pek Shan New Village') is a village in Tai Po District, Hong Kong.

== Administration ==
Lai Pek Shan San Tsuen is one of the villages represented within the Tai Po Rural Committee. For electoral purposes, Lai Pek Shan San Tsuen is part of the Shuen Wan constituency, which was formerly represented by So Tat-leung until October 2021.

Shan Liu (including Lai Pek Shan and Lai Pek Shan San Tsuen) is a recognized village under the New Territories Small House Policy.

== See also ==
- Lai Pek Shan, a nearby hill and also the name of a former village
