= Yue Kok =

Village in Hong Kong

Coordinates: 22.458236°N 114.177107°E

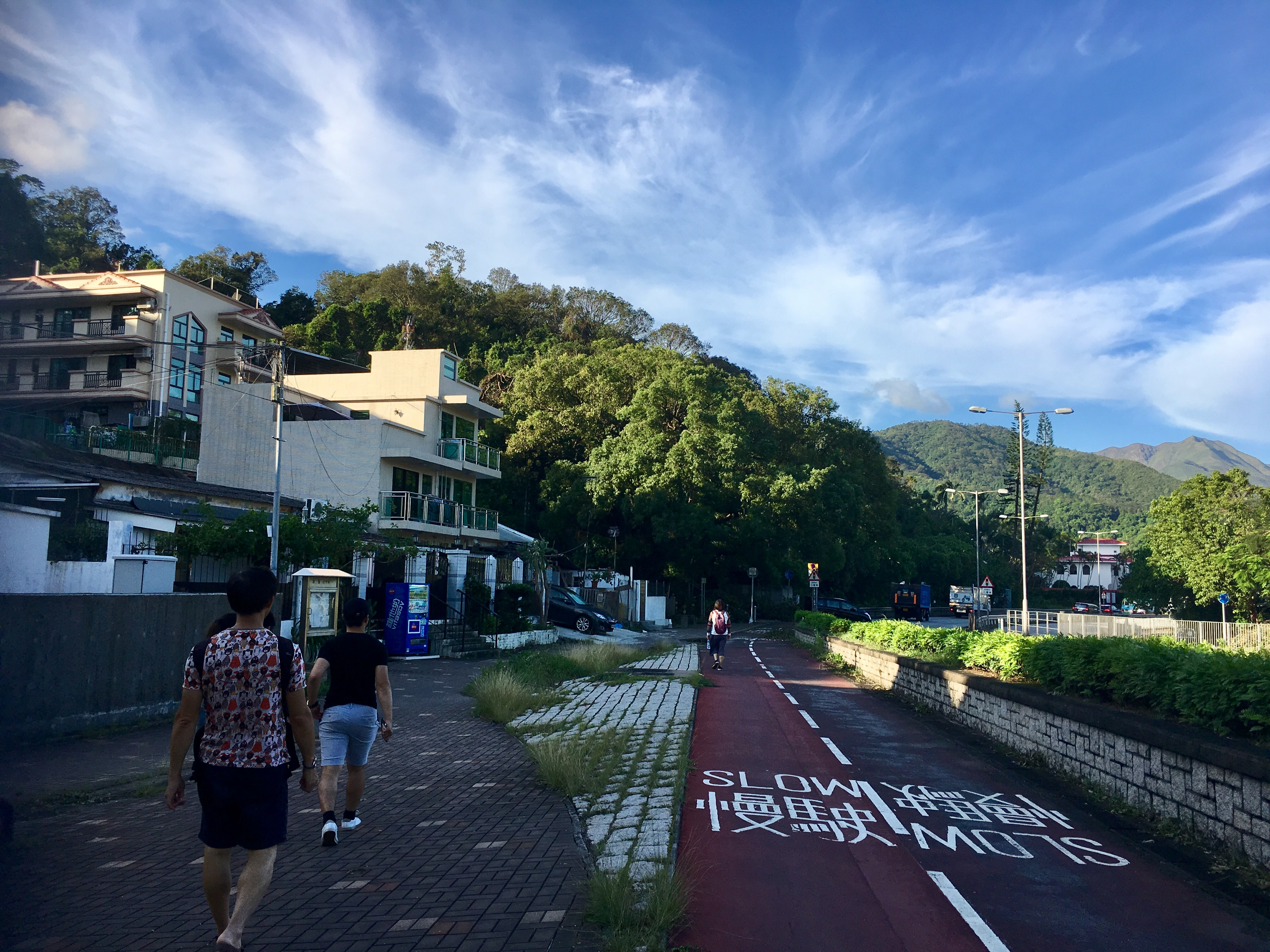
Yue Kok.

Yue Kok (Chinese: 魚角) is a village in Tai Po District, Hong Kong.

== Administration ==
Yue Kok is a recognized village under the New Territories Small House Policy. It is one of the villages represented within the Tai Po Rural Committee. For electoral purposes, Yue Kok is part of the Hong Lok Yuen constituency, which was formerly represented by Zero Yiu Yeuk-sang until May 2021.

== See also ==
- Tai Po Industrial Estate
