= Lo Tsz Tin =

Village in Tai Po District, Hong Kong

Coordinates: 22.473825°N 114.225988°E

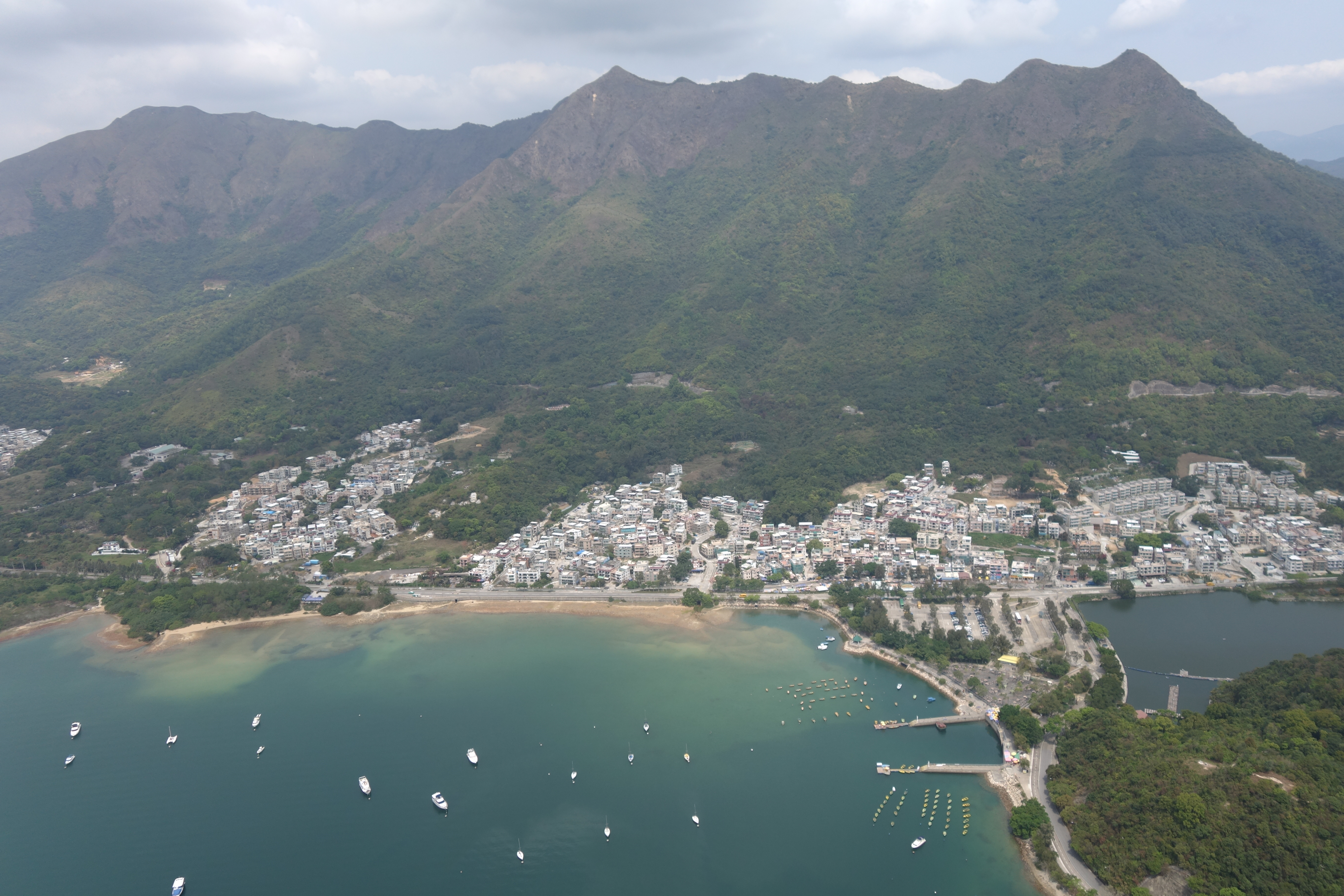
Lo Tsz Tin is the village on the left. The Wong Leng and Pat Sin Leng mountain ranges are visible in the background.

Lo Tsz Tin (Chinese: 蘆慈田) is a village in Tai Po District, Hong Kong.

== Administration ==
Lo Tsz Tin is a recognized village under the New Territories Small House Policy. It is one of the villages represented within the Tai Po Rural Committee. For electoral purposes, Lo Tsz Tin is part of the Shuen Wan constituency, which was formerly represented by So Tat-leung until October 2021.

== History ==
Historically, Ting Kok, together with the nearby Hakka villages of Shan Liu, Lai Pik Shan, Lo Tsz Tin, Lung Mei and Tai Mei Tuk belonged to the Ting Kok Yeuk (汀角約) alliance.
