= Fung Yuen =

Village and area in Hong Kong

Coordinates: 22.461630°N 114.180490°E

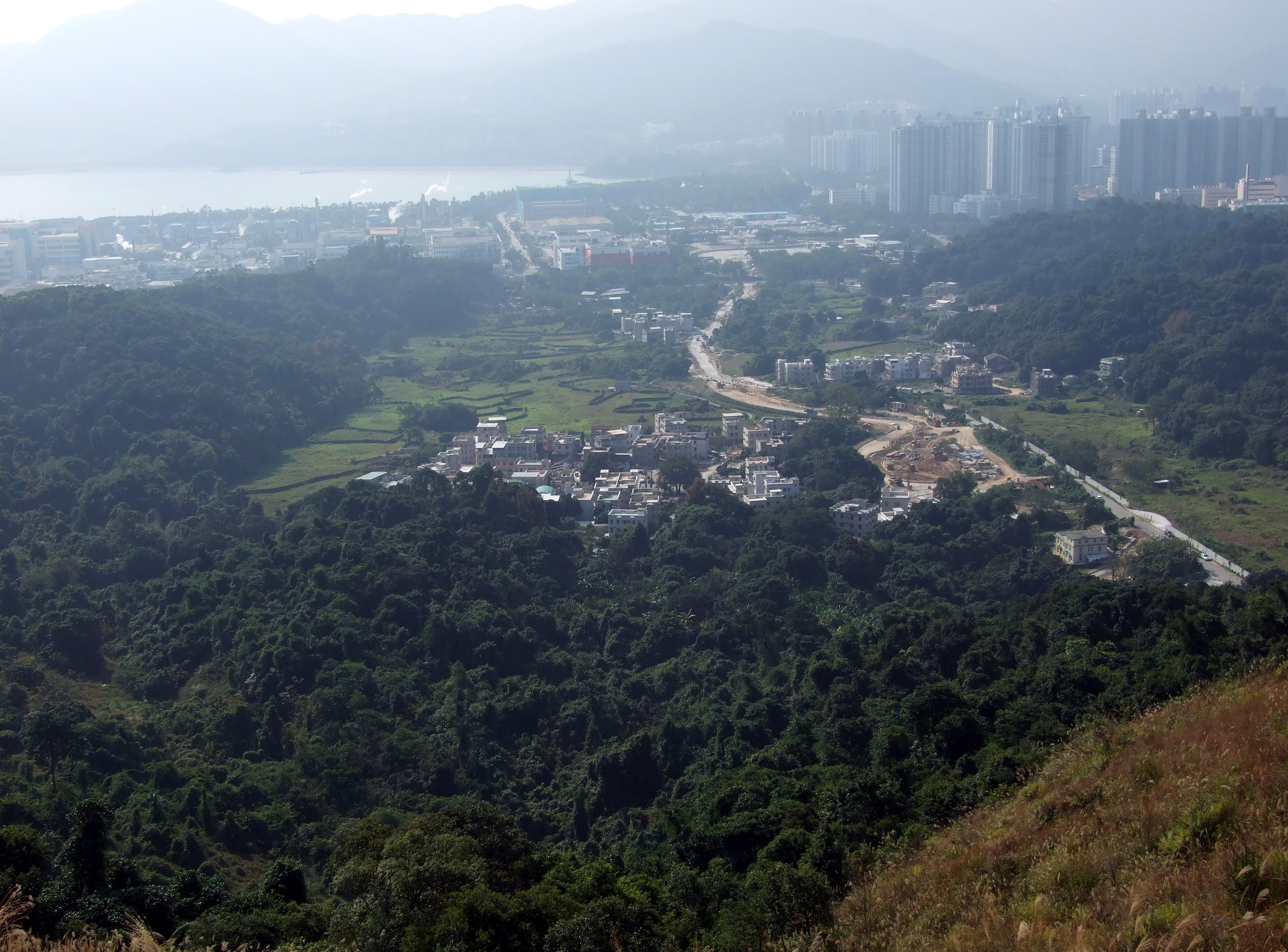
Fung Yuen valley, looking south toward Tai Po Industrial Estate and Tolo Harbour.

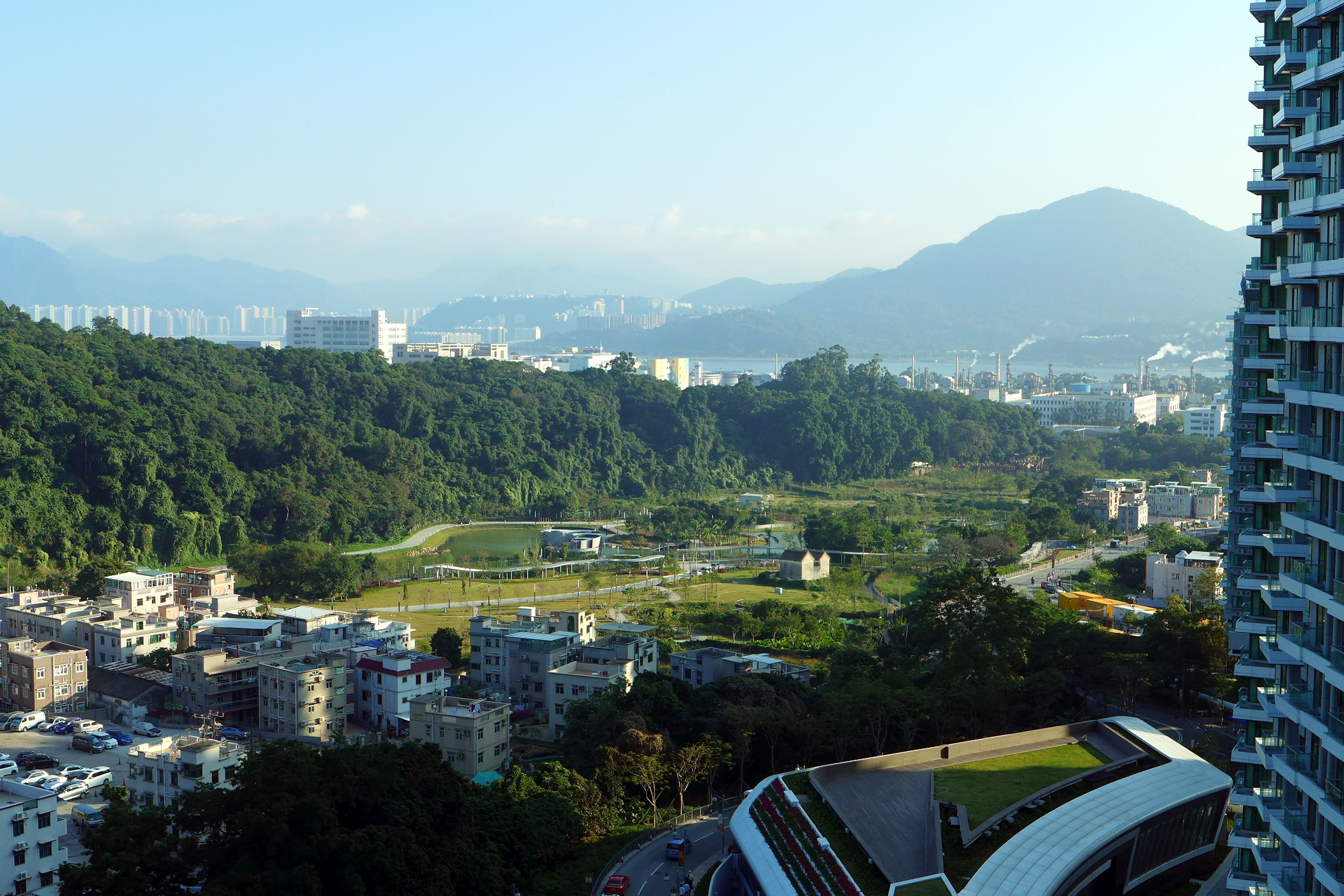
Mak Uk viewed from Mont Vert (嵐山) private housing estate.

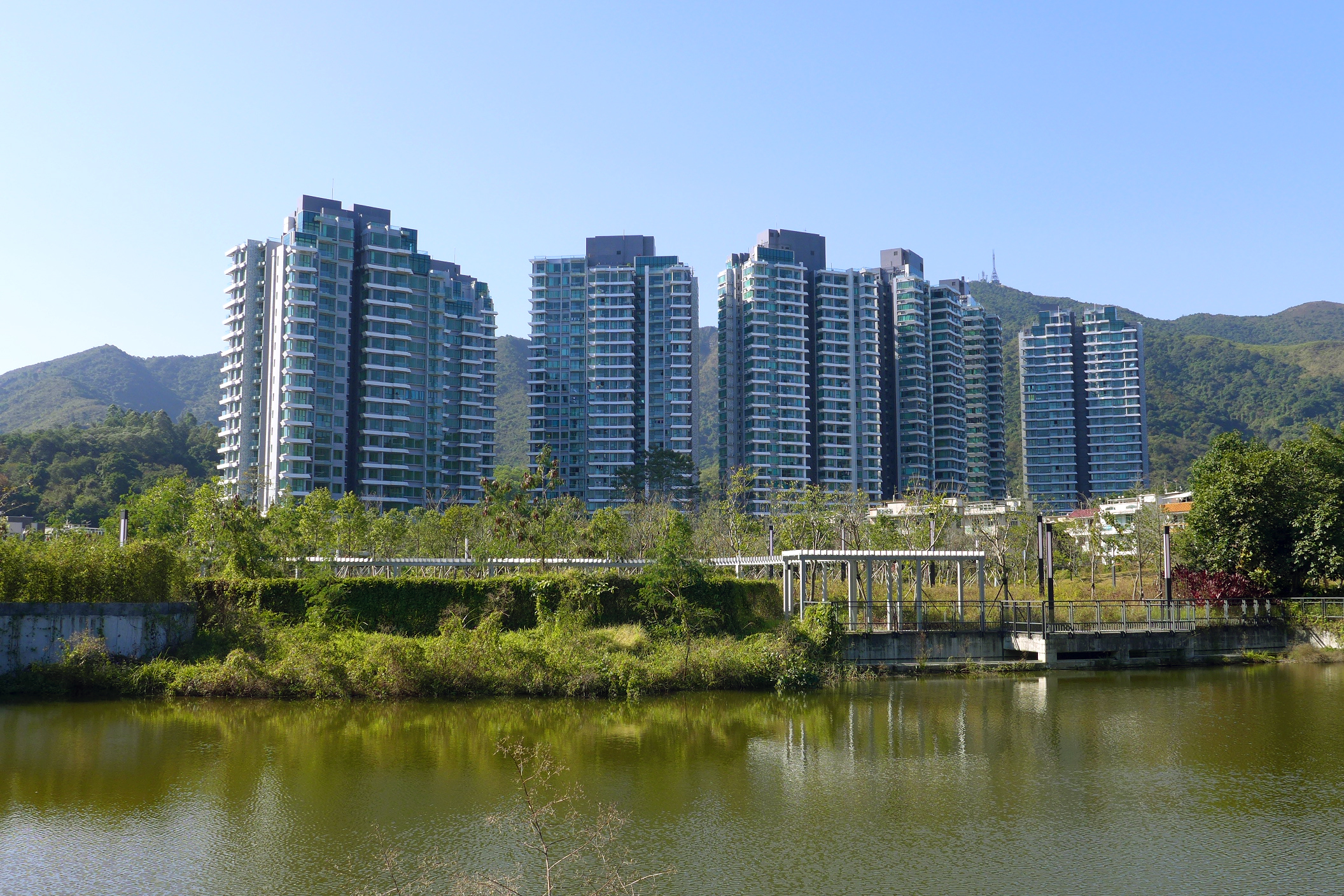
Mont Vert (嵐山) private housing estate in Fung Yuen.

Fung Yuen (Chinese: 鳳園) is an area and a village located northwest of Tolo Harbour, in Tai Po, Tai Po District, Hong Kong.

== History of Fung Yuen ==
Fung Yuen Village has a history spanning of over 300 years. It was originally settled and founded by six clans (families)—Lai (黎), Mak (麥) , Mok (莫) , Sip (薛), Wai (韋), Yip (葉)—who established the Luk Sing Tang (陸陞堂) in Lo Wai, whose name means “people of six surnames.” The surrounding walls were constructed to safeguard residents and their property from bandit attacks.

The village is located between two mountains, the “Green Dragon” (青龍) on the left and the “White Tiger” (白虎) on the right. It was later renamed Fung Yuen Village (鳳園村) , inspired by a nearby mountain whose shape resembles a phoenix—a mythical bird known as “fung” (鳳) in Cantonese.

At the time of the 1911 census, the population of Fung Yuen was 133, with the number of males being 60.

== Administration ==
Fung Yuen is a recognized village under the New Territories Small House Policy. For electoral purposes, it is part of the Hong Lok Yuen constituency of the Tai Po District Council. It was formerly represented by Zero Yiu Yeuk-sang, who was elected in the local elections until May 2021.

== Villages ==
There are five villages in Fung Yuen:

- Fung Mei Wai, formerly Kau Shi Wai (狗屎圍)
- Fung Yuen Lo Tsuen (鳳園老村)
- Lau Hang (流坑)
- Mak Uk (麥屋; 'Mak's House')
- Tin Sam (田心)

== Conservation ==
Fung Yuen Valley has been listed as a Site of Special Scientific Interest (SSSI) since 1980 to reflect "its importance as a major breeding site for butterflies". The protected area covers approximately 43 hectares. Within this area, the Fung Yuen Butterfly Reserve was set up on 2 hectares of private land in 2005 by the Tai Po Environmental Association through the funding from the Environment and Conservation Fund.
