= Lai Pek Shan =

Coordinates: 22.48997°N 114.21516°E

Lai Pek Shan (Chinese: 犂壁山) is a 540 high mountain in Hong Kong, located west of the Pat Sin Leng range. The summit of Lai Pek Shan is located at the boundary between Tai Po District and North District.

== Village ==
A former village, also called Lai Pek Shan or Lai Pik Shan, was located on the southern hillside of the mountain, and has been levelled. A new village, Lai Pek Shan San Tsuen (犁壁山新村; 'Lai Pek Shan New Village'), was built at the foot of the hill.

Shan Liu (including Lai Pek Shan and Lai Pek Shan San Tsuen) is a recognized village under the New Territories Small House Policy.

Historically, Ting Kok, together with the nearby Hakka villages of Shan Liu, Lai Pik Shan, Lo Tsz Tin, Lung Mei and Tai Mei Tuk belonged to the Ting Kok Yeuk (汀角約) alliance.

== Access ==
Stage 9 of the Wilson Trail passes near the summit of Lai Pek Shan.
