= Fung Mei Wai =

Village in Fung Yuen, Tai Po, Hong Kong

Fung Mei Wai 鳳美圍
- Village
- Location in China Location in Hong Kong
- Coordinates: 22°27′39.06″N 114°10′43.71″E
- Country: China
- SAR: Hong Kong
- Region: New Territories
- District: Tai Po

Fung Mei Wai

Current name
- Traditional Chinese: 鳳美圍
- Simplified Chinese: 凤美围
- Literal meaning: Fung Beautiful Walled Village
Transcriptions
Standard Mandarin
- Hanyu Pinyin: Fèng Měi Wéi
- Bopomofo: ㄈㄥˋ ㄇㄟˇ ㄨㄟˊ
- Gwoyeu Romatzyh: Fenq Meei Wei
- Wade–Giles: Feng^{4} Mei^{3} Wei^{2}
Yue: Cantonese
- Yale Romanization: Fuhng Méih Wàih
- Jyutping: Fung^{6} Mei^{5} Wai^{4}

Former name
- Traditional Chinese: 狗屎圍
- Simplified Chinese: 狗屎围
- Literal meaning: Dog Shit Walled Village
Transcriptions
Standard Mandarin
- Hanyu Pinyin: Gǒushǐ Wéi
- Bopomofo: ㄍㄡˇ ㄕˇ ㄨㄟˊ
- Gwoyeu Romatzyh: Gooushyy Wei
- Wade–Giles: Kou^{3}-shih^{3} Wei^{2}
Yue: Cantonese
- Yale Romanization: Gáu Sí Wàih
- Jyutping: Gau^{2} Si^{2} Wai^{4}

Fung Mei Wai (Chinese: 鳳美圍), formerly Kau Shi Wai (狗屎圍, literally dog shit walled (village)), is a village in Fung Yuen, Tai Po, Hong Kong.

== Administration ==
Fung Mei Wai is one of the villages represented within the Tai Po Rural Committee. For electoral purposes, Fung Mei Wai is part of the Hong Lok Yuen constituency, which was formerly represented by Zero Yiu Yeuk-sang until May 2021.

== Name change ==
In 2013, the Lands Department's Geographical Place Names Board recommended changing the name of the village. The proposal followed a letter from a Tai Po Fung Yuen village representative, who complained that Kau Shi Wai (狗屎圍) was indecent and could cause embarrassment.

The Tai Po District Council voted in favour of the name change by 10 votes to 0, with 5 abstentions. The new name, Fung Mei Wai (鳳美圍), was officially adopted in January 2014. Signposts and the Lands Department's GeoInfo Map were subsequently updated to reflect the change.

== See also ==
- Shitterton
