= Tin Sam Tsuen, Tai Po District =

Village in Tai Po, Hong Kong

Coordinates: 22.461585°N 114.1806663°E

Tin Sam Tsuen (Chinese: 田心村) is a village in Fung Yuen, Tai Po, Hong Kong.

== Administration ==
Tin Sam Tsuen is one of the villages represented within the Tai Po Rural Committee. For electoral purposes, Tin Sam Tsuen is part of the Hong Lok Yuen constituency, which was formerly represented by Zero Yiu Yeuk-sang until May 2021.
