= Ha Hang =

Village in Tai Po, Hong Kong

Coordinates: 22.463309°N 114.187092°E

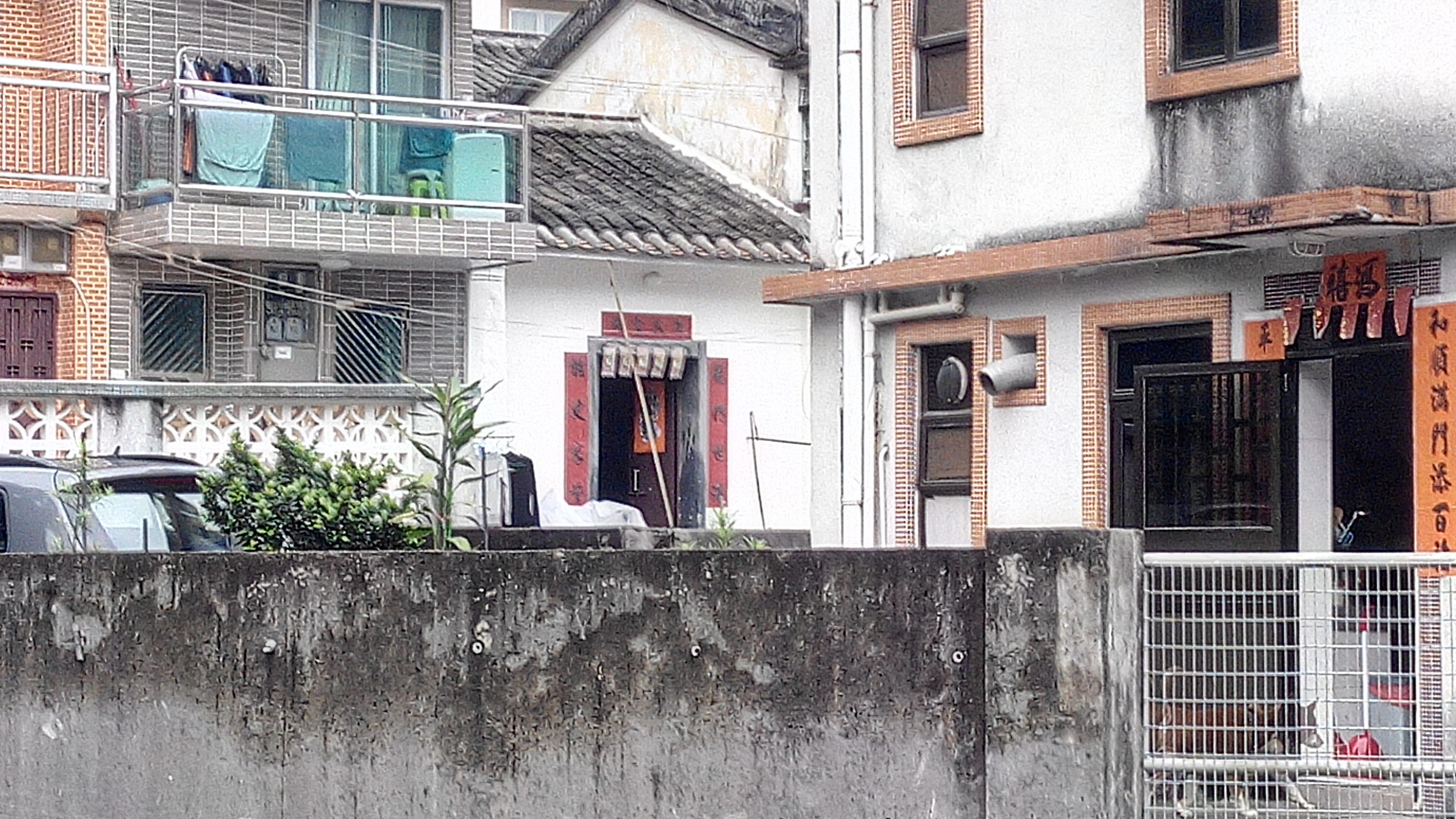
Lee Ancestral Hall in Ha Hang.

Ha Hang (Chinese: 下坑) is a village in Tai Po District, Hong Kong.

== Administration ==
Ha Hang is a recognized village under the New Territories Small House Policy. It is one of the villages represented within the Tai Po Rural Committee. For electoral purposes, Ha Hang is part of the Hong Lok Yuen constituency, which was formerly represented by Zero Yiu Yeuk-sang until May 2021.

== History ==
At the time of the 1911 census, the population of Ha Hang was 97. The number of males was 40.

== See also ==
- Tai Po Industrial Estate
