= Shan Liu (Tai Po District) =

Village in Tai Po District, Hong Kong

Coordinates: 22.478818°N 114.217127°E

Shan Liu (Chinese: 山寮) is a village in the Plover Cove area of Tai Po District, Hong Kong.

== Administration ==
Shan Liu is one of the villages represented within the Tai Po Rural Committee. For electoral purposes, Shan Liu is part of the Shuen Wan constituency, which was formerly represented by So Tat-leung until October 2021.

Shan Liu (including Lai Pek Shan and Lai Pek Shan San Tsuen) is a recognized village under the New Territories Small House Policy.

== History ==
Historically, Ting Kok, together with the nearby Hakka villages of Shan Liu, Lai Pik Shan, Lo Tsz Tin, Lung Mei and Tai Mei Tuk belonged to the Ting Kok Yeuk (汀角約) alliance.

Shan Liu was flooded as a consequence of heavy rains in July 2017. About 30 trapped residents were evacuated by Fire Services teams.
