= Tai Mei Tuk =

Place close to the Plover Cove Reservoir in Hong Kong

Coordinates: 22.4703°N 114.2329°E

Official name
- Traditional Chinese: 大美督
Transcriptions
Yue: Cantonese
- Yale Romanization: Daaih méih dūk
- Jyutping: Daai6 mei5 duk1

Also written as:
- Traditional Chinese: 大美篤 大尾篤 大尾督 大美篤
Transcriptions
Yue: Cantonese
- Yale Romanization: Daaih méih dūk
- Jyutping: Daai6 mei5 duk1

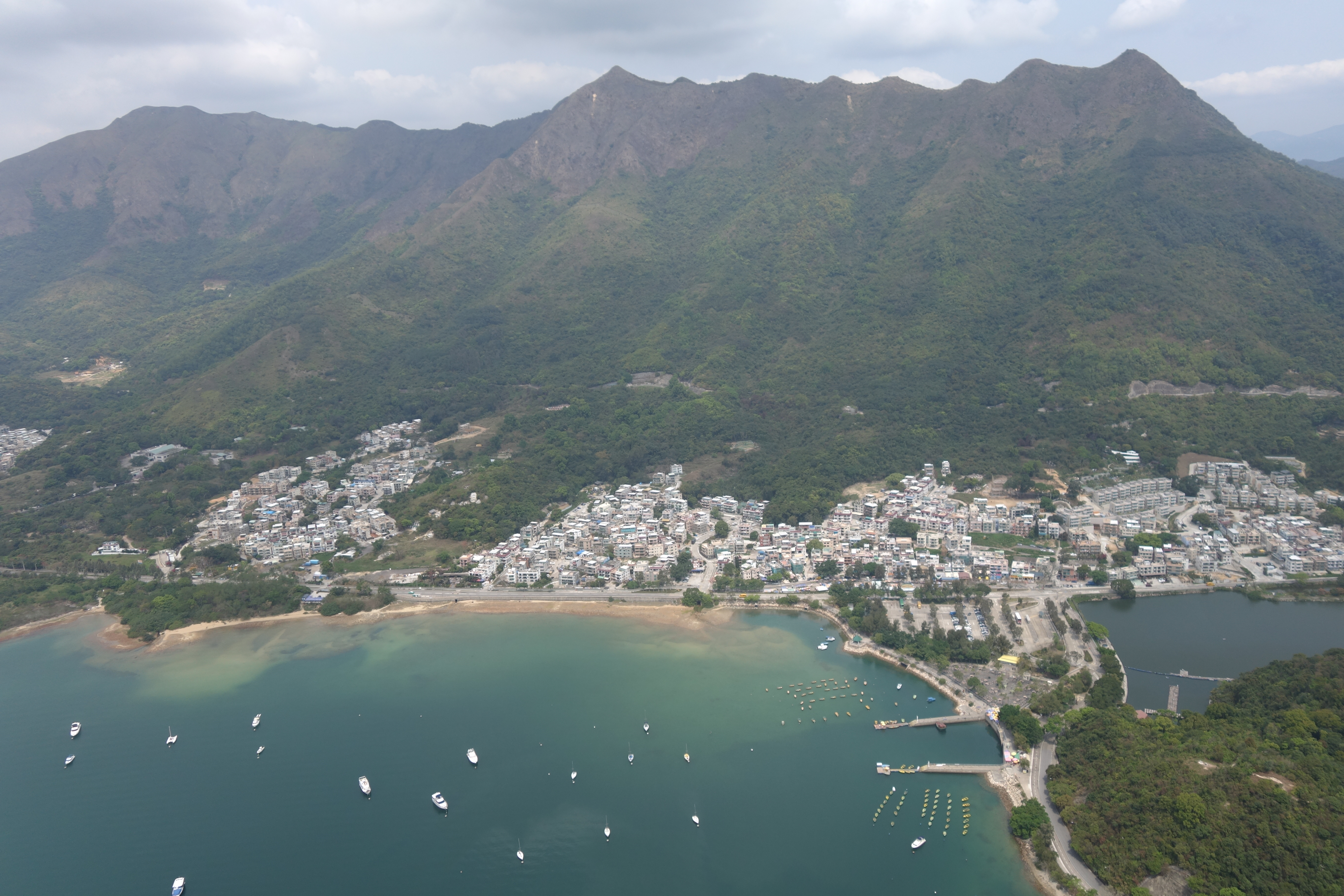
Pat Sin Leng serves as a backdrop for Tai Mei Tuk.

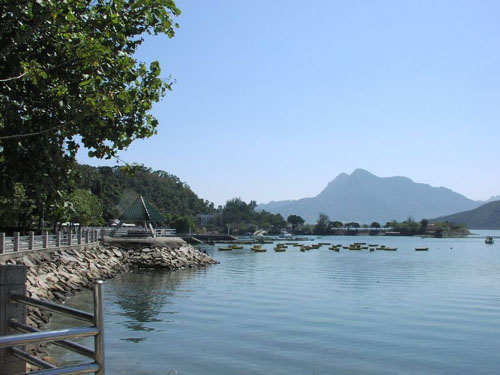
Tai Mei Tuk.

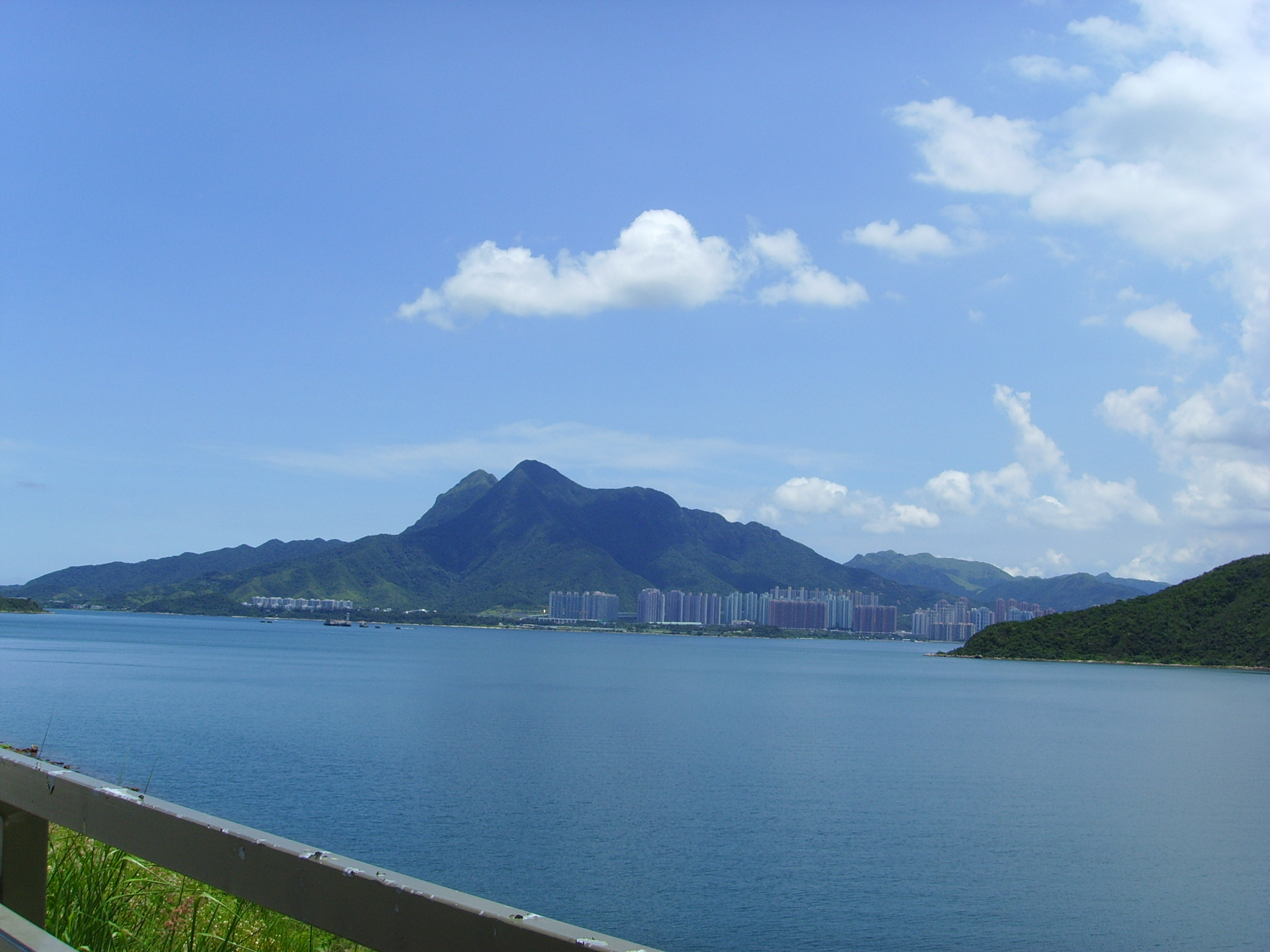
Tai Mei Tuk looking out to Tolo Harbour and Ma On Shan.

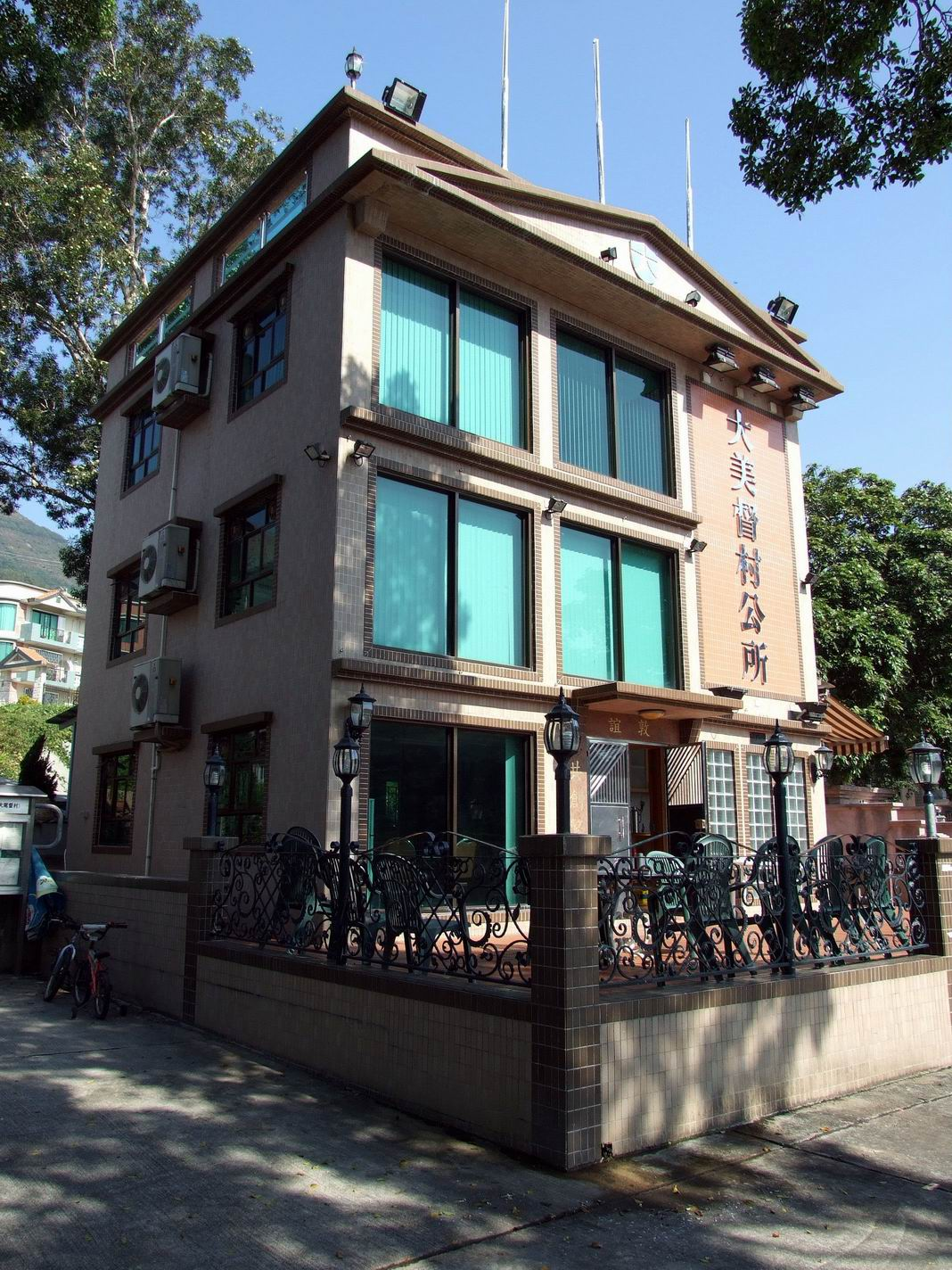
Tai Mei Tuk village office.

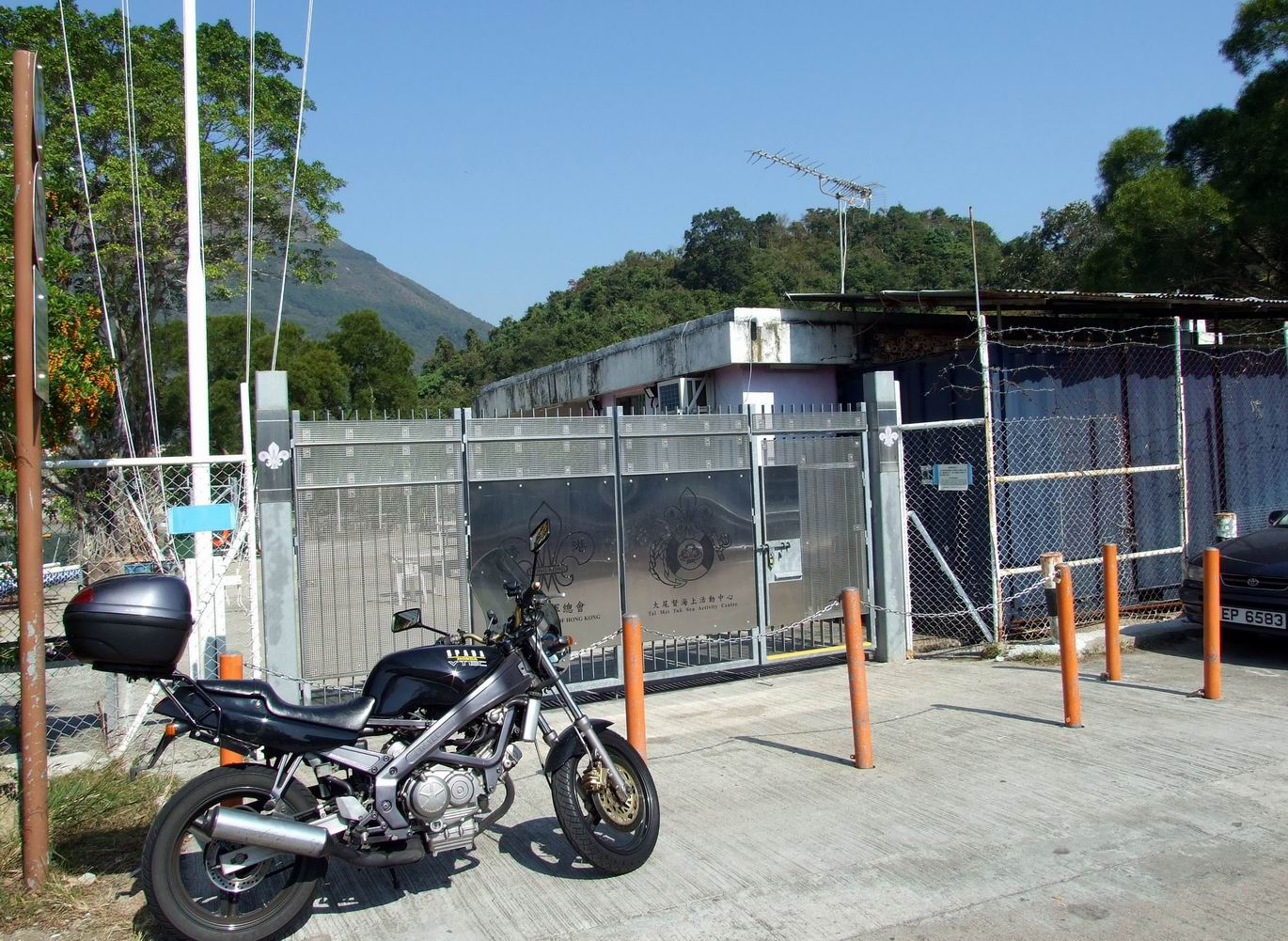
Boy Scouts Tai Mei Tuk Sea Activity Centre.

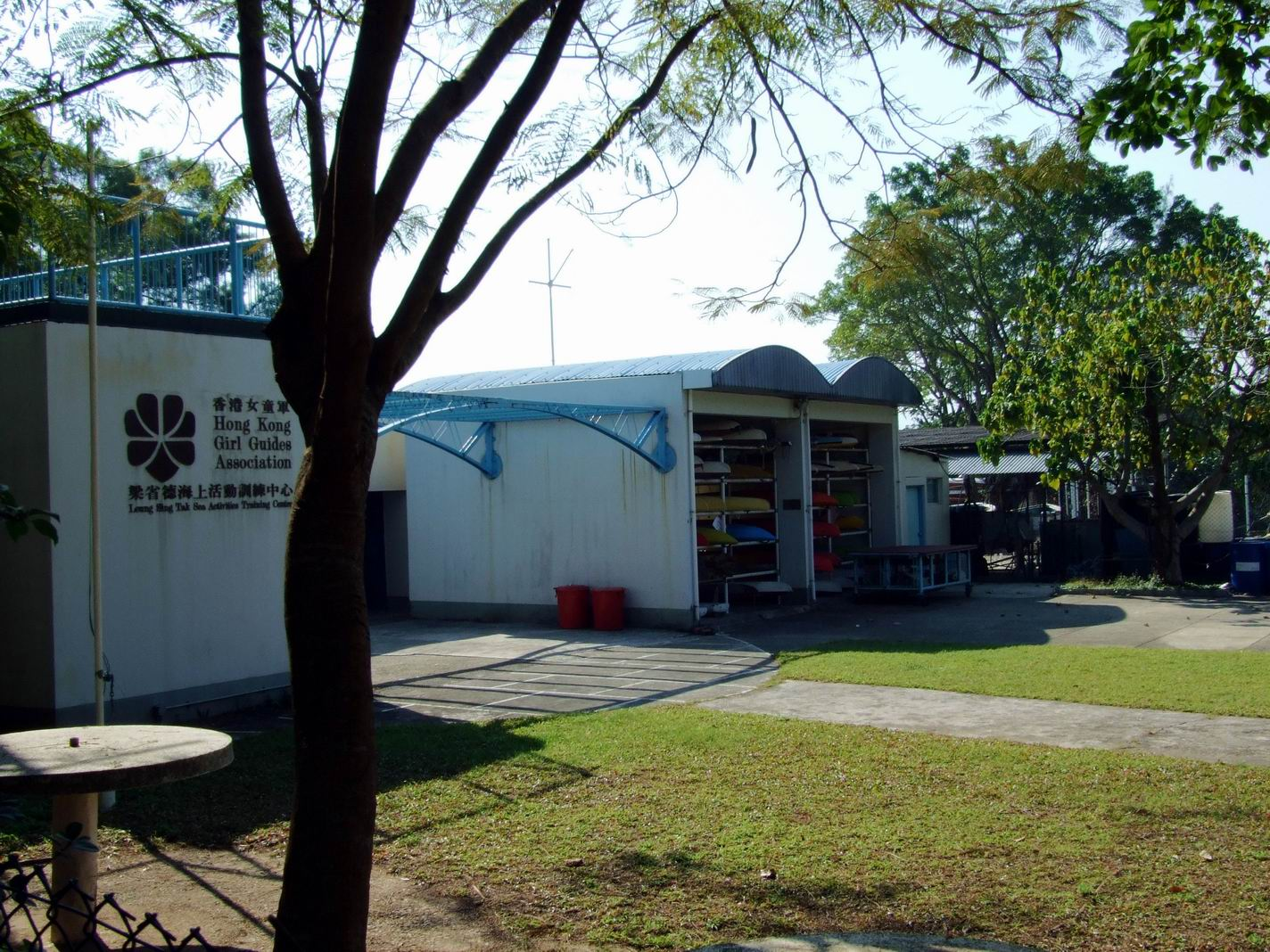
Girl Guide Leung Sing Tak Training Centre.

Tai Mei Tuk is a place close to the Plover Cove Reservoir in the Tai Po District, New Territories, Hong Kong.

== Administration ==
Tai Mei Tuk is a recognized village under the New Territories Small House Policy. It is one of the villages represented within the Tai Po Rural Committee. For electoral purposes, Tai Mei Tuk is part of the Shuen Wan constituency, which was formerly represented by So Tat-leung until October 2021.

== History ==
Historically, Ting Kok, together with the nearby Hakka villages of Shan Liu, Lai Pik Shan, Lo Tsz Tin, Lung Mei and Tai Mei Tuk belonged to the Ting Kok Yeuk (汀角約) alliance.

== Name ==
Tai Mei Tuk means "the very end" in the Cantonese language which depicts the landscape. The homonym character 篤 (tuk) is borrowed for the name. Recent Cantonese research suggested that the correct character is 䐁.

== Features ==
Tai Mei Tuk is a popular place for barbecues and cycling. There are villages and a harbour nearby, where many restaurants can be found. Bicycles are also available for hire in the villages.

The Tai Mei Tuk Sea Activity Centre of the Scout Association of Hong Kong is located in the area and also provides sea Scouting activities in Hong Kong.

The Hong Kong Government has holiday bungalows for government employees at Tai Mei Tuk.

== Climate ==
Climate data for Tai Mei Tuk (1993–2020)
Month	Jan	Feb	Mar	Apr	May	Jun	Jul	Aug	Sep	Oct	Nov	Dec	Year
Mean daily maximum °C (°F)	19.7 (67.5)	20.3 (68.5)	22.3 (72.1)	25.8 (78.4)	29.3 (84.7)	31.4 (88.5)	32.1 (89.8)	32.1 (89.8)	31.2 (88.2)	29.1 (84.4)	25.6 (78.1)	21.3 (70.3)	26.7 (80.0)
Daily mean °C (°F)	15.6 (60.1)	16.3 (61.3)	18.7 (65.7)	22.3 (72.1)	25.6 (78.1)	27.9 (82.2)	28.5 (83.3)	28.4 (83.1)	27.4 (81.3)	25.1 (77.2)	21.7 (71.1)	17.3 (63.1)	22.9 (73.2)
Mean daily minimum °C (°F)	12.8 (55.0)	13.8 (56.8)	16.2 (61.2)	19.8 (67.6)	23.3 (73.9)	25.6 (78.1)	25.9 (78.6)	25.8 (78.4)	24.9 (76.8)	22.6 (72.7)	19.0 (66.2)	14.3 (57.7)	20.3 (68.6)
Average precipitation mm (inches)	26.1 (1.03)	29.8 (1.17)	57.2 (2.25)	119.3 (4.70)	253.2 (9.97)	370.8 (14.60)	414.3 (16.31)	393.7 (15.50)	235.4 (9.27)	85.3 (3.36)	33.9 (1.33)	27.7 (1.09)	2,046.7 (80.58)
Source: Hong Kong Observatory

== See also ==
- Bride's Pool
