= Shan Liu (Sai Kung District) =

Village in Hong Kong

Coordinates: 22.39533°N 114.274362°E

Shan Liu (Chinese: 山寮) is a village in Sai Kung District, Hong Kong.

== Administration ==
Shan Liu is a recognized village under the New Territories Small House Policy.

== History ==
At the time of the 1911 census, the population of Shan Liu was 73. The number of males was 33.
