= Ting Kok =

Area and village in the New Territories, Hong Kong

Coordinates: 22.472232°N 114.220068°E

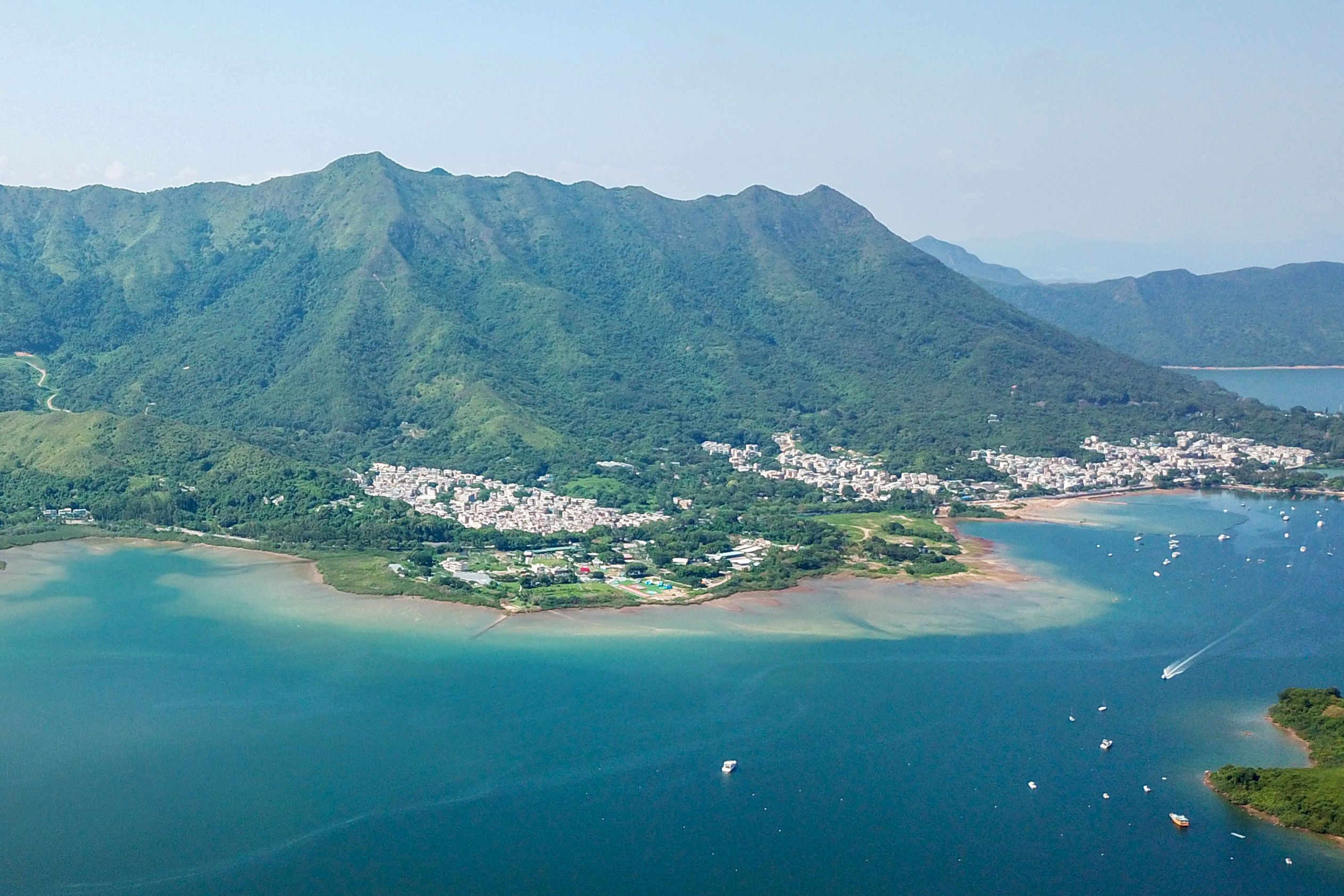
- Ting Kok is located at the foot of the Pat Sin Leng mountain range.
- Chinese: 汀角
Transcriptions
Standard Mandarin
- Hanyu Pinyin: Tīngjiǎo
Yue: Cantonese
- Jyutping: ding1 gok3

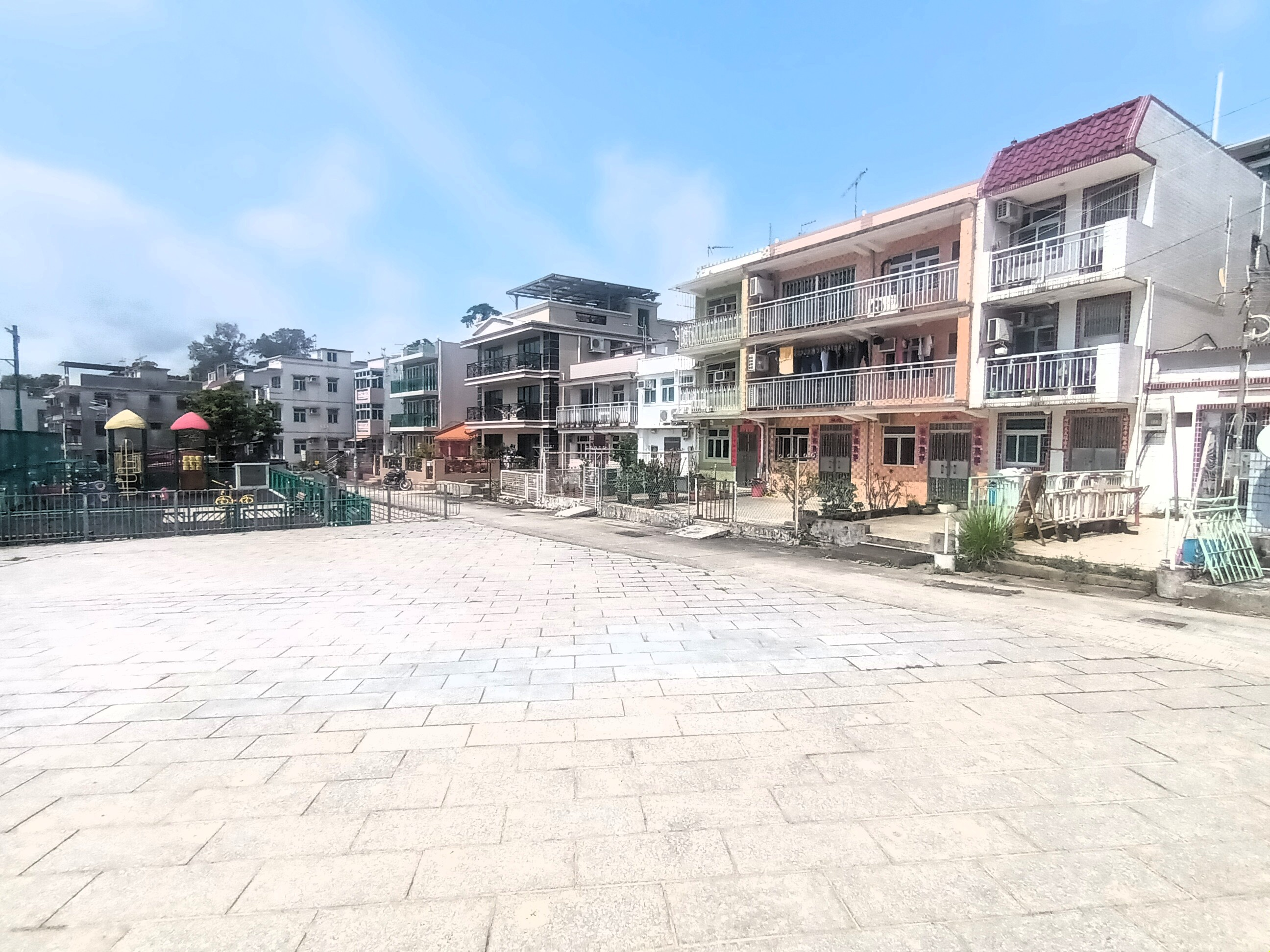
Central square of Ting Kok Village

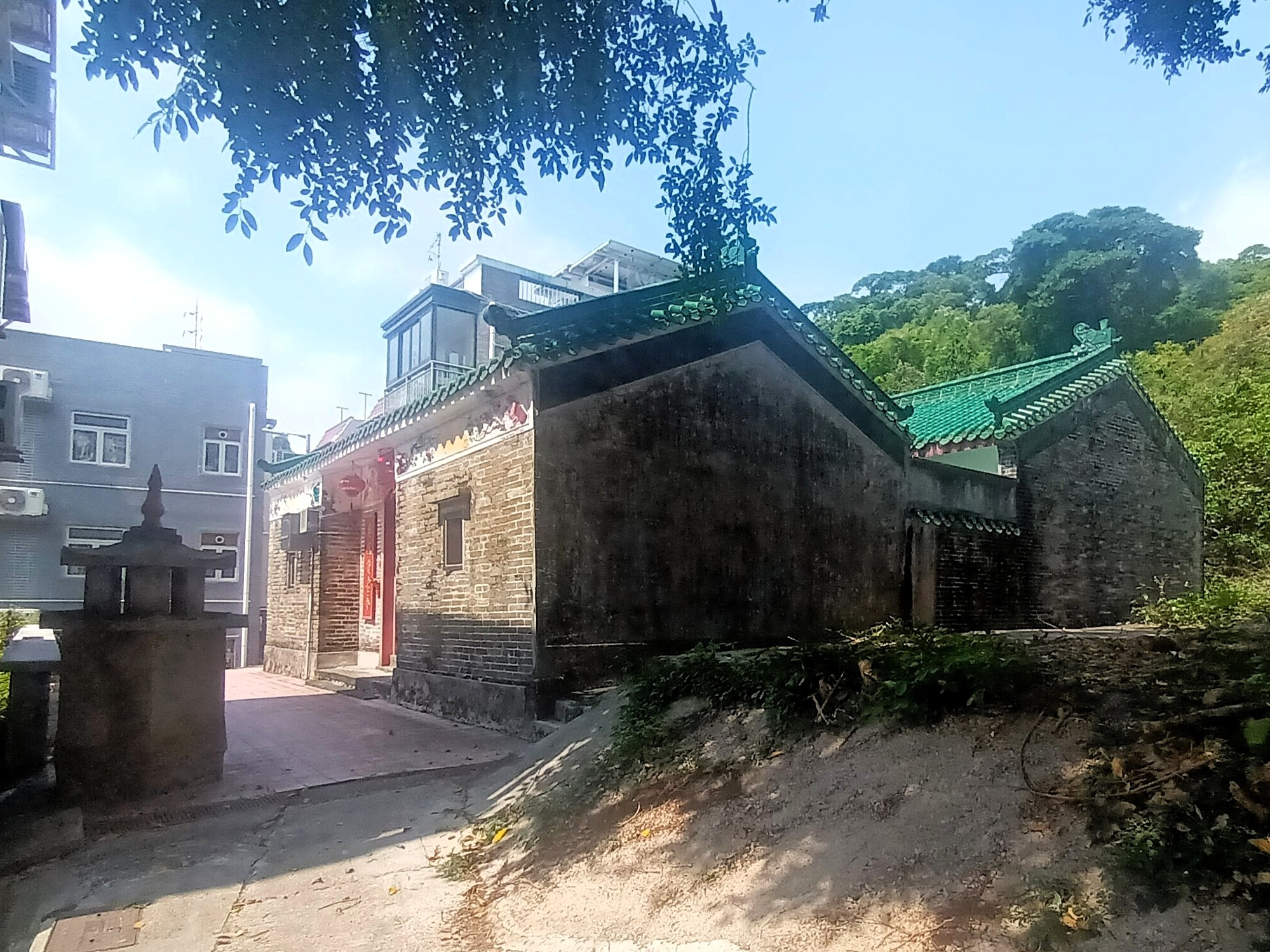
Mo Tai Temple in Ting Kok Village

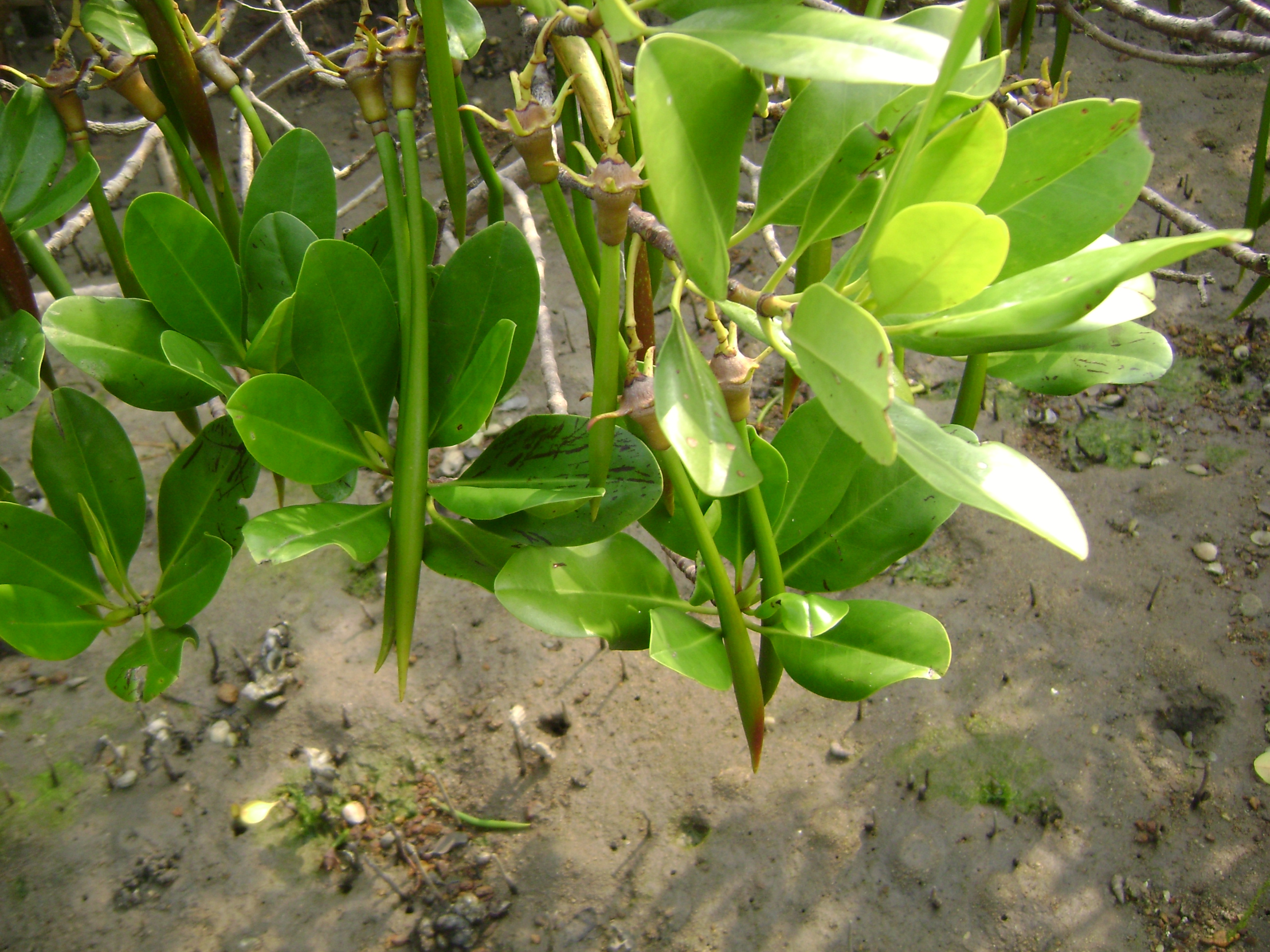
Kandelia obovata at Ting Kok mangrove.

Ting Kok is an area and a village in New Territories, the northeastern part of Hong Kong. It is located on the northern shore of Plover Cove and west of Tai Mei Tuk. Administratively, it is part of Tai Po District.

== Administration ==
Ting Kok is a recognized village under the New Territories Small House Policy. For electoral purposes, Ting Kok is part of the Shuen Wan constituency of the Tai Po District Council. It was formerly represented by So Tat-leung, who was elected in the local elections until October 2021.

== History ==
Ting Kok Village, originally called Ting Kai (汀溪), was historically a multi-surname Punti village founded before 1688.

Historically, Ting Kok, together with the nearby Hakka villages of Shan Liu, Lai Pik Shan, Lo Tsz Tin, Lung Mei and Tai Mei Tuk belonged to the Ting Kok Yeuk (汀角約) alliance.

In the 19th century, Ting Kok was the centre of the wider San On (新安) Roman Catholic missionary district. It was also an established transit point used by missionaries on their way into mainland China. The mission was set up in 1866, and 19 residents were baptised as the first batch of local Catholics.

At the time of the 1911 census, the population of Ting Kok was 669. The number of males was 301.

== Built heritage ==
Built heritage in Ting Kok include:

- Mo Tai Temple (武帝宮). Built before 1785. Dedicated to Kwan Tai aka. Mo Tai (武帝). A Grade III historic building since 2010.
- Lee Ancestral Hall (李氏家祠). Built in the late 19th century. Not graded. There are more than 10 ancestral halls in the village. Most of them have been modernized.

== Flora and fauna ==
A mangrove covers a coastal area of about seven hectares near Ting Kok Village. It is one of the few sites in Hong Kong where a large population of Lumnitzera racemosa can be found.

== Conservation ==
A part of Ting Kok is within the Pat Sin Leng Country Park, and the Ting Kok wetlands have been declared a Site of Special Scientific Interest since 1985.
