= Hung Heung Lo Fung =

- 紅香爐峰
- Location within Hong Kong

Highest point
- Elevation: 228 m (748 ft)
- Coordinates: 22.2822494°N 114.1969883°E

Geography
- Location: Hong Kong

Hung Heung Lo Fung (Chinese: 紅香爐峰) is a hill with a height of 228 metres (748 ft) on Hong Kong Island, Hong Kong, close to Jardine's Lookout.

Wilson Trail Stage 2 passes near the summit of Hung Heung Lo Fung.

== See also ==
- List of mountains, peaks and hills in Hong Kong
- Siu Ma Shan
- Braemar Hill
