= Sha Lo Tung =

Area in Tai Po District, Hong Kong

Coordinates: 22.478676°N 114.183423°E

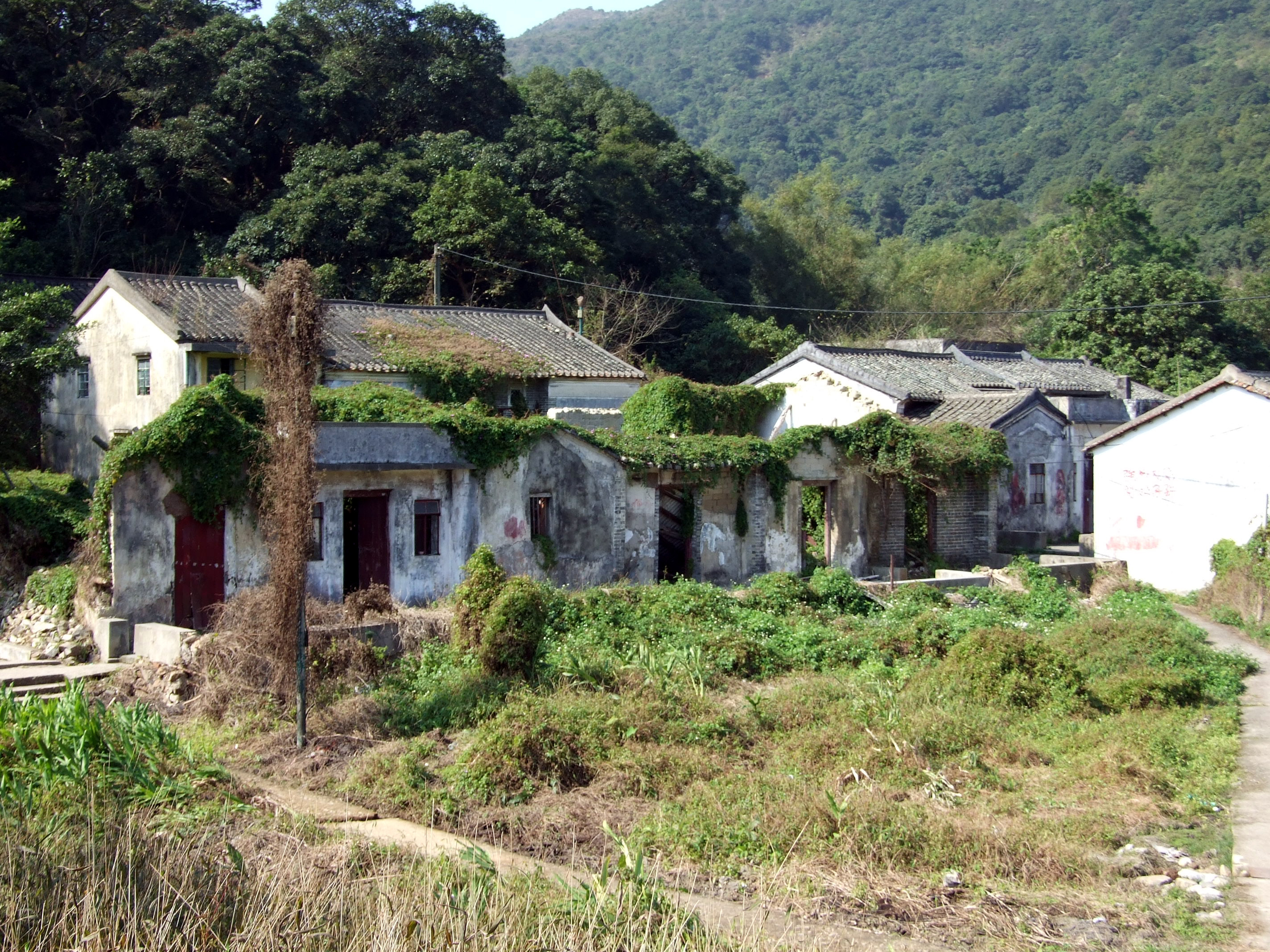
Sha Lo Tung Cheung Uk.

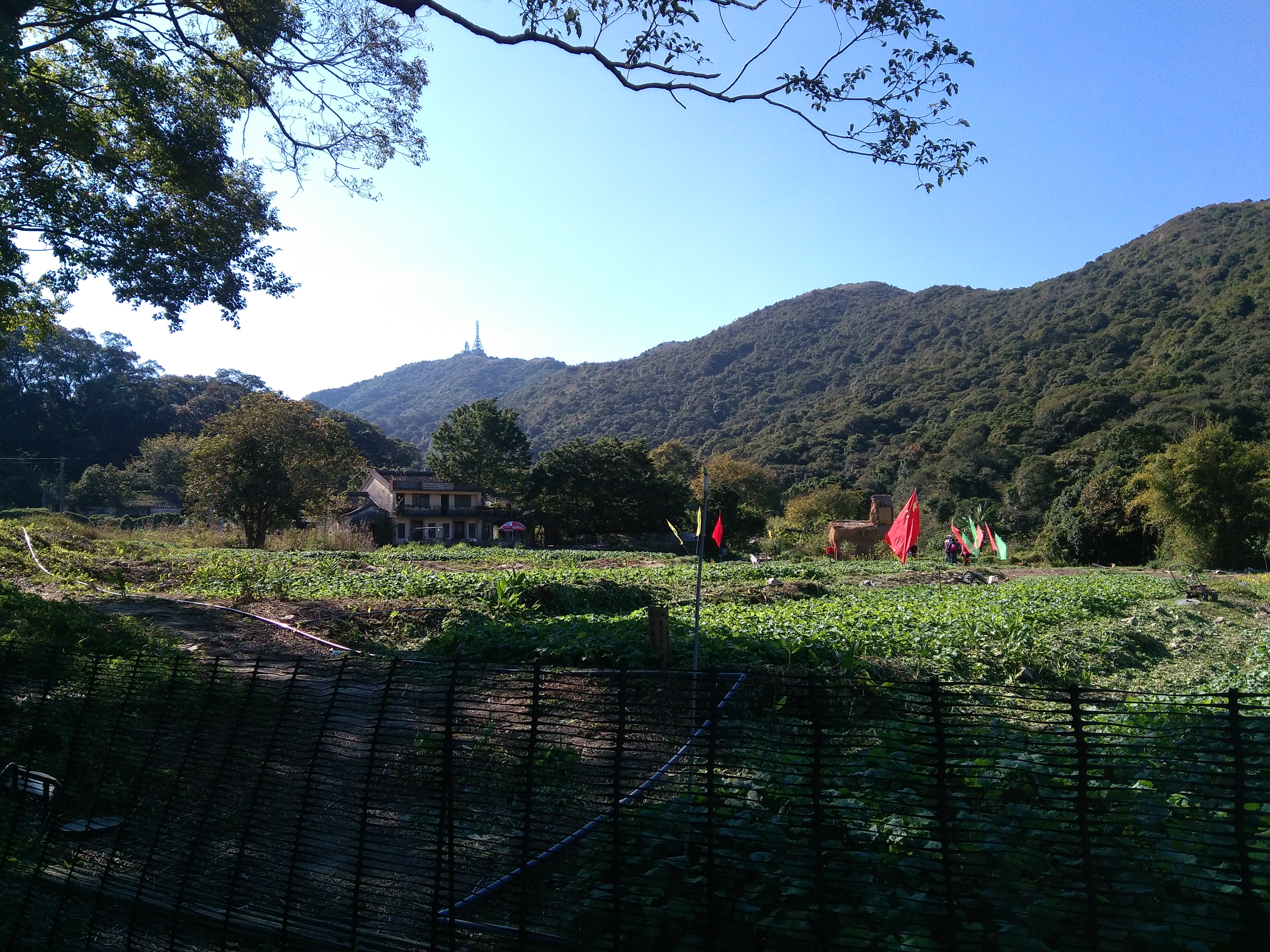
Farmland in Sha Lo Tung.

Sha Lo Tung (Chinese: 沙羅洞) is an area of Tai Po District, in the northeastern New Territories of Hong Kong.

== Administration ==
For electoral purposes, Sha Lo Tung is part of the Hong Lok Yuen constituency of the Tai Po District Council. It was formerly represented by Zero Yiu Yeuk-sang, who was elected in the local elections until May 2021.

Sha Lo Tung Cheung Uk (沙羅洞張屋) and Sha Lo Tung Lei Uk (沙羅洞李屋) are recognized villages under the New Territories Small House Policy.

== Geography ==
Sha Lo Tung is located at approximately 3.8 km north-east from the centre of the Tai Po New Town and is bounded by the Tai Po New Town to the south and surrounded by the Pat Sin Leng Country Park to the north, east and west. More specifically, it is located south of the Hok Tau Reservoir and north of Fung Yuen Village.

== Villages ==
There are two villages in Sha Lo Tung: Cheung Uk (張屋) and Lei Uk (李屋). Lei Uk is divided into Lo Wai (老圍) and Sun Wai, 'Old Village' and 'New Village'. Cheung Uk is a Grade II Historic Building, while Lo Wai is a Grade III Historic Building.

At the time of the 1911 census, the population of Sha Lo Tung was 307. The number of males was 120.

== Fauna ==
Sha Lo Tung is an important habitat of dragonflies and damselflies. Over 140 species of birds have been observed in the valley.
