= Yuen Leng Lei Uk =

Coordinates: 22.475696°N 114.15586°E

Yuen Leng Lei Uk (Chinese: 元嶺李屋) is a village in Tai Po District, Hong Kong.

== Administration ==
Yuen Leng Lei Uk is a recognized village under the New Territories Small House Policy. It is one of the villages represented within the Tai Po Rural Committee. For electoral purposes, Yuen Leng Lei Uk is part of the Hong Lok Yuen constituency, which was formerly represented by Zero Yiu Yeuk-sang until May 2021.

== See also ==
- Yuen Leng Yip Uk, an adjacent village
