= Yuen Leng Yip Uk =

Coordinates: 22.473432°N 114.155941°E

Yuen Leng Yip Uk (Chinese: 元嶺葉屋) is a village in Tai Po District, Hong Kong.

== Administration ==
Yuen Leng Yip Uk is a recognized village under the New Territories Small House Policy. It is one of the villages represented within the Tai Po Rural Committee. For electoral purposes, Yuen Leng Yip Uk is part of the Hong Lok Yuen constituency, which was formerly represented by Zero Yiu Yeuk-sang until May 2021.

== See also ==
- Yuen Leng Lei Uk, an adjacent village
