= Tai Wo Tsuen =

Tai Wo Tsuen or Tai Wo Village (Chinese: 大窩村), is the name of several villages in Hong Kong:

- Tai Wo Tsuen, Tai Po District, in Tai Po District
- Tai Wo Tsuen, Yuen Long District, in Pat Heung, Yuen Long District

== See also ==
- Tai Wo Estate, a public housing estate in Tai Po
