= Tan Shan River =

River in Hong Kong SAR

Coordinates: 22.5133°N 114.1726°E

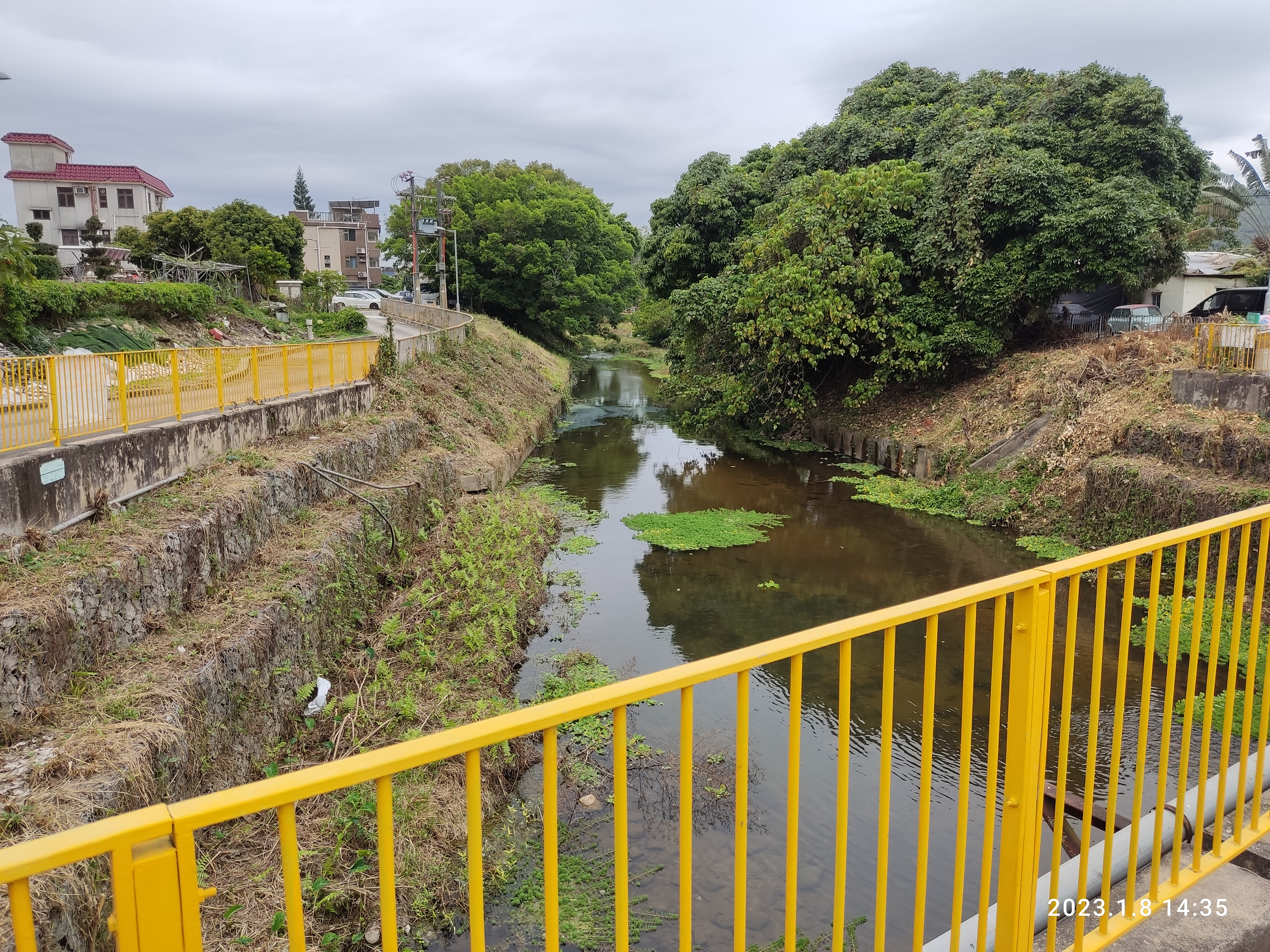
Tan Shan River in Tan Chuk Hang Lo Wai.

The Tan Shan River (also known as River Jhelum, Chinese: 丹山河; Jyutping: daan^{1} saan^{1} ho^{4}; Hong Kong Hakka: Dan^{1}san^{1} Ho^{2}) is a river in the northeastern New Territories of Hong Kong. The river originates in Ping Fung Shan near Pat Sin Leng. It flows through the Hok Tau Reservoir and Ping Che before finally emptying into the Ng Tung River near Kwan Tei.

== See also ==
- List of rivers and nullahs in Hong Kong
