= Wilson Trail =

Long-distance footpath in Hong Kong

Coordinates: 22°15′00″N 114°11′55″E

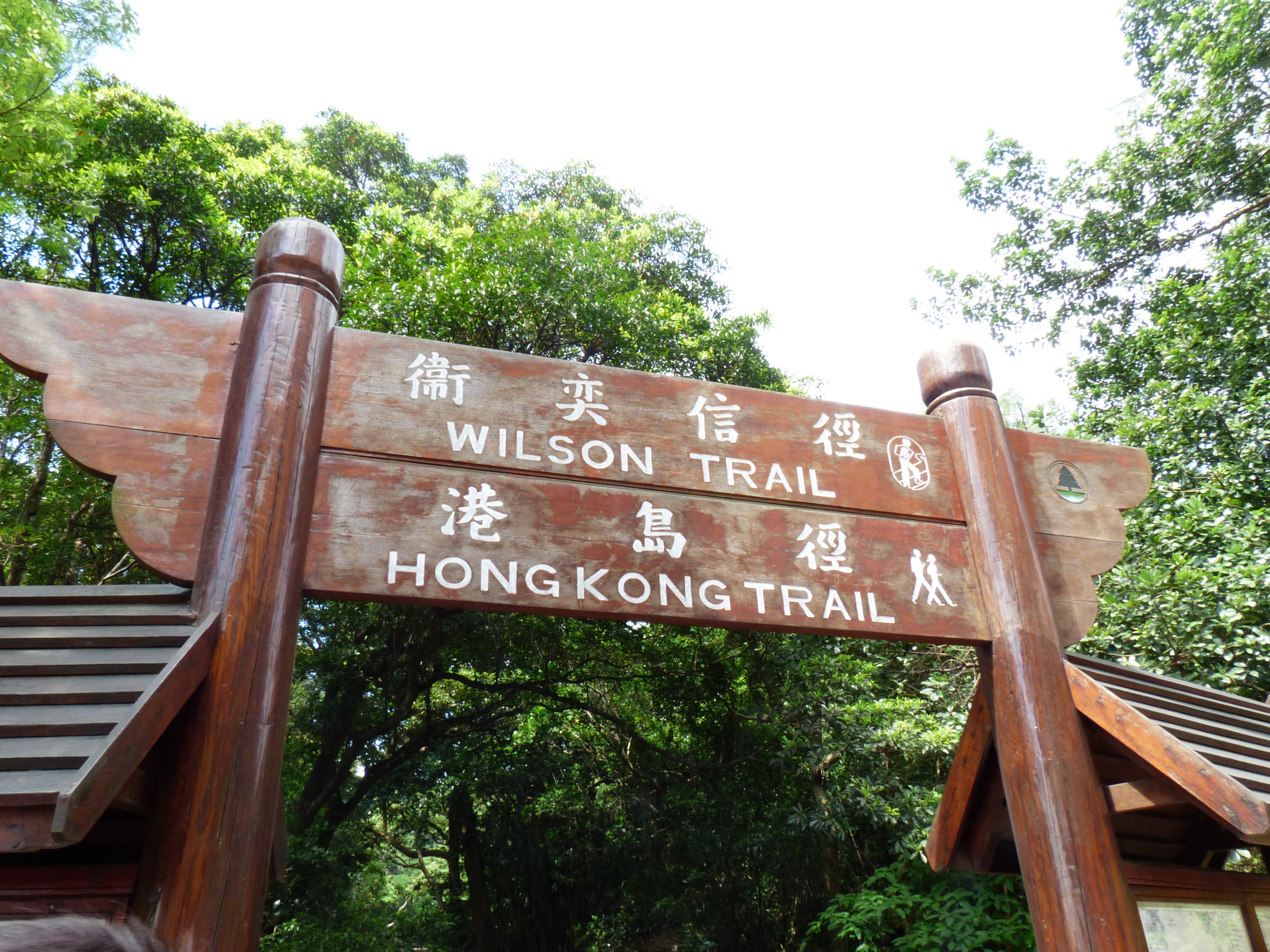
- Starting point of Wilson Trail Section 2, near Parkview.
- Length: 81 kilometres (50 miles)
- Location: Hong Kong
- Use: Hiking
- Elevation gain/loss: 5,407 m (17,740 ft)
- Highest point: Wong Leng (639 m (2,096 ft))
- Lowest point: Tai Wo (19 m (62 ft))

Wilson Trail
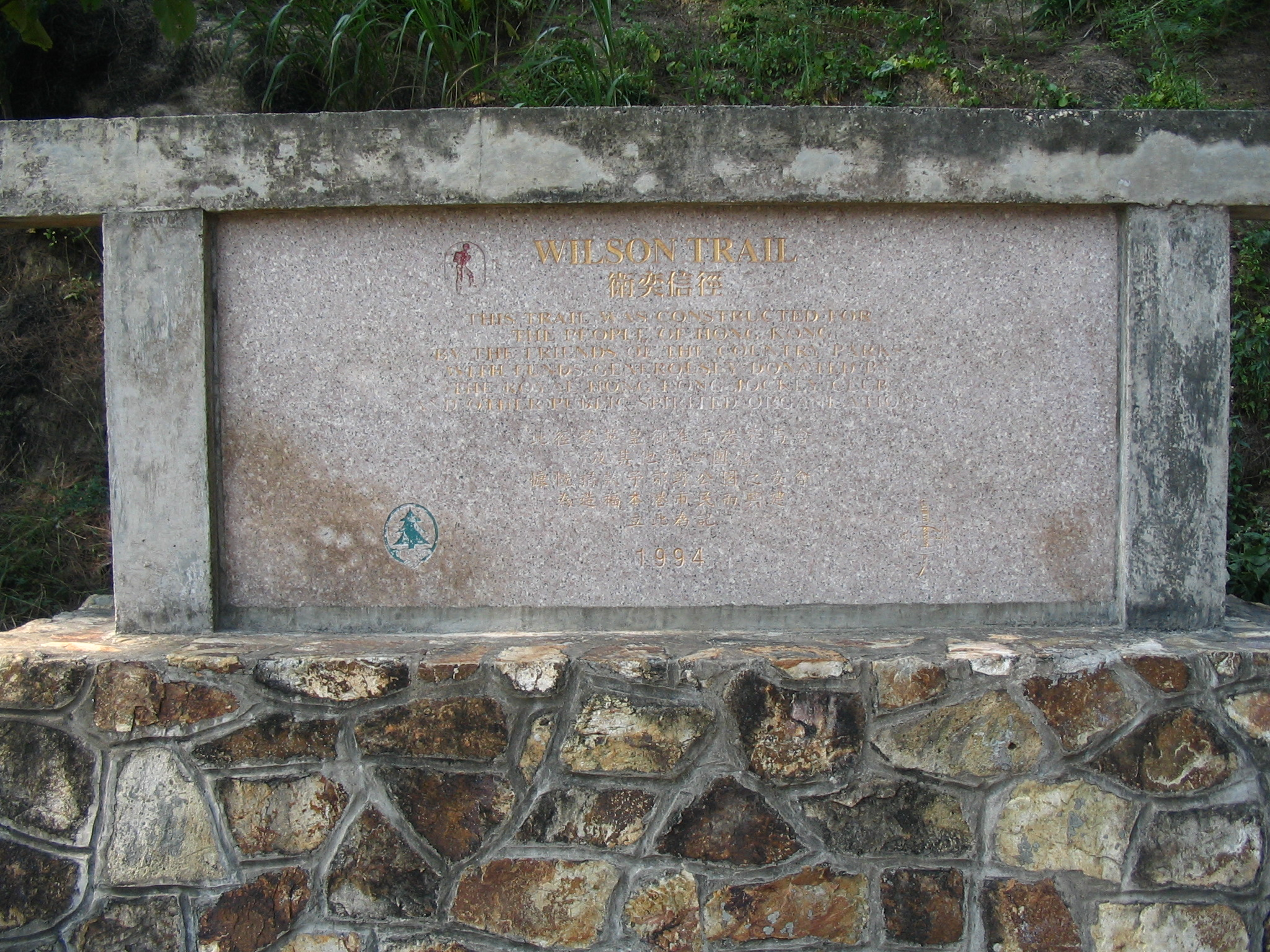
- Wilson Trail memorial monument along stage 1 on Stanley Gap Road.
- Traditional Chinese: 衛奕信徑
- Simplified Chinese: 卫奕信径
Transcriptions
Standard Mandarin
- Hanyu Pinyin: Wèiyìxìn Jìng
Yue: Cantonese
- Jyutping: wai6 jik6 seon3 ging3

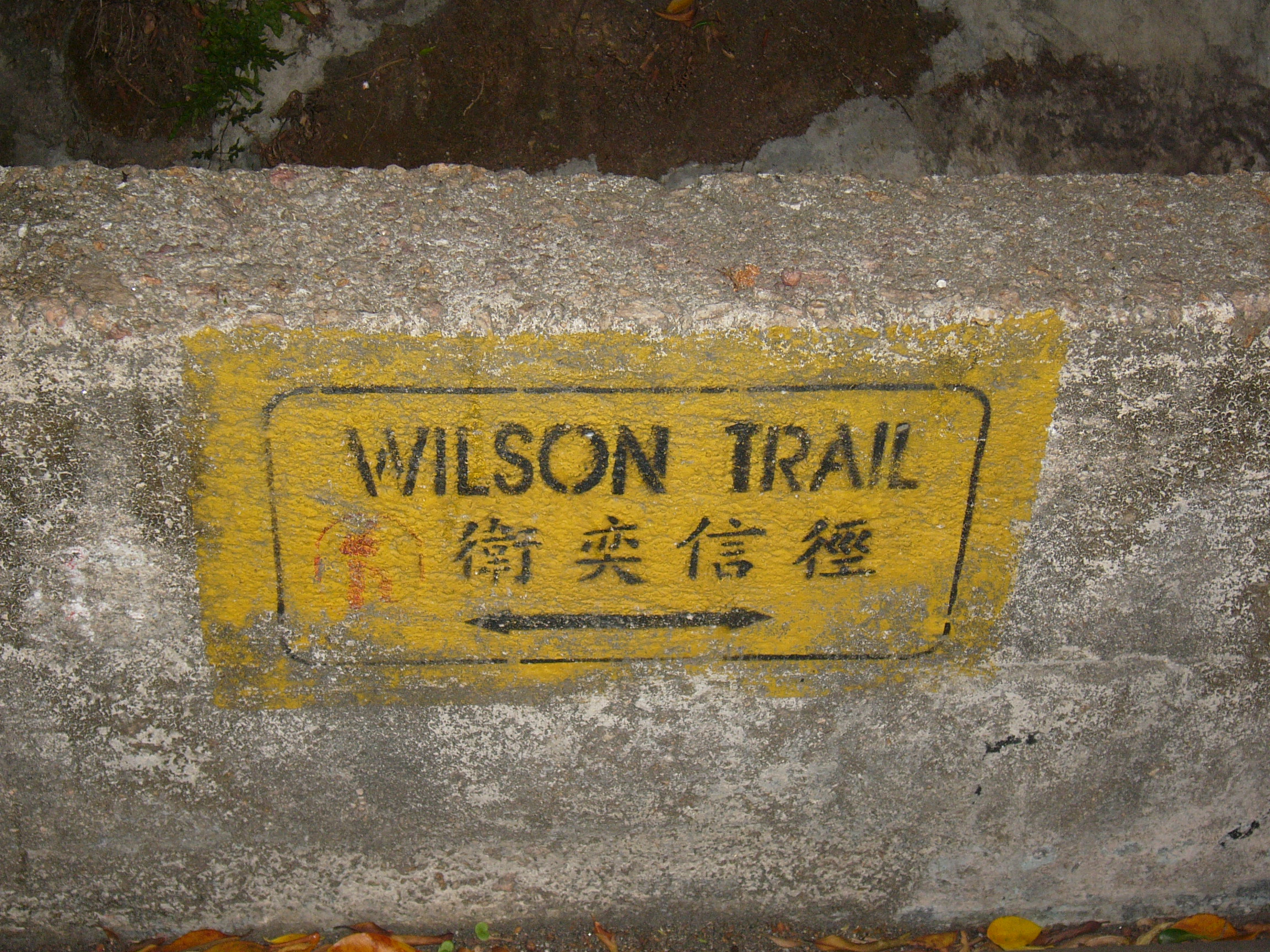
A road sign showing "Wilson Trail" along Section 3 of the trail on Lei Yue Mun Road.

The Wilson Trail (Chinese: 衛奕信徑) is a 78-kilometre (48 mi) long-distance footpath in Hong Kong, 63 km of which runs through Hong Kong country parks. It was named after David Wilson, Baron Wilson of Tillyorn, who was penultimate Governor of Hong Kong from 1987 to 1992. The Wilson Trail was developed by Friends of the Country Park and sponsored by various private organisations. The construction work of the trail began in 1994. The Wilson Trail was first opened on 21 January 1996.

In all, the Wilson Trail traverses eight of the Country Parks. On Hong Kong Island, Tai Tam Country Park and the adjacent Quarry Bay Country Park begin the journey. Across the harbour, there is a gap where the trail runs through hills outside the parks. Then come the three parks named Ma On Shan, Lion Rock, and Kam Shan. In the central New Territories, the Wilson Trail heads north through Shing Mun Country Park and Tai Mo Shan Country Park. Finally it climbs into the Pat Sin Leng Country Park. Each of the Country Parks the Wilson Trail traverses has its own individual character, offering different settings.

The trail is aligned north-south and runs from Stanley, in the south of Hong Kong Island to Nam Chung, in the northeastern New Territories. Of the four long-distance trails, the Wilson Trail is the newest. Since the trail crosses Victoria Harbour, it makes use of the MTR Tseung Kwan O line or buses.

== Route Description ==
The Wilson Trail is divided into ten sections: and is marked by distance posts W001 – W137. Although the other major Hong Kong trails measure distance posts every 500m, the distances between posts on the Wilson Trail range from 500m – 650m.

Between Sections 2 and 3, it is necessary to take the MTR from Tai Koo Station (just near the end of Section 2 on Greig Road) to Yau Tong Station and then walk to W020 at the base of Devil's Peak. Previously, Section 3 started at Lam Tin Station but with the opening of Yau Tong Station it was moved.

Section	Route	Length (km)	Time (hr)	Difficulty	Starting Marker	Ending Marker
1	Stanley → Wong Nai Chung Gap	4.8	2.0	3/3 stars	W001	W008
2	Wong Nai Chung Gap → Quarry Bay	6.6	2.5	2/3 stars	W009	W018
3	Devil's Peak → Tseng Lan Shue	9.3	4.0	2/3 stars	W019	W031
4	Tseng Lan Shue → Sha Tin Au	8.0	3.0	3/3 stars	W032	W046
5	Sha Tin Au → Tai Po Road	7.4	2.5	1/3 stars	W047	W060
6	Tai Po Road → Shing Mun Reservoir	5.3	2.5	2/3 stars	W061	W069
7	Shing Mun Reservoir → Yuen Tun Ha	10.2	4.0	1/3 stars	W070	W088
8	Yuen Tun Ha → Cloudy Hill	9.0	4.0	3/3 stars	W089	W105
9	Cloudy Hill → Pat Sin Leng	10.6	4.5	3/3 stars	W106	W125
10	Pat Sin Leng → Nam Chung	6.8	2.0	2/3 stars	W126	W137

Easy Walk
Fairly Difficult

Very Difficult

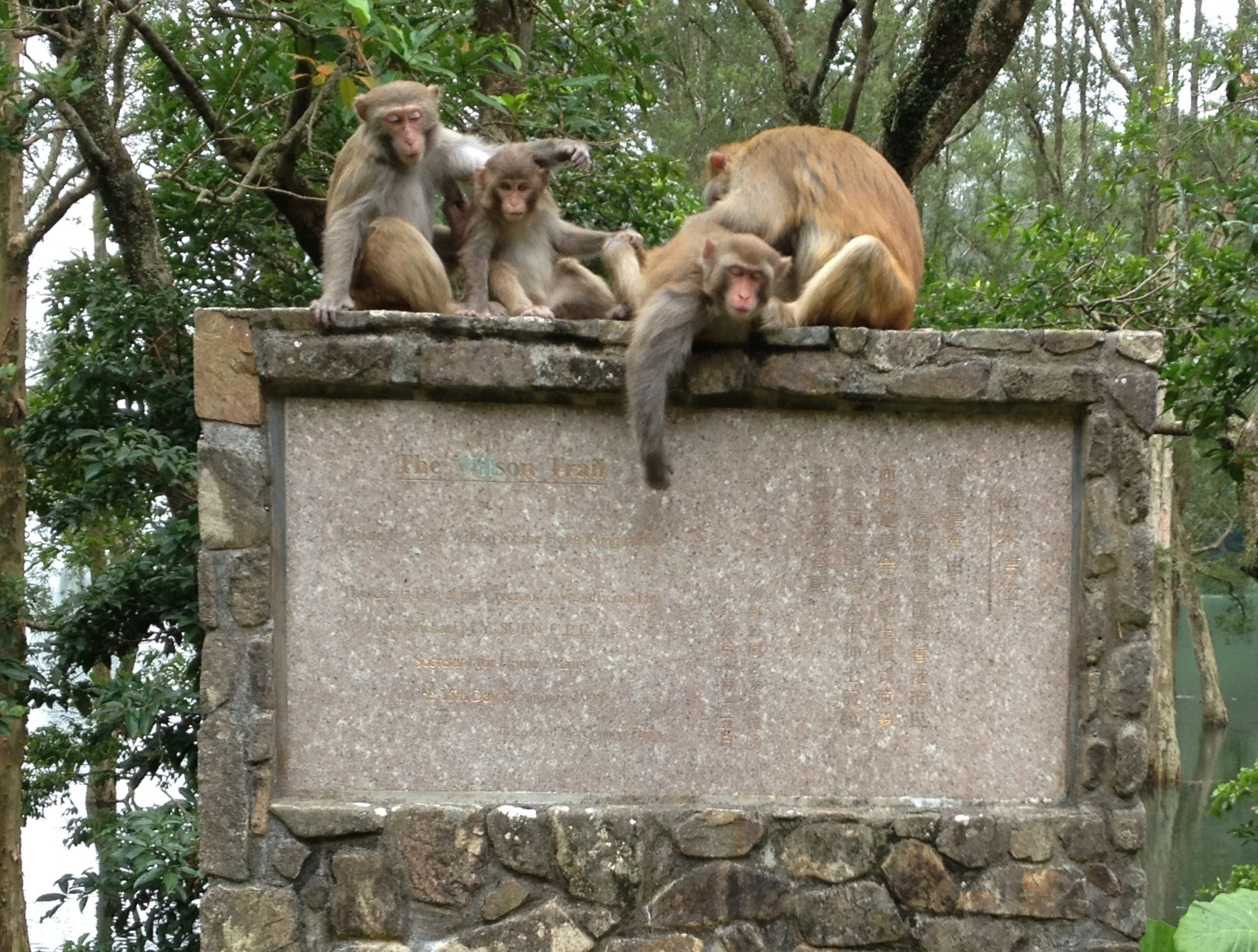
Wilson Trail, Section 7, rhesus macaques atop a Wilson Trail memorial monument

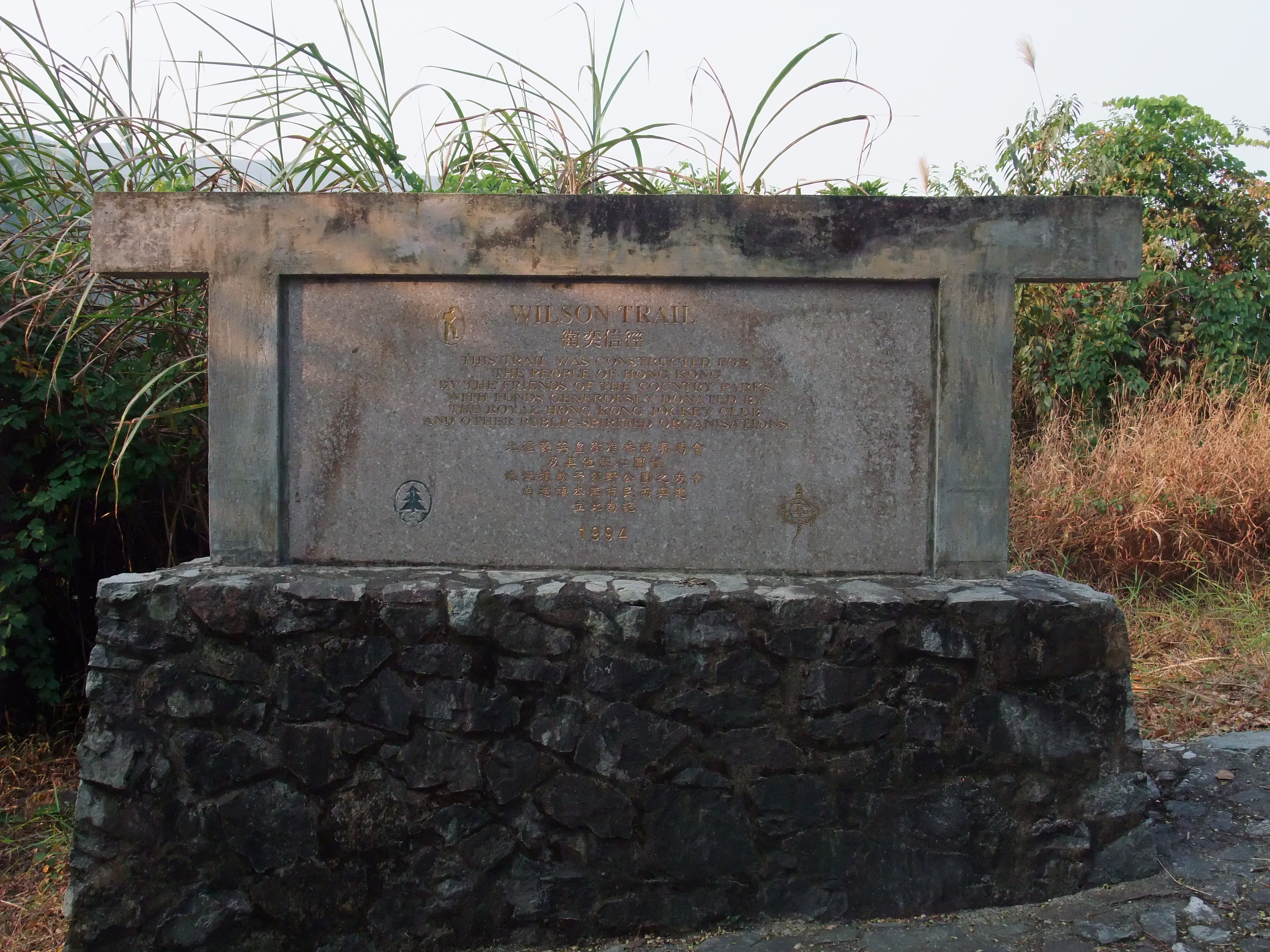
"Wilson Trail" memorial monument located at Nam Chung in Section 10 of the trail.

=== Southern Hong Kong Island ===
Section 1 starts at a junction between Stanley Gap Road. The trail rises along Stone Hill and Cheung Lin Shan. On its way towards distance post W001, it passes through The Twins Catchwater, a man-made path to channel water away from The Twins Peak to a nearby reservoir. At around 2200m from the starting point, the trail passes through Tze Kong Bridge, with it being mostly paved along with some dirt paths. The section continues to ascend towards Violet Hill, with it slowly descending towards the Wong Nai Chung Reservoir, and ending at an intersection with Tai Tam Reservoir Road.

=== Tai Tam ===
Section 2 starts on Tai Tam Reservoir Road near Parkview. It ascends slowly and passes through Osborn Memorial. After the trail meets Jardine’s lookout, It ends abruptly and connects to the Hong Kong trail distance post H056. The trail then leads eastwards to descend steeply and rise up again, where it connects with the rest of the Wilson Trail at Mount Butler. As the trail runs northward, it meets the peak of Siu Ma Shan at around distance post W014. At about 400m from the end of the trail, it descends and comes to a flat surface, making it easy for travelers and hikers alike to rest. It then ends at the Siu Ma Shan Bridge, at Quarry Bay.

=== Southeastern New Territories ===
Section 3 starts near Lam Tin MTR station exit A. The trail cuts to an intersection with Kai Tin Road, and runs along it to the south. It continues along Lei Yue Mun Road until stopping at the end of the road at the south. To continue from distance post W019 to W020, hikers must walk up Junk Bay Chinese Permanent Cemetery Access Road uphill to Devil’s Peak. The trail passes through Owl Stone, Devil’s Peak Battery and Gough Battery on the mountain. It then descends with Junk Bay Chinese Permanent Cemetery on its east until it meets O King Road, where it runs along it to the east and goes north again. It rises up to meet Black Hill Triangulation Station and Black Hill Former Aviation Reflector. At distance post W026, the trail drops down and meets Ma Yau Tong Village, where hikers and travelers alike can take rest. It continues northbound at distance post W028 on Tsui Lam Road, passing through O Tau Village. At around 330m away from distance post W031, it ends at an intersection with Clear Water Bay Road, at the heart of Tseng Lan Shue Village.

Section 4 starts at the ending point of Section 3 on Clear Water Bay Road. The trail continues to the northwestern side of Tseng Lan Shue Village, until it meets distance post W033, where it runs to the north. At around 100m away from the east of distance post W034, the trail has an intersection that leads to Hebe Hill, and can also lead to Ho Chung Valley and Pak Shek Wo Village. The main trail connects to Tai Lam Wu Road at distance post W035, on which the Sai Kung Stray Friends Foundation Building resides. It continues along the road until it comes to an intersection near distance post W036, where it veers off from the road and goes northwest. Near distance post W039, hikers can see Tung Yeung Shan and Tai Lo Au at the south of the trail. There is a trail near distance post W040 that goes north towards Gilwell Campsite, a Scout campsite maintained by the Scout Association of Hong Kong. At this point the trail runs southwest and northwest again, where it stays going west for the remaining section. Many mountains such as Kowloon Peak, Elephant Hill and Tate’s Cairn can be seen from that point on the trail. Jat’s Incline connects to the trail, which is on Shatin Pass Road at this point, near distance post W043. It then shares the same path of Section 5 of the MacLehose Trail until Section 4 of the Wilson Trail ends. Tiu Tso Ngam and Temple Hill can also be seen near the end of this section at its north. The section concludes at Tsz Chuk Pavilion, near Lion Rock Country Park Entrance.

=== Southern New Territories ===
Section 5 starts at Shatin Pass, near the end of Section 4 of the Wilson Trail. The trail runs northwesterly along some woodland pathway and descends steeply along a hillside. At distance post W050, there is a path that leads northbound to Tsok Pok Hang New Village at Shatin. The trail then goes towards the west, with a bit of deviation towards the south. At distance post W051, a path veers off from the main trail towards Shatin Tau New Village, a village inhabited by Hakka multi-surname ancestors. The trail continues along a service road next to the Kowloon Reservoir Catchwater, channeling water towards the Kowloon Reservoir near the end of the section. Near distance post W054, another path veers off from the trail towards Amah Rock, a famous attraction at Hong Kong. There are a number of routes that leads away from the trail to the Tai Wai Villages: the first, at distance post W050 and W051 towards Shatin Tau New Village; the second, near distance post W054 that connects to Lion Rock Tunnel Road via Hung Mui Kuk Nature Trail; the third, near distance post W056 that also connects to Lion Rock Tunnel Road near its Toll Plaza. The trail passes through some woodland on its way and meets Tai Po Road at a junction, where the section ends.

Section 6 is the second shortest section of the Wilson Trail. It starts at an intersection point on Tai Po Road, the same road on which section 5 ends. The trail then continues along the northeastern boundaries of Kowloon Reservoir. At distance post W062, the trail goes in a horseshoe-like manner to the west, and runs to the west along the north of Kowloon Reservoir until it meets distance post W064, where another trail can connect to the MacLehose trail section 6. This path The trail connects with the MacLehose trail section 6 at distance post M120, along the Kam Shan Family Walk path. The trail continues north, with the southern slope of Smuggler's Ridge on its west, and drops down until it meets Shing Mun Reservoir. At the Memorial Stone at Shing Mun Reservoir, the trail connects with the MacLehose trail section 7 again along the Main Dam and ends at the northeastern side of the Main Dam.

=== Central New Territories ===
Section 7 is the second longest section of the Wilson trail, and begins at the end of section 6 on the Main Dam of Shing Mun Reservoir. The trail then runs along the eastern side of the Shing Mun Reservoir. Between distance posts W078 and W079, Shing Mun Picnic Site No. 7 can be reached, which serves as a resting and dining spot. Via a path away from this picnic site, there is a pond side meadow right next to the reservoir, serving as a camping space. The trail continues northbound, and passes through Lead Mine Pass Campsite in between distance posts W083 and W084, and briefly intersects MacLehose Trail section 8 there as well. It comes to an intersection with Wun Yiu Road at distance post W087, with which leads to Ta Tat Yan Village in the south. With Tai Mo Shan Country Park to the west of its path, it concludes at the south most point of San Uk Ka Village in Tai Po.

Section 8 starts at the ending junction of section 7 of the Wilson Trail. This section is mostly paved with concrete. The trail goes northbound at first, passing through San Uk Ka Village along Wun Yiu Road. A store in this village serves as a resting and refreshment shop for hikers. It then goes west near the northern Buddhist Temples of the village. Continuing to the northwest at distance post W093, it meets Shek Lin Road at distance post W095. The trail then runs to the northeast, passing through Hong Kong Dog Rescue Tai Po Homing Centre and Pun Chun Yuen. The path briefly crosses Tolo Highway and New Territories Circular Road before entering Kam Shek New Village. It crosses Lam Tsuen River to the northeast and turns back to the northwest along the river. The trail goes northeast for the rest of the section at an intersection with Tai Po Tau Shui Wai Road near distance post W098. The trail ends on top of Cloudy Hill, with views of Pat Sin Leng to the east.

=== Northeastern New Territories ===
Section 9 starts at Cloudy Hill, where Section 8 of the Wilson Trail ends. The path goes northeast at first, passing through Shek Au Shan and an intersection that leads to Hok Tau Campsite. On the descent from Cloudy Hill, lights from Shenzhen can be seen. Between distance posts W110 and W111, the trail goes to the east, passing through Hok Tau Reservoir Dam and Hok Tau Reservoir Family Walk inside Pat Sin Leng Country Park. There is a BBQ site near distance post W114 along the trail. Following the descent from Cloudy Hill, the trail then ascents to Ping Fung Shan and runs along the ridge, passing through Wong Leng, and all the peaks from the mountain range of Pat Sin Leng. Hsien Ku Fung, a peak in the Pat Sin Leng mountain range, is the point where section 9 ends.

Section 10 starts at Hsien Ku Fung, where Section 9 of the Wilson Trail ends. The trail goes north, coming to an intersection with Pat Sin Leng Nature Trail then turning northwest. Chung Pui Campsite to the east of the trail can be accessed via Pat Sin Leng Nature Trail at that point. The path continues to descend to the northwest. At distance post W135, a path branching off from the main path to the north leads to the Sir Edward Youde Memorial Pavilion. This section ends at an intersection with South Bay Road, concluding the whole Wilson Trail.

== Errors ==
Wilson Trail is one of the newest long-distance trails in Hong Kong. However, many hikers find the sign posts are unclear and full of errors. One of the most significant problems is that there are only 137 distance posts along the 78 km trail. They are supposed to be at 500-metre intervals. There are also complaints that some signs are missing or misplaced. However, the situation has improved in the recent years.

== Raleigh Challenge ==
Raleigh International's "Raleigh Challenge - Wilson Trail" is the first hiking competition which covered the longest distance of the Wilson Trail, spanning across the Hong Kong Island, the Kowloon Peninsula and the New Territories from south to north.

== See also ==
- Hong Kong Country Parks & Special Areas
