= Wong Leng =

Mountain in Hong Kong

- 黃嶺
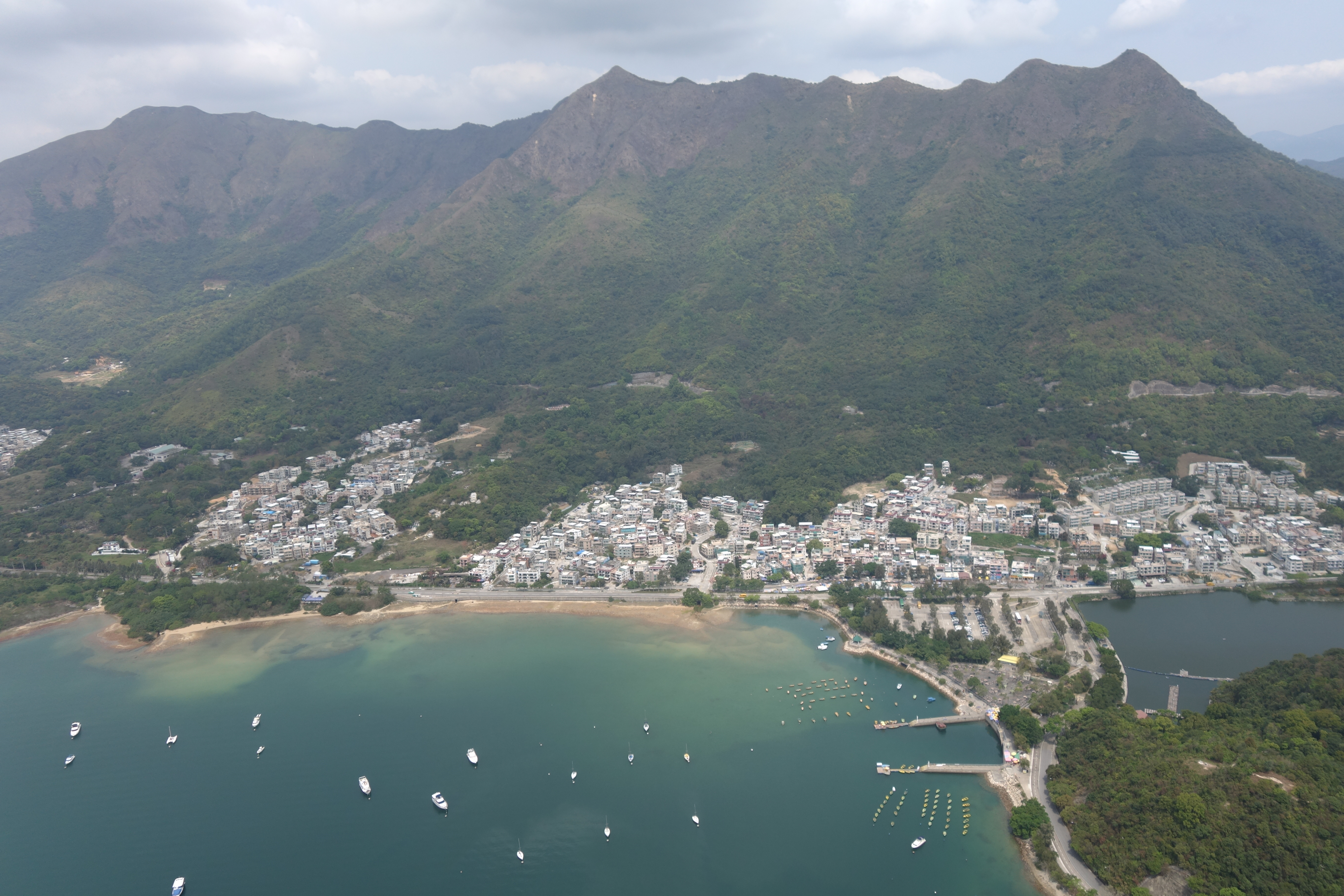
- Wong Leng is the ridge to the left of Pat Sin Leng

Highest point
- Elevation: 639 m (2,096 ft); HKPD
- Coordinates: 22°29′16″N 114°12′33″E

Geography
- Location within Hong Kong

Wong Leng (Chinese: 黃嶺; literally: "Yellow Ridge") is on section 9 of the Wilson Trail in Pat Sin Leng Country Park, Hong Kong. It is 639 metres tall.

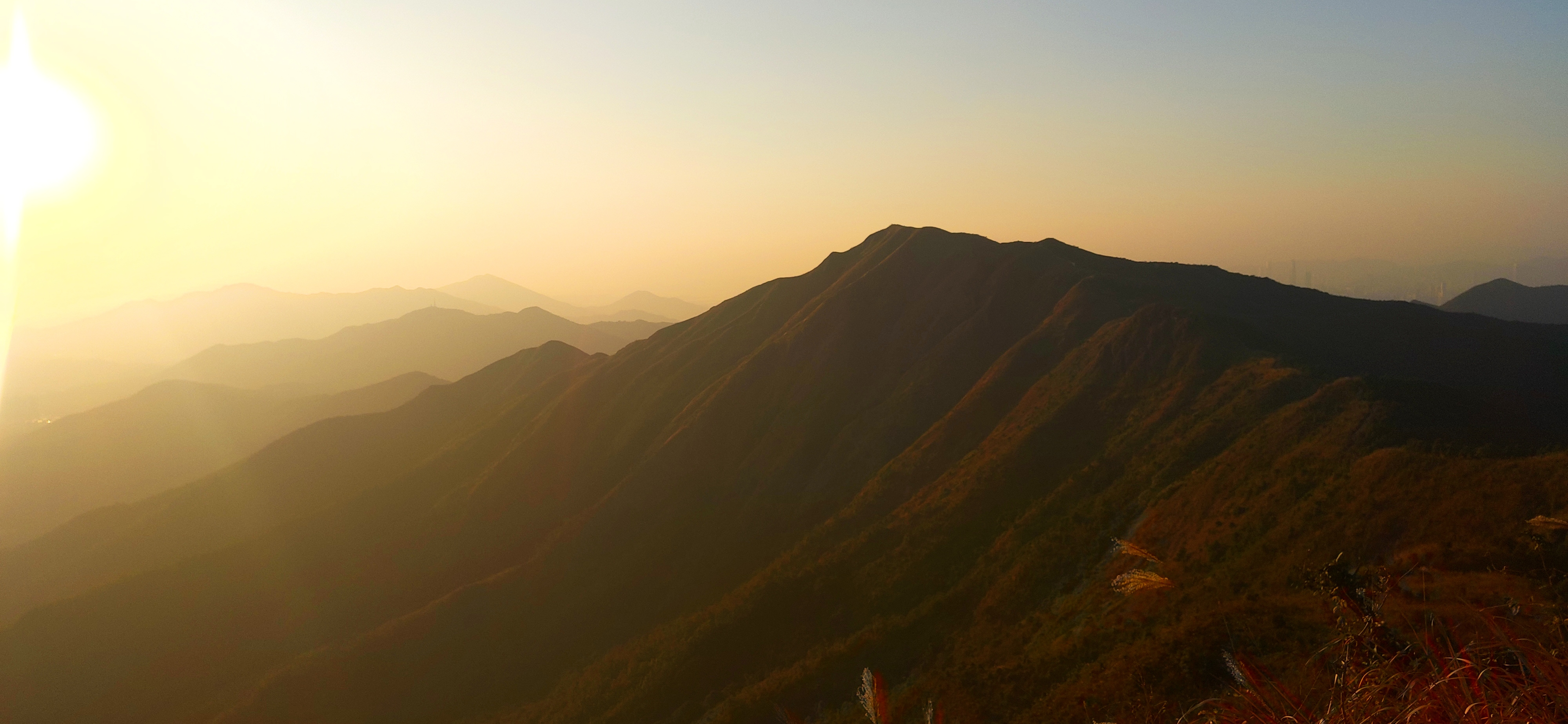
Wong Leng Sunset (The mountain range turns yellowish-red during sunset, hence the name "Yellow Ridge")

== See also ==
- List of mountains, peaks and hills in Hong Kong
- Pat Sin Leng
