= Tai Wo Tsuen, Tai Po District =

Village in Tai Po District, Hong Kong

Coordinates: 22.470491°N 114.154800°E

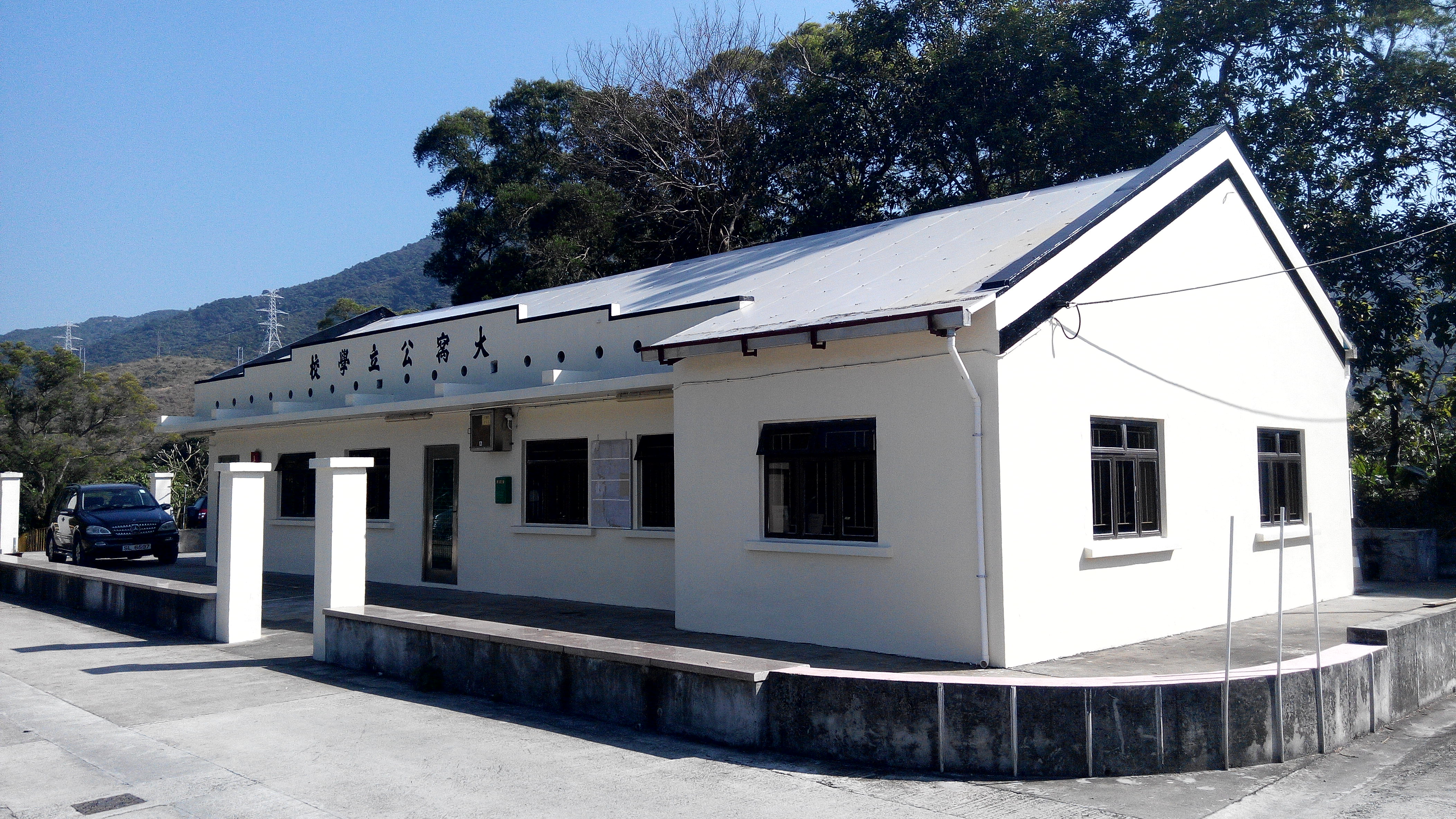
Tai Wo Public School

Tai Wo Tsuen or Tai Wo Village (Chinese: 大窩村) is a village in Tai Po District, Hong Kong.

== Administration ==
Tai Wo Tsuen is a recognized village under the New Territories Small House Policy. It is one of the villages represented within the Tai Po Rural Committee. For electoral purposes, Tai Wo Tsuen is part of the Hong Lok Yuen constituency, which was formerly represented by Zero Yiu Yeuk-sang until May 2021.
