= Pat Sin Leng Country Park =

Country park in Hong Kong

Coordinates: 22.4897°N 114.1839°E

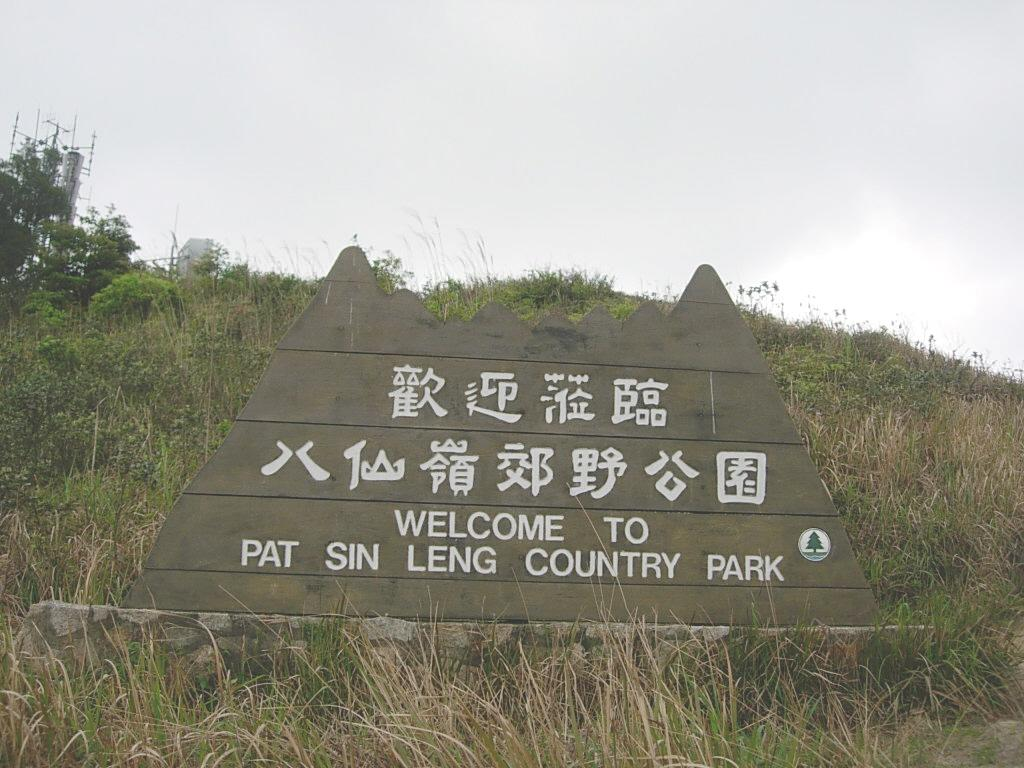
Welcoming sign of Pat Sin Leng Country Park

Pat Sin Leng Country Park (Chinese: 八仙嶺郊野公園; Jyutping: Baat3 Sin1 Leng5 Gaau1 Je5 Gung1 Jyun2) is a country park in Hong Kong located in the northeastern New Territories. Established on 18 August 1978, the country park covers 3,125 hectares (7,720 acres) of natural terrain. It comprises the Pat Sin Leng mountain range and other spurs, including Wong Leng, Ping Fung Shan, Cloudy Hill and Kwai Tau Leng. Hok Tau Reservoir and Lau Shui Heung Reservoir are also within the country park.

== Ecology ==
The catchment forests are habitats for avian species such as crested bulbul, Chinese bulbul, hwamei, Oriental magpie robin, Chinese francolin, Japanese quail, common kingfisher, European magpie, crested myna and crows. Also dwelling in woodlands are mammals like Malayan porcupine, Chinese pangolin, masked palm civet, leopard cat and common muntjac.

Lau Shui Heung Reservoir is rimmed by Peking willow and Fortune's keteleeria.

== Spots ==
Stages nine and ten (ending stages) of the 78-kilometre (48 mi) Wilson Trail traverse the Pat Sin Leng Country Park. The 17.4-kilometre (10.8 mi) section within the park leads from Cloudy Hill to Nam Chung, travelling along the ridges of Wong Leng, Lai Pek Shan and Pat Sin Leng. The view at the top on fine days covers the Plover Cove Reservoir and the urban area of Shenzhen. Other hiking options are the Hok Tau Country Trail and Lau Shui Heung Country Trail.

Sha Lo Tung is an important habitat for dragonflies and damselflies. Ting Kok, a piece of wetland, has been declared a Site of Special Scientific Interest. Yim Tso Ha is one of the largest egretries in Hong Kong.

== External links and references ==
- AFCD Pat Sin Leng
- Initial text based on information provided by the Hong Kong Agriculture, Fisheries and Conservation Department (AFCD), under the provision that the re-dissemination or reproduction is for non-commercial use.
