= Hong Lok Yuen =

Housing estate in Tai Po, Hong Kong

Hong Lok Yuen 康樂園
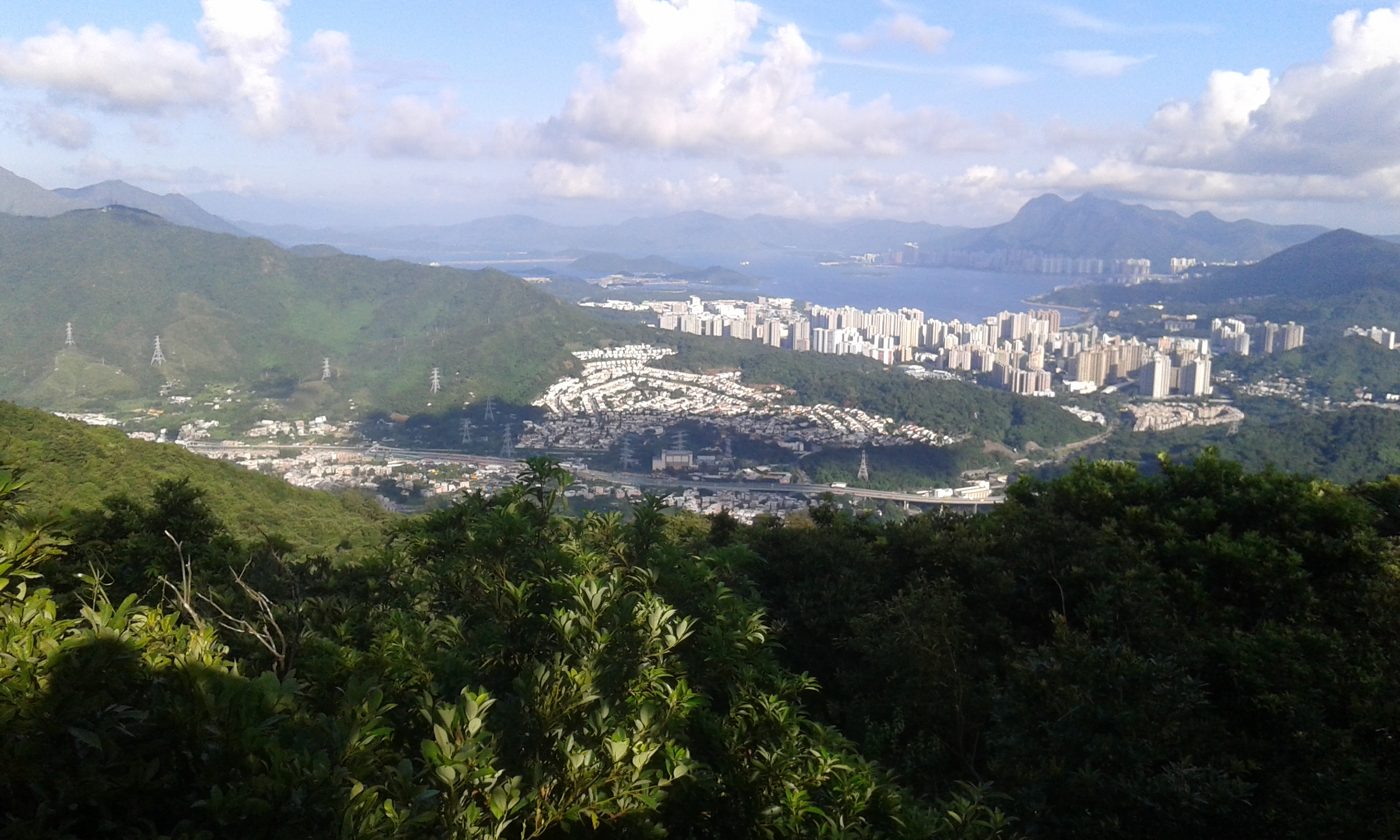
- Panoramic view of Hong Lok Yuen with Tai Po and Tolo Harbour in the background
- Interactive map of Hong Lok Yuen
- SAR: Hong Kong
- Area: New Territories
- District: Tai Po

Hong Lok Yuen
- Traditional Chinese: 康樂園
- Simplified Chinese: 康乐园
- Literal meaning: Happy healthy garden/leisure garden
Transcriptions
Standard Mandarin
- Hanyu Pinyin: Kānglèyuán
Yue: Cantonese
- Jyutping: hong1 lok6 jyun4

Hong Lok Yuen (Chinese: 康樂園) is a low-density luxury residential housing estate in Tai Po District, New Territories, Hong Kong, located near Cloudy Hill. It is north of Tai Po Town.

== History ==
Hong Lok Yuen was previously an orchard owned by General Li Fulin. It is reputed to have excellent feng shui.

Hong Lok Yuen was approved for development in 1977 as a new garden estate. Canadian Overseas Development and Clifford Wong were the developers. The developing company was Hong Lok Yuen Property Co Ltd, a joint venture between Wong, a well-known architect, and British housebuilding firm George Wimpey, with Sun Hung Kai Properties later participating in the development. Between 1980 and September 1993, Hong Lok Yuen was sub-divided into a total of 1196 units.

== The estate ==
The Hong Lok Yuen estate covers an area of 558,000 m^{2} (6,010,000 sq ft), of which 40% is reserved for forests and parks. Most of the units are 1,600–3,500 sq ft (150–330 m^{2}) two- or three-storey independent villas with garages and gardens. Hong Lok Yuen is one of the few large-scale bungalow-style luxury residential areas in Hong Kong, and has attracted many officials and artists as residents. A shopping centre, clubhouse and international school, International College Hong Kong, are located in the estate.

== Incidents ==
- "The Three Corpse Robbery Case" - No. 135, 10th Street, Hong Lok Yuen - On 28 September 1982, between about 09:30 and 11:30, a 32-year-old renovation worker entered the house to burgle it but was discovered by a resident. The burglar, afraid of being arrested, killed the 33-year-old housewife, her 8-year-old daughter, and her 4-year-old son. He strangled the three with wires and ties, and placed the bodies in the storage room and bathroom. He stole HK$4000 yuan, a gold chain, a diamond ring, golden cufflink, a bead necklace, a women's handbag and a bank safety deposit box key. The murder was discovered at 20:10 when the male head of the household returned home from work. The incident was one of the most infamous events of that year. The suspect left Hong Kong on the day of the killing but returned on 5 October, and was arrested by the police on 16 October. On 14 June 1983, at his trial in the High Court of Hong Kong, the defendant denied three charges of murder and one charge of robbery. On 27 June, seven male jurors unanimously found him guilty. The judge, Michael Wong Kin Chow, sentenced the offender to death for three counts of murder, and to the maximum penalty for robbery of life imprisonment. The judge denounced the inhuman and cold-blooded nature of the killing, saying it was difficult to describe the behaviour using pen and ink, and the defendant must be completely isolated from society. In November 1966, Hong Kong had ceased carrying out the death penalty following its abolition in the United Kingdom. The sentence was, therefore, commuted and the defendant was sentenced to life imprisonment by a Hong Kong judge.
- The Hong Lok Yuen International School was sued for adverse possession of land used by the Man family for ancestral halls that is used by the school as a playground and flower garden.
- In December 2014, a 33-year-old female tenant hanged herself in the toilet inside the house, making the house a death home, after which the unit became difficult to sell. It was put up for auction, with an initial reserve price of HK$33.8 million. The house was eventually sold for a 40% discount at HK$20 million.

== Well-known residents ==
- Chiang Chen
- Gordon Siu
- Ronny Tong
- Sam Hui
- Cecilia Cheung
- Jordan Chan
- Leo Ku
- Miriam Yeung
- Chapman To and his wife Kristal Tin
- Mary Jean Reimer

== Transportation ==
Hong Lok Yuen has a shuttle bus service (NR51) for residents that travels to Tai Wo station on the MTR East Rail line, Tai Po Town Centre and Tai Po Market.

The following buses also stop at Hong Lok Yuen bus stop located on the Tai Po Road - Tai Wo Section about 300 metres walk from the entrance to the estate: 64P, 64K, 65K, 73, 73A, 74C, 74D, N73.

The following red minibuses also stop on Tai Po Road - Tai Wo Section.

- Sheung Shui to Castle Peak route
- Sheung Shui to Jordan Road route (24 hours)
- Sheung Shui to Mong Kok route (on demand)
- Sheung Shui to Causeway Bay route (night service)
- Kwun Tong to Lok Ma Chau route

== District Council Seat ==
Because Hong Lok Yuen does not have sufficient population for a seat, it is in the same electorate as Sha Lo Tung, and other villages.

Year/Area	2000-2003	2004-2007	2008-2011	2012-2015	2016-2019	2020-2023
Hong Lok Yuen	P17 Hong Lok Yuen constituency					

Note: There are other minor adjustments (including numbering) in the above main areas. Please refer to the relevant district board election constituency boundary map and entries.

== See also ==
- Fairview Park (Hong Kong)
- Palm Springs (Hong Kong)
