= Yuen Tun Ha =

Coordinates: 22.429275°N 114.161736°E

Yuen Tun Ha (Chinese: 元墩下) is an area and a village in Tai Po District, Hong Kong. It is the ending point of Stage 7 and the starting point of Stage 8, of the Wilson Trail.

== Administration ==
Yuen Tun Ha is a recognized village under the New Territories Small House Policy. It is one of the villages represented within the Tai Po Rural Committee. For electoral purposes, Yuen Tun Ha is part of the Tai Po Kau constituency, which is currently represented by Patrick Mo Ka-chun.

== See also ==
- Tai Po River
