= San Uk Ka =

Village of Hong Kong

Coordinates: 22.433596°N 114.163402°E

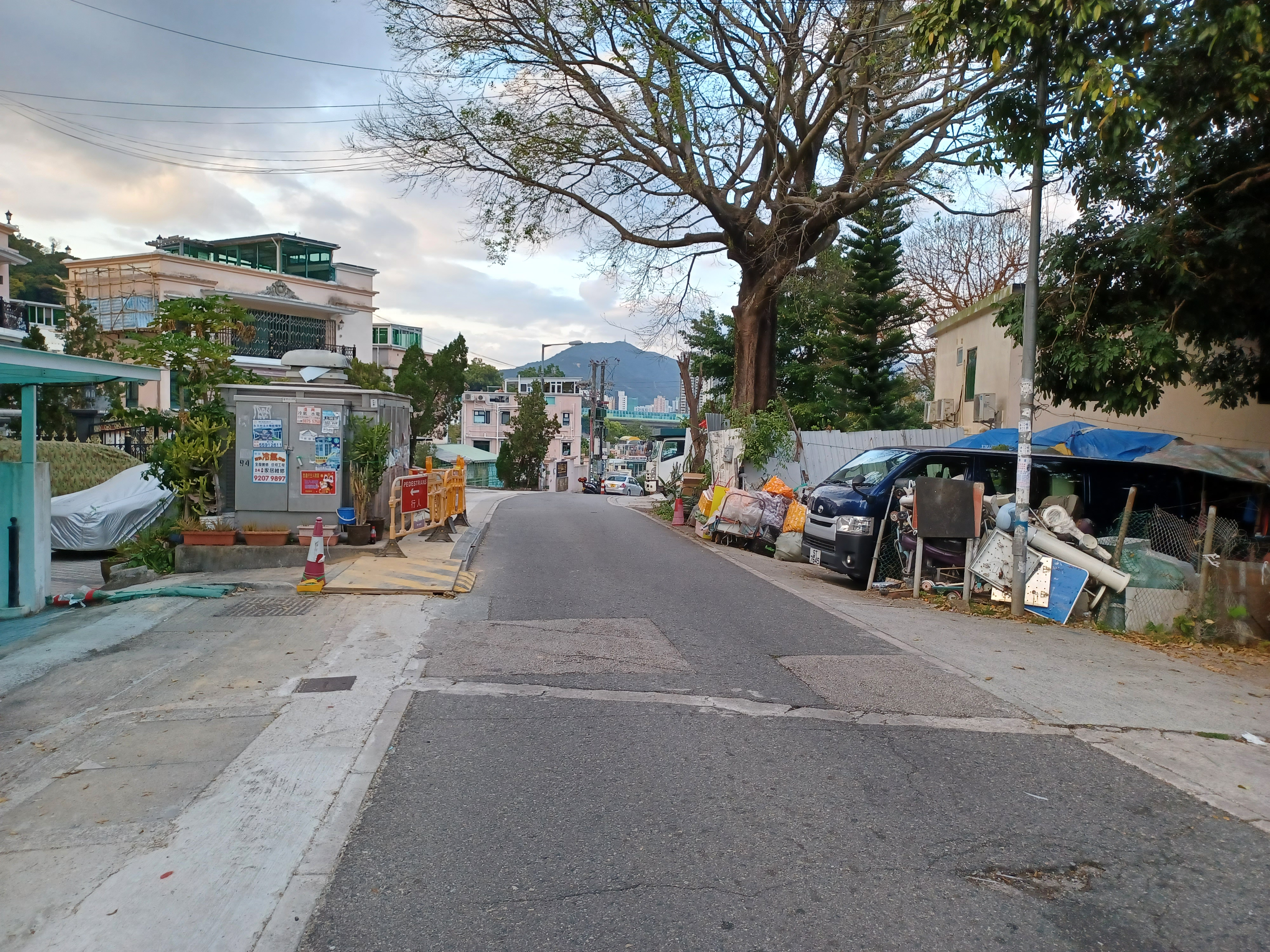
Wilson Trail Stage 8 along Wun Yiu Road at San Uk Ka.

San Uk Ka (Chinese: 新屋家) is a village in Tai Po District, Hong Kong.

== Administration ==
San Uk Ka is one of the villages represented within the Tai Po Rural Committee. For electoral purposes, San Uk Ka is part of the Tai Po Kau constituency, which is currently represented by Patrick Mo Ka-chun.

San Uk Ka is a recognized village under the New Territories Small House Policy.

== Access ==
San Uk Ka is crossed by the Wilson Trail Stage 8, along Wun Yiu Road (碗窰路).
