= Siu Ma Shan =

Hill in Hong Kong

- 小馬山
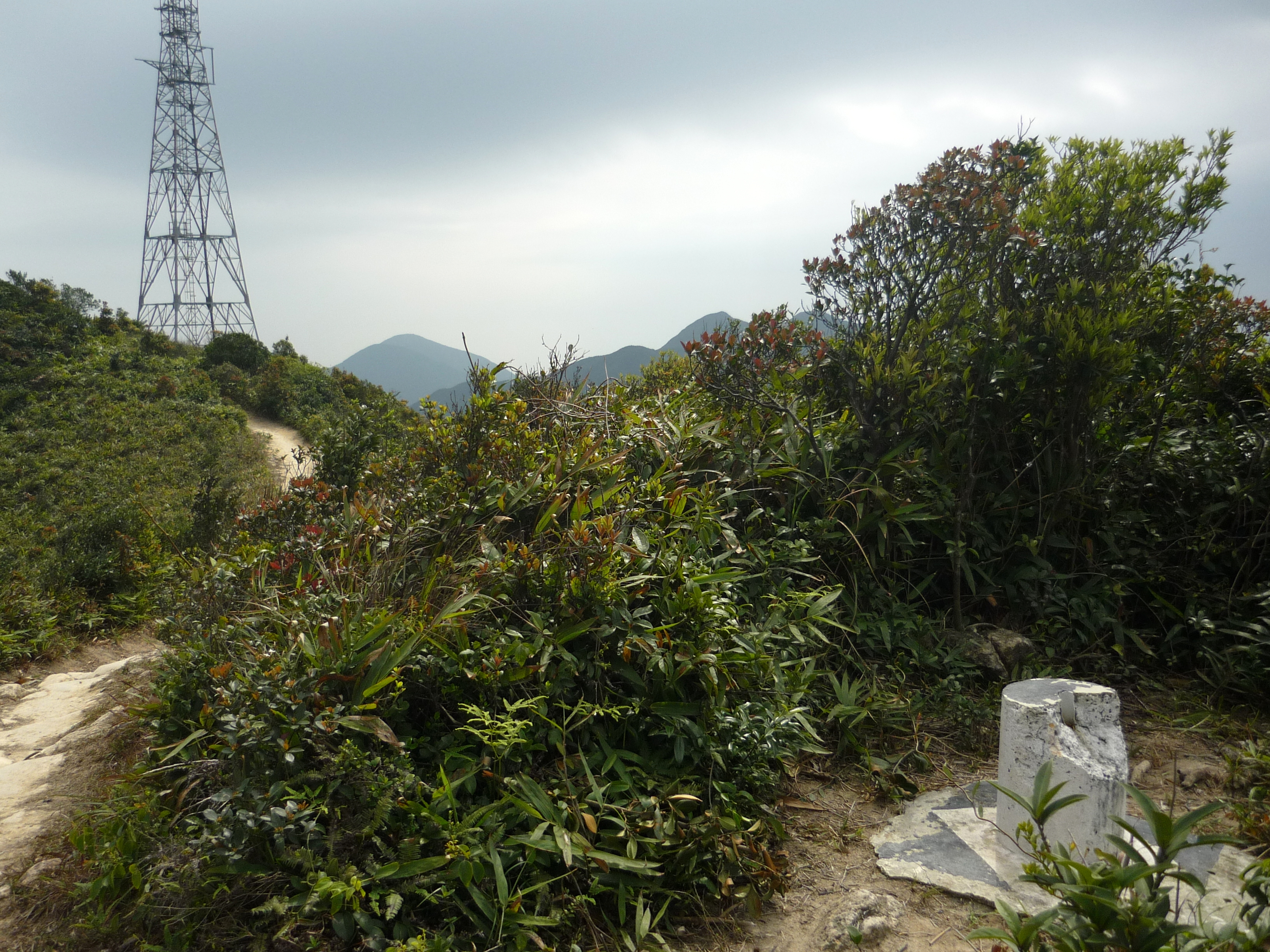
- View of Siu Ma Shan

Highest point
- Elevation: 424 m (1,391 ft)
- Coordinates: 22.2722°N 114.206611°E

Geography
- Location within Hong Kong
- Location: Hong Kong

Siu Ma Shan (Chinese: 小馬山) is a 424-metre (1,391 ft) high hill located within Tai Tam Country Park (Quarry Bay Extension) on Hong Kong Island, with Mount Parker to the east, Mount Butler to the south, Jardine's Lookout to the southwest, the Hong Kong Police Mount Butler Firing Range to the west and Braemar Hill to the northwest.

Walker Street signal station and Mount Butler high frequency radio receiving station are located on Siu Ma Shan, and there are several radio antenna masts on the northwest side of the hill.

Wilson Trail Stage 2 passes near the summit of Siu Ma Shan.

== Gallery ==
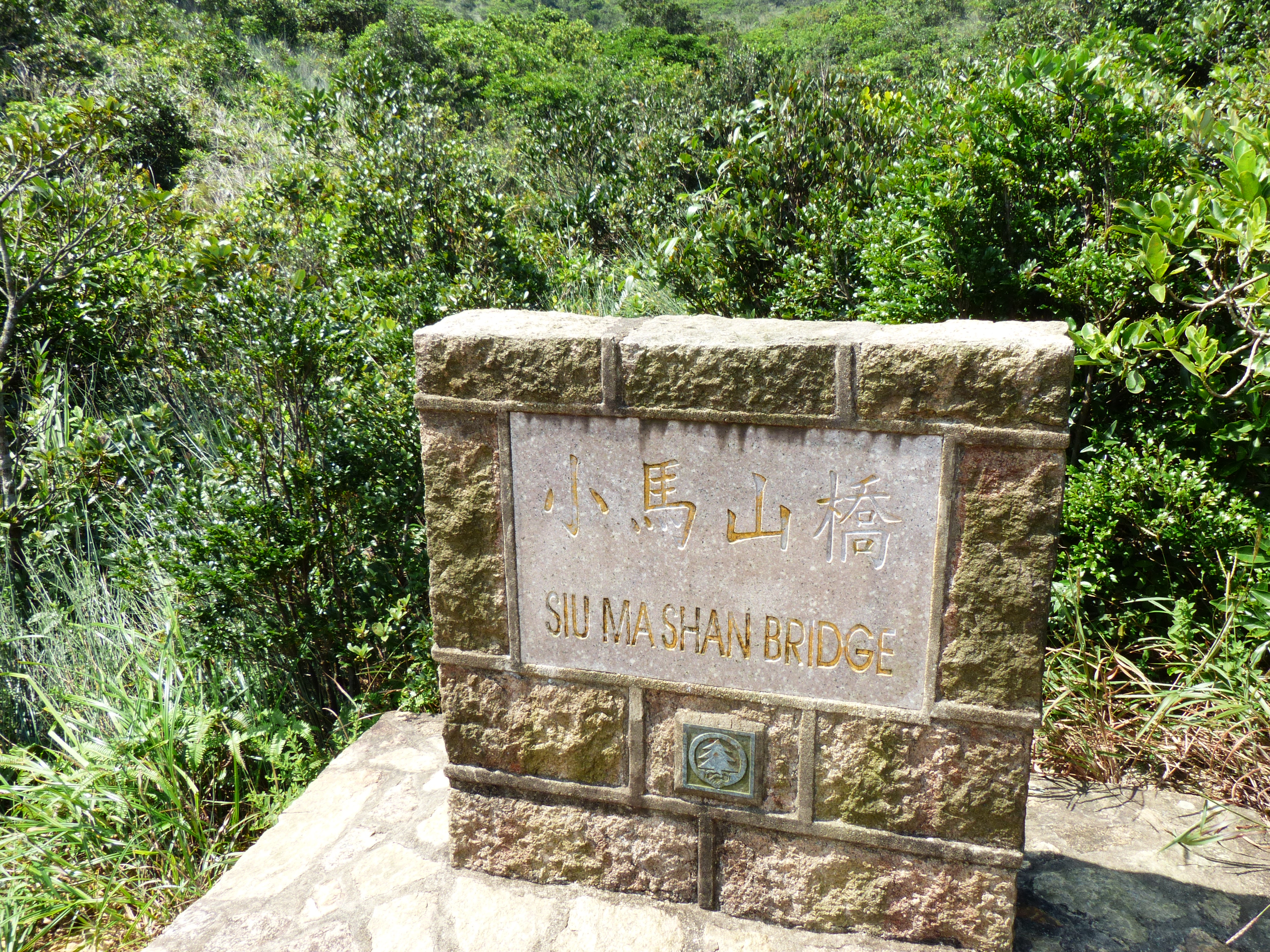
Siu Ma Shan Bridge

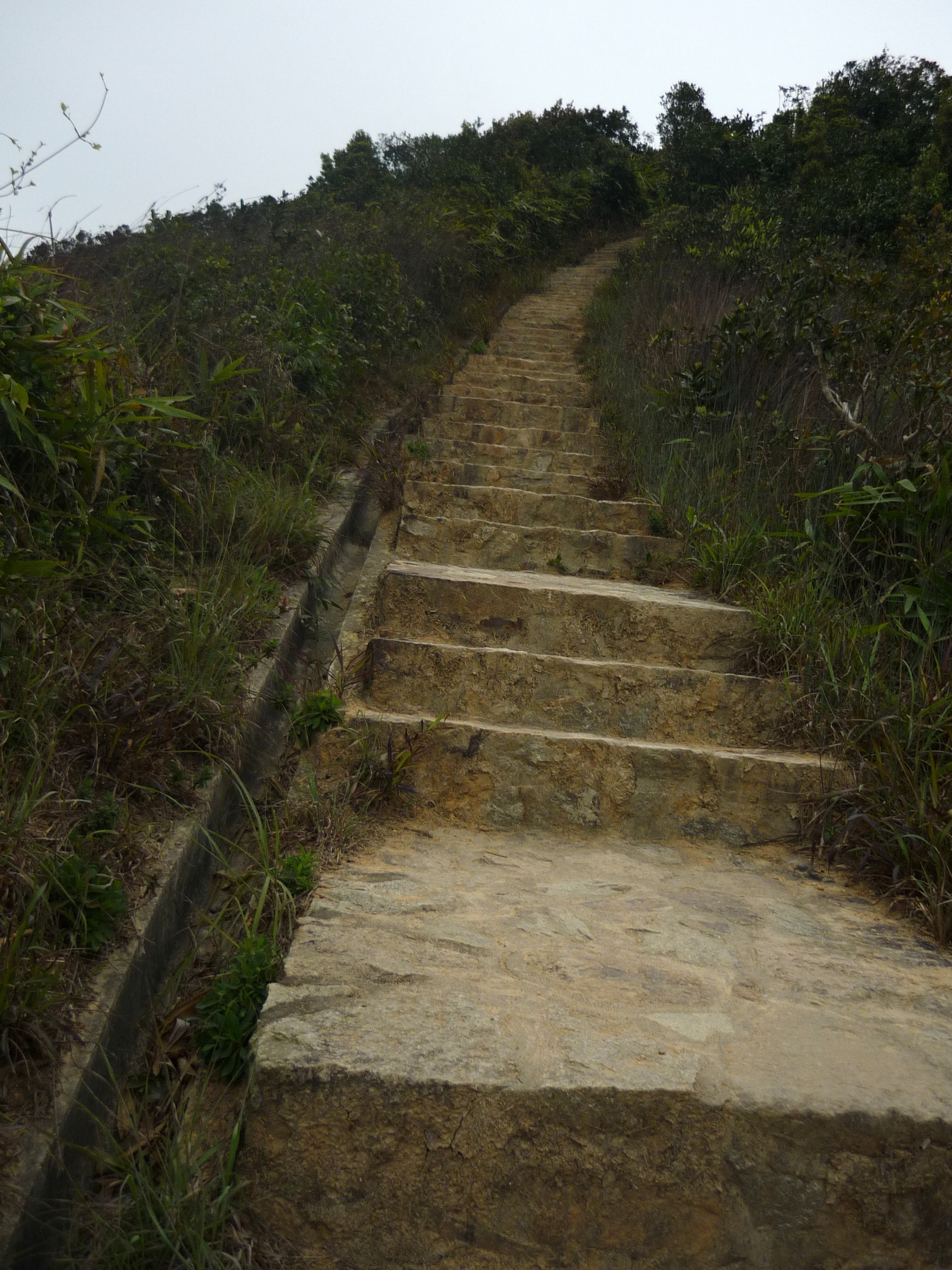
Stairs to Siu Ma Shan

== See also ==
- List of mountains, peaks and hills in Hong Kong
