= Hok Tau Reservoir =

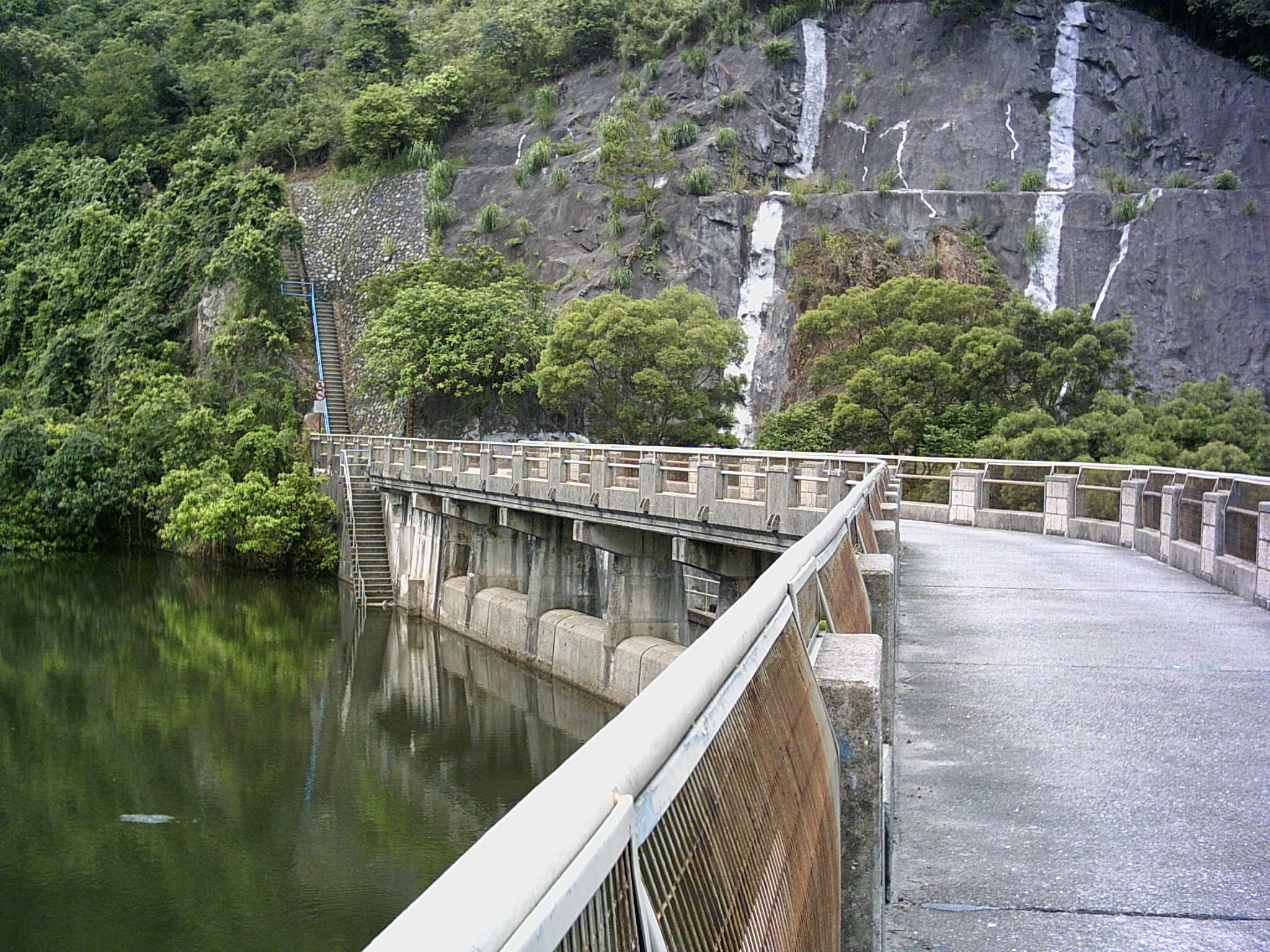
- Dam of Hok Tau Reservoir

- Location within Hong Kong
- Location: New Territories, Hong Kong
- Coordinates: 22.4914°N 114.1814°E
- Type: reservoir
- Primary inflows: Tan Shan River
- Primary outflows: Tan Shan River

Hok Tau Reservoir
- Traditional Chinese: 鶴藪水塘
Transcriptions
Yue: Cantonese
- Yale Romanization: Hohk sáu séui tòhng
- Jyutping: Hok6 sau2 soei1 tong4

Hok Tau Reservoir is a small S-shaped reservoir situated in the northeastern New Territories, Hong Kong. The Tan Shan River flows through the reservoir and eventually empties into the Ng Tung River. The reservoir can be accessed by Stage 9 of the Wilson Trail or by the Hok Tau Reservoir Family Walk.

It is within the borders of Pat Sin Leng Country Park and the family trail has many barbecue sites adjacent to the reservoir.
