= Cloudy Hill =

Mountain in Hong Kong

- 九龍坑山
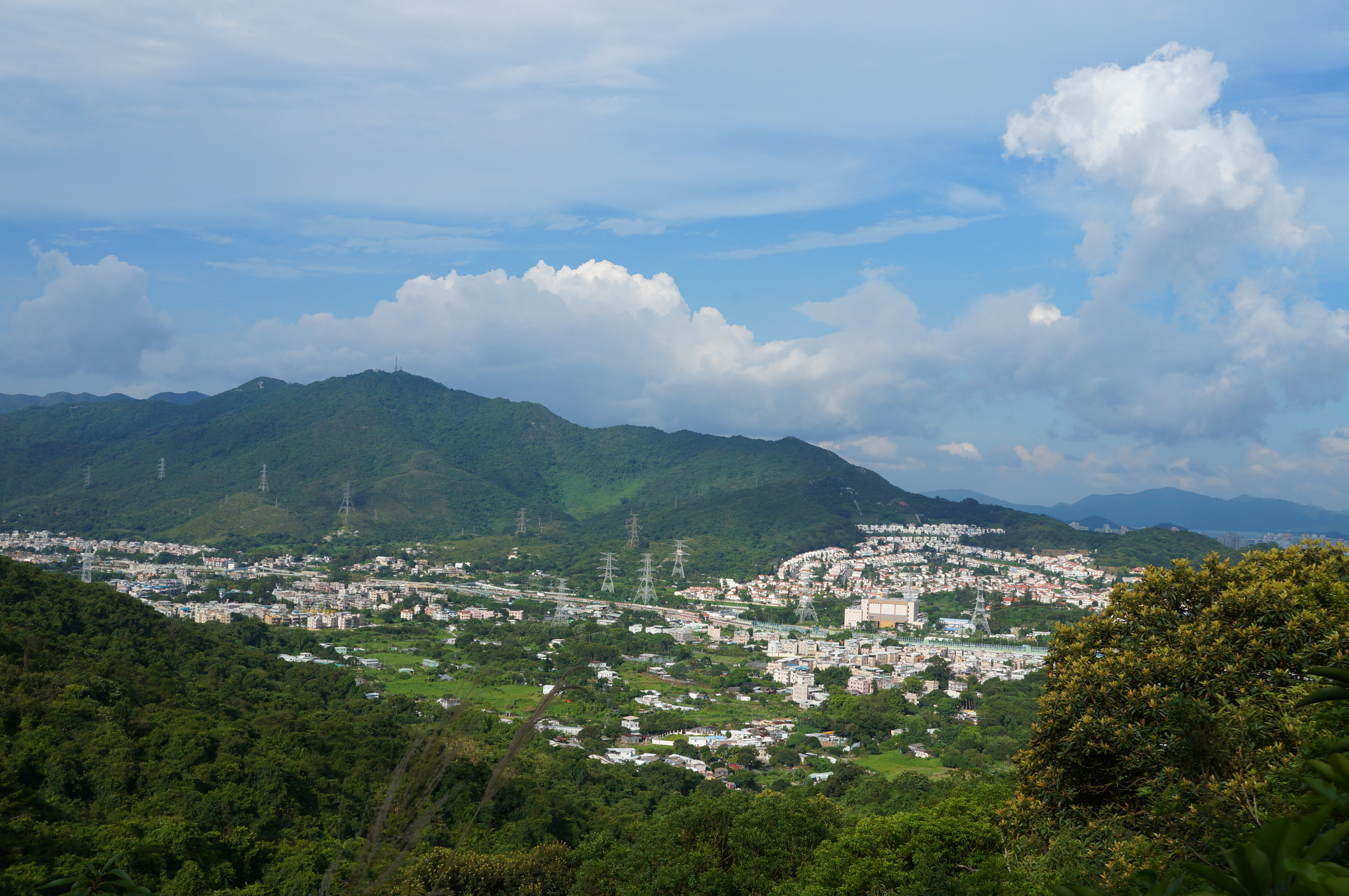
- View of Cloudy Hill and Hong Lok Yuen from Ngau Kwu Leng

Highest point
- Elevation: 440 m (1,440 ft)
- Coordinates: 22°28′33.21″N 114°10′13.87″E

Geography
- Location within Hong Kong
- Location: Hong Kong

Cloudy Hill or Kau Lung Hang Shan (Chinese: 九龍坑山) is a 440m high hill in Tai Po District of northeastern Hong Kong. It is located within Pat Sin Leng Country Park.

The source of the Ma Wat River is located on Cloudy Hill. Some parts of the hiking trail are very difficult to walk. Stage 9 of the Wilson Trail starts from the top of the hill.

== See also ==
- List of mountains, peaks and hills in Hong Kong
- Wilson Trail
- Tai Po
