= Pat Sin Leng =

Mountain range in Hong Kong

Coordinates: 22°29′N 114°13′E

- 八仙嶺
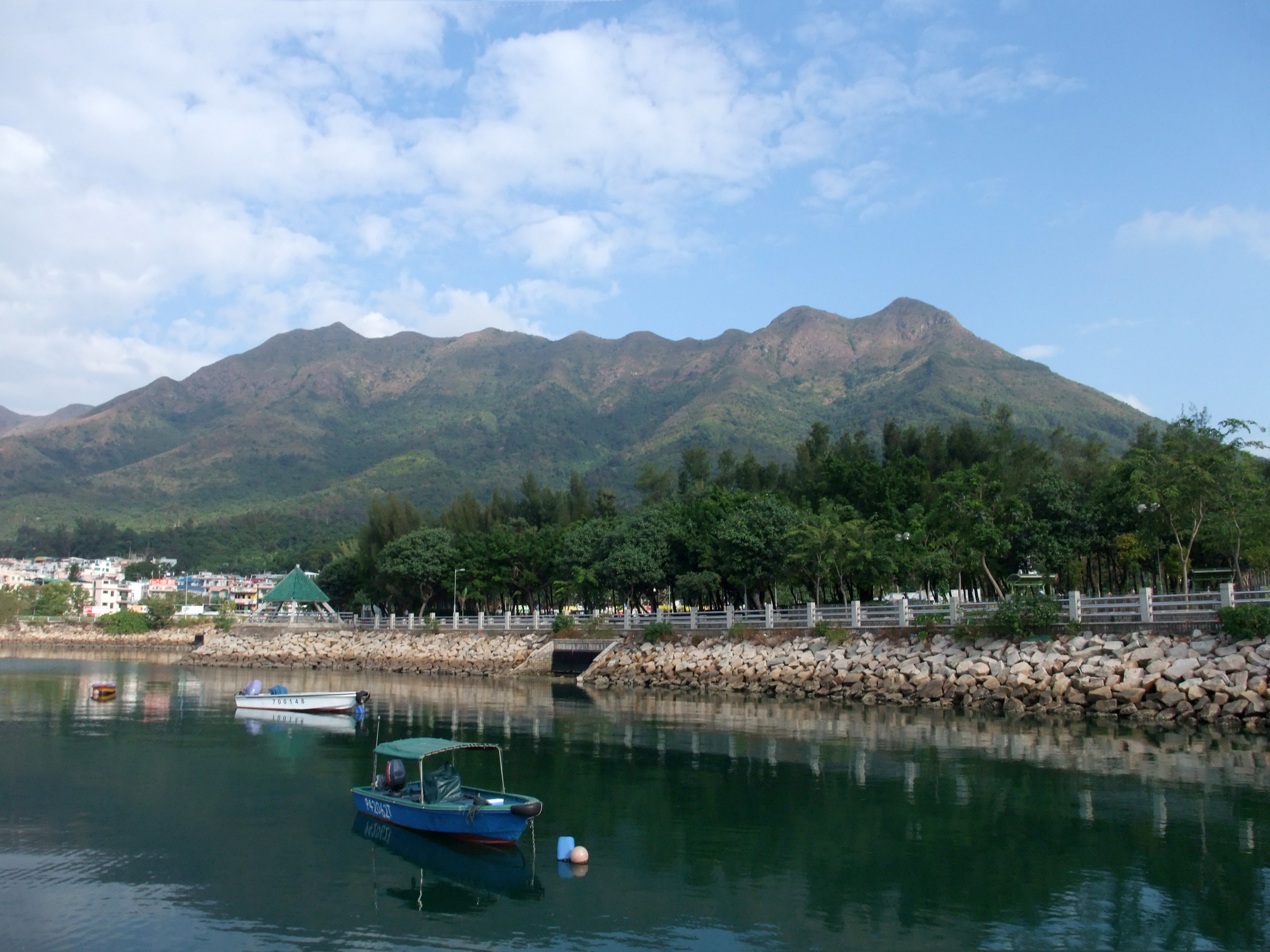
- View of Pat Sin Leng from Tai Mei Tuk

Highest point
- Elevation: 591 m (1,939 ft)

Geography
- Location within Hong Kong
- Location: Hong Kong

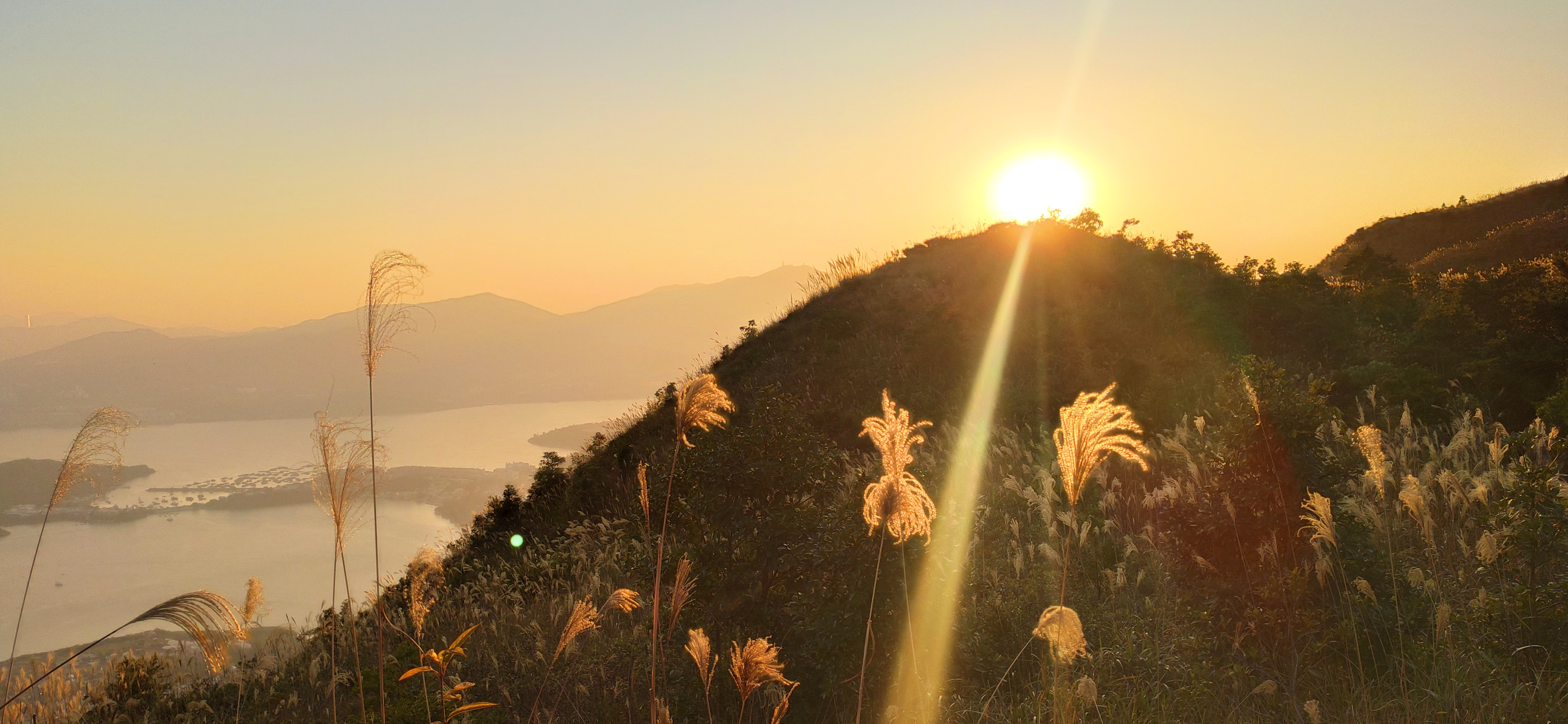
Pat Sin Leng sunset

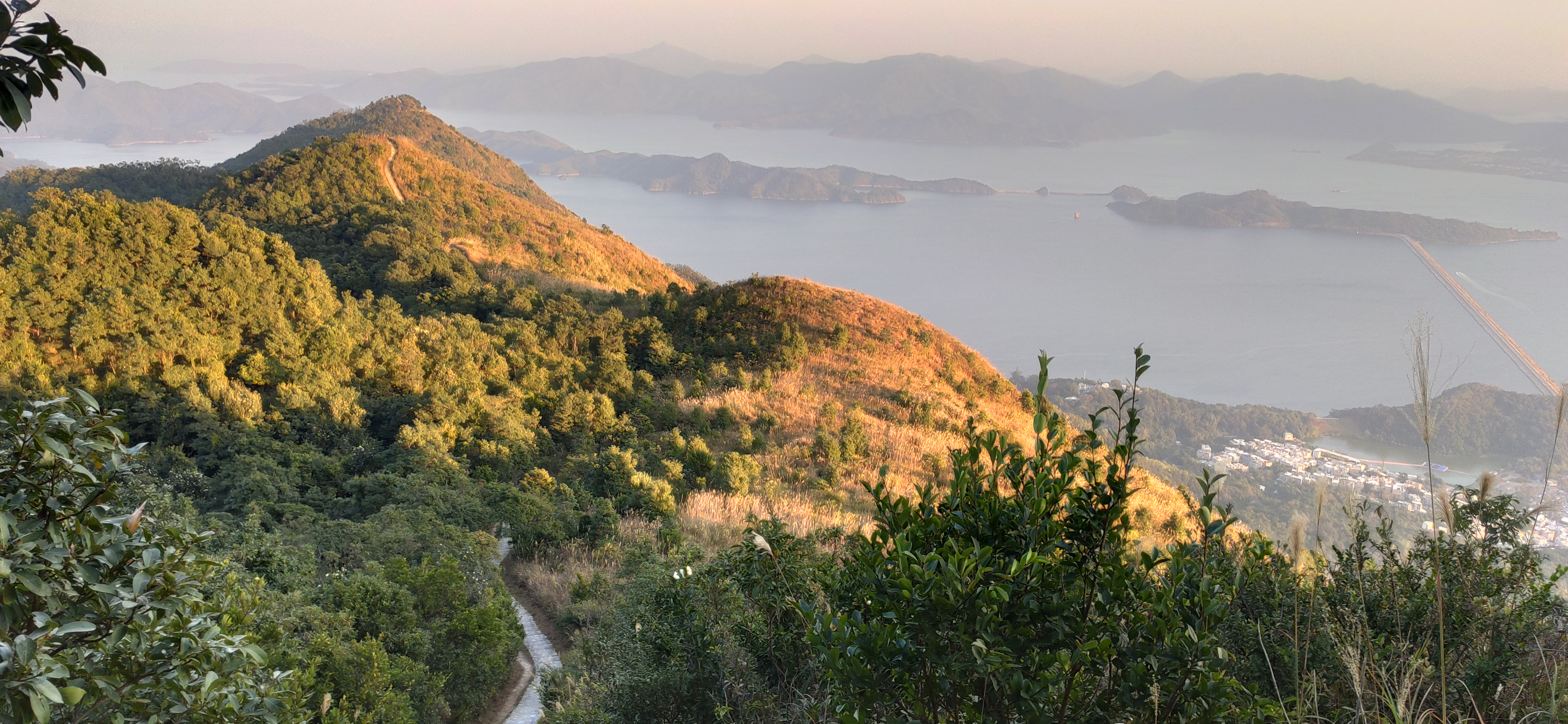
Pat Sin Leng Ridge

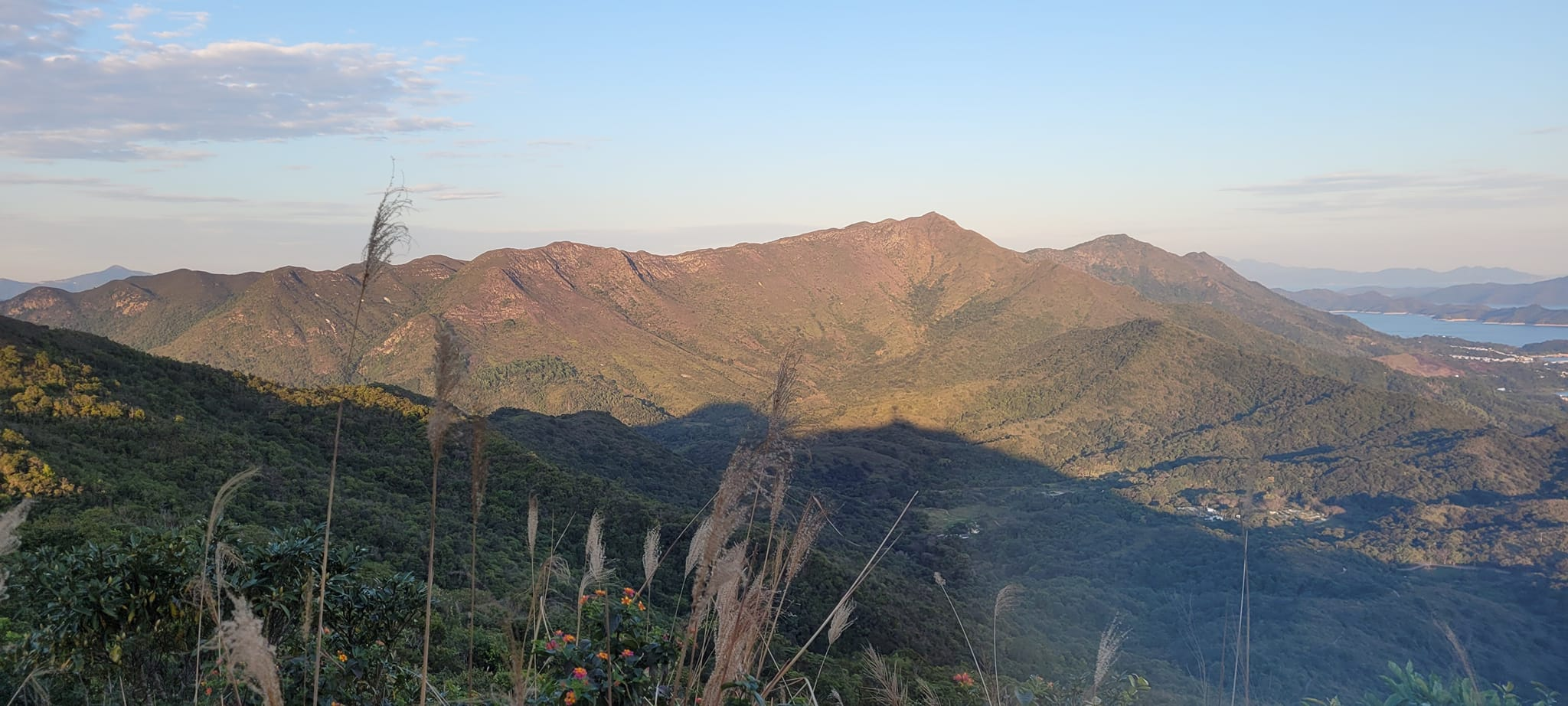
Pat Sin Leng from Cloudy Hill

Pat Sin Leng (Chinese: 八仙嶺) is a mountain range in the northeast New Territories of Hong Kong, located within the Pat Sin Leng Country Park. The name Pat Sin Leng literally means "Ridge of the Eight Immortals", who are eight well-known xian ("Immortals; Transcendents; Fairies") in Chinese mythology. The eight peaks along the Pat Sin Leng mountain range are each named after a different Immortal.

== Mountain peaks ==
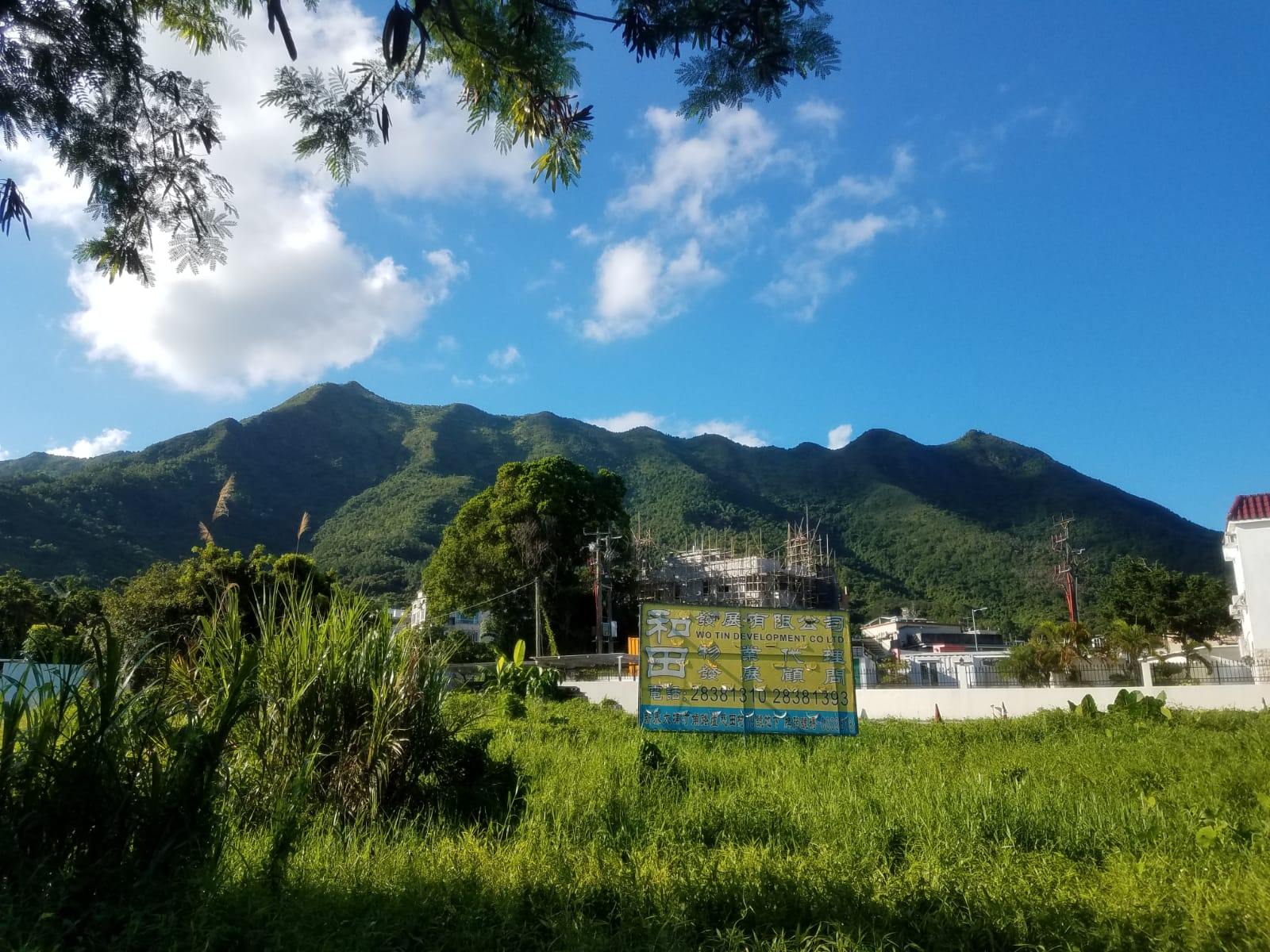
Pat Sin Leng from Ting Kok Road

There are eight peaks whose elevation range from 489m to 590m. From west to east, they are:

=== Shun Yeung Fung ===
Shun Yeung Fung (純陽峰) is the sixteenth highest peak in Hong Kong with an elevation of 590m, located in north Tai Po of New Territories. It is also the westernmost and highest peak of the Pat Sing Leng mountain range. The peak is named after the leader of Eight Immortals, Lü Dongbin (呂洞賓)'s secular name Chunyang Zi (純陽子).

=== Chung Li Fung ===
Chung Li Fung (鍾離峰) is a mountain peak, part of the Pat Sin Leng range with an elevation of 529m. The peak is named after one of the Eight Immortals, Zhongli Han (漢鍾離).

=== Kao Lao Fung ===
Kao Lao Fung (果老峰) is a mountain peak, part of the Pat Sin Leng range with an elevation of 543m. The peak is named after one of the Eight Immortals, Elder Zhang Guo (張果老).

=== Kuai Li Fung ===
Kuai Li Fung (拐李峰) is a mountain peak, part of the Pat Sin Leng range with an elevation of 522m. The peak is named after one of the Eight Immortals, Iron-Crutch Li (鐵拐李).

=== Tsao Kau Fung ===
Tsao Kau Fung (曹舅峰) is a mountain peak, part of the Pat Sin Leng range with an elevation of 508m. The peak is named after one of the Eight Immortals, Royal Uncle Cao (曹國舅).

=== Choi Wo Fung ===
Choi Wo Fung (采和峰) is a mountain peak, part of the Pat Sin Leng range with an elevation of 489m. The peak is named after one of the Eight Immortals, Lan Caihe (藍采和).

=== Sheung Tsz Fung ===
Sheung Tsz Fung (湘子峰) is a mountain peak, part of the Pat Sin Leng range with an elevation of 513m. The peak is named after one of the Eight Immortals, Han Xiang (韓湘子).

=== Hsien Ku Fung ===
Hsien Ku Fung (仙姑峰) is a mountain peak, part of the Pat Sin Leng range with an elevation of 511m. This is the easternmost peak of the range. The peak is named after one of the Eight Immortals, Immortal Woman He (何仙姑).

== 1996 hillfire ==
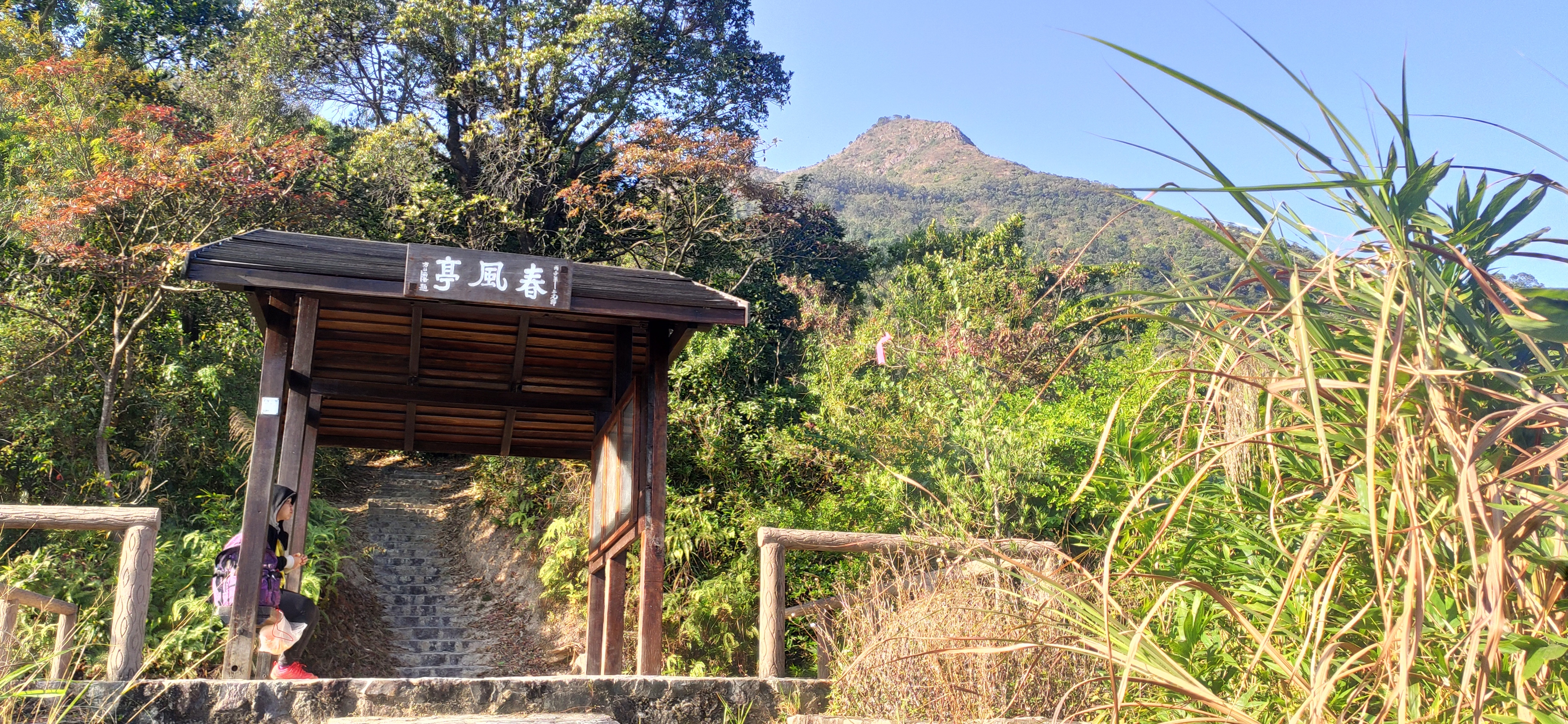
The Spring Breeze Pavilion

A hill fire broke out on Pat Sin Leng on 10 February 1996, when a group of 49 teachers and students from HKCWC Fung Yiu King Memorial Secondary School were hiking in the mountains. 200 firemen and four helicopters were sent to rescue the group. Two teachers, Chau Chi Chai (周志齊) and Wong Sau Mei (王秀媚), and three students died, with 13 others injured.

Spring Breeze Pavilion (春風亭) was built on the mountain in memory of the five who died. It was inaugurated by the then-Governor of Hong Kong, Chris Patten, on 12 March 1996.

== See also ==
- List of mountains, peaks and hills in Hong Kong
- Wong Leng
- Tai Mei Tuk
