= Hong Lok Yuen (constituency) =

Hong Kong constituency

- Elected constituency for the Tai Po District Council
- Boundary of Hong Lok Yuen in Tai Po District
- District: Tai Po
- Legislative Council constituency: New Territories North East
- Population: 20,488 (2019)
- Electorate: 8,181 (2019)

Current constituency
- Created: 1999
- Number of members: One
- Member: Vacant

Hong Lok Yuen is one of the 19 constituencies in the Tai Po District.

The constituency returns one district councillor to the Tai Po District Council, with an election every four years. The seat was currently held by nonpartisan Zero Yiu Yeuk-sang.

Hong Lok Yuen constituency is loosely based on Hong Lok Yuen, Cloudy Hill (Kau Lung Hang Shan), Sha Lo Tung and Tai Po Industrial Estate in the northern part of Tai Po District with estimated population of 15,866.

== Councillors represented ==
Election	Member	Party
1999	Man Chen-fai	Nonpartisan
2007 by-election	Tang Yau-fat	Nonpartisan
2015	Patrick Tang Ming-tai	Nonpartisan
2019	Zero Yiu Yeuk-sang→Vacant (Note: Resigned on 16 May 2021 over new oath-taking law.)	Nonpartisan

== Election results ==
=== 2010s ===
Tai Po District Council Election, 2019: Hong Lok Yuen
Party	Candidate	Votes	%	±%
Nonpartisan	Zero Yiu Yeuk-sang	3,302	57.72	
Nonpartisan	Patrick Tang Ming-tai	2,419	42.28	−18.85
Majority		883	15.44	
Turnout		5,741	70.20	
Nonpartisan gain from Nonpartisan		Swing		

Tai Po District Council Election, 2015: Hong Lok Yuen
Party	Candidate	Votes	%	±%
Nonpartisan	Patrick Tang Ming-tai	1,780	61.13	
BPA	Man Chen-fai	1,132	38.87	
Majority		648	22.26	
Turnout		2,912	38.03	
Nonpartisan gain from Nonpartisan		Swing		

Tai Po District Council Election, 2011: Hong Lok Yuen
Party	Candidate	Votes	%	±%
Nonpartisan	Tang Yau-fat	Uncontested		
Nonpartisan hold		Swing		

=== 2000s ===
Tai Po District Council Election, 2007: Hong Lok Yuen
Party	Candidate	Votes	%	±%
Nonpartisan	Tang Yau-fat	Uncontested		
Nonpartisan hold		Swing		

Hong Lok Yuen by-election 2007
Party	Candidate	Votes	%	±%
Nonpartisan	Tang Yau-fat	1,046	73.66	
Nonpartisan	Ho Kwok-keung	374	26.34	
Majority		672	47.32	
Nonpartisan gain from Nonpartisan		Swing		

Tai Po District Council Election, 2003: Hong Lok Yuen
Party	Candidate	Votes	%	±%
Nonpartisan	Man Chen-fai	1,171	70.29	+2.32
Independent	Ip Wai-choi	495	29.72	
Majority		676	40.57	
Nonpartisan hold		Swing	+24.55	

=== 1990s ===
Tai Po District Council Election, 1999: Hong Lok Yuen
Party	Candidate	Votes	%	±%
Nonpartisan	Man Chen-fai	908	67.81	
Liberal	Kwok Chun-chi	431	32.19	
Majority		477	35.62	
Nonpartisan win (new seat)				
