= List of villages in Hong Kong =

The following is a list of villages in Hong Kong.

== Villages in the New Territories ==
Non-indigenous villages are italicised. Composite villages are bolded.

Each village has one resident representative and at least one indigenous inhabitant representative. Villages with more than one indigenous inhabitant representatives are marked.

=== North District ===
==== Fanling District Rural Committee ====
粉嶺區鄉事委員會

- Fan Leng Lau (粉嶺樓) **(2)**
- Fanling Wai (粉嶺圍)
  - Fanling Ching Wai (粉嶺正圍)
  - Fanling Pak Wai (粉嶺北圍)
  - Fanling Nam Wai (粉嶺南圍)
- Hok Tau Wai (鶴藪圍)
- Ling Shan Tsuen (靈山村)
- Lo Wai (老圍)
- Ma Wat Wai (馬笏圍)
  - Ma Wat Tsuen (馬笏村)
- Pak Fuk Tsuen (百福村)
- Shung Him Tong Tsuen (崇謙堂村)
- Tin Sam Tsuen (田心村)
- Tong Hang (塘坑)
  - Tong Hang Village (塘坑村)
- Tsz Tong Tsuen (祠堂村)
- Tung Kok Wai (東閣圍)
- Wing Ning Wai (永寧圍)
  - Wing Ning Village (永寧村)
- Wo Hop Shek San Tsuen (和合石新村)
- Wo Hing Tsuen (和興村)

==== Sha Tau Kok District Rural Committee ====
沙頭角區鄉事委員會

- A Ma Wat (亞媽笏)
- Ap Chau (鴨洲)
- Au Ha (凹下)
- Fung Hang (鳳坑)
- Ha Wo Hang (下禾坑)
- Kai Kuk Shue Ha and Ham Hang Mei (雞谷樹下及鹹坑尾)
- Kap Tong (蛤塘)
- Kat O (吉澳)
- Kau Tam Tso (九担租)
- Kong Ha (崗下)
- Kuk Po (谷埔) **(2)**
- Lai Chi Wo (荔枝窩)
- Lai Tau Shek (犂頭石)
- Lin Ma Hang (蓮麻坑)
- Loi Tung (萊洞)
- Luk Keng Chan Uk (鹿頸陳屋)
- Luk Keng Wong Uk (鹿頸黃屋)
- Ma Tseuk Leng Ha (麻雀嶺下)
- Ma Tseuk Leng Sheung (麻雀嶺上)
- Man Uk Pin (萬屋邊)
- Miu Tin (苗田)
- Mui Tsz Lam (梅子林)
- Muk Min Tau and Tsiu Hang (木棉頭及蕉坑)
- Nam Chung (南涌)
- Ngau Shi Wu (牛屎湖)
- Sai Lau Kong (西流江)
- Sam A (三椏)
- San Tsuen (新村)
- Sha Tau Kok Market (East) (沙頭角墟(東))
- Sha Tau Kok Market (West Lower) (沙頭角墟(西下))
- Sha Tau Kok Market (West Upper) (沙頭角墟(西上))
- Shan Tsui (山嘴)
- Shek Chung Au (石涌凹)
- Shek Kiu Tau (石橋頭)
- Sheung Wo Hang (上禾坑)
- So Lo Pun (鎖羅盆)
- Tai Long (大朗)
- Tai Tong Wu (大塘湖)
- Tam Shui Hang (担水坑)
- Tong To (塘肚)
- Tsat Muk Kiu (七木橋)
- Wang Shan Keuk (橫山脚)
- Wu Kau Tang (鳥蛟騰)
- Wu Shek Kok (鳥石角)
- Yim Tso Ha and Pok Tau Ha (鹽杜下及膊頭下)
- Yung Shue Au (榕樹凹)

==== Sheung Shui District Rural Committee ====
上水區鄉事委員會

- Cheung Lek (長瀝)
- Hang Tau (坑頭) **(2)**
- Ho Sheung Heung (河上鄉)
- Kai Leung (雞嶺)
- Kam Tsin (金錢) **(2)**
- Kwu Tung (North) (古洞(北))
- Kwu Tung (South) (古洞(南))
- Lin Tong Mei (蓮塘尾)
- Liu Pok (料壆)
- Ma Tso Lung (North) (馬草壠(北))
- Ma Tso Lung (South) (馬草壠(南))
- Ng Uk Tsuen (吳屋村)
- Ping Kong (丙崗)
- Sheung Shui Heung (上水鄉) **(3)**
- Tai Tau Leng (大頭嶺) **(2)**
- Tong Kung Leng (唐公嶺)
- Tsiu Keng (蕉徑)
- Tsung Pak Long (松柏朗)
- Wa Shan Tsuen (華山村)
- Yin Kong (燕崗)
- Ying Pun (營盤)

==== Ta Kwu Ling District Rural Committee ====
打鼓嶺區鄉事委員會

- Chow Tin Tsuen (週田村) **(2)**
- Chuk Yuen (竹園)
- Fung Wong Wu (鳳凰湖)
- Ha Shan Kai Wat (下山雞乙)
- Heung Yuen Wai (香園圍)
- Kan Tau Wai (簡頭圍)
- Lei Uk (李屋)
- Lo Wu (羅湖)
- Muk Wu (木湖)
- Nga Yiu (瓦窰)
- Nga Yiu Ha (瓦窰下)
- Ping Che (坪輋)
- Ping Yeung (坪洋) **(4)**
- San Uk Ling (新屋嶺)
- Sheung Shan Kai Wut (上山雞乙)
- Tai Po Tin (大埔田)
- Tak Yuet Lau (得月樓)
- Tong Fong (塘坊)
- Tsung Yuen Ha (松園下)
- Wo Keng Shan (禾徑山)

==== Villages within the Frontier Closed Area ====
The following villages are located in Frontier Closed Area and can only be visited with a Closed Area Permit:

- Lo Wu (羅湖)(including Yuen Leng Chai (圓嶺仔))
- Sha Tau Kok Market (East) (沙頭角墟(東))
- Sha Tau Kok Market (West Lower) (沙頭角墟(西下))
- Sha Tau Kok Market (West Upper) (沙頭角墟(西上)
- San Kwai Tin / King To (新桂田/逕肚)
- Lin Ma Hang (蓮麻坑)(if visiting via Lin Ma Hang Road)
- Parts of Shan Tsui (山嘴)
- Kong Ha (崗下)
- Yuen Tun Shan (圓墩山)
- Choi Yuen Kok (菜園角)

Visiting the following villages through Starling Inlet requires a Closed Area Permit:

- Fung Hang (鳳坑)
- Kuk Po (谷埔)

Visiting the following villages through Sha Tau Kok Pier requires a Closed Area Permit:

- Ap Chau (鴨洲)
- Kap Tong (蛤塘)
- Kat O (吉澳)
- Lai Chi Wo (茘枝窩)
- Lei Pik Shek (犁頭石)
- Mui Tsz Lam (梅子林)
- Ngau Shi Wu (牛屎湖)
- Sam A (三椏)
- Sai Lau Kong (西流江)
- So Lo Pun (鎖羅盤)
- Yung Shue Au (榕樹凹)

=== Tai Po District ===
==== Sai Kung North Rural Committee ====
西貢北約鄉事委員會

- Che Ha (輋下)
- Chek Keng
- Cheung Muk Tau (樟木頭)
- Cheung Sheung
- Ha Yeung
- Hoi Ha
- Kei Ling Ha Lo Wai (企嶺下老圍)
- Kei Ling Ha San Wai (企嶺下新圍)
- Ko Lau Wan
- Ko Tong
- Kwun Hang (官坑)
- Lai Chi Chong
- Ma Kwu Lam (馬牯纜)
- Nai Chung (泥涌)
- Nam Shan Tung
- Nga Iu Tau Tsun (瓦窰頭)
- Ngong Ping
- Pak Sha O
- Pak Tam Au
- Ping Chau Chau Mei
- Ping Chau Chau Tau
- Ping Chau Nai Tau
- Ping Chau Sha Tau
- Ping Chau Tai Tong
- Sai Keng (西徑)
- Sai O (西澳)
- Sham Chung
- Tai Tan
- Tai Tung (大洞)
- Tan Ka Wan
- Tap Mun
- Tap Mun Fishermen Village
- Tin Liu (田寮)
- To Kwa Peng
- Tseng Tau (井頭)
- Tung Sam Kei
- Uk Tau
- Wong Chuk Yeung
- Yung Shu O

==== Tai Po Rural Committee ====
[大埔鄉事委員會]

- A Shan (鴉山)
- Chai Kek (寨乪)
- Cheung Shue Tan (樟樹灘)
- Cheung Uk Tei (張屋地)
- Chung Mei San Tsuen (涌尾新村)
- Chung Pui San Tsuen (涌背新村)
- Chung Uk Tsuen (鍾屋村)
- Fong Ma Po (放馬莆)
- Fung Yuen (鳳園)
- Ha Hang (下坑)
- Ha Tei Ha (蝦地下)
- Ha Wong Yi Au (下黃宜坳)
- Ha Wun Yiu (下碗窰)
- Hang Ha Po (坑下莆)
- Kam Chuk Pai San Tsuen (金竹排新村)
- Kam Shan Village (錦山村)
- Kau Liu Ha (較寮下)
- Kau Lung Hang (九龍坑)
- Lai Chi Shan (荔枝山)
- Lin Au, Cheng Uk
- Lin Au, Lei Uk
- Lo Tsz Tin
- Luen Yick Fishermen Village
- Lung A Pei
- Lung Mei (龍尾)
- Ma Po Mei
- Ma Wo Tsuen
- Mui Shue Hang
- Nam Hang
- Nam Wa Po (南華莆)
- Ng Tung Chai
- Pak Ngau Shek Ha Tsuen
- Pak Ngau Shek Sheung Tsuen
- Pan Chung
- Pan Chung San Tsuen
- Ping Long
- Ping Shan Chai
- Po Sam Pai
- Pun Shan Chau
- Sam Mun Tsai
- San Tau Kok
- San Tong
- San Tsuen (Lam Tsuen)
- San Uk Ka
- San Uk Tsai
- San Wai Tsai
- Sha Lo Tung Cheung Uk
- Sha Lo Tung Lei Uk
- Shan Liu
- She Shan
- Shek Kwu Lung
- Sheung Wong Yi Au
- Sheung Wun Yiu
- Shuen Wan Chan Uk
- Shuen Wan Chim Uk
- Shuen Wan Lei Uk
- Shuen Wan Sha Lan
- Shuen Wan Wai Ha
- Shui Wo
- Siu Kau San Tsuen
- Siu Om Shan
- Ta Tit Yan
- Tai Hang
- Tai Kau San Tsuen
- Tai Mei Tuk (大尾督／大美督)
- Tai Mon Che
- Tai Om
- Tai Om Shan
- Tai Po Kau
- Tai Po Kau Hui
- Tai Po Mei (大埔尾)
- Tai Po Tau (大埔頭)
- Tai Po Tau Shui Wai (大埔頭水圍)
- Tai Wo (大窩)
- Tin Liu Ha
- Ting Kok (汀角)
- To Yuen Tung
- Tong Sheung Tsuen
- Tseng Tau
- Tung Tsz
- Wai Tau Tsuen
- Wan Tau Kok
- Wang Ling Tau San Tsuen
- Wong Yue Tan
- Yin Ngam
- Ying Pun Ha Chuk Hang
- Yue Kok (魚角)
- Yuen Leng Lei Uk
- Yuen Leng Yip Uk
- Yuen Tun Ha

=== Sha Tin District ===
==== Sha Tin Rural Committee ====
沙田鄉事委員會. About 29,000 people live in 48 indigenous villages.

- Ah Kung Kok Fishermen Village (亞公角漁民村)
- Au Pui Wan (坳背灣)
- Chap Wai Kon (插桅杆)
- Chek Nai Ping (赤坭坪)
- Cheung Lek Mei (長瀝尾)
- Fo Tan (火炭)
- Fu Yung Pei (芙蓉泌)
- Fui Yiu Ha (灰窰下) and Tse Uk (謝屋)
- Ha Keng Hau (下徑口)
- Ha Wo Che (下禾輋)
- Hin Tin (顯田)
- Ho Lek Pui (河瀝背)
- Kak Tin (隔田)
- Kau To (九肚)
- Kwun Yam Shan (觀音山) and Kong Pui (崗背)
- Lok Lo Ha (落路下)
- Ma Liu (馬料)
- Ma On Shan (馬鞍山)
- Mau Tat (茅笪)
- Mau Tso Ngam (茂草岩)
- Mui Tsz Lam (梅子林)
- Ngau Pei Sha (牛皮沙)
- Pai Tau Village (排頭村)
- Pat Tsz Wo (拔子窩)
- San Tin Village (新田村)
- Sha Tin Tau (沙田頭) and Lee Uk (李屋)
- Sha Tin Wai (沙田圍)
- Shan Ha Wai (山下圍) aka. Tsang Tai Uk (曾大屋)
- Shan Mei (山尾)
- Shap Yi Wat (十二笏)
- Shek Kwu Lung (石古壟) and Nam Shan (南山)
- Shek Lung Tsai (石壟仔)
- Sheung Keng Hau (上徑口)
- Sheung Wo Che (上禾輋)
- Siu Lek Yuen (小瀝源)
- Tai Lam Liu (大南寮)
- Tai Shui Hang Village (大水坑村)
- Tai Wai Village (大圍村)
- Tin Sum (田心)
- To Shek (多石)
- To Tau Wan (渡頭灣)
- Tsok Pok Hang (作壆坑)
- Tung Lo Wan (銅鑼灣)
- Wo Liu Hang (禾寮坑)
- Wong Chuk Yeung (黃竹洋)
- Wong Nai Tau Village (黃泥頭村), Tai Che (大輋) and Fa Sham Hang (花心坑)
- Wong Uk (王屋)
- Wu Kai Sha Village (烏溪沙村) and Cheung Kang (長徑)

=== Sai Kung District ===
==== Hang Hau Rural Committee ====
坑口鄉事委員會

- Fu Tau Chau (斧頭洲)
- Po Toi O (布袋澳)
- Shui Bin Tsuen (水邊村)

==== Sai Kung Rural Committee ====
西貢鄉事委員會

- Che Keng Tuk (輋徑篤)
- Hing Keng Shek
- Ho Chung
- Hoi Pong Street
- Kai Ham
- Kau Sai San Tsuen
- Long Keng
- Lung Mei
- Ma Nam Wat
- Main Street (East)
- Main Street (West)
- Man Wo
- Man Yee Wan New Village
- Mau Ping New Village
- Mok Tse Che
- Nam A
- Nam Shan
- Nam Wai
- Ngong Wo
- O Long
- O Tau
- Pak A
- Pak Kong
- Pak Kong Au
- Pak Lap
- Pak Sha Wan
- Pak Tam
- Pak Tam Chung
- Pak Wai
- Pik Uk
- Ping Tun
- Po Tung Road (East)
- Po Tung Road (West)
- Sai Kung Road (North)
- Sai Kung Road (South)
- Sai Wan
- See Cheung Street
- Sha Ha
- Sha Kok Mei
- Sha Tsui New Village
- Shan Liu
- She Tau
- Shek Hang
- Ta Ho Tun
- Tai Lam Wu
- Tai Long
- Tai Mong Tsai
- Tai No
- Tai Po Tsai
- Tai She Wan
- Tai Street (East)
- Tai Street (West)
- Tai Wan
- Tak Lung Back Street
- Tak Lung Front Street
- Tam Wat
- Tit Kim Hang
- Tsak Yue Wu
- Tsam Chuk Wan
- Tsiu Hang
- Tso Wo Hang
- Tui Min Hoi
- Tung A
- Uk Cheung
- Wo Liu
- Wo Mei
- Wong Chuk Shan New Village
- Wong Chuk Wan
- Wong Keng Tei
- Wong Keng Tsai
- Wong Mo Ying
- Wong Yi Chau
- Yim Tin Tsai

=== Yuen Long District ===
==== Lau Fau Shan Rural Committee ====
流浮山鄉事委員會

- Fung Ka Wai
- Hang Hau Tsuen
- Mong Tseng Tsuen
- Mong Tseng Wai
- Nam Sha Po
- Ngau Hom
- Pak Nai
- San Hing Tsuen
- Sha Kong Tsuen
- Sha Kong Wai
- Tai Shui Hang
- Tin Shui Wai

==== Ha Tsuen Rural Committee ====
廈村鄉事委員會

- Fung Kong Tsuen
- Ha Tsuen San Wai
- Ha Tsuen Shi (廈村市)
- Hong Mei Tsuen
- Lei Uk Tsuen
- Lo Uk Tsuen
- San Lei Uk Tsuen
- San Sang Tsuen
- San Uk Tsuen
- Sik Kong Tsuen
- Sik Kong Wai
- Tin Sam Tsuen
- Tseung Kong Wai
- Tung Tau Tsuen
- Sha Chau Lei Tsuen
- **Ha Pak Nai Tsuen** (下白泥村)

==== Kam Tin Rural Committee ====
錦田鄉事委員會

- Fung Kat Heung (逢吉鄉)
- Kam Tin San Tsuen
- Kam Tin Shi
- Kam Hing Wai (錦慶圍)
- Kat Hing Wai
- Ko Po Tsuen
- Sha Po Tsuen
- Shui Mei Tsuen
- Shui Tau Tsuen
- Tai Hong Wai (泰康圍)
- Tsz Tong Tsuen
- Wing Lung Wai

==== Pat Heung Rural Committee ====
八鄉鄉事委員會

- Cheung Kong Tsuen
- Ng Ka Tsuen
- Pang Ka Tsuen
- Tai Kong Po Tsuen
- Tsat Sing Kong Tsuen
- A Kung Tin
- Cheung Po Tsuen
- Chuk Hang Tsuen
- Ha Che Tsuen
- Ho Pui Tsuen
- Kam Tsin Wai Tsuen
- Kap Lung Tsuen
- Lai Ka Tsz
- Leung Uk Tsuen
- Lin Fa Tei
- Wang Toi Shan Lo Uk Tsuen
- Ma On Kong Tsuen
- Ngau Keng Tsuen
- San Lung Wai
- Shek Kong Tsuen
- Shek Tau Wai
- Shek Wu Tong Tsuen
- Sheung Che Tsuen
- Sheung Tsuen
- Shui Lau Tin Tsuen
- Shui Tsan Tin Tsuen
- Ta Shek Wu Tsuen
- Tai Kek
- Tai Wo Tsuen
- Tin Sam Tsuen
- Wang Toi Shan
- Wang Toi Shan San Tsuen
- Wang Toi Shan Wing Ning Lei Tsuen
- Yau Uk Tsuen
- Yuen Kong Tsuen
- Yuen Kong San Tsuen
- Lui Kung Tin Tsuen
- Wang Toi Shan Ha San Uk Tsuen
- Wang Toi Shan Ho Lik Pui Tsuen
- Wang Toi Shan San Tsuen

==== Ping Shan Rural Committee ====
屏山鄉事委員會

- Shek Po Tsuen
- Tan Kwai Tsuen
- Chung Sam Wai (中心圍 or 忠心圍)
- Fuk Hing Tsuen
- Fui Sha Wai
- Fung Chi Tsuen
- Ha Mei San Tsuen
- Hang Mei Tsuen
- Hang Tau Tsuen
- Hung Uk Tsuen
- Hung Yun Tsuen
- Kiu Tau Wai
- Lam Hau Tsuen
- Lam Uk Tsuen
- Ng Uk Tsuen
- Ping Shan Tsai
- Pak Sha Tsai
- Sai Tau Wai
- Ping Shan San Tsuen
- Shan Ha Tsuen
- Sheung Cheung Wai
- Shing Uk Tsuen
- Shui Pin Tsuen
- Shui Pin Wai
- Tai Tsang Wai
- Tong Fong Tsuen
- Tung Tau Tsuen
- Wing Ning Tsuen
- Yeung Uk Tsuen
- Tong Yan San Tsuen
- Tai Tao Tsuen
- Tung Tau Wai
- Tung Tau Wai San Tsuen
- Ting Fook Villas
- Yuk Yat Garden
- Chung Hing San Tsuen

==== San Tin Rural Committee ====
新田鄉事委員會

- Chau Tau Tsuen (洲頭) **(2)**
- Fan Tin Tsuen
- Ha Chuk Yuen
- Ha San Wai
- Lok Ma Chau
- Ma Tso Lung San Tsuen
- Mai Po San Tsuen
- Mai Po Lo Wai
- Ming Tak Tong
- Ngau Tam Mei
- On Lung Tsuen
- Pak Shek Au
- Pok Wai
- Pun Uk Tsuen
- San Lung Tsuen
- San Tin San Wai
- Shek Wu Wai
- Sheung Chuk Yuen
- Sheung San Wai
- Tai Shang Wai
- Tsing Lung Tsuen
- Tung Chan Wai
- Wai Tsai Tsuen
- Wing Ping Tsuen
- Yan Shau Wai

==== Shap Pat Heung Rural Committee ====
十八鄉鄉事委員會

- Au Tau
- Choi Uk Tsuen (蔡屋村)
- Ha Yau Tin Tsuen
- Hung Tin Tsuen
- Hung Tso Tin Tsuen
- Kik Yeung Tsuen
- Kong Tau San Tsuen
- Kong Tau Tsuen
- Lung Tin Tsuen
- Ma Tin Tsuen
- Muk Kiu Tau Tsuen
- Nam Hang Tsuen
- Nam Pin Wai
- Nga Yiu Tau
- Pak Sha Tsuen
- Pak Sha Wo Liu
- Sai Pin Wai
- Shan Pui Tsuen
- Sham Chung Tsuen
- Sheung Yau Tin Tsuen
- Shui Tin Tsuen
- Shui Tsiu Lo Wai
- Shui Tsiu San Tsuen
- Shung Ching San Tsuen
- Sze Tsz Uk
- Tai Kei Leng
- Tai Kiu
- Tai Tong Tsuen
- Tai Wai Tsuen
- Tin Liu Tsuen
- Tong Tau Po Tsuen
- Tung Shing Lei
- Tung Tau Tsuen
- Wong Nai Tun Tsuen
- Wong Uk Tsuen
- Yeung Uk Tsuen
- Ying Lung Wai
- Yuen Long Kau Hui
- Chuk Hang
- Kwan Lok San Tsuen
- Small Traders New Village

=== Tuen Mun District ===
==== Tuen Mun Rural Committee ====
屯門鄉事委員會

- Chung Uk Tsuen (鍾屋村) **(2)**

=== Tsuen Wan and Kwai Tsing District ===
==== Ma Wan Rural Committee ====
馬灣鄉事委員會

- **Chok Ko Wan and Pa Tau Kwu** (竹篙灣及扒頭鼓)
- Luk Keng (鹿頸)

==== Tsing Yi Rural Committee ====
青衣鄉事委員會

Note: The brackets are, (No. of Indigenous Inhabitant Representatives [原居民代表], No. of Resident Representatives [居民代表]) in the Tsing Yi Rural Committee. The villages with no bracketed numbers have no representatives in the committee.

- Chung Mei Tsuen (涌美村) (3,1)
- Lo Uk Tsuen (老屋村) (1,1)

Note: Chung Mei Tsuen and Lo Uk Tsuen are combined into one village called Chung Mei Lo Uk Tsuen (涌尾老屋村). Tsing Yi residents prefer to call this village Chung Mei Tsuen.

- Tai Wong Ha New Village (大王下新村) or Tai Wong Ha Tsuen (大王下村) (5,1)
- Sun Uk New Village (新屋新村) or San Uk Tsuen (新屋村) (1,1)
- Yim Tin Kok New Village (鹽田角新村) or Yim Tin Kok Tsuen (鹽田角村) (1,1)
- Lam Tin New Village (藍田新村) or Lam Tin Tsuen (藍田村) (2,1)

Note: The above four villages were relocated together and are usually referred as Sai Tsuen (四村), lit. four villages.

- Fung Shue Wo New Village (楓樹窩新村) or Fung Shu Wo Tsuen (楓樹窩村) (1,0)

Note: In Fung Shue Wo, there are two villages namely Tsing Yu New Village (青裕新村), and Tsing Yi Hui (青衣墟), lit. Tsing Yi Market.

- **Fishermen's Village and St. Paul's Village (漁民村及聖保祿村)** (0,1)
- Tsing Yi Lutheran (信義新村)
- Liu To (寮肚村)
- Ko Tan (高灘村)
- Sai Shan Village (細山村)

==== Tsuen Wan Rural Committee ====
荃灣鄉事委員會

- Chuen Lung (川龍) **(3)**
- Chung Kwai Chung (中葵涌) **(3)**
- Kwan Mun Hau Tsuen (關門口村)

=== Islands District ===
==== Cheung Chau Rural Committee ====
長洲鄉事委員會

==== Lamma Island (North) Rural Committee ====
南丫島北段鄉事委員會

- Ko Long (高塱)
- Lo Tik Wan (蘆荻灣)
- Pak Kok Kau Tsuen (北角舊村)
- Pak Kok San Tsuen (北角新村)
- Sha Po (沙埔)
- Tai Peng Tsuen (大坪村)
- Tai Wan Kau Tsuen (大灣舊村)
- Tai Yuen (大園)
- Wang Long (橫塱)
- Yung Shue Long (榕樹塱)
- Yung Shue Wan (榕樹灣)

==== Lamma Island (South) Rural Committee ====
南丫島南段鄉事委員會

- Lo So Shing (蘆鬚城)
- Luk Chau (鹿洲)
- Mo Tat (模達)
- Mo Tat Wan (模達灣)
- Po Toi (蒲台)
- Sok Kwu Wan (索罟灣)
- Tung O (東澳)
- Yung Shue Ha (榕樹下)

==== Mui Wo Rural Committee ====
梅窩鄉事委員會

- Chung Hau (North) (涌口(北))
- Chung Hau (South) (涌口(南))

Ha Tsuen Long

- Luk Tei Tong (鹿地塘)
- Man Kok Tsui (萬角咀)
- Ngau Kwu Long (牛牯塱)
- Pak Mong (白芒)
- Pak Ngan Heung (白銀鄉)
- Tai Ho (大蠔)
- Tai Tei Tong (大地塘)
- Wo Tin (窩田)

==== Peng Chau Rural Committee ====
坪洲鄉事委員會

- **Nim Shu Wan** (稔樹灣)
- Tai Pak (大白) (not an existing village)

==== South Lantao Rural Committee ====
大嶼山南區鄉事委員會

- Cheung Sha Lower Village (長沙下村)
- Cheung Sha Upper Village (長沙上村)
- Tong Fuk Village (塘福)

==== Tai O Rural Committee ====
大澳鄉事委員會

- Fan Lau (汾流)

==== Tung Chung Rural Committee ====
東涌鄉事委員會

- Chek Lap Kok (赤鱲角)

== Others ==
Former villages are italicised.

=== New Kowloon ===
- Cha Kwo Ling Village (茶果嶺村)
- Fung Wong San Chuen (鳳王新村)
- Grand View Village (大觀村)
- Hau Wong Temple New Village (候王廟新村)
- Ling Nam San Tsuen (嶺南新村)
- Ma Chai Hang Tsuen (馬仔坑村)
- Man Kuk New Tsuen (文谷新村)
- Nga Tsin Wai Tsuen (衙前圍村)
- Ngau Chi Wan Tsuen (牛池灣村)
- Ping Ting Tsuen (平頂村)
- Po Kong Tsuen (蒲崗村)
- Pok Oi Tsuen (博愛村)
- Pui Man Tsuen (培民村)
- Sam Ka Tsuen (三家村)
- Shanghai Tsuen (上海村)
- Sze Hai Tsuen (四喜村)
- Tai Hom Village (大磡村)
  - Ha Yuen Leng and Sheung Yuen Leng (formerly Kowloon Yuen Leng) (下元嶺, 上元嶺, 九龍元嶺)
- Tai Hom Woi Tsuen (大磡窩村)
- Tai Koon Yuen (大觀園)
- Tong Ning New San Tsuen (唐寧新村)
- Tung Shan Tsuen (東山村)
- Tung Wo Tsuen (東和村)
- Yan Oi San Tsuen (仁愛新村)
- Yan Yee San Tsuen (仁義新村)

== Villages and former villages on Hong Kong Island and in Kowloon ==
Former villages are italicised.

=== Hong Kong Island ===
- A Kung Ngam Village (阿公岩村)
- Aldrich Village (愛秩序村)
- Big Wave Bay Village (大浪灣村)
- Ching Man Village (正民村)
- Fu Tau Wat Village (富斗窟村)
- Healthy Village (健康村)
- Hing Wah Village (興華村)
- Hok Tsui Village
- Holy Cross Path Village (聖十字徑村)
- Kau Man Village (教民村)
- Ma Shan Village (馬山村)
- Nan On Fong Village (南安坊村)
- O Pui Lung Shan Teng Village (澳貝龍山頂村)
- O Pui Lung Village (澳貝龍村)
- Pok Fu Lam Tsuen (薄扶林村)
- Shek O Village (石澳村)
- Shek O New Village (石澳新村)
- Tai Ping Village (太平村)
- Tsin Shui Ma Tau Village (淺水碼頭村)
- Wang Hang Tsai Village (橫坑仔村)
- Wang Hang Tung Village (橫坑東村)
- Wesley Village (衛斯理村)

=== Kowloon ===
- Tsim Sha Tsui Village (尖沙嘴村)
- Ma Tau Wai (馬頭圍, formerly 古瑾圍)

== See also ==
- List of villages in China
- Walled villages of Hong Kong
- List of cities and towns in Hong Kong
- List of places in Hong Kong
- List of buildings and structures in Hong Kong
- Heung Yee Kuk
- Rural committee
- Rural Representative elections
