= Nam Hang =

Nam Hang is the name of several places in Hong Kong:

- Nam Hang, Tai Po District, a village in Tai Po District
- Nam Hang Tsuen, a village in the Shap Pat Heung area of Yuen Long District
