= Lung Mei =

Lung Mei is the name of several places in Hong Kong, including:

- Lung Mei, Sai Kung District in Sai Kung District
- Lung Mei, Tai Po District in Tai Po District
