= Tai Wan Village, Sai Kung District =

Coordinates: 22.39505°N 114.277685°E

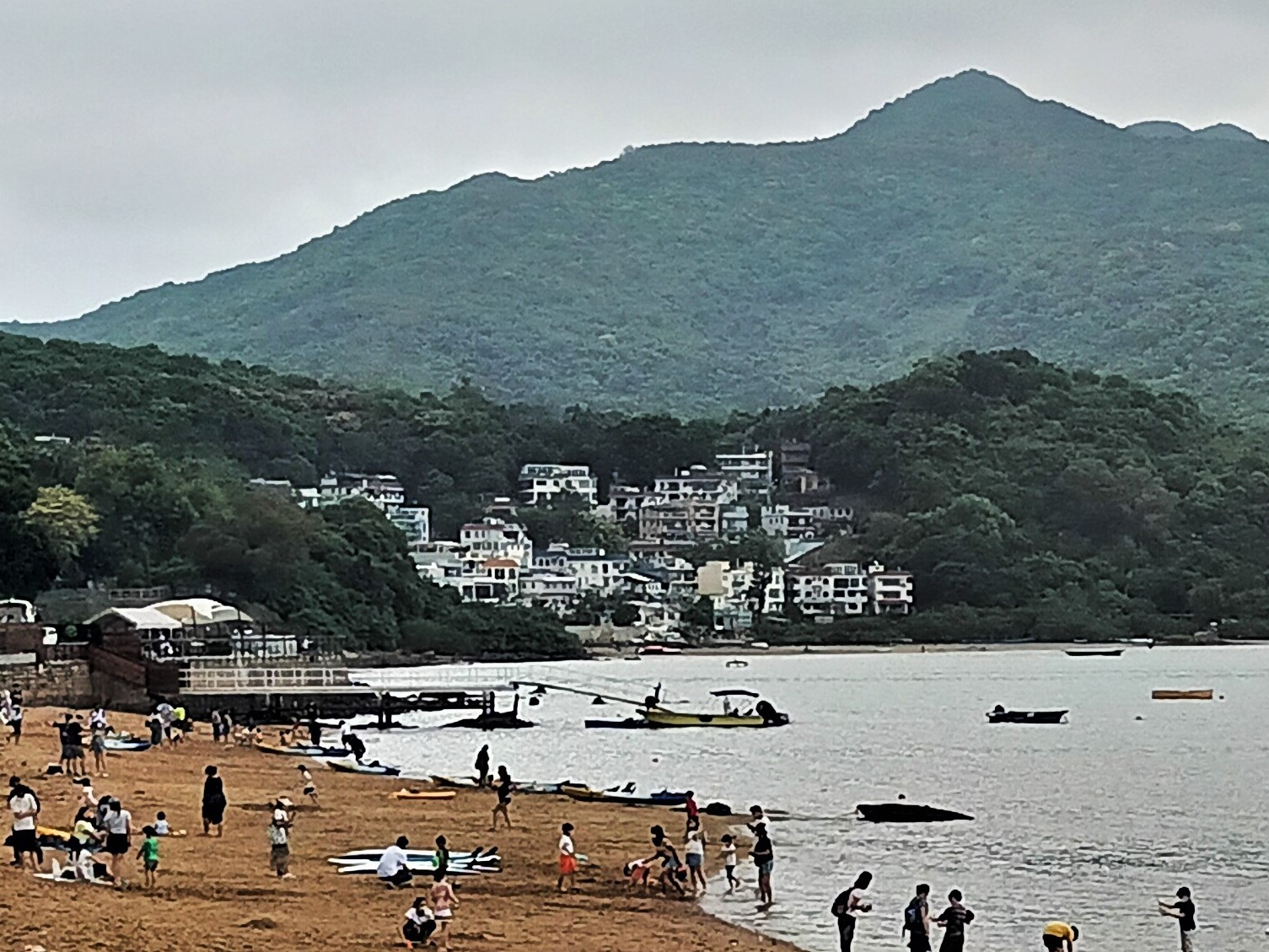
Tai Wan Village viewed from Sha Ha Beach (沙下灘).

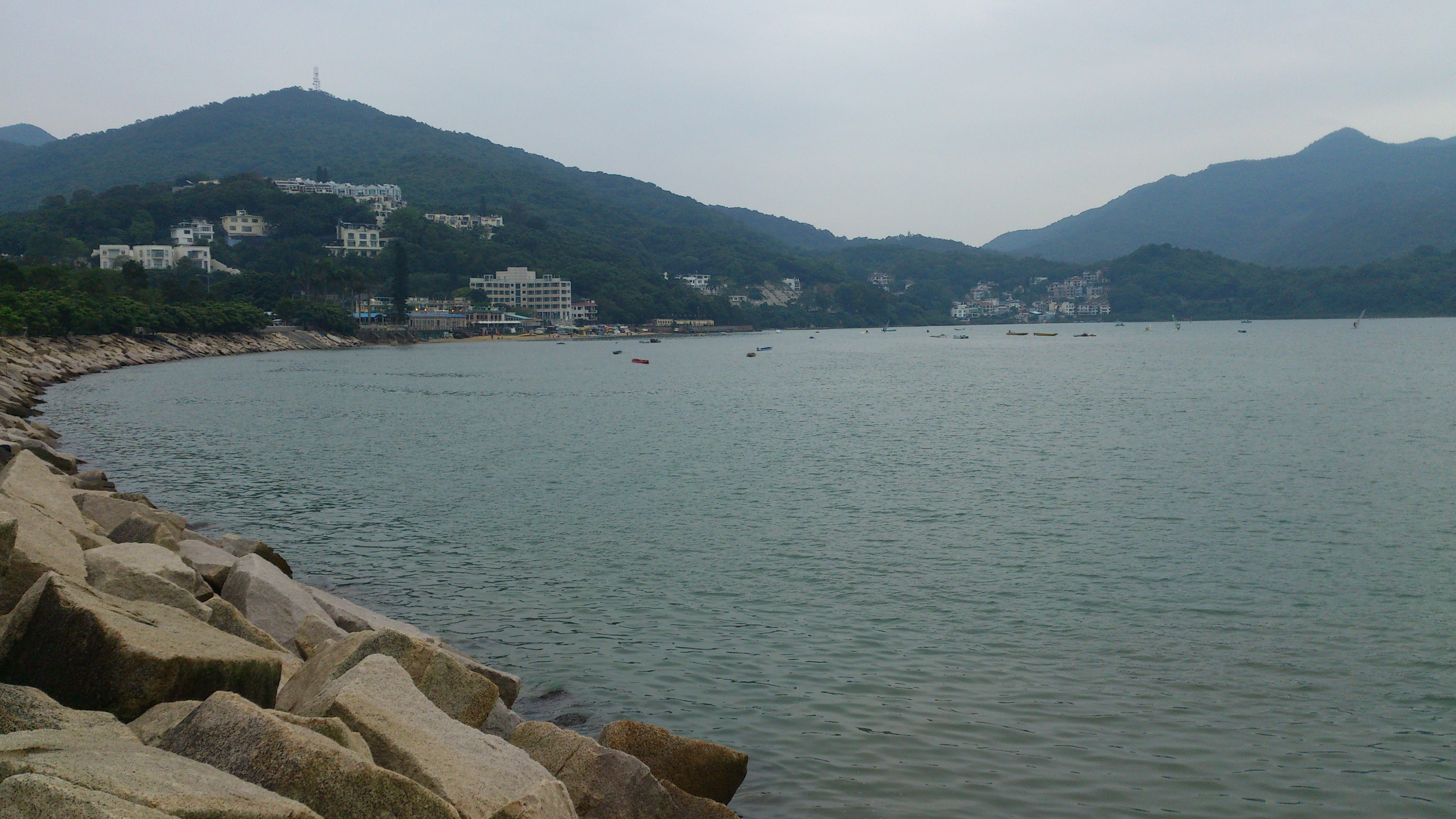
Distrant view of Tai Wan Village (centre right).

Tai Wan (Chinese: 大環) or Tai Wan Village (Chinese: 大環村) is a village in Sai Kung District, Hong Kong.

== Administration ==
Tai Wan is a recognized village under the New Territories Small House Policy.
