= Nam Shan Tung =

Village in Hong Kong

Coordinates: 22.4494524°N 114.3108129°E

Nam Shan Tung (Chinese: 南山洞) is a village of in the Sai Kung North area of Tai Po District, Hong Kong.

== Administration ==
Nam Shan Tung is a recognized village under the New Territories Small House Policy.
