= On Lung Tsuen =

Coordinates: 22.500941°N 114.075375°E

On Lung Tsuen (Chinese: 安龍村), also transliterated as On Loong Tsuen, is a village in the San Tin area of Yuen Long District, Hong Kong.

== Administration ==
On Loong Tsuen is a recognized village under the New Territories Small House Policy.
