= O Long Village =

Village in Sai Kung District, Hong Kong

Coordinates: 22.380174°N 114.263662°E

O Long Village (Chinese: 澳朗村) is a village in Sai Kung District, Hong Kong.
