= Chuk Hang =

Coordinates: 22.448574°N 114.09782°E

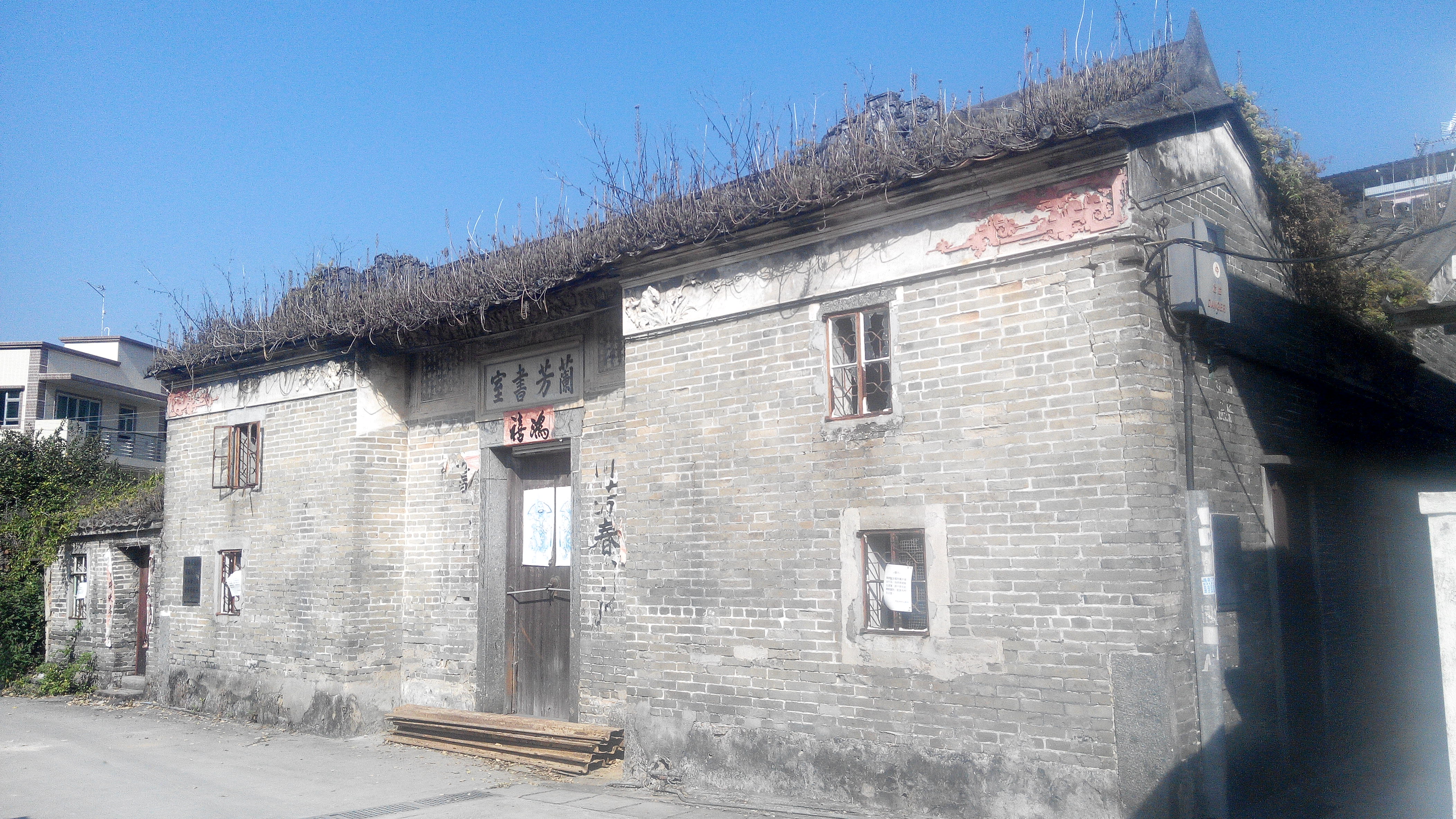
Lan Fong Study Hall in Chuk Hang.

Chuk Hang (Chinese: 竹坑) is a village in Pat Heung, Yuen Long District, Hong Kong.

== Administration ==
Chuk Hang is a recognized village under the New Territories Small House Policy.
