= Uk Tau =

Village in Hong Kong

Coordinates: 22.4281°N 114.3278°E

Uk Tau (Chinese: 屋頭) is a small village in the northern Sai Kung Peninsula, in the Tai Po District of Hong Kong's New Territories, lying along Pak Tam Road approximately halfway between Pak Tam Chung and Hoi Ha Wan.

The village supports a resident population of approximately twenty people, the majority of whom are expatriates. Very little land is under cultivation. Lying, as it does, within the boundaries of Sai Kung West Country Park, Uk Tau is surrounded by dense forest, and is frequently visited by wildlife such as macaque, cobra, krait, wild pigs, porcupine, feral animals and many bird and insect species.

== Administration ==
Uk Tau is a recognized village under the New Territories Small House Policy.

== History ==
At the time of the 1911 census, the population of Uk Tau was 27. The number of males was 10.
