= Tai Che =

Village in Hong Kong

Coordinates: 22.381325°N 114.218914°E

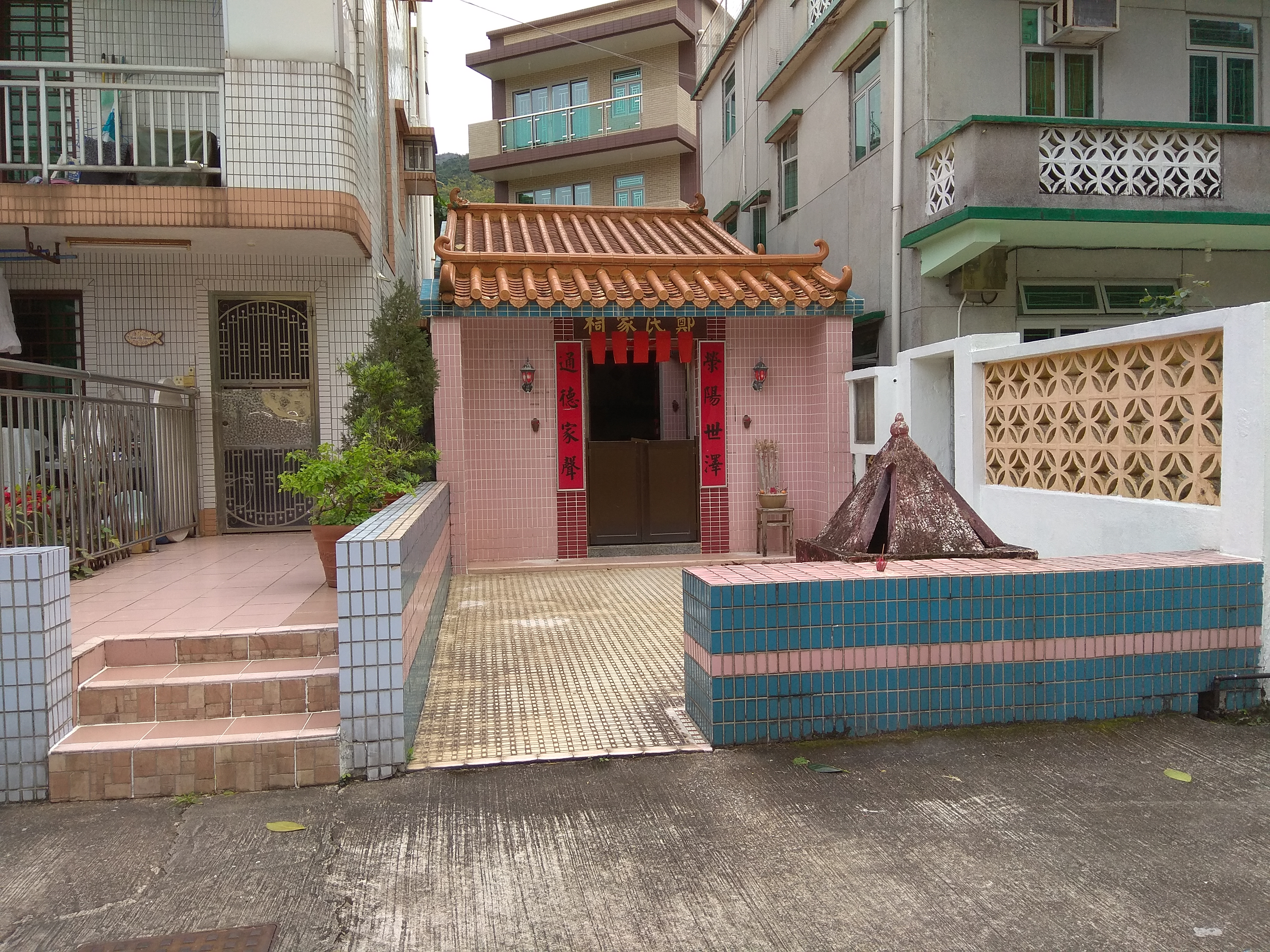
Ancestral hall in Tai Che.

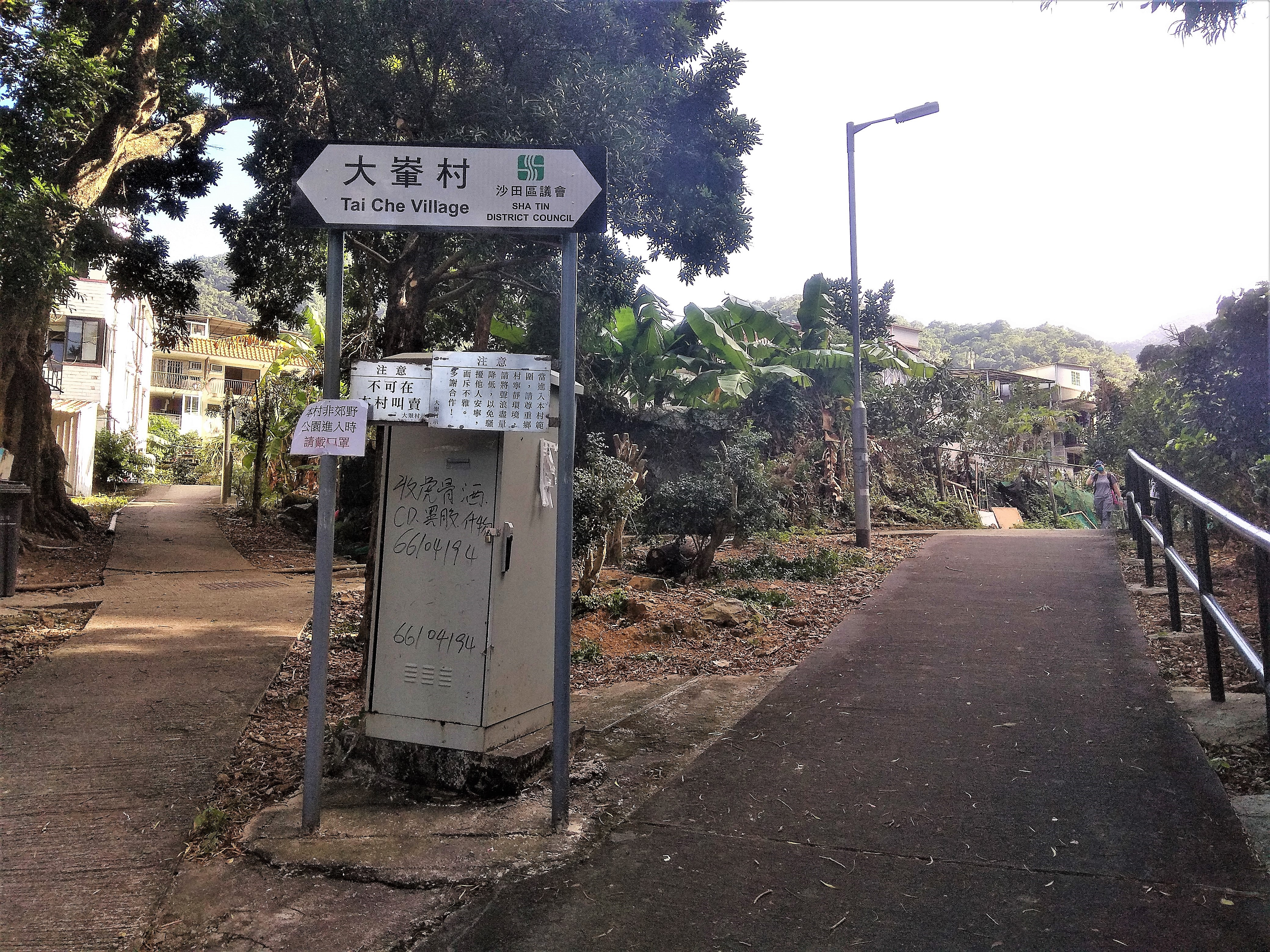
Tai Che.

Tai Che (Chinese: 大輋) is a village in the Siu Lek Yuen area of Sha Tin District, Hong Kong.

== Administration ==
Tai Che is a recognized village under the New Territories Small House Policy.

== History ==
At the time of the 1911 census, the population of Tai Che was 18. The number of males was 7.
