= Tong Kung Leng =

Village in Sheung Shui, Hong Kong

Coordinates: 22.4875477°N 114.10835°E

Tong Kung Leng (Chinese: 唐公嶺) is a village in Sheung Shui, North District, Hong Kong.

== Administration ==
Tong Kung Leng is a recognized village under the New Territories Small House Policy. It is one of the villages represented within the Sheung Shui District Rural Committee. For electoral purposes, Tong Kung Leng is part of the Sheung Shui Rural constituency, which is currently represented by Simon Hau Fuk-tat.
