= Ping Tun =

Village in Hong Kong

Coordinates: 22.407173°N 114.302988°E

Ping Tun (Chinese: 坪墩) is a village in Sai Kung District, Hong Kong.

== Administration ==
Ping Tun is a recognized village under the New Territories Small House Policy.

== History ==
In 1955, Ping Tun was reported as having a population of 31, with the surname Cheung. It was described by Austin Coates as "a high village cultivating rice at a surprisingly high level".
