= She Tau =

Coordinates: 22.398079°N 114.302008°E

She Tau (Chinese: 蛇頭) is a village in Sai Kung District, Hong Kong.

== Administration ==
She Tau is a recognized village under the New Territories Small House Policy.
