= Tam Wat =

Settlement in Hong Kong

Coordinates: 22.402524°N 114.300603°E

Tam Wat (Chinese: 氹笏) is a village in Sai Kung District, Hong Kong.

== Administration ==
Tam Wat is a recognized village under the New Territories Small House Policy.
