= Pun Uk Tsuen =

Coordinates: 22.50821°N 114.081881°E

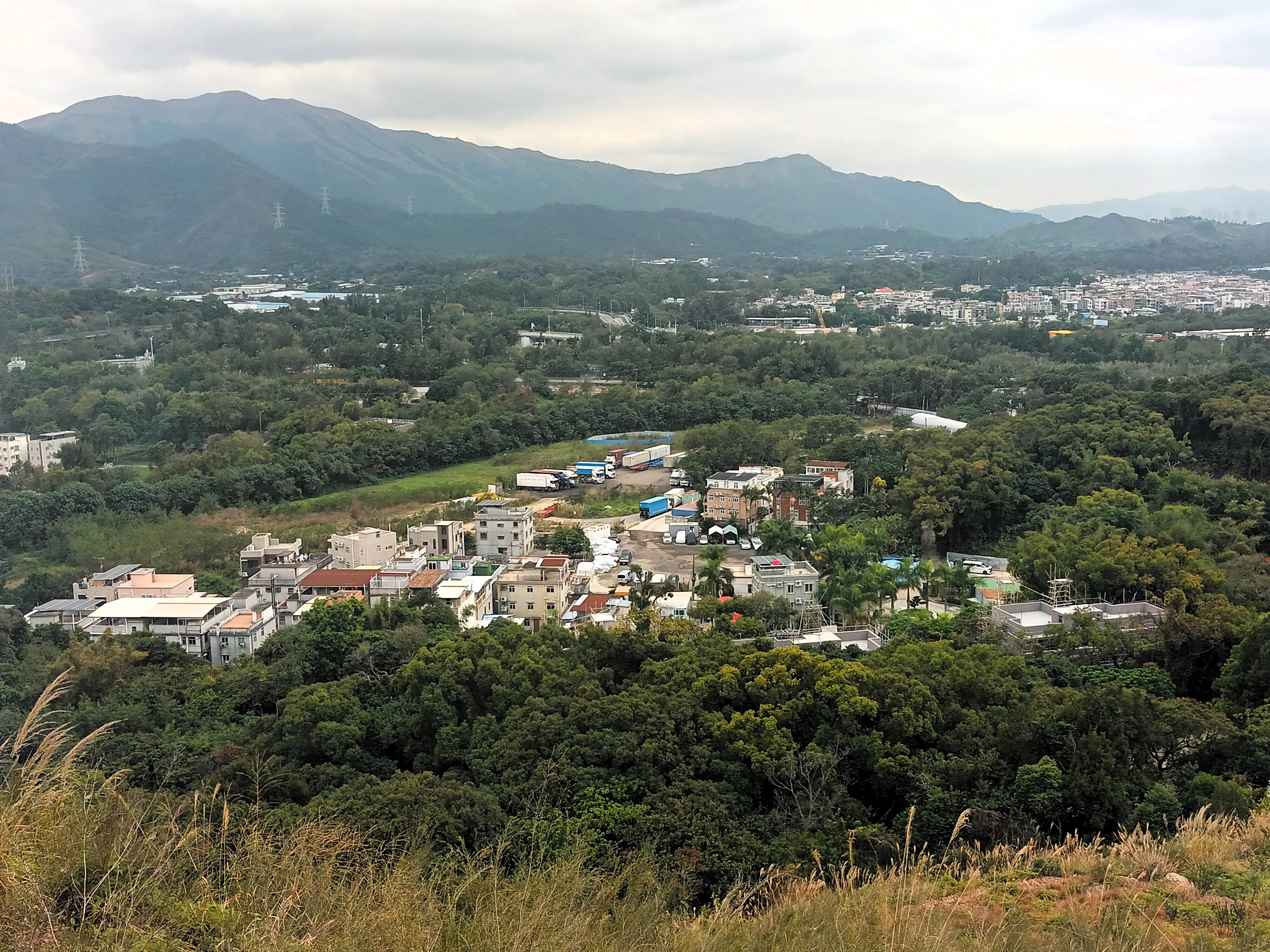
View of Pun Uk Tsuen from Tit Hang Shan (鐵坑山)

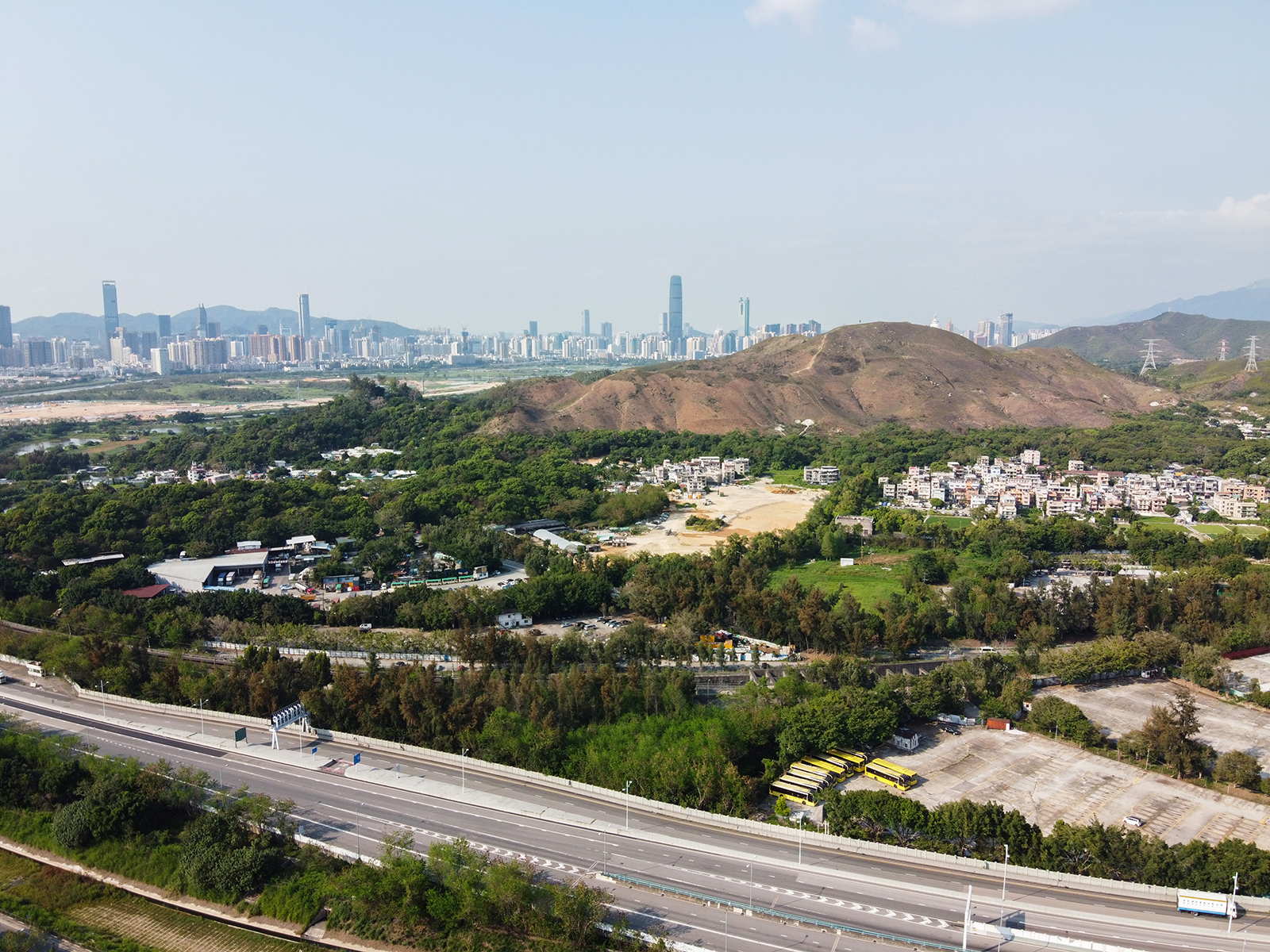
Pun Uk Tsuen and Chau Tau. The Shenzhen skyline is visible in the background.

Pun Uk Tsuen (Chinese: 潘屋村), also transliterated as Poon Uk Tsuen, is a village in Yuen Long District, Hong Kong.

== Administration ==
Poon Uk Tsuen is a recognized village under the New Territories Small House Policy.

== History ==
The village was established by the Pun (潘) family from Shaoguan in the early 15th century.
