= Wang Long (village) =

Coordinates: 22.223077°N 114.114363°E

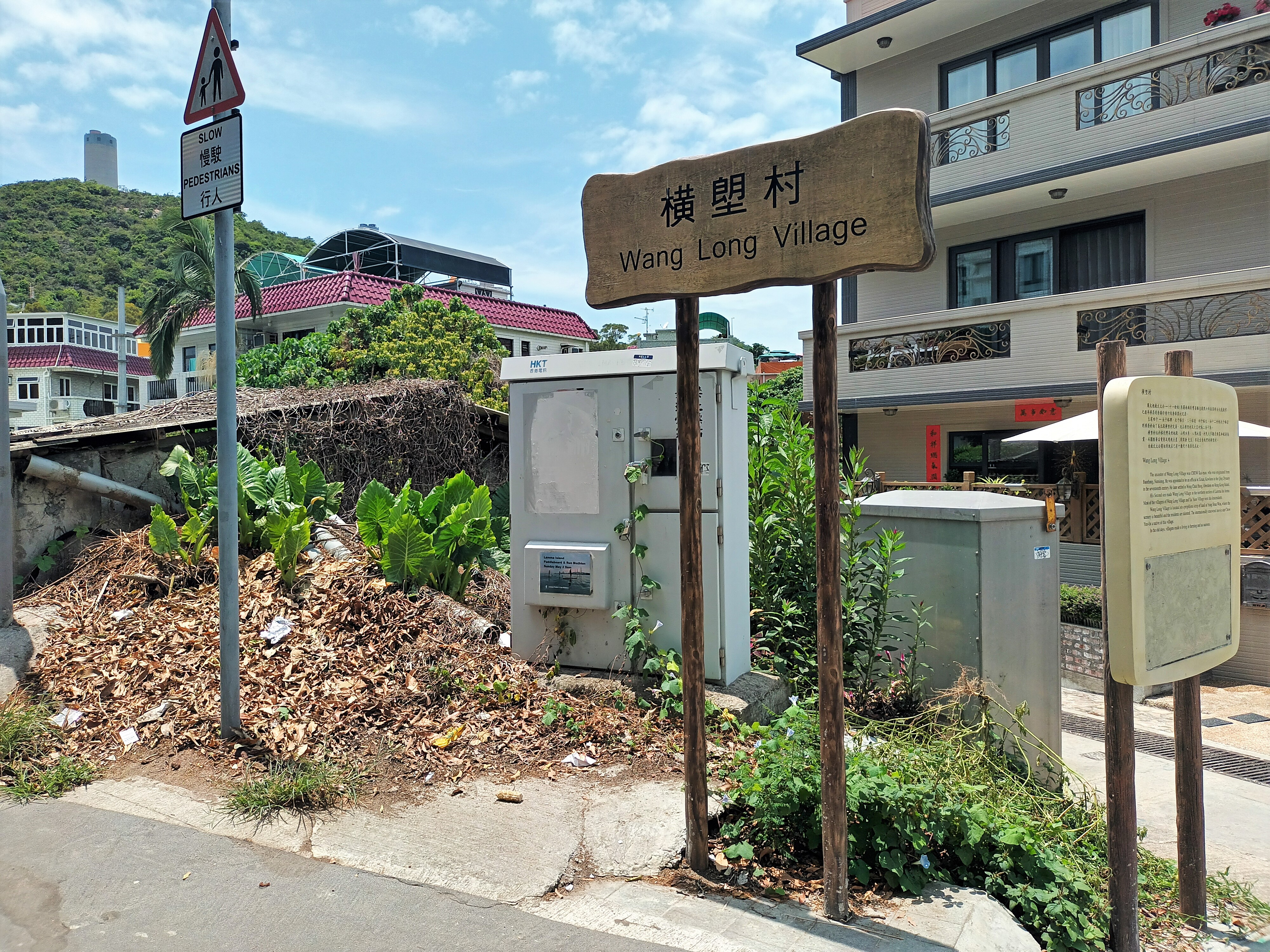
Wang Long.

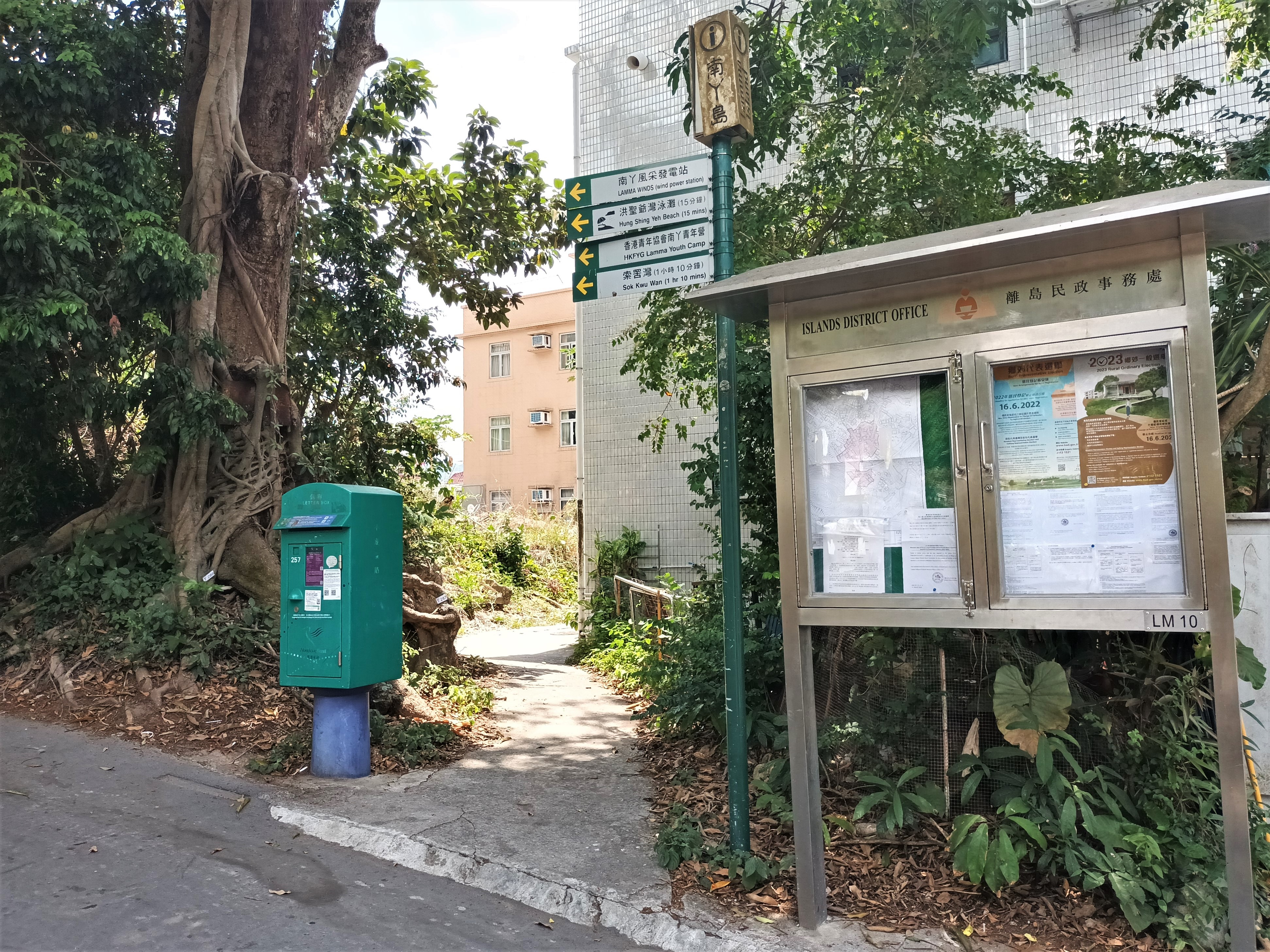
Wang Long.

Wang Long (Chinese: 橫塱) is a village located in the area of Yung Shue Wan on the North side of Lamma Island, the third largest island in the territory of Hong Kong.

== Administration ==
Wang Long is a recognized village under the New Territories Small House Policy.
