= San Kwai Tin =

Coordinates: 22.554881°N 114.192176°E

San Kwai Tin (Chinese: 新桂田) is a village in the North District of Hong Kong.

== Administration ==
San Kwai Tin is a recognized village under the New Territories Small House Policy.
