= Cheung Lek =

Village in Sheung Shui, Hong Kong

Coordinates: 22.4810081°N 114.0992109°E

Cheung Lek (Chinese: 長瀝) is a village in Sheung Shui, North District, Hong Kong.

== Administration ==
Cheung Lek is a recognized village under the New Territories Small House Policy. It is one of the villages represented within the Sheung Shui District Rural Committee. For electoral purposes, Cheung Lek is part of the Sheung Shui Rural constituency, which is currently represented by Simon Hau Fuk-tat.
