= Wang Shan Keuk =

Village in Hong Kong

Coordinates: 22.521203°N 114.171642°E

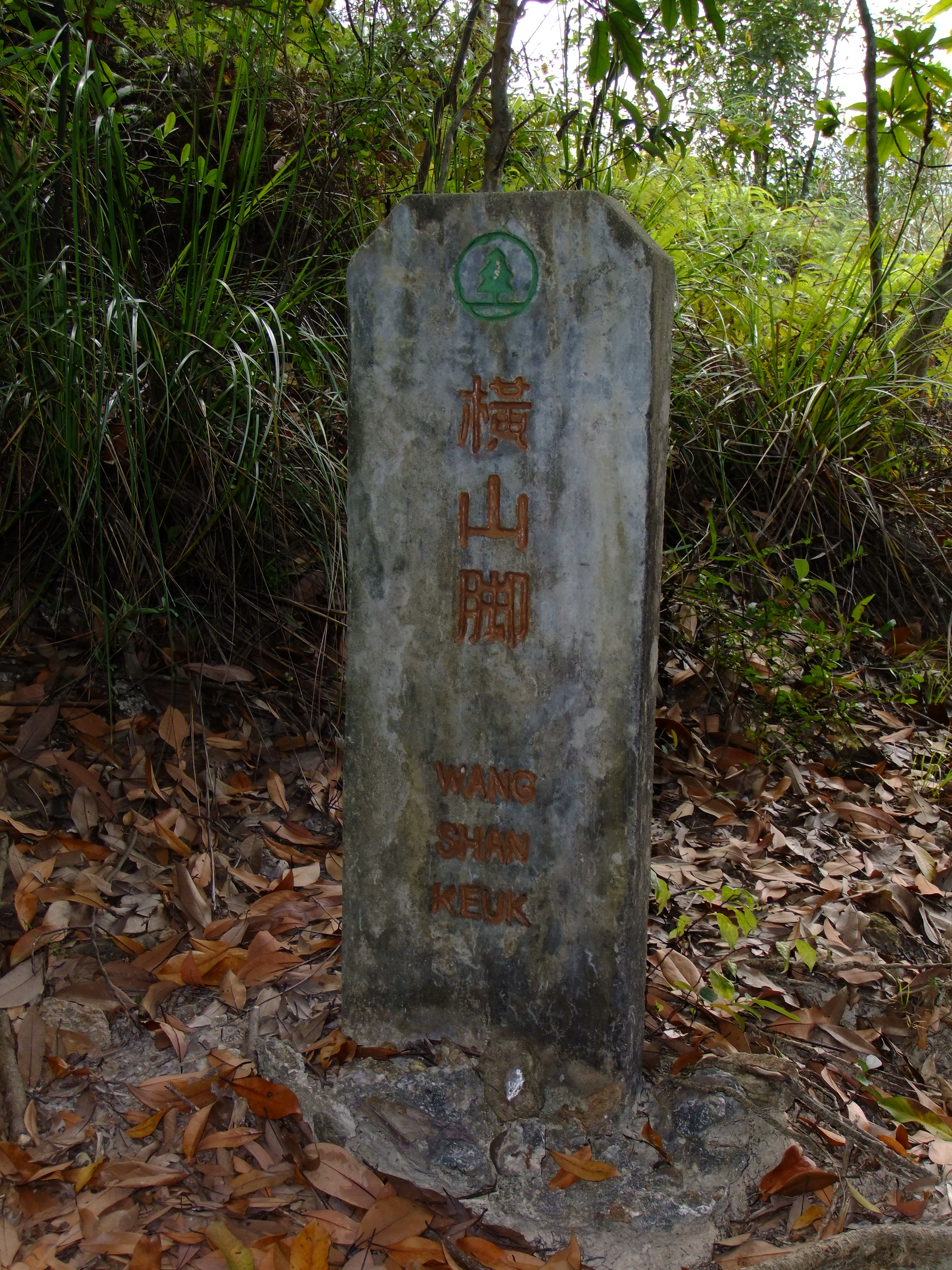
Marker of Wang Shan Keuk historical village along the Wilson Trail.

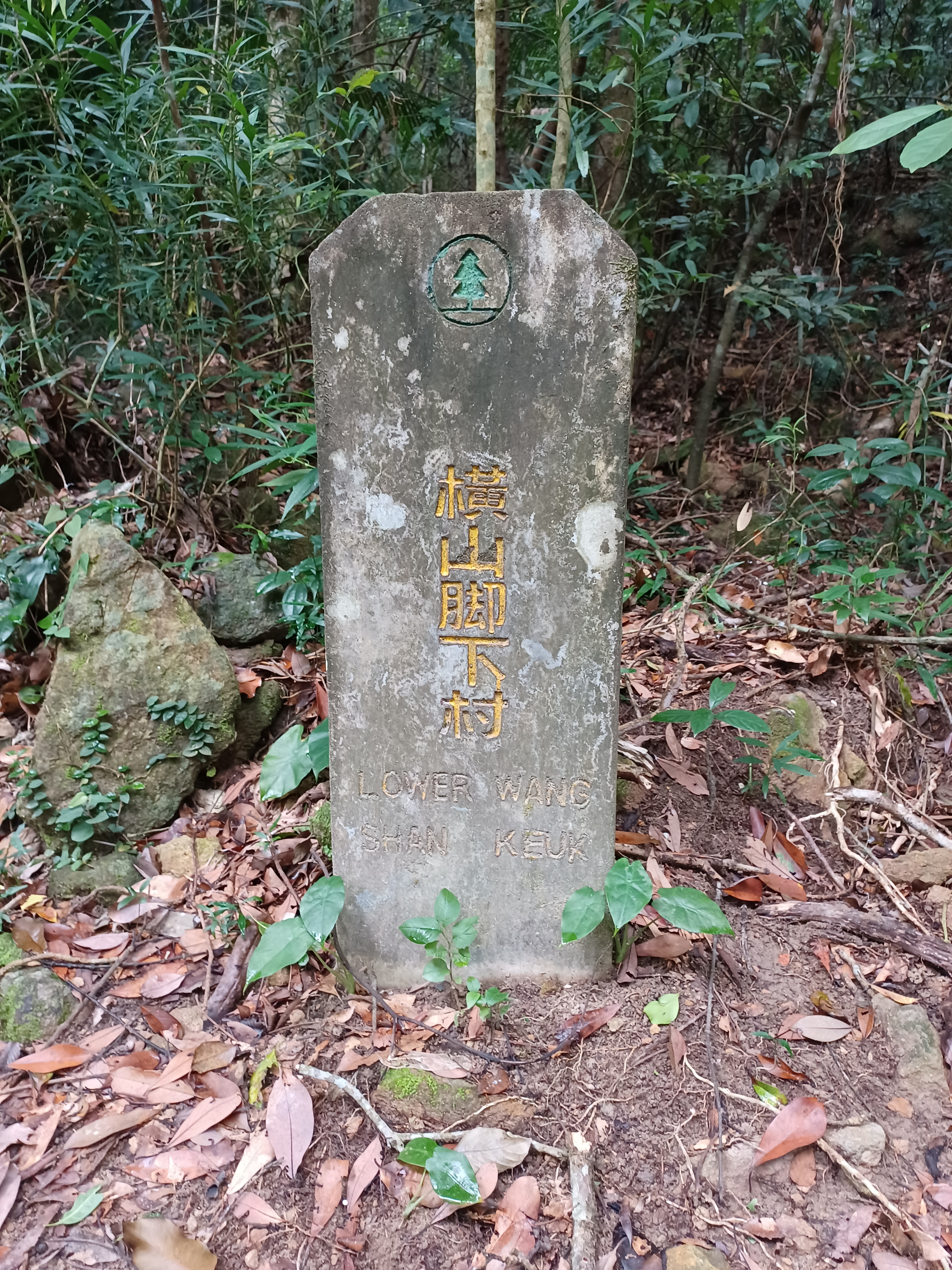
Marker of Lower Wang Shan Keuk historical village along the Wilson Trail.

Wang Shan Keuk (Chinese: 橫山腳) is a village in the North District of Hong Kong.

== Administration ==
Wang Shan Keuk is a recognized village under the New Territories Small House Policy.

== History ==
At the time of the 1911 census, the population of Ha Wang Shan Keuk (下橫山腳; 'Lower Wang Shan Keuk') was 43. The number of males was 16.
