= Pak Kok Village =

Coordinates: 22.236011°N 114.116552°E

Pak Kok
- Village
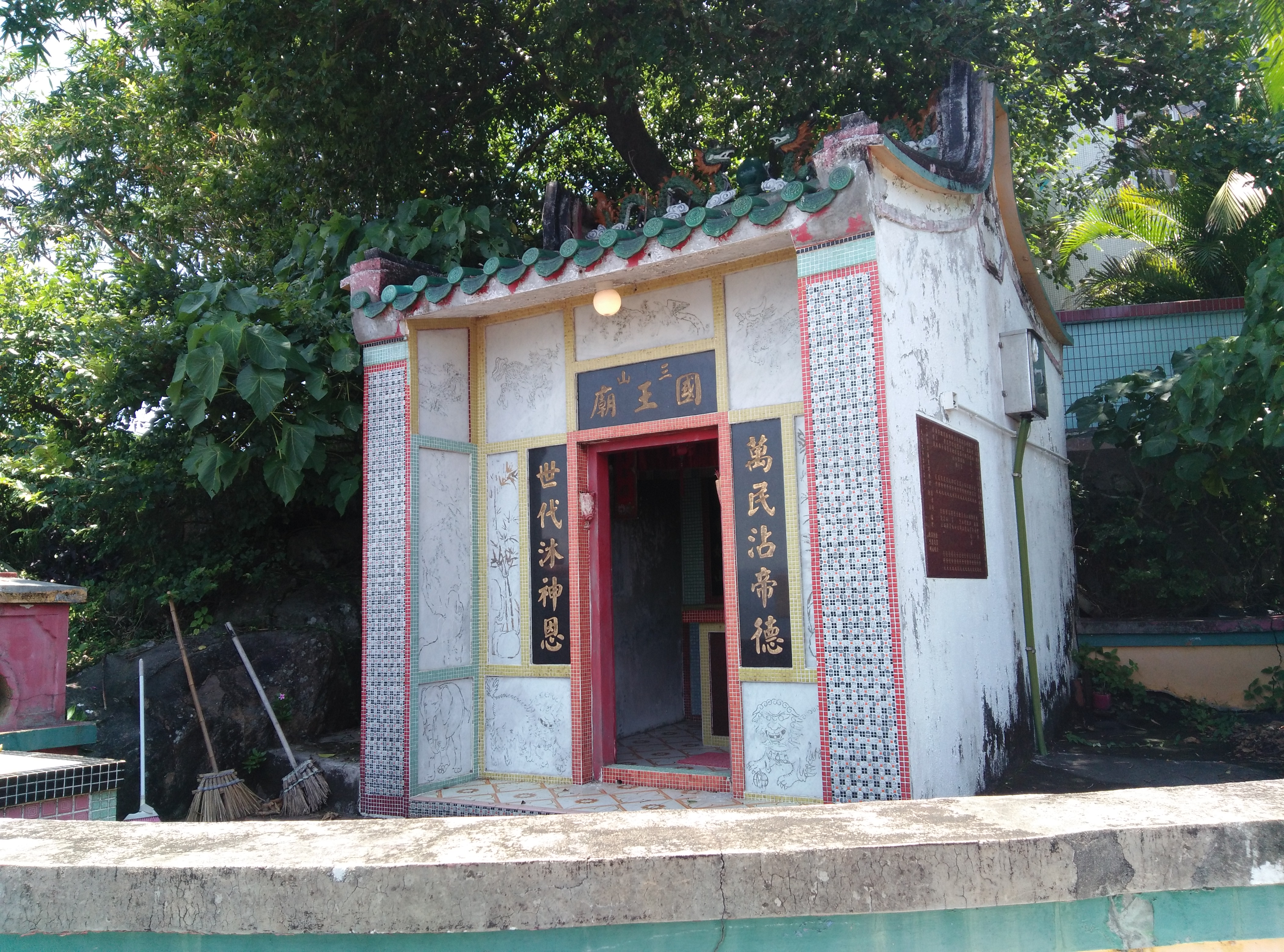
- Sam Shan Kwok Wong Temple in Pak Kok
- Interactive map of Pak Kok

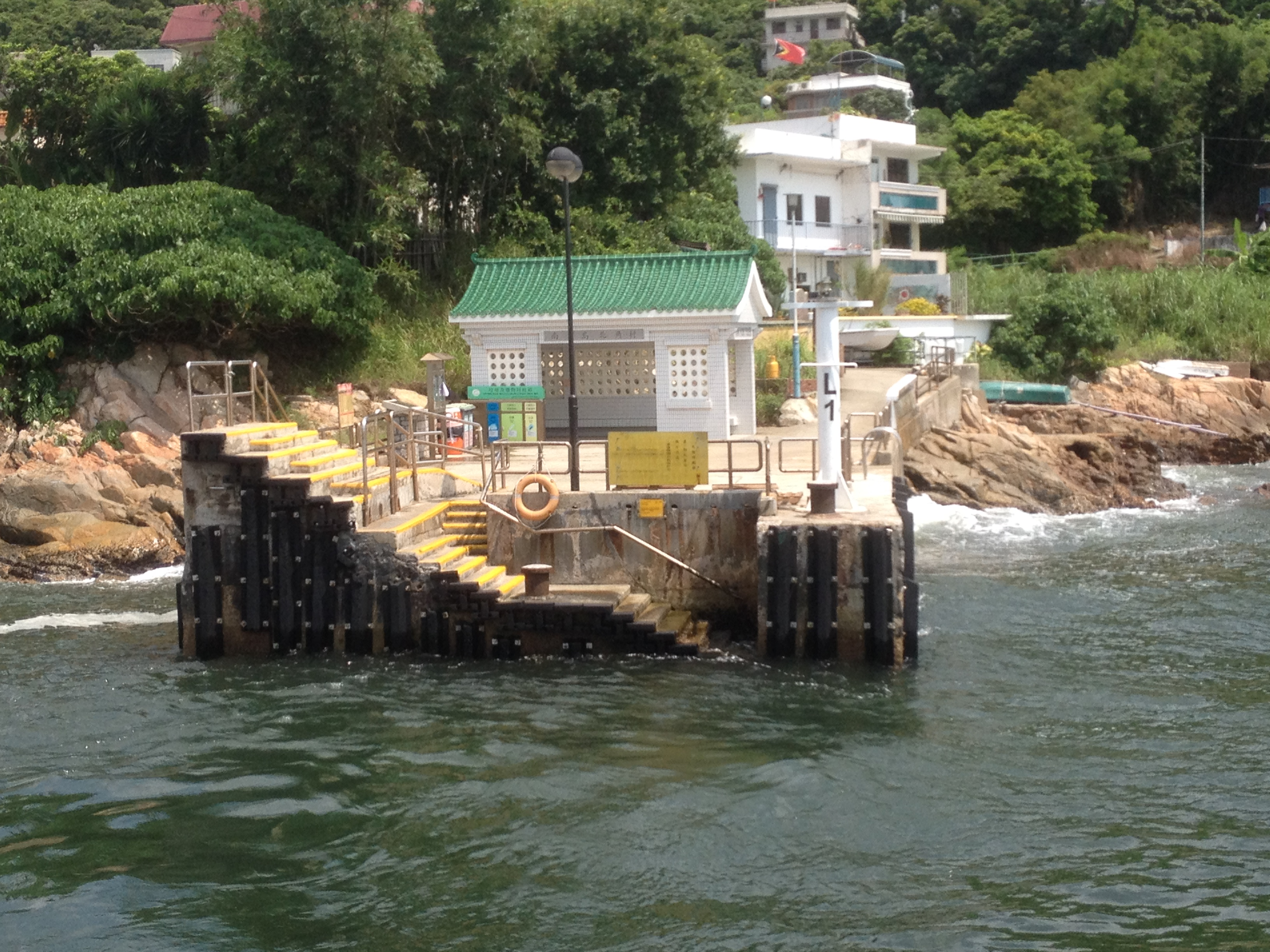
Pak Kok Pier.

Pak Kok Village (Chinese: 北角村) is a village on Lamma Island, Hong Kong. It comprises the two settlements Pak Kok Kau Tsuen (北角舊村; 'Pak Kok Old Village') and Pak Kok San Tsuen (北角新村; 'Pak Kok New Village').

== Administration ==
Pak Kok Kau Tsuen and Pak Kok San Tsuen are recognized villages under the New Territories Small House Policy.

== History ==
At the time of the 1911 census, the population of Pak Kok was 52. The number of males was 15.
