= Mai Po Tsuen =

Village in Yuen Long, Hong Kong

Coordinates: 22.492874°N 114.061091°E

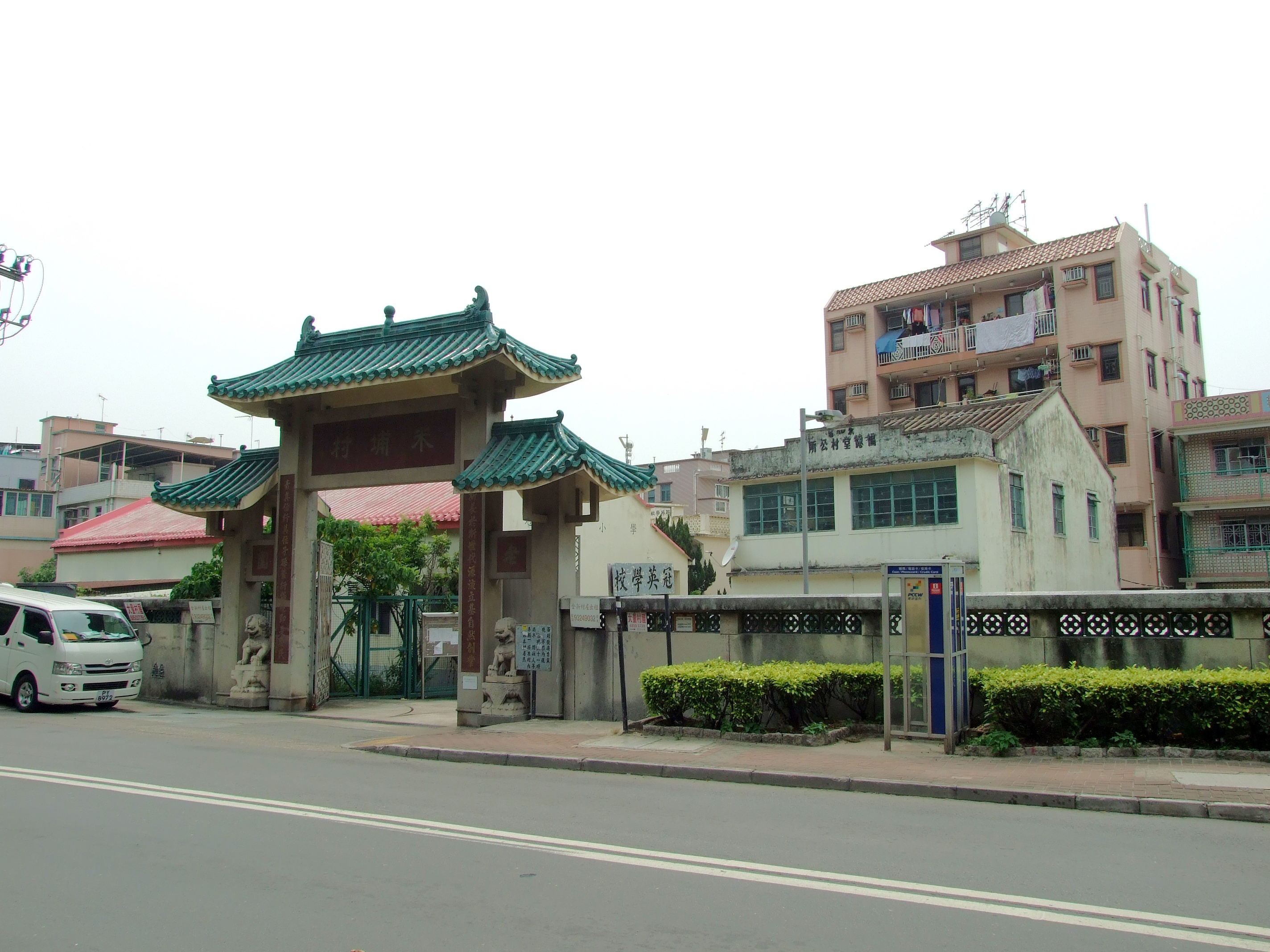
Entrance gate of Mai Po Tsuen along Castle Peak Road - Mai Po.

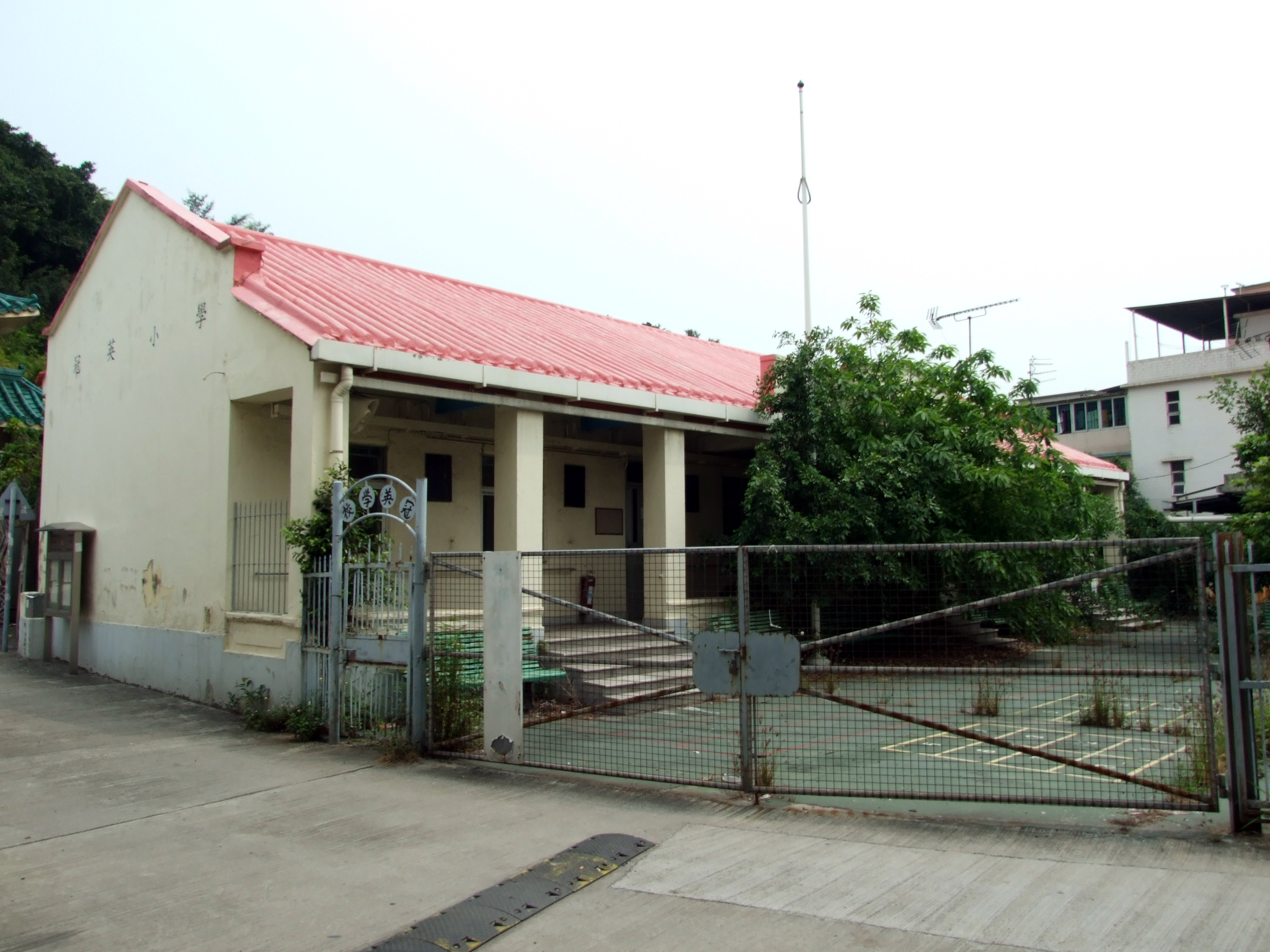
Former Koon Ying School (冠英學校) in Mai Po Tsuen.

Mai Po Tsuen (Chinese: 米埔村) is a village in Yuen Long District, Hong Kong.

It comprises Mai Po Lo Wai (米埔老圍; 'Mai Po Old Village') and Mai Po San Tsuen (米埔新村; 'Mai Po New Village').

== Administration ==
Mai Po Tsuen is a recognized village under the New Territories Small House Policy.

== See also ==
- Mai Po Marshes
