= Lai Chi Shan =

Village in Tai Po District, Hong Kong

Coordinates: 22.437724°N 114.165477°E

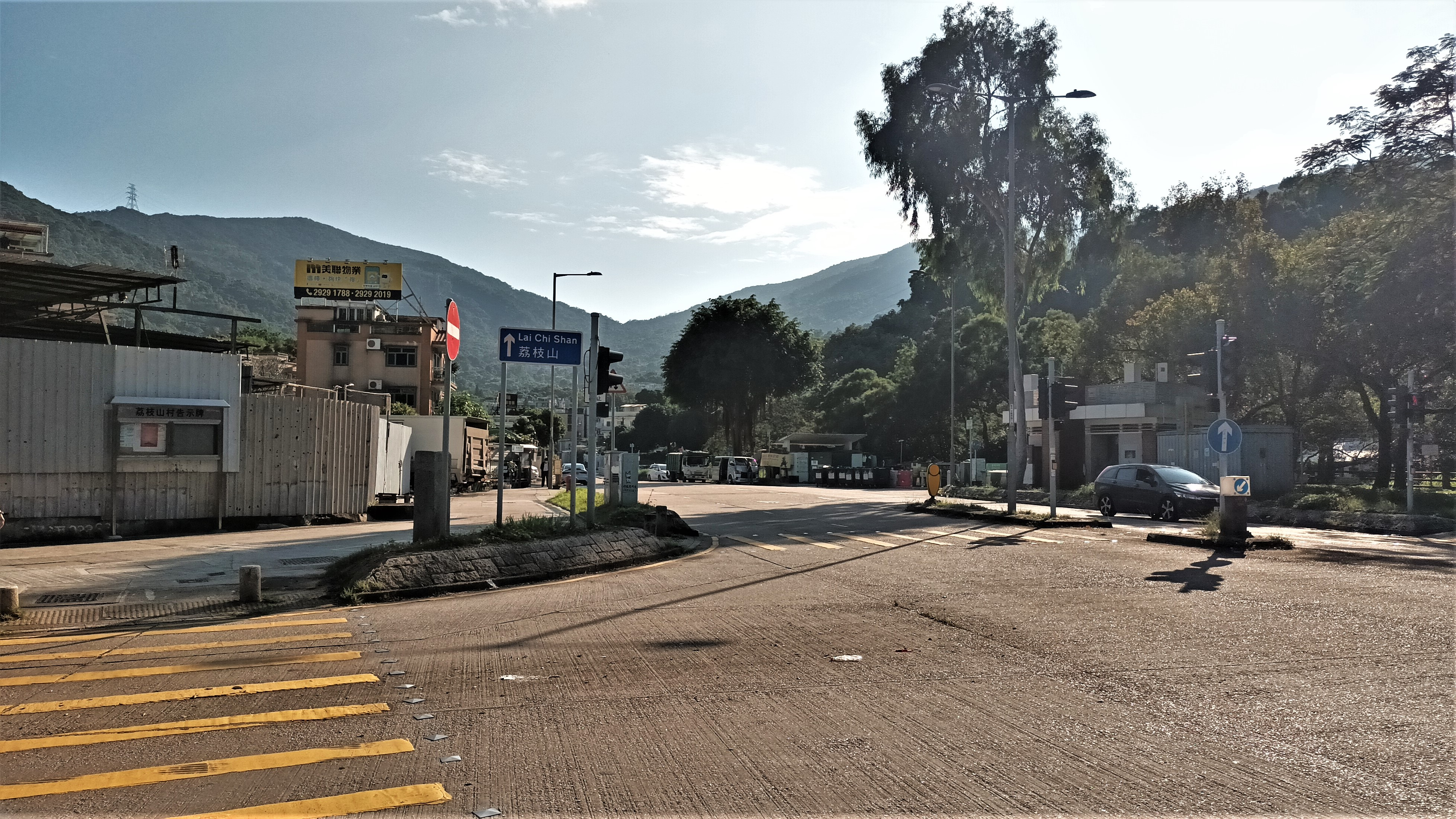
Tat Wan Road (達運道) at Lai Chi Shan.

Lai Chi Shan (Chinese: 荔枝山) is a village in Tai Po District, Hong Kong.

== Administration ==
Lai Chi Shan is a recognised village under the New Territories Small House Policy. It is one of the villages represented within the Tai Po Rural Committee. For electoral purposes, Lai Chi Shan is part of the Tai Po Kau constituency, which is currently represented by Patrick Mo Ka-chun.

== History ==
At the time of the 1911 census, the population of Lai Chi Shan was 97. The number of males was 40.
