= Wo Liu =

Village in Hong Kong

Coordinates: 22.399411°N 114.27984°E

Wo Liu (Chinese: 禾寮) is a village in Sai Kung District, Hong Kong.

== Administration ==
Wo Liu is a recognized village under the New Territories Small House Policy.
