= Yin Ngam =

Village in Hong Kong

Coordinates: 22.424185°N 114.150213°E

Yin Ngam (Chinese: 燕岩) is a village in Tai Po District, Hong Kong.

== Administration ==
Yin Ngam is a recognized village under the New Territories Small House Policy.
