= Chuk Yuen (Yuen Long District) =

Village in Yuen Long District, Hong Kong

Coordinates: 22.476641°N 114.05572°E

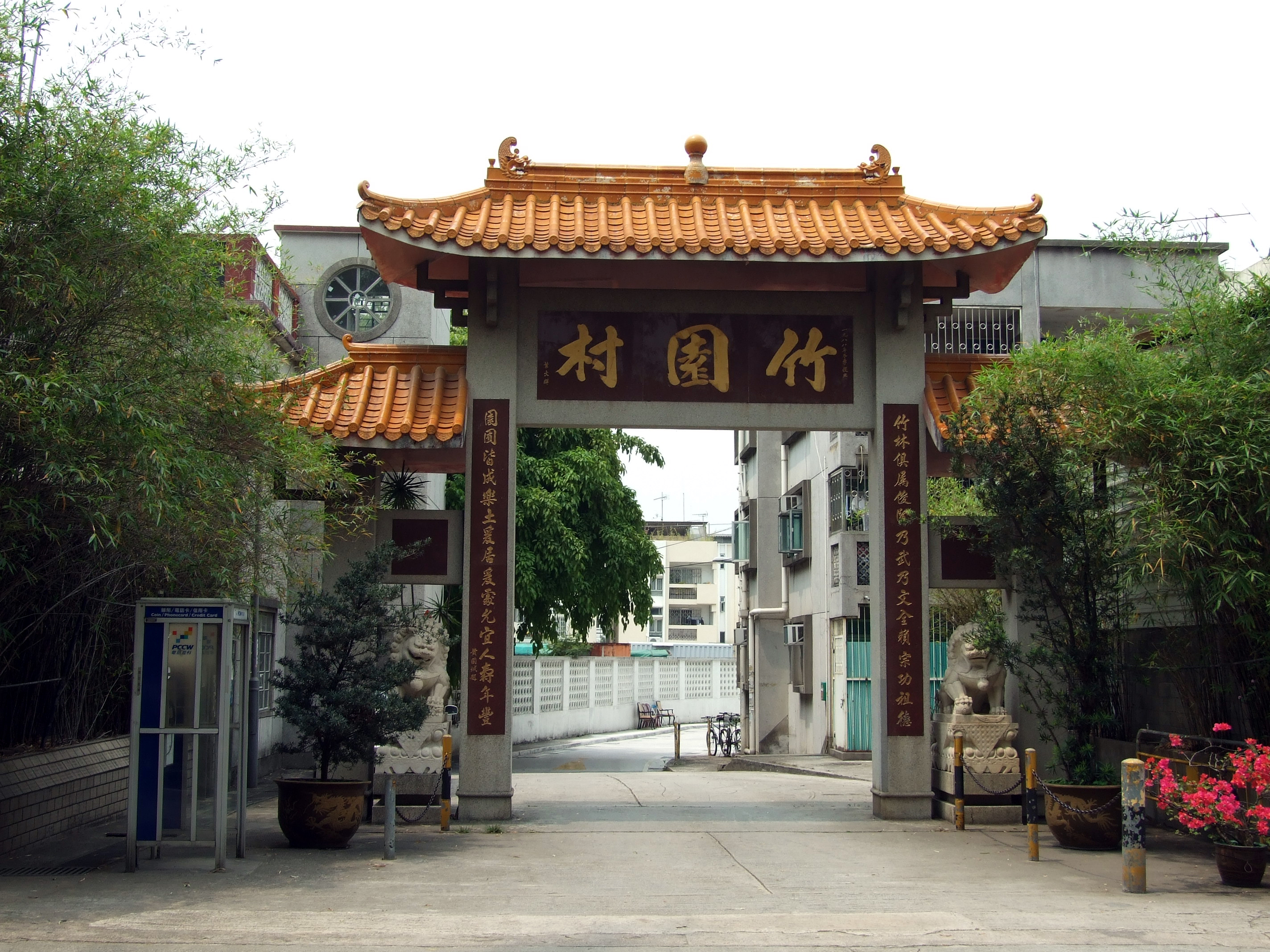
Paifang of Chuk Yuen Tsuen.

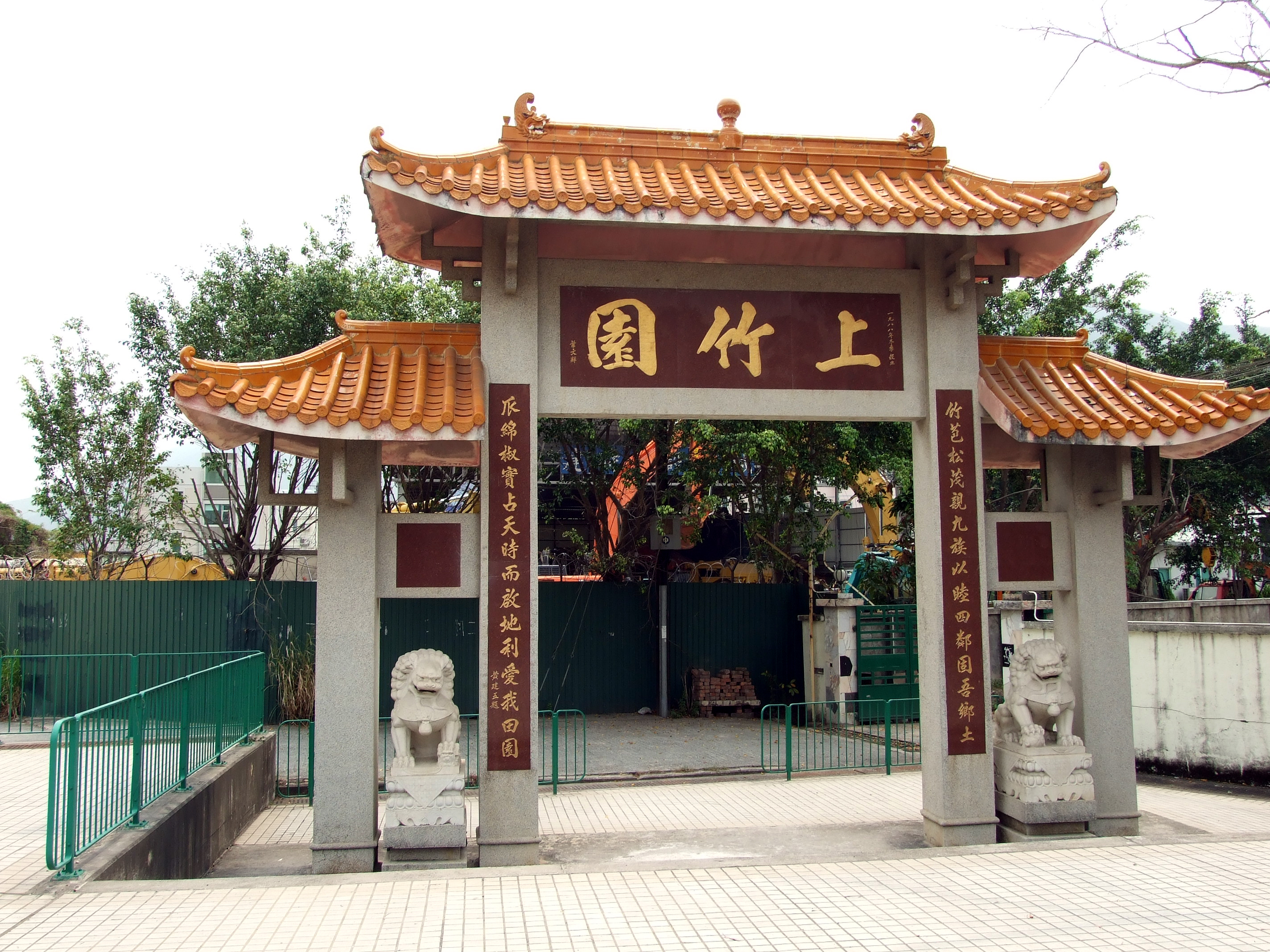
Paifang of Sheung Chuk Yuen.

Chuk Yuen (Chinese: 竹園) is a village in the San Tin area of Yuen Long District, Hong Kong.

== Administration ==
Sheung Chuk Yuen (上竹園; 'Upper Chuk Yuen') and Ha Chuk Yuen (下竹園; 'Lower Chuk Yuen'), part of Chuk Yuen, are recognized villages under the New Territories Small House Policy.
