= Tsing Lung Tsuen =

Coordinates: 22.497048°N 114.073581°E

Tsing Lung Tsuen (Chinese: 青龍村), also transliterated as Ching Loong Tsuen, is a village in the San Tin area of Yuen Long District, Hong Kong.

== Administration ==
Ching Loong Tsuen is a recognized village under the New Territories Small House Policy.
