= O Tau =

Coordinates: 22.401018°N 114.280482°E

O Tau (Chinese: 澳頭) is a village in Sai Kung District, Hong Kong.

== Administration ==
O Tau is a recognized village under the New Territories Small House Policy.
