= Cheung Uk Tei =

Village in Tai Po District, Hong Kong

Coordinates: 22.435216°N 114.16145°E

Cheung Uk Tei (Chinese: 張屋地) is a village in Tai Po District, Hong Kong.

== Administration ==
Cheung Uk Tei is a recognized village under the New Territories Small House Policy. It is one of the villages represented within the Tai Po Rural Committee. For electoral purposes, Cheung Uk Tei is part of the Tai Po Kau constituency, which is currently represented by Patrick Mo Ka-chun.
