= Muk Min Tau =

Coordinates: 22.54409°N 114.216514°E

Muk Min Tau (Chinese: 木棉頭) is a village in the Sha Tau Kok area of North District of Hong Kong.

== Administration ==
Muk Min Tau is a recognized village under the New Territories Small House Policy. It is one of the villages represented within the Sha Tau Kok District Rural Committee. For electoral purposes, Muk Min Tau is part of the Sha Ta constituency, which is currently represented by Ko Wai-kei.
