= Lin Tong Mei =

Village in Sheung Shui, Hong Kong

Coordinates: 22.482195°N 114.110568°E

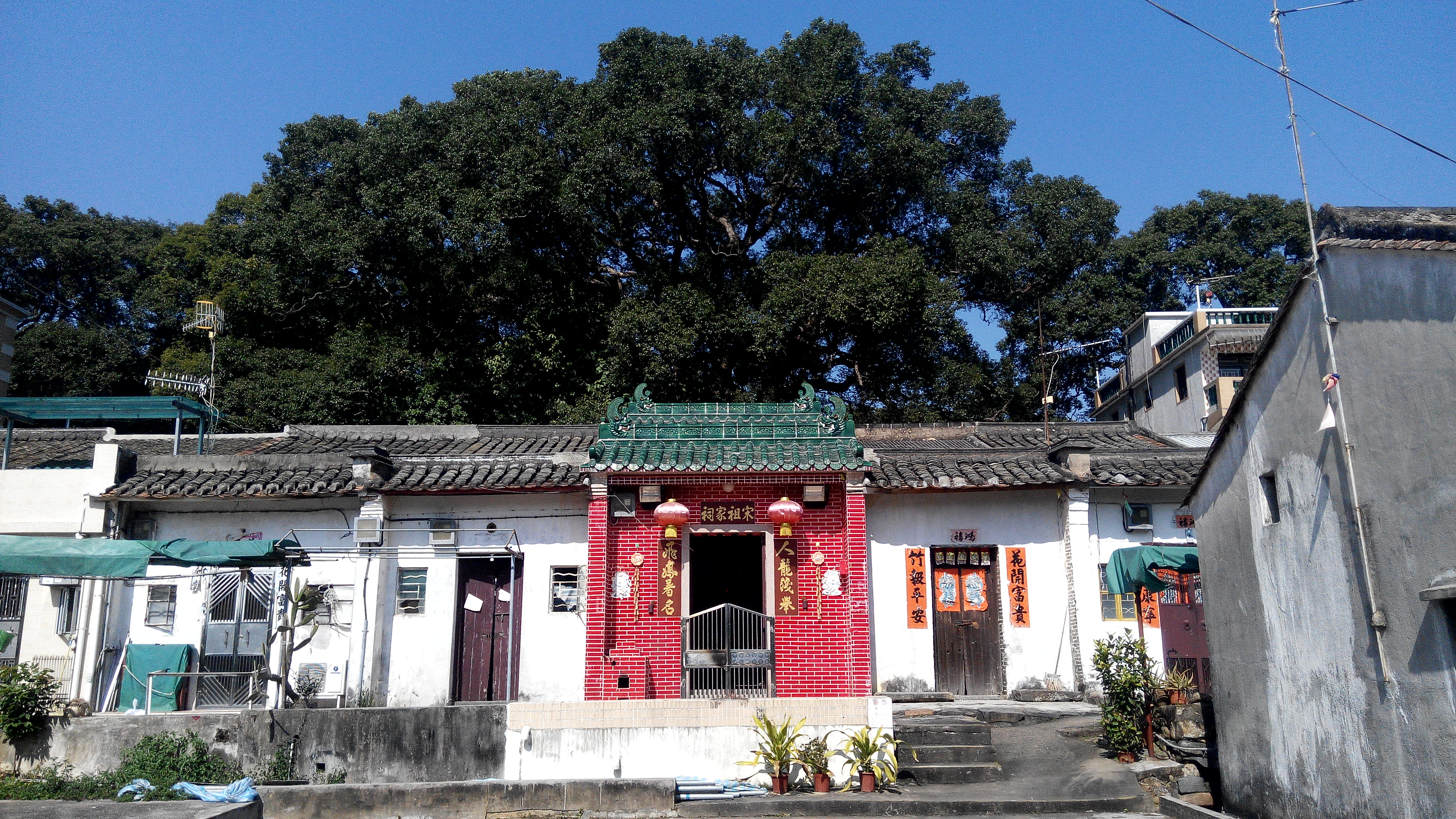
Sung Ancestral Hall in Lin Tong Mei.

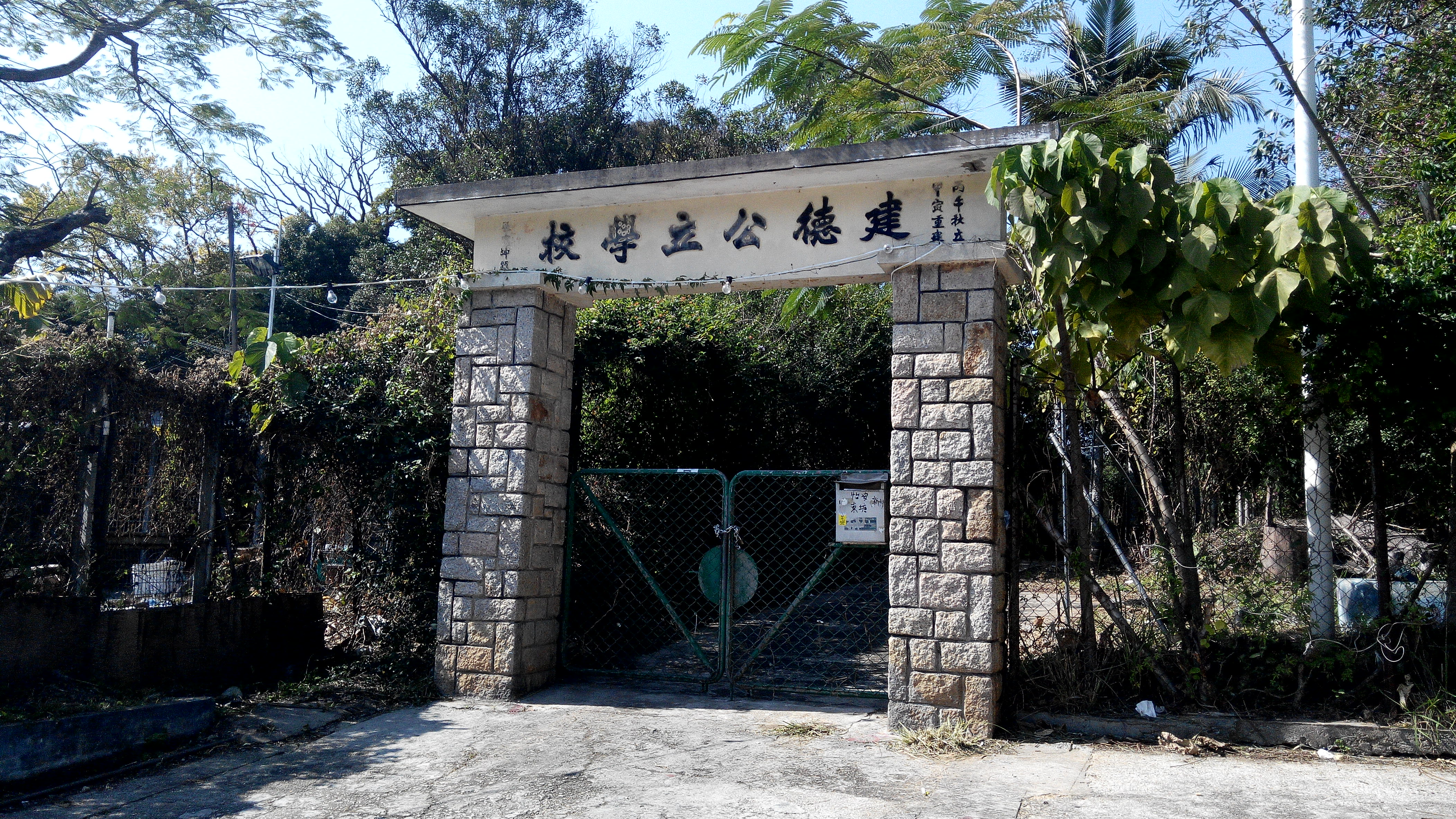
Kin Tak Public School in Lin Tong Mei.

Lin Tong Mei (Chinese: 蓮塘尾) is a village in Sheung Shui, North District, Hong Kong.

== Administration ==
Lin Tong Mei is a recognized village under the New Territories Small House Policy. It is one of the villages represented within the Sheung Shui District Rural Committee. For electoral purposes, Lin Tong Mei is part of the Sheung Shui Rural constituency, which is currently represented by Simon Hau Fuk-tat.
