= Kai Leng =

Village in Sheung Shui, Hong Kong

Coordinates: 22.493964°N 114.129764°E

Kai Leng (Chinese: 雞嶺) is a village in Sheung Shui, North District, Hong Kong.

== Administration ==
Kai Leng is a recognized village under the New Territories Small House Policy.
