= Shek Hang =

Coordinates: 22.407966°N 114.295921°E

Shek Hang (Chinese: 石坑) is a village in Sai Kung District, Hong Kong.

== Administration ==
Shek Hang is a recognized village under the New Territories Small House Policy.
