= Kong Tau Tsuen =

Village in Hong Kong

Coordinates: 22.433852°N 114.036273°E

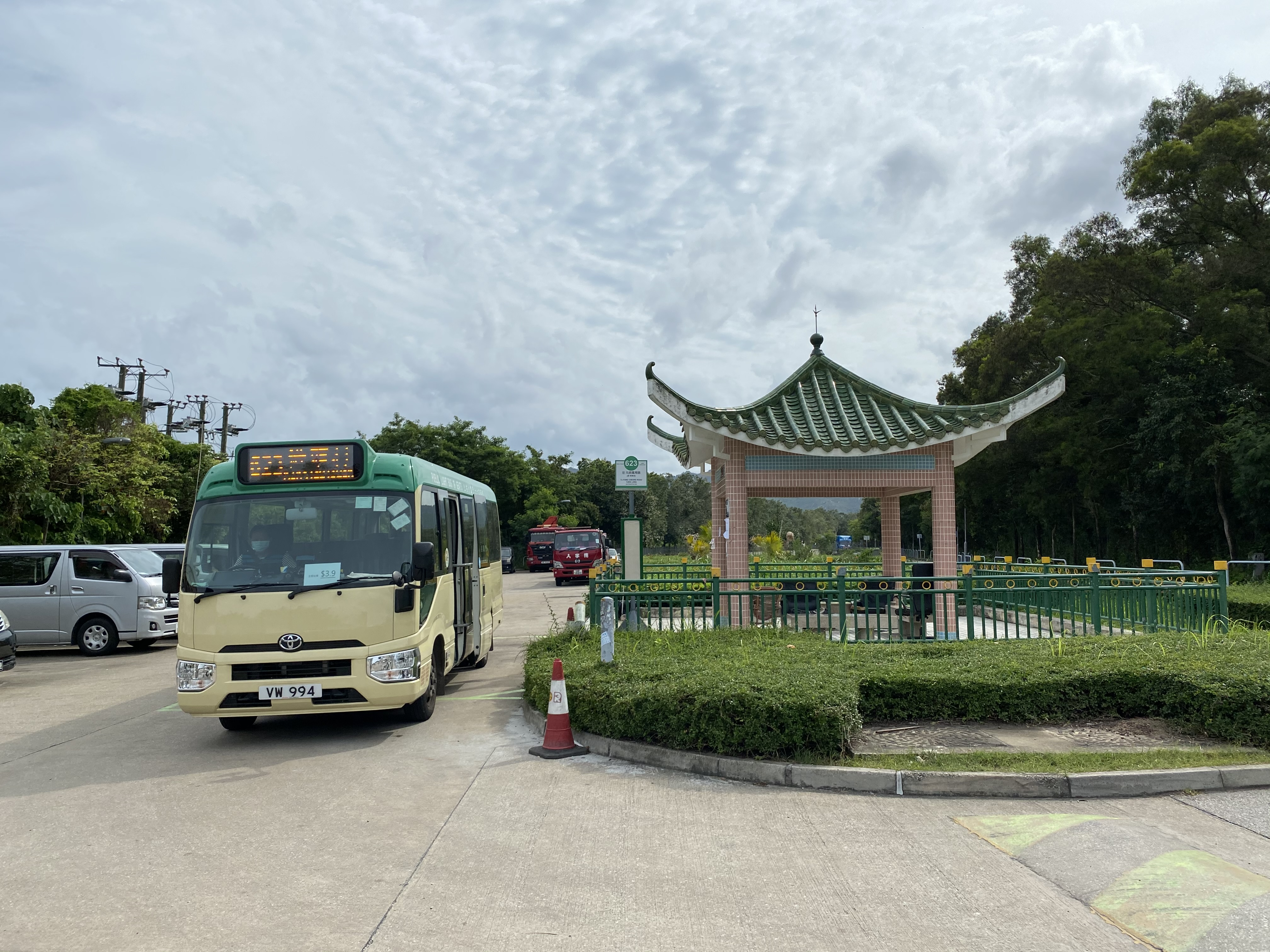
Kong Tau Tsuen terminus.

Kong Tau Tsuen (Chinese: 港頭村) is a village in the Shap Pat Heung area of Yuen Long District, Hong Kong.

== Administration ==
Kong Tau Tsuen and Kong Tau San Tsuen (港頭新村; 'Kong Tau New Village') are recognized villages under the New Territories Small House Policy.

== History ==
At the time of the 1911 census, the population of Kong Tau was 46. The number of males was 26.
