= Ko Long =

Coordinates: 22.22352°N 114.113101°E

Ko Long (Chinese: 高塱) is a village located in the area of Yung Shue Wan on the North side of Lamma Island, the third largest island in the territory of Hong Kong.

== Administration ==
Ko Long is a recognized village under the New Territories Small House Policy.
