= Tai Yuen =

Coordinates: 22.224289°N 114.113941°E

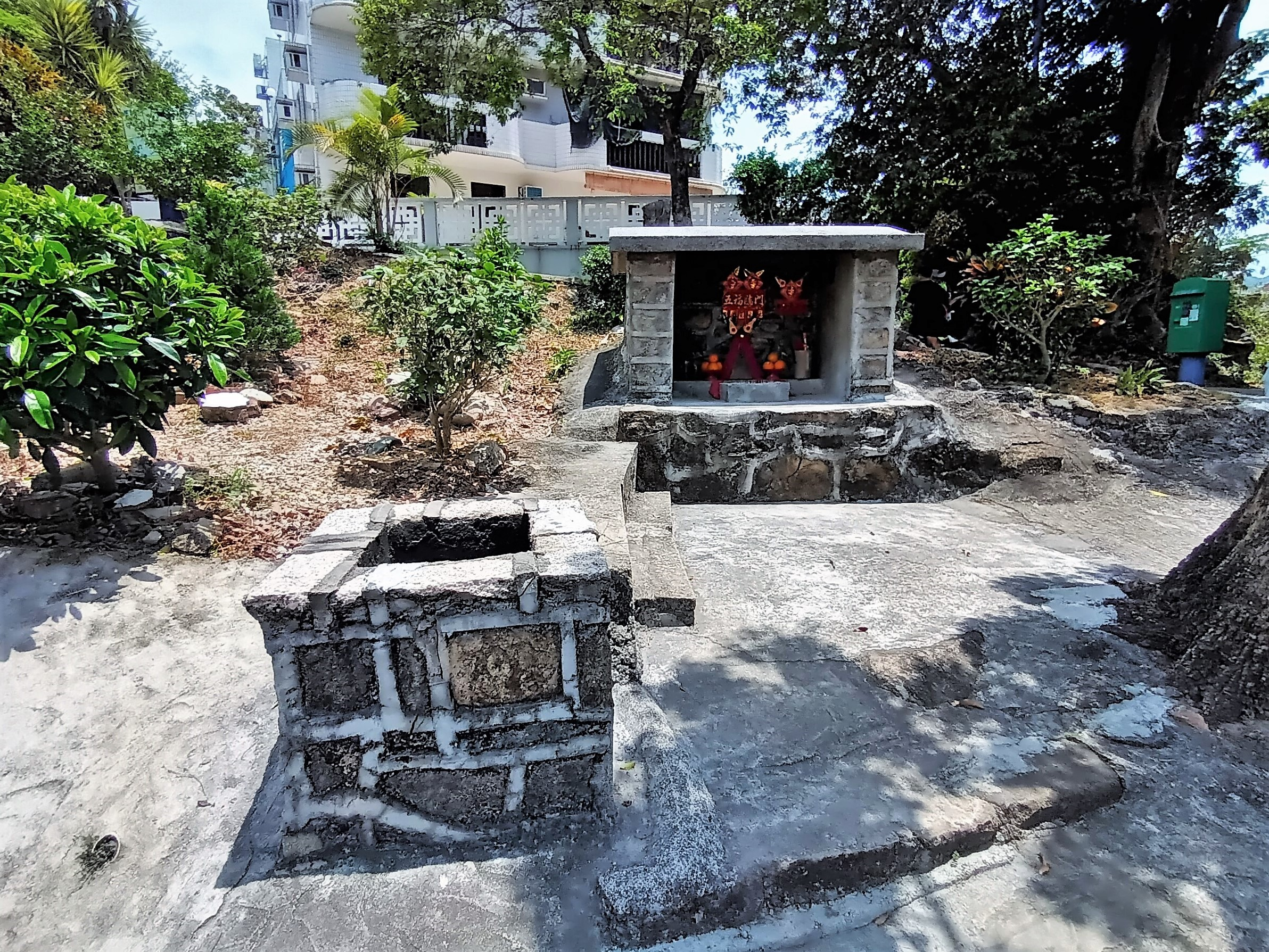
Shrine in Tai Yuen.

Tai Yuen (Chinese: 大園) is a village located in the area of Yung Shue Wan on the North side of Lamma Island, the third largest island in the territory of Hong Kong.

== Administration ==
Tai Yuen is a recognized village under the New Territories Small House Policy.
