= Lai Tau Shek =

Coordinates: 22.5104917°N 114.2677647°E

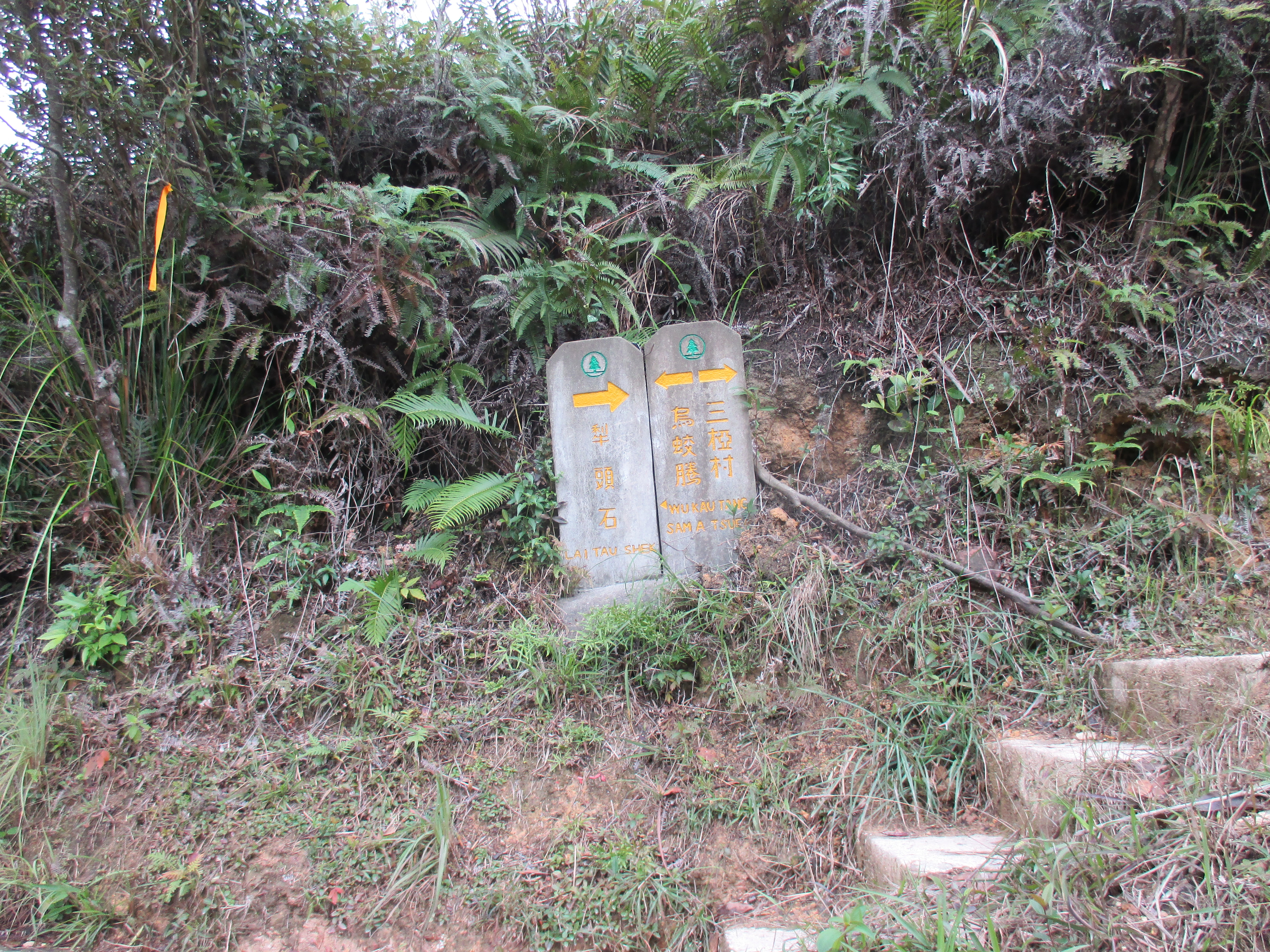
Hiking post near Kau Tam Tso indicating the way to Lai Tau Shek.

Lai Tau Shek (Chinese: 犁頭石) is a village in the North District, in the northwestern New Territories of Hong Kong.

== Administration ==
Lai Tau Shek is a recognized village under the New Territories Small House Policy.

== History ==
The village houses were abandoned in mid-1970s. Today, Lai Tau Shek Village is hidden in a dense forest and only tumbled building blocks remain.

== See also ==
- Lai Chi Wo
