= Long Keng =

Village in Hong Kong

Coordinates: 22.399204°N 114.282286°E

Long Keng (Chinese: 浪徑) is a village in Sai Kung District, Hong Kong.

== Administration ==
Long Keng is a recognized village under the New Territories Small House Policy.
