= Tsat Muk Kiu =

Coordinates: 22.5073931°N 114.2163134°E

Tsat Muk Kiu (Chinese: 七木橋) is a village in the North District, in the northwestern New Territories of Hong Kong. The village consists of Sheung Tsat Muk Kiu (上七木橋; 'Upper Tsat Muk Kiu') and Ha Tsat Muk Kiu (下七木橋; 'Lower Tsat Muk Kiu').

== Administration ==
Tsat Muk Kiu is a recognized village under the New Territories Small House Policy.

== History ==
At the time of the 1911 census, the population of Ha Tsat Muk Kiu was 76. The number of males was 27.
