= Yung Shue Au =

Coordinates: 22.5438°N 114.2479°E

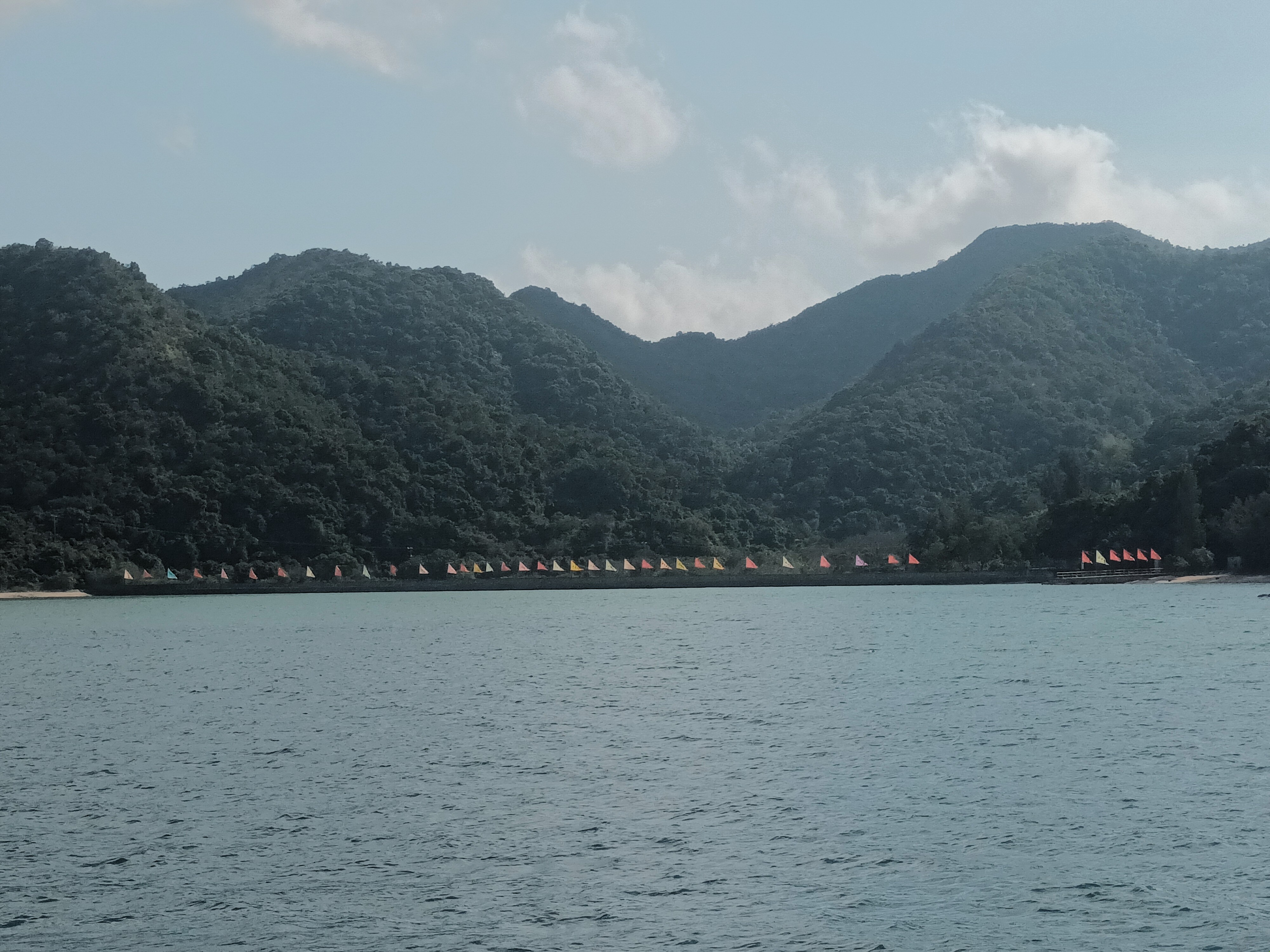
View of Yung Shue Au Wan from the sea

Yung Shue Au (Chinese: 榕樹凹) is a Hakka village and the name of the surrounding area located in northeast the New Territories, Hong Kong. Administratively, it falls within the North District.

== Administration ==
Yung Shue Au is a recognized village under the New Territories Small House Policy.

== Geography ==
The location of Yung Shue Au is adjacent to Starling Inlet and close to the maritime border between Hong Kong and Shenzhen.

Yung Shue Au means 'banyan pass', a mountain pass next to the north bay of Yung Shue Au Wan (榕樹凹灣; 'Yung Shue Au Bay') on the peninsula northeast of Pat Sin Leng.

== History ==
The village was founded by a person named WAN Mein Cheong who came from Huizhou.
