= Pun Shan Chau =

Coordinates: 22.431479°N 114.169305°E

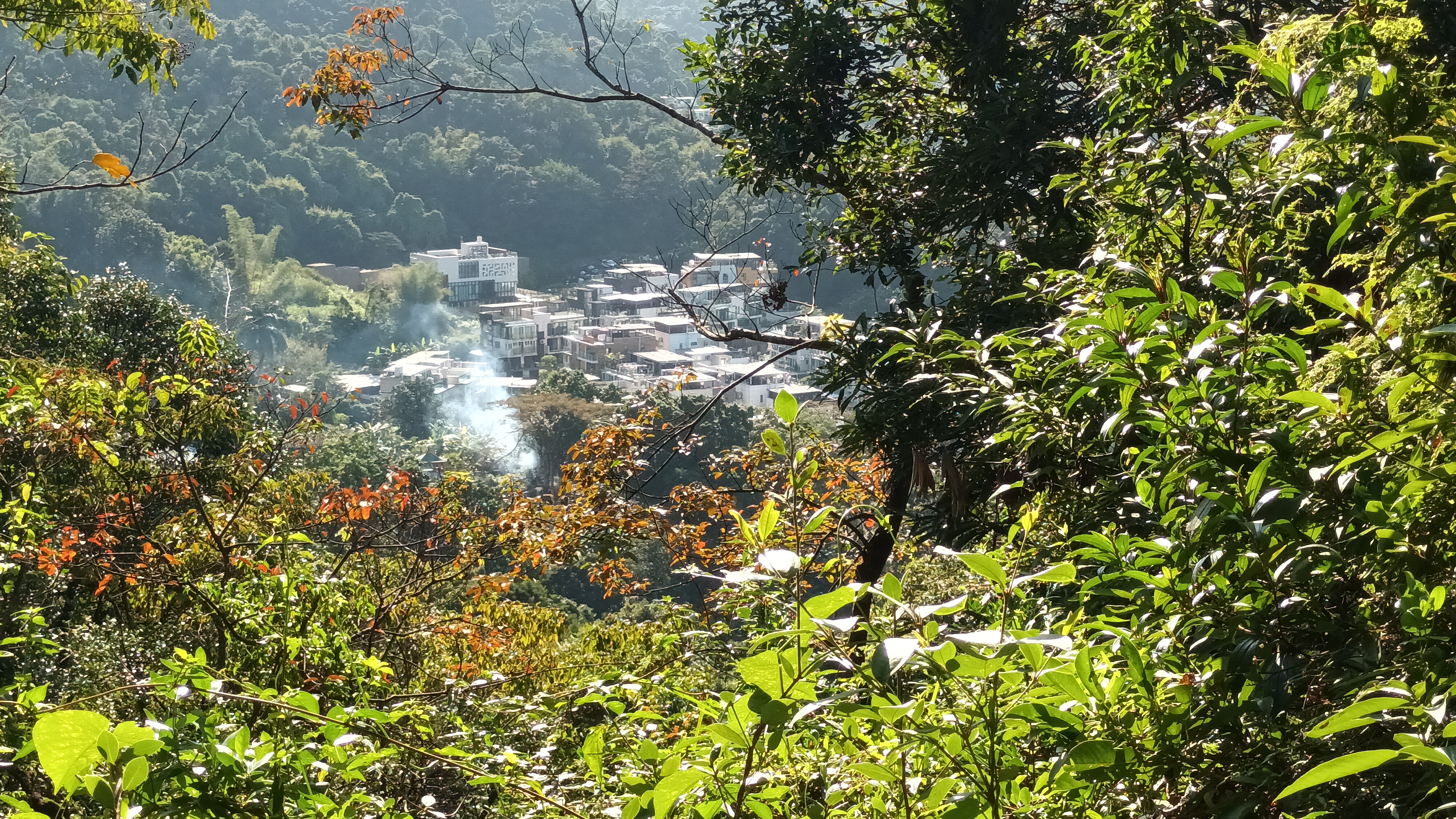
View of Pun Shan Chau.

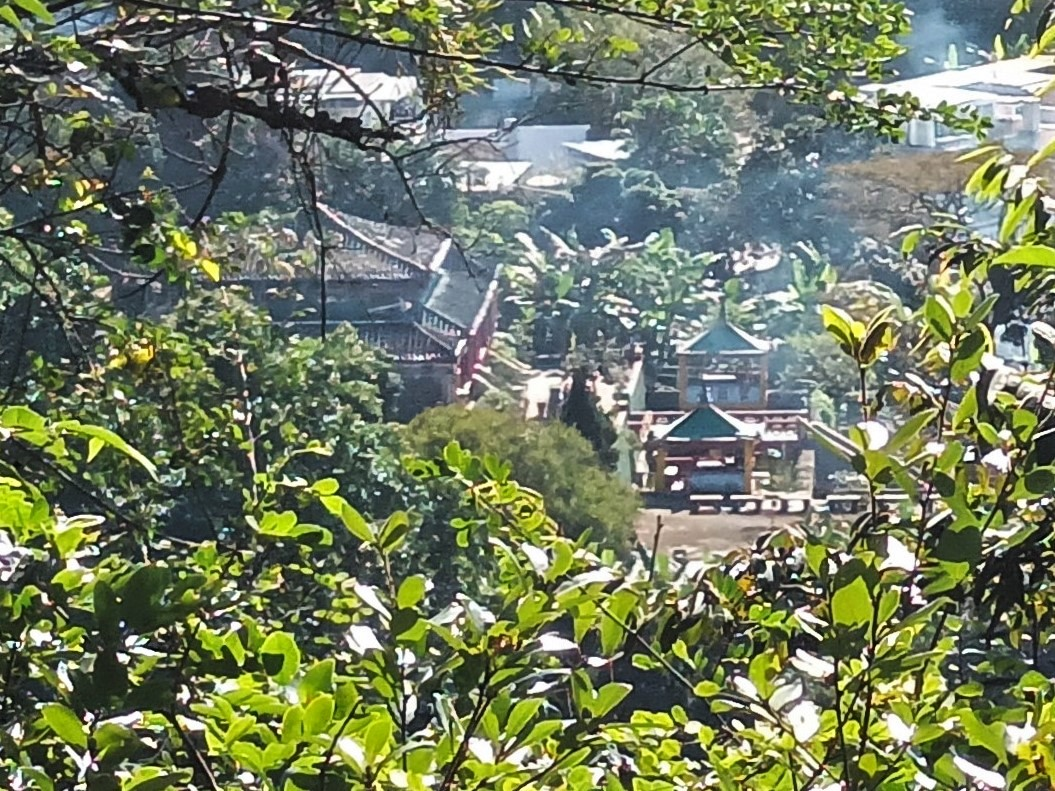
Fung Loi Leung Yuen (蓬萊閬苑), a Taoist temple in Pun Shan Chau.

Pun Shan Chau (Chinese: 半山洲) is a village in Tai Po District, Hong Kong.

== Administration ==
Pun Shan Chau is a recognized village under the New Territories Small House Policy.
