= Tit Kim Hang =

Village in Sai Kung, Hong Kong

Coordinates: 22.404731°N 114.301427°E

Tit Kim Hang (Chinese: 鐵鉗坑) is a village in Sai Kung District, Hong Kong.

== Administration ==
Tit Kim Hang is a recognized village under the New Territories Small House Policy.
