= Hing Keng Shek =

Coordinates: 22.36506°N 114.252179°E

Hing Keng Shek (Chinese: 慶徑石) is a village in Sai Kung District, Hong Kong.

== Administration ==
Hing Keng Shek, including Sam Fai Tin (三塊田), is a recognized village under the New Territories Small House Policy.
