= Ying Pun =

Coordinates: 22.474113°N 114.111091°E

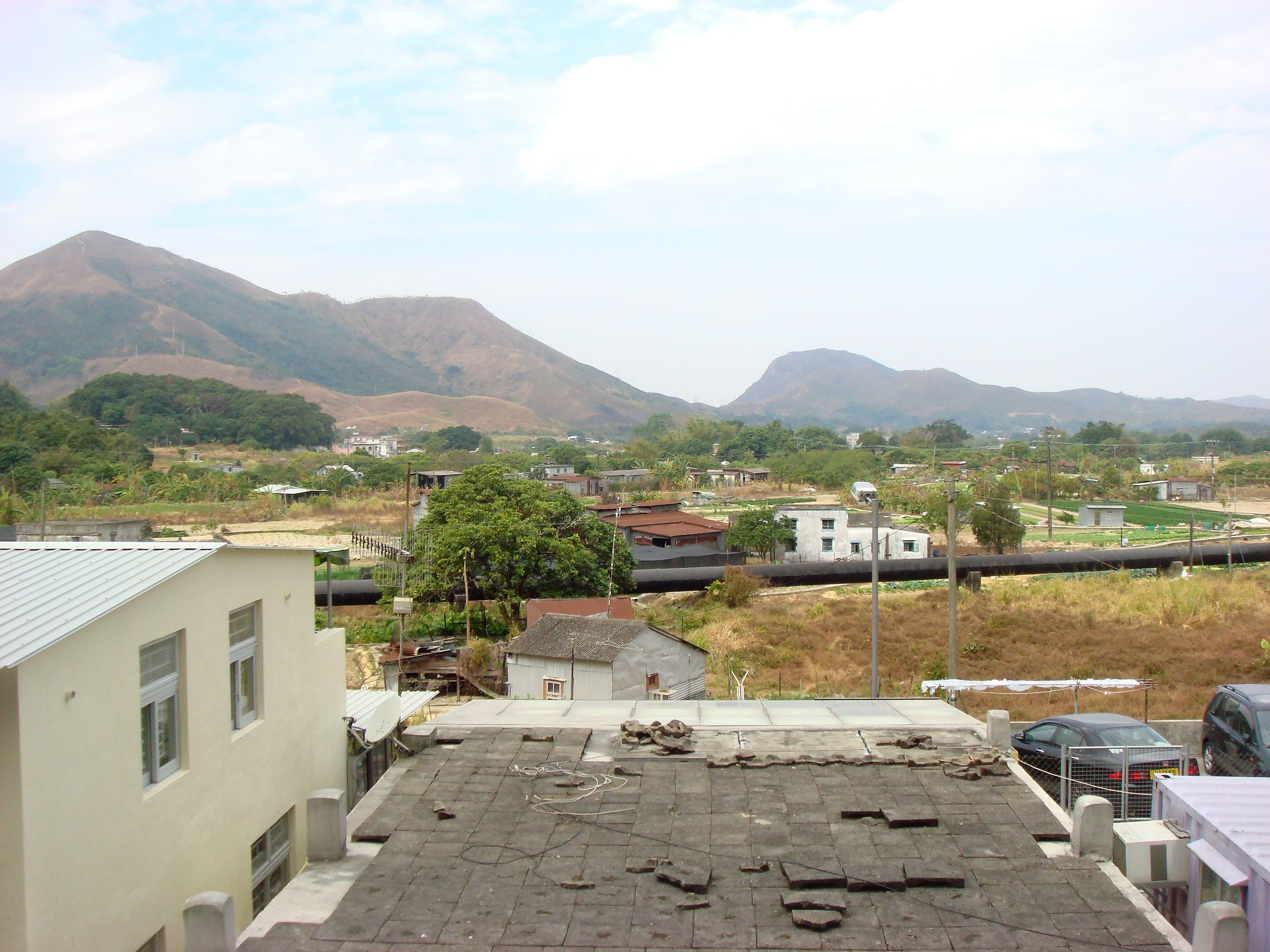
Ying Pun in North District, Hong Kong.

Ying Pun (Chinese: 營盤) is a village in Sheung Shui, North District, Hong Kong.

== Administration ==
Ying Pun is a recognized village under the New Territories Small House Policy. It is one of the villages represented within the Sheung Shui District Rural Committee. For electoral purposes, Ying Pun is part of the Sheung Shui Rural constituency, which is currently represented by Simon Hau Fuk-tat.
