= Sai Lau Kong =

Coordinates: 22.524962°N 114.285288°E

Sai Lau Kong (Chinese: 西流江) is a village in the Sha Tau Kok area of North District of Hong Kong.

== Features ==
The Sai Lau Kong Fish Culture Zone (西流江魚類養殖區), one of the 26 designated marine fish culture zones in Hong Kong, is located in Ngau Shi Wu Wan (牛屎湖灣), a bay west of Sai Lau Kong and northeast of Ngau Shi Wu.
