= Nam A =

Coordinates: 22.399151°N 114.277134°E

Nam A (Chinese: 南丫) is a village in Sai Kung District, Hong Kong.

== Administration ==
Nam A is a recognized village under the New Territories Small House Policy.
