= Uk Cheung =

Sai Kung District, Hong Kong

Coordinates: 22.381267°N 114.251431°E

Uk Cheung (Chinese: 屋場) is a village in Sai Kung District, Hong Kong.

== Administration ==
Uk Cheung is a recognized village under the New Territories Small House Policy.

== History ==
At the time of the 1911 census, the population of Uk Cheung was 6. The number of males was 4.
