= Wong Keng Tsai =

Village in Sai Kung, Hong Kong

Coordinates: 22.343118°N 114.23374°E

Wong Keng Tsai (Chinese: 黃麖仔) is a village in Sai Kung District, Hong Kong.

== Administration ==
Wong Keng Tsai is a recognized village under the New Territories Small House Policy.
