= Ping Shan Chai =

Village in Tai Po, Hong Kong

Coordinates: 22.486005°N 114.188361°E

Ping Shan Chai (Chinese: 平山仔) is a village in Tai Po District, Hong Kong.

== Administration ==
Ping Shan Chai is a recognized village under the New Territories Small House Policy.
