= San Lung Tsuen =

Coordinates: 22.498234°N 114.073298°E

San Lung Tsuen (Chinese: 新龍村), also transliterated as San Loong Tsuen, is a village in the San Tin area of Yuen Long District, Hong Kong.

== Administration ==
San Loong Tsuen is a recognized village under the New Territories Small House Policy.
