= Sha Ha =

Coordinates: 22.388988°N 114.275549°E

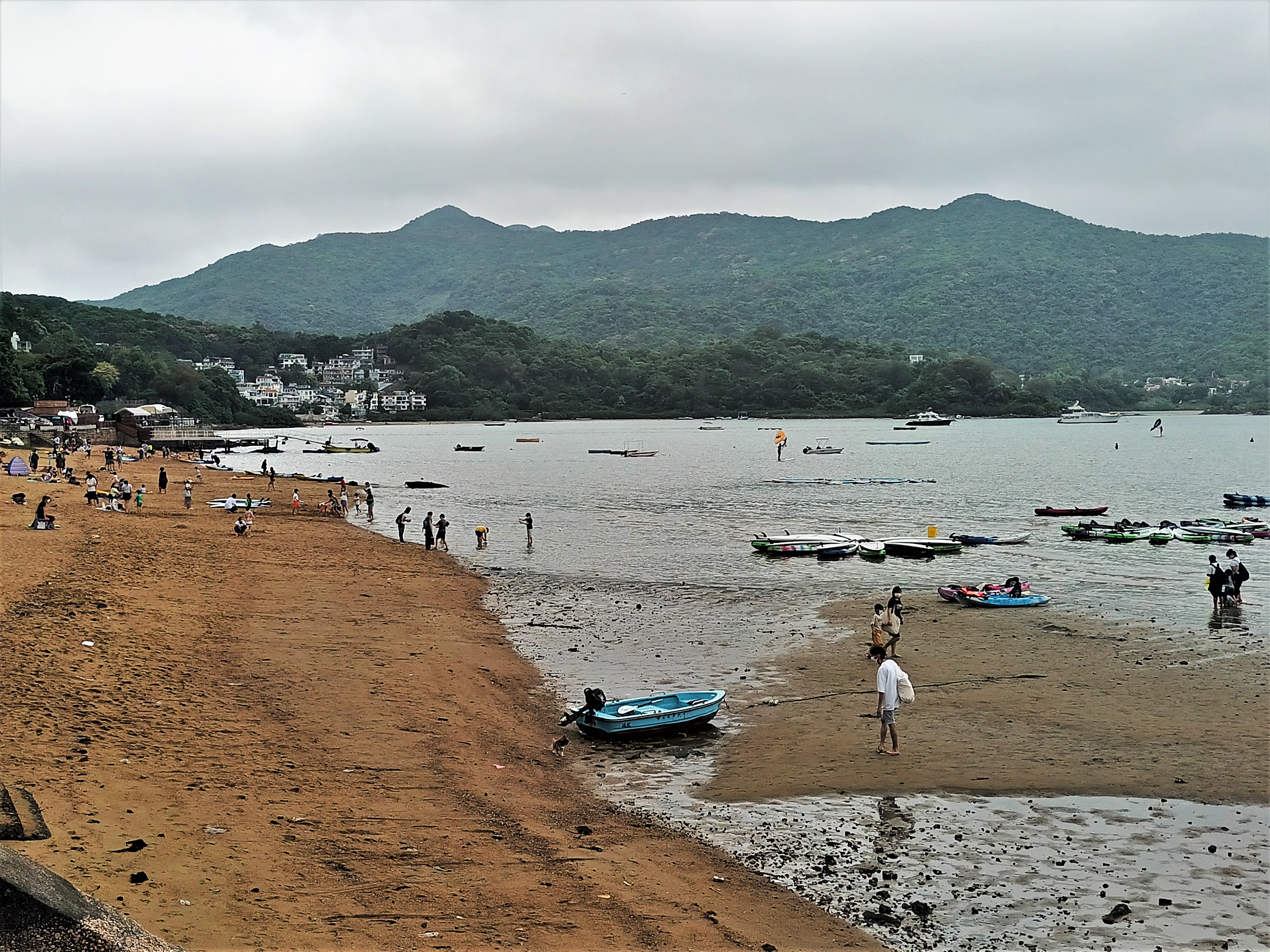
Sha Ha Beach (沙下灘).

Sha Ha (Chinese: 沙下) is a village in Sai Kung District, Hong Kong.

== Administration ==
Sha Ha is a recognized village under the New Territories Small House Policy.
