= Lung Mei, Sai Kung District =

Village in Hong Kong, China

Coordinates: 22.393785°N 114.269061°E

Lung Mei (Chinese: 龍尾) is a village in Sai Kung District, Hong Kong.

== Administration ==
Lung Mei is a recognized village under the New Territories Small House Policy.
