= Nam Hang, Tai Po District =

Village in Tai Po District, Hong Kong

Coordinates: 22.458972°N 114.169043°E

Nam Hang (Chinese: 南坑) is a village in Tai Po District, New Territories, Hong Kong.

== Administration ==
Nam Hang is a recognized village under the New Territories Small House Policy.
