= Shan Pui Tsuen =

Village in Shap Pat Heung, Yuen Long District, Hong Kong

Coordinates: 22.45271°N 114.037195°E

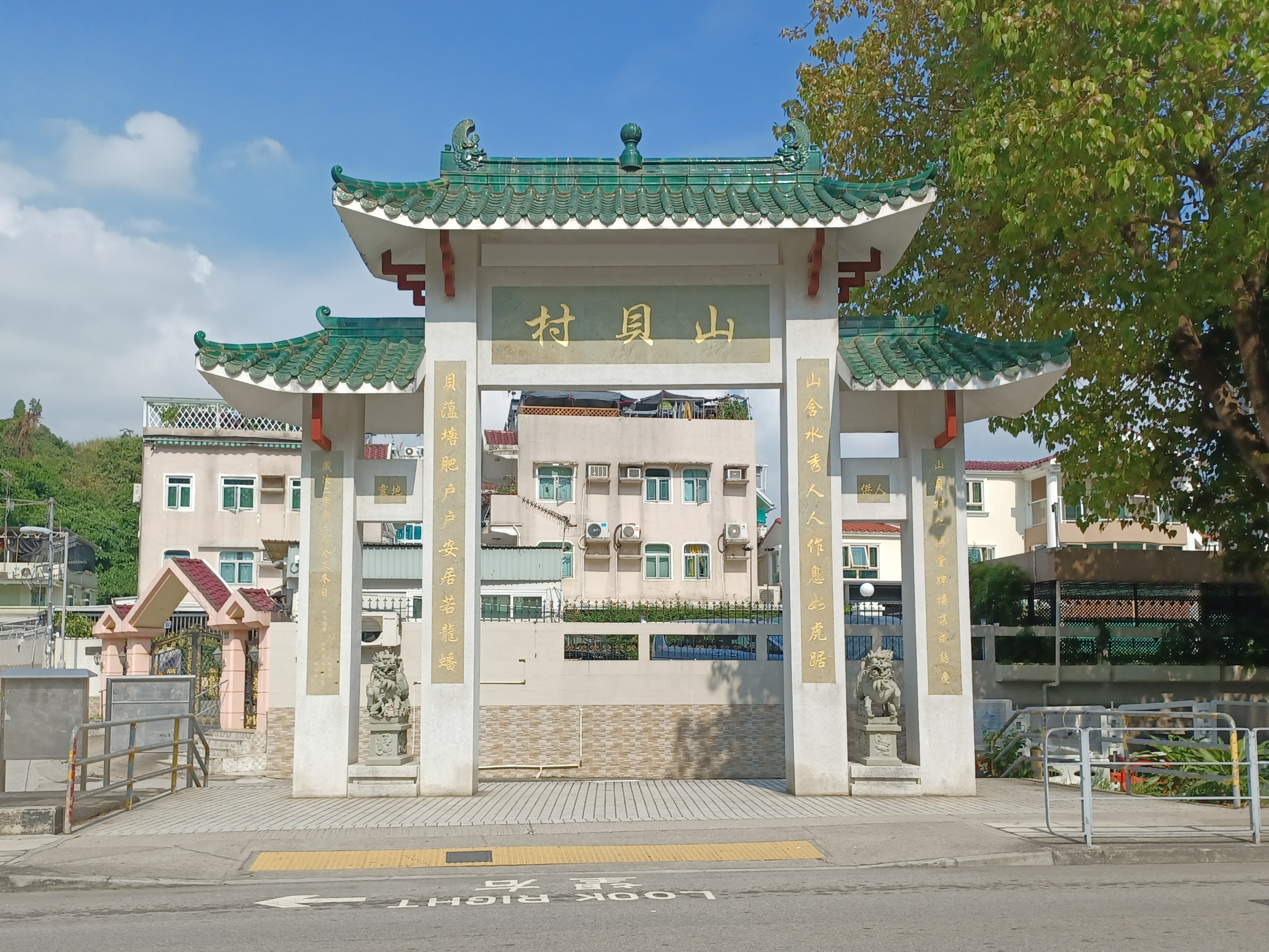
Shan Pui Tsuen Archway in April 2022

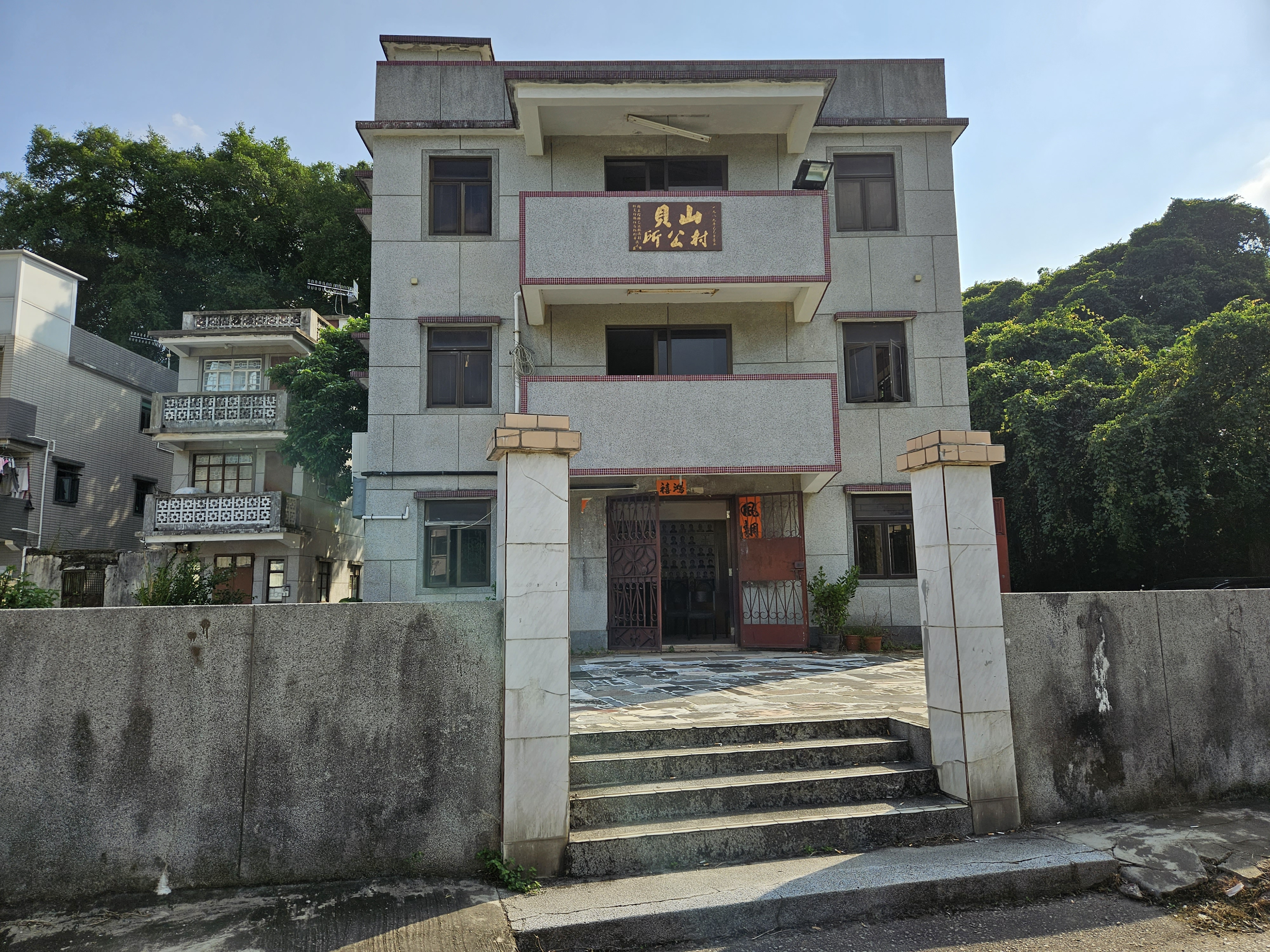
Shan Pui Village Office

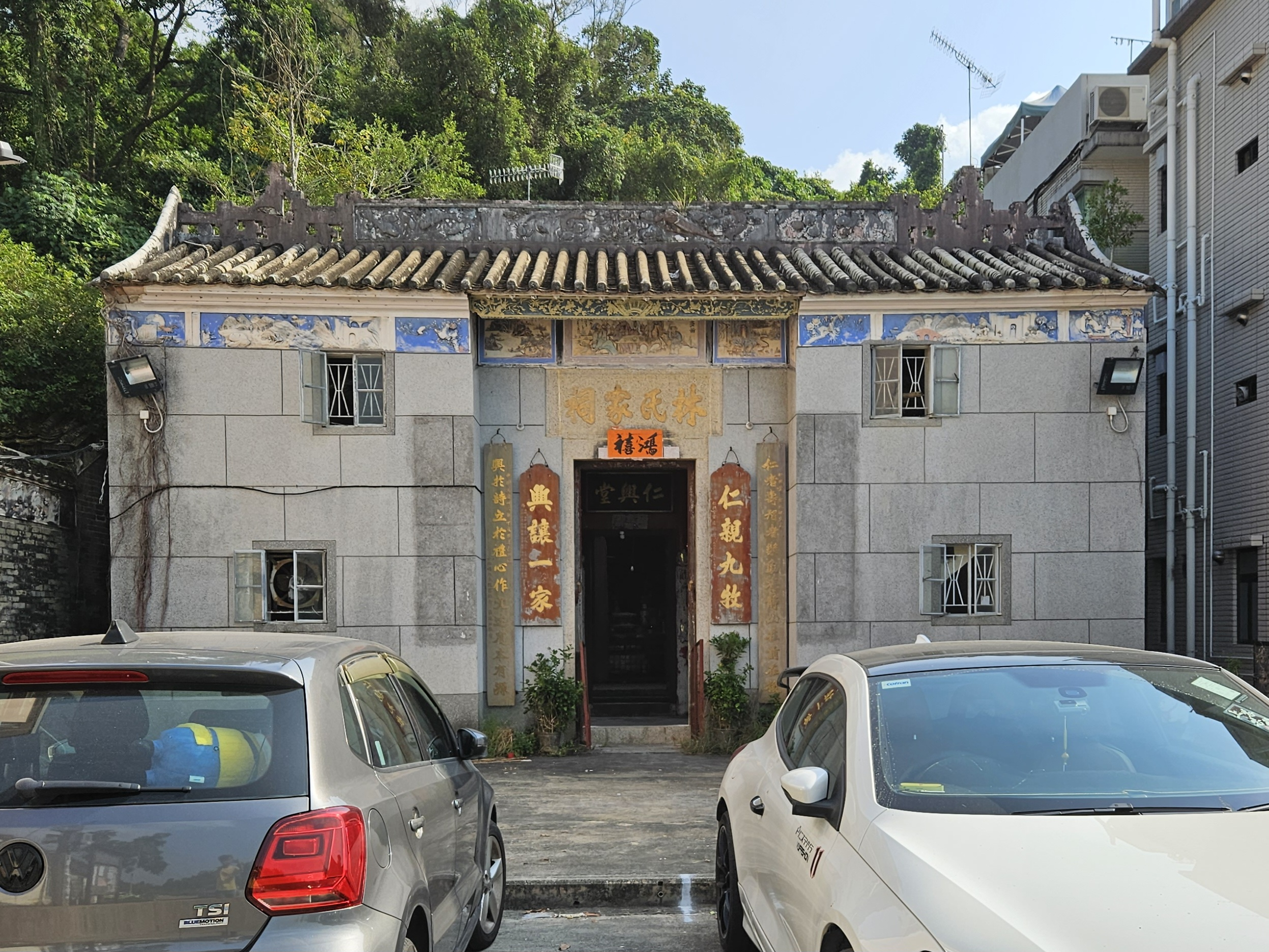
Lam Ancestral Hall, Shan Pui Tsuen

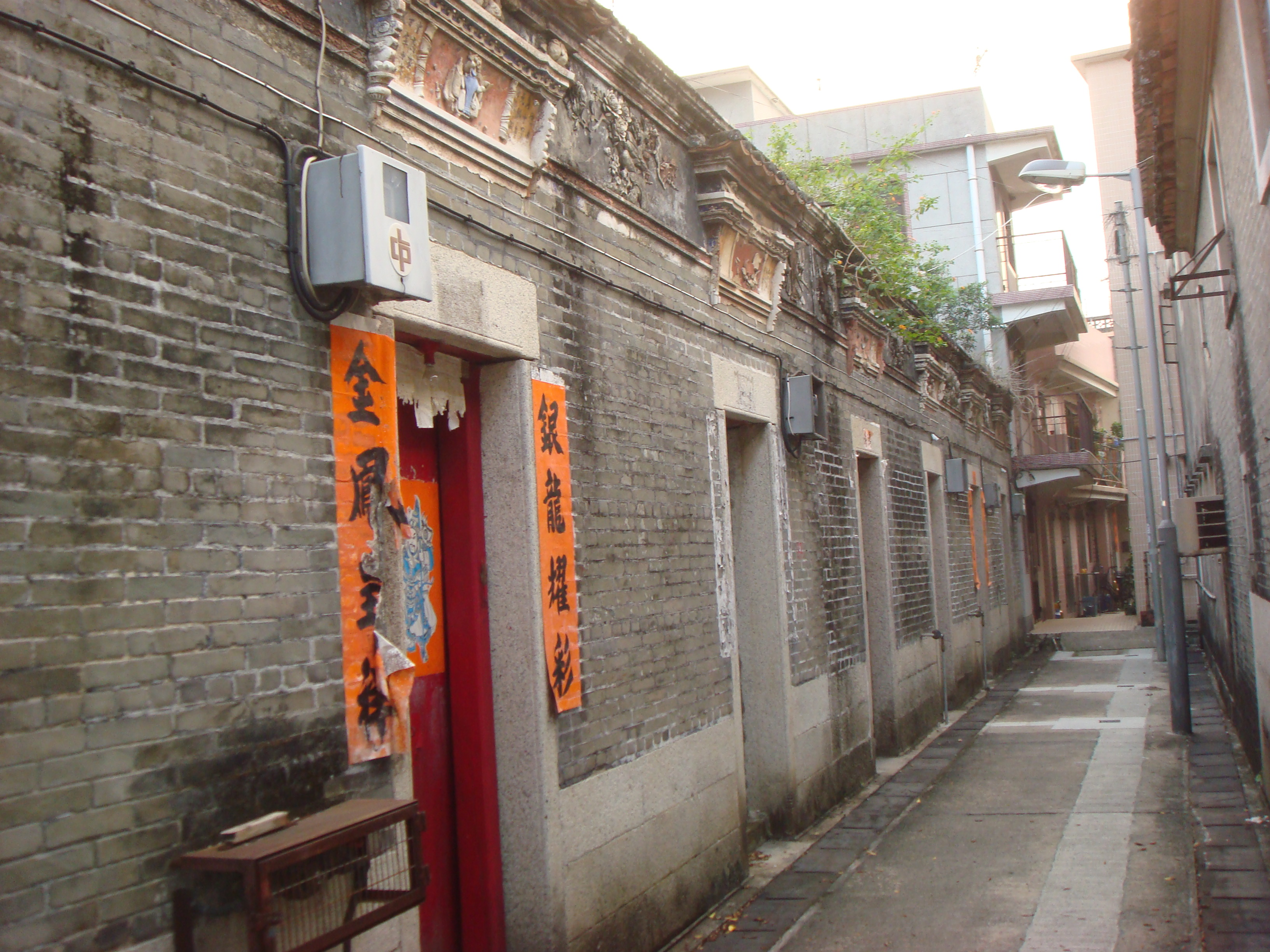
Nos. 191-197 Shan Pui Tsuen

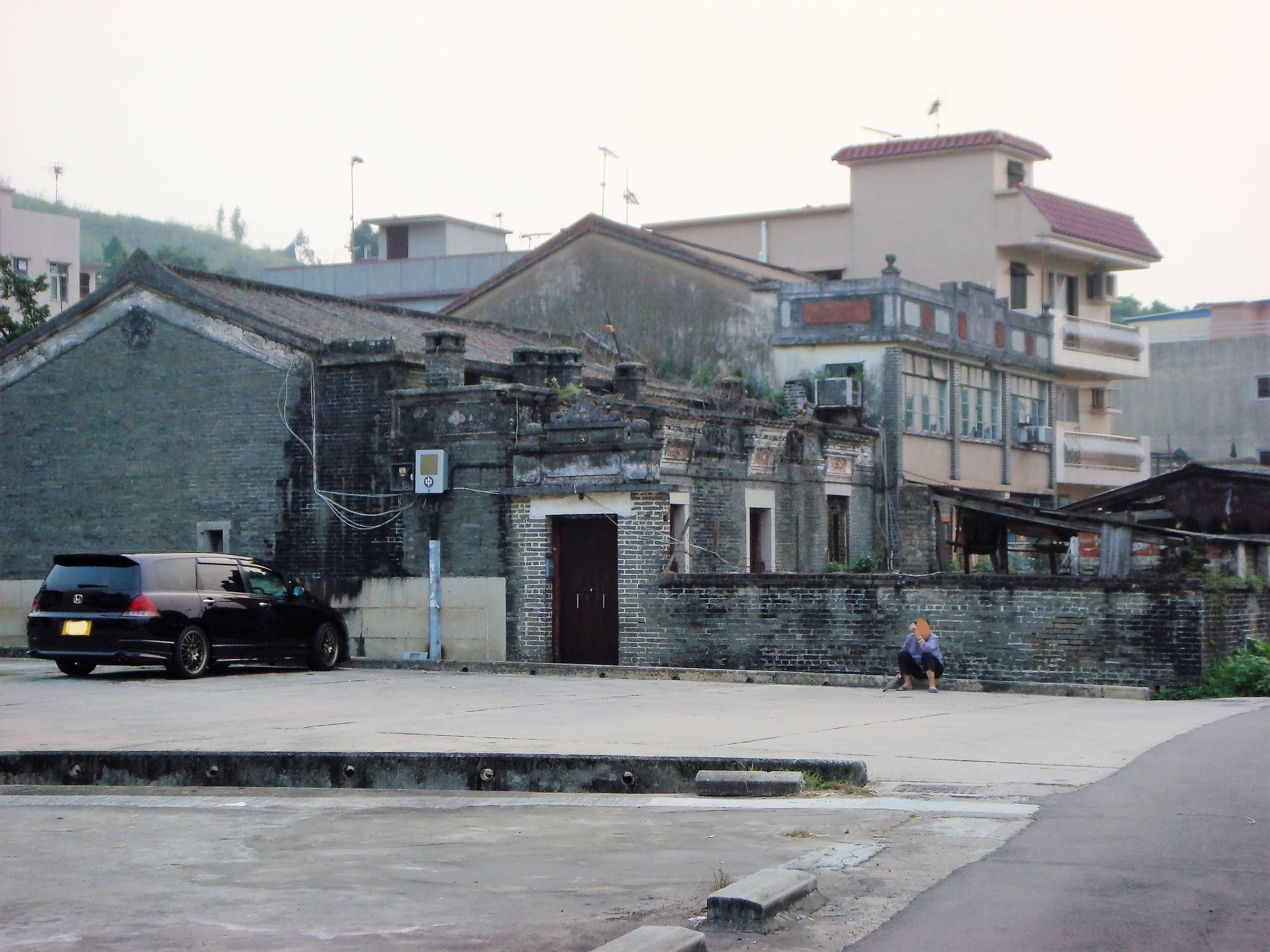
Nos. 223-226 Shan Pui Tsuen

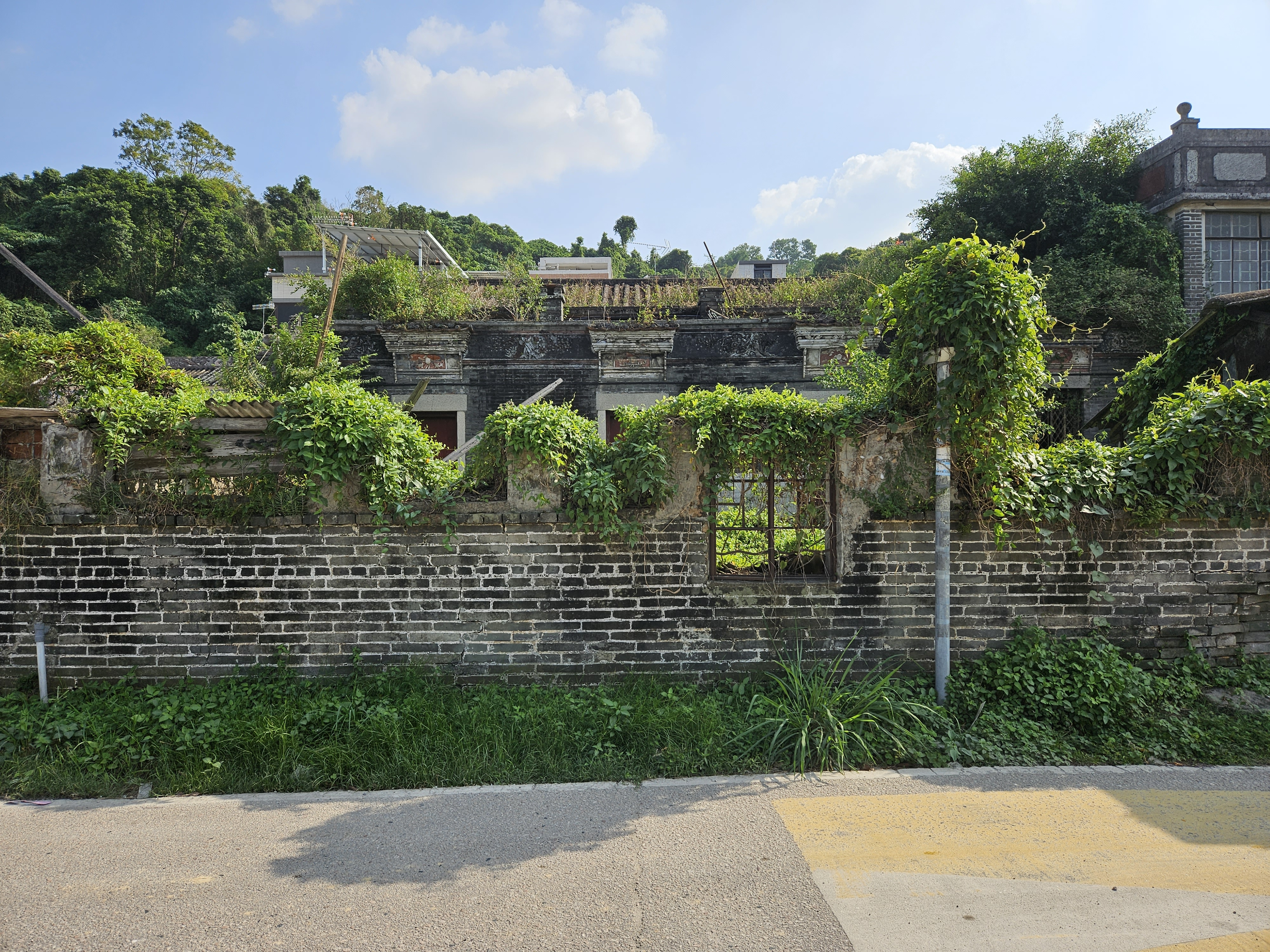
Nos. 223-226 Shan Pui Tsuen in November 2023

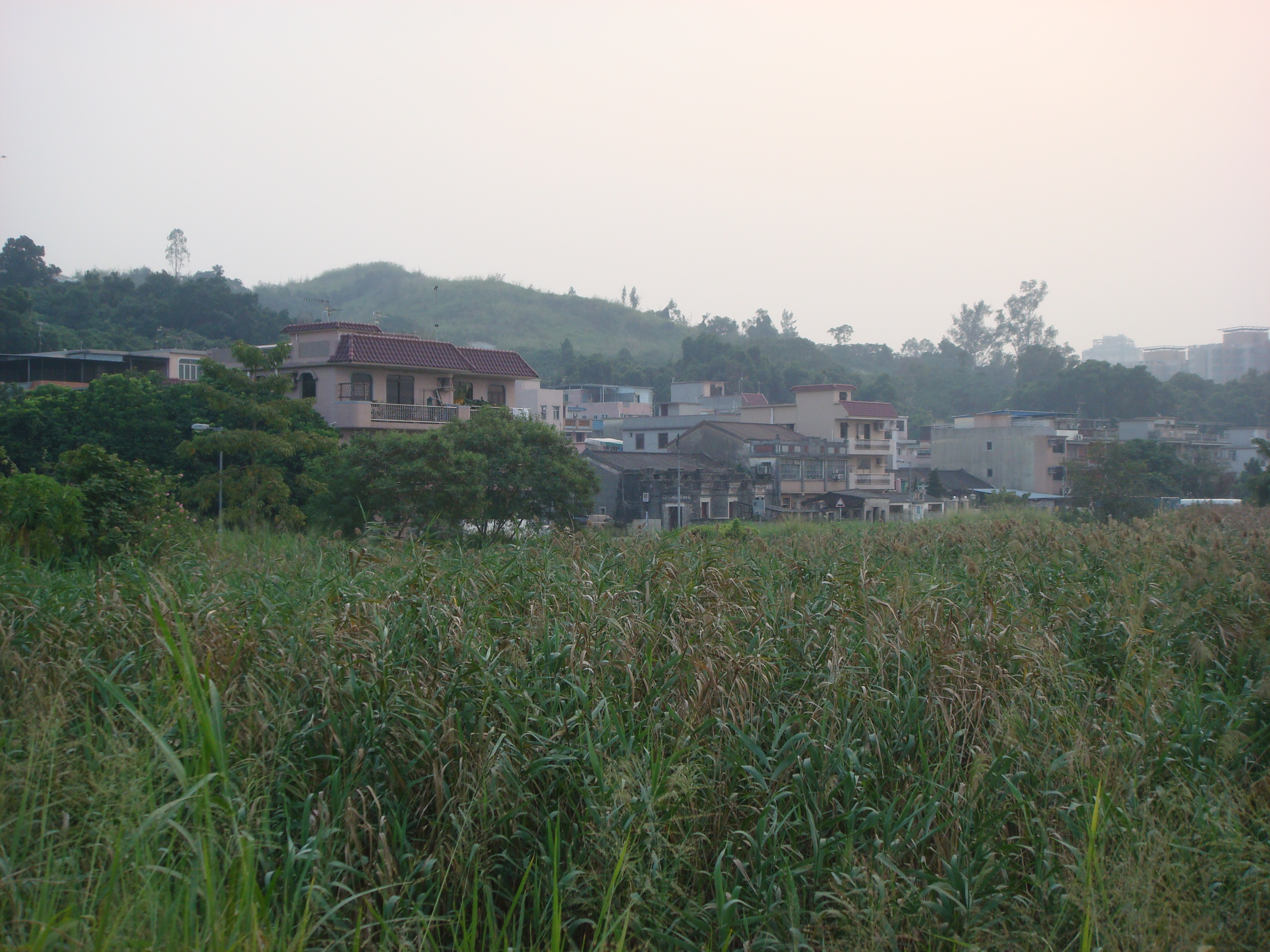
Distant view of Shan Pui Tsuen

Shan Pui Tsuen (Chinese: 山貝村) is a village in Shap Pat Heung, Yuen Long District, Hong Kong.

== Administration ==
Shan Pui Tsuen is a recognized village under the New Territories Small House Policy. For electoral purposes, Shan Pui Tsuen is located in the Shap Pat Heung North constituency of the Yuen Long District Council. It is currently represented by Shum Ho-kit, who was elected in the 2011 Yuen Long District Council Shap Pat Heung North Constituency elections.

== Geography ==
Shan Pui Tsuen is located north of a hill separating it from Yuen Long Kau Hui. A small boat near the village entrance serves as a ferry across the Kam Tin River towards Nam Sang Wai in the north.

== History ==
Shan Pui Tsuen was founded by Lam Siu-yuen (林兆元), a 13th generation member of the Lam Clan, who moved from Tai Wai Tsuen some 200 years ago. Historically, the village was facing a large piece of fishing ponds.

At the time of the 1911 census, the population of Shan Pui was 273. The number of males was 118.

Shan Pui Tsuen is part of the Tung Tau alliance (東頭約) or "Joint Meeting Group of Seven Villages", together with Nam Pin Wai, Tung Tau Tsuen, Choi Uk Tsuen, Ying Lung Wai, Wong Uk Tsuen and Tai Wai Tsuen. The Yi Shing Temple in Wong Uk Tsuen is an alliance temple of the Tung Tau Alliance.

== Features ==
Lam Ancestral Hall (林氏家祠), located at No. 157 Shan Pui Tsuen, in the eastern part of the village, was probably built in the 19th century. The building was used as the classrooms of a school for teaching village children in the 1930s-1960s, and as classrooms of a kindergarten in 1967–1968.

Several old residential houses in the village are Qing vernacular buildings and are considered to have built heritage value.

== Education ==
Shan Pui is in Primary One Admission (POA) School Net 74. Within the school net are multiple aided schools (operated independently but funded with government money) and one government school: Yuen Long Government Primary School (元朗官立小學).
