= Choi Uk Tsuen =

Village in Yuen Long, Hong Kong

Coordinates: 22.44814°N 114.03654°E

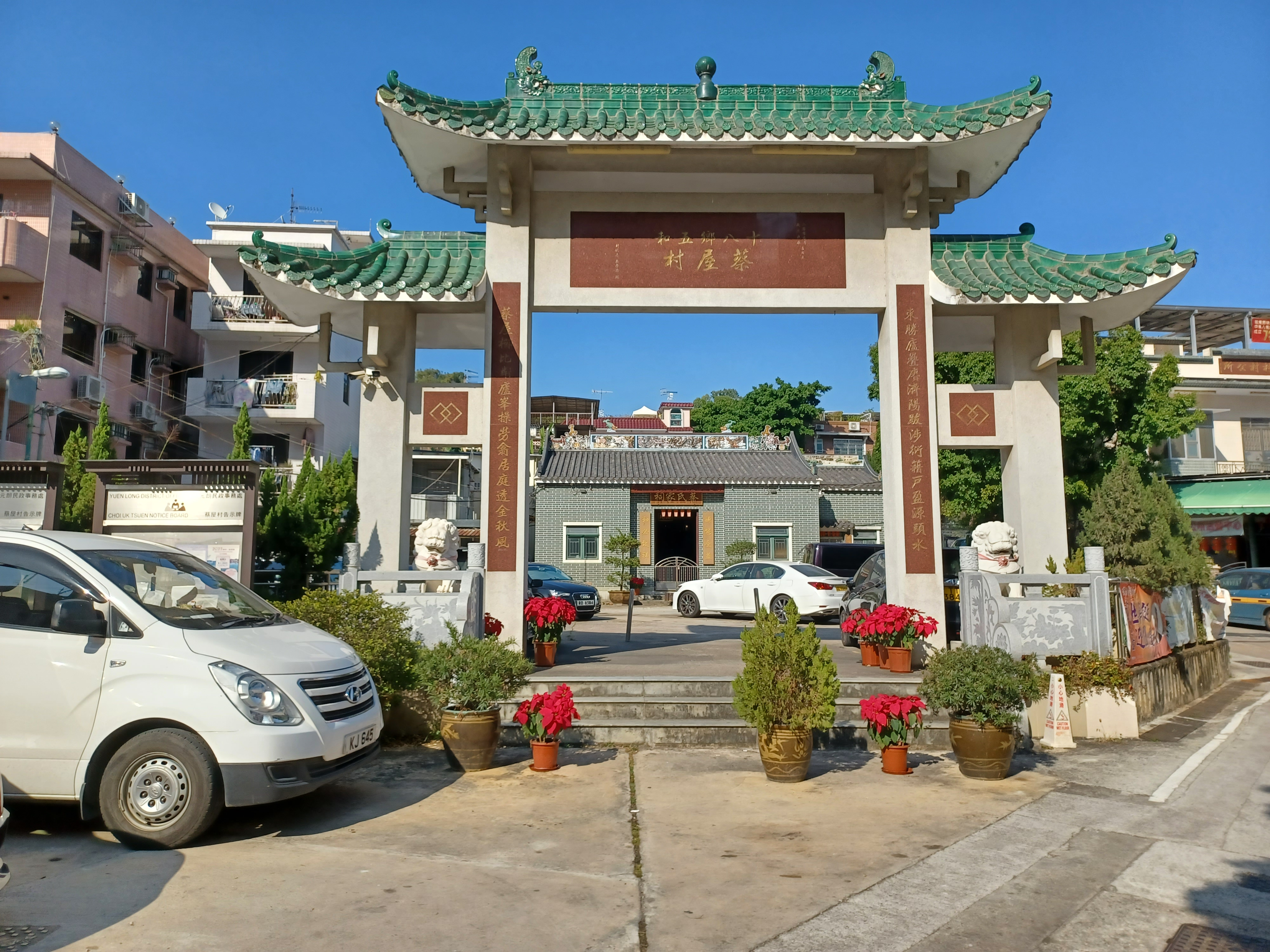
Choi Uk Tsuen archway, with Ancestral Hall in the background

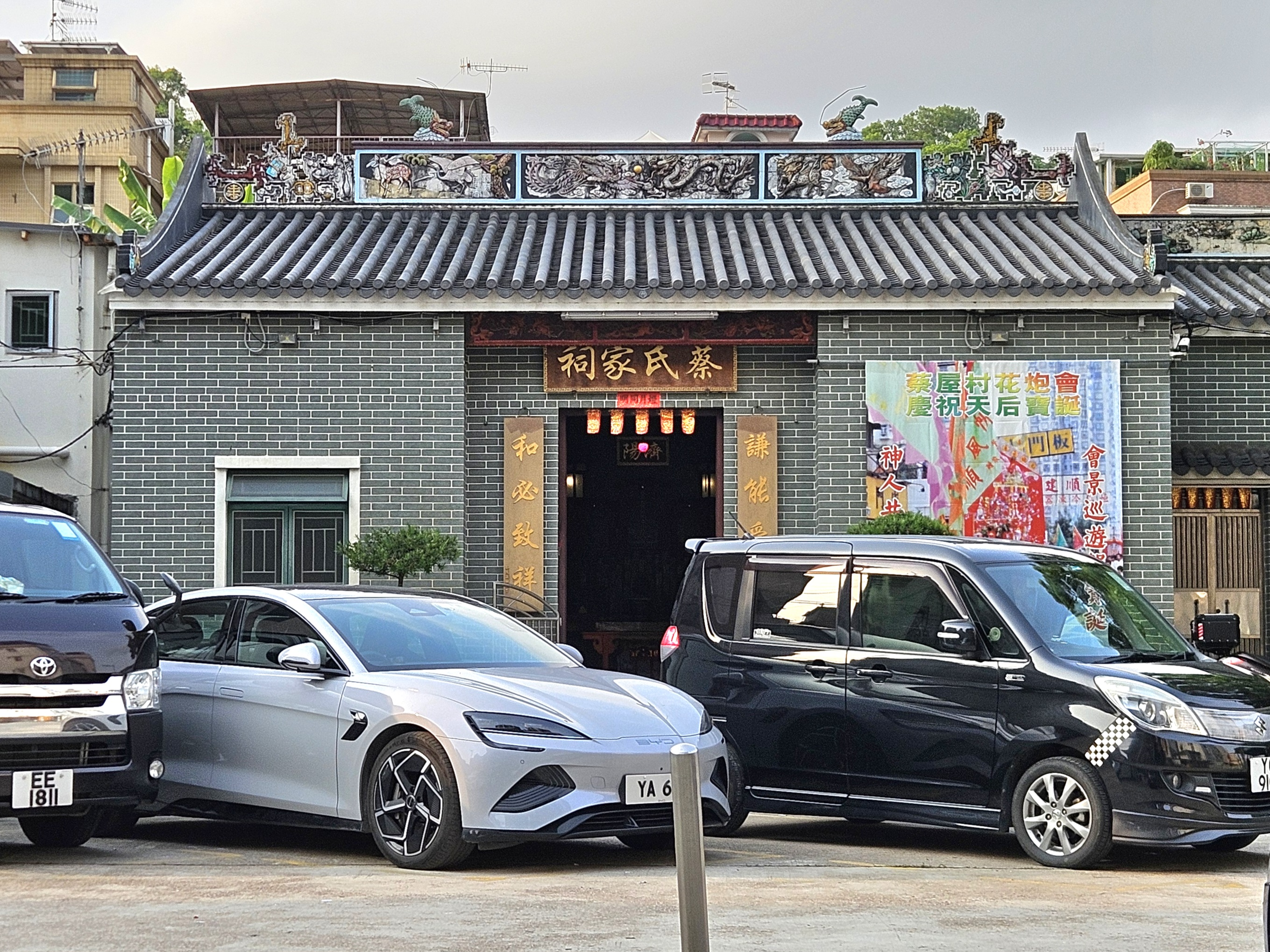
Choi Ancestral Hall, Choi Uk Tsuen

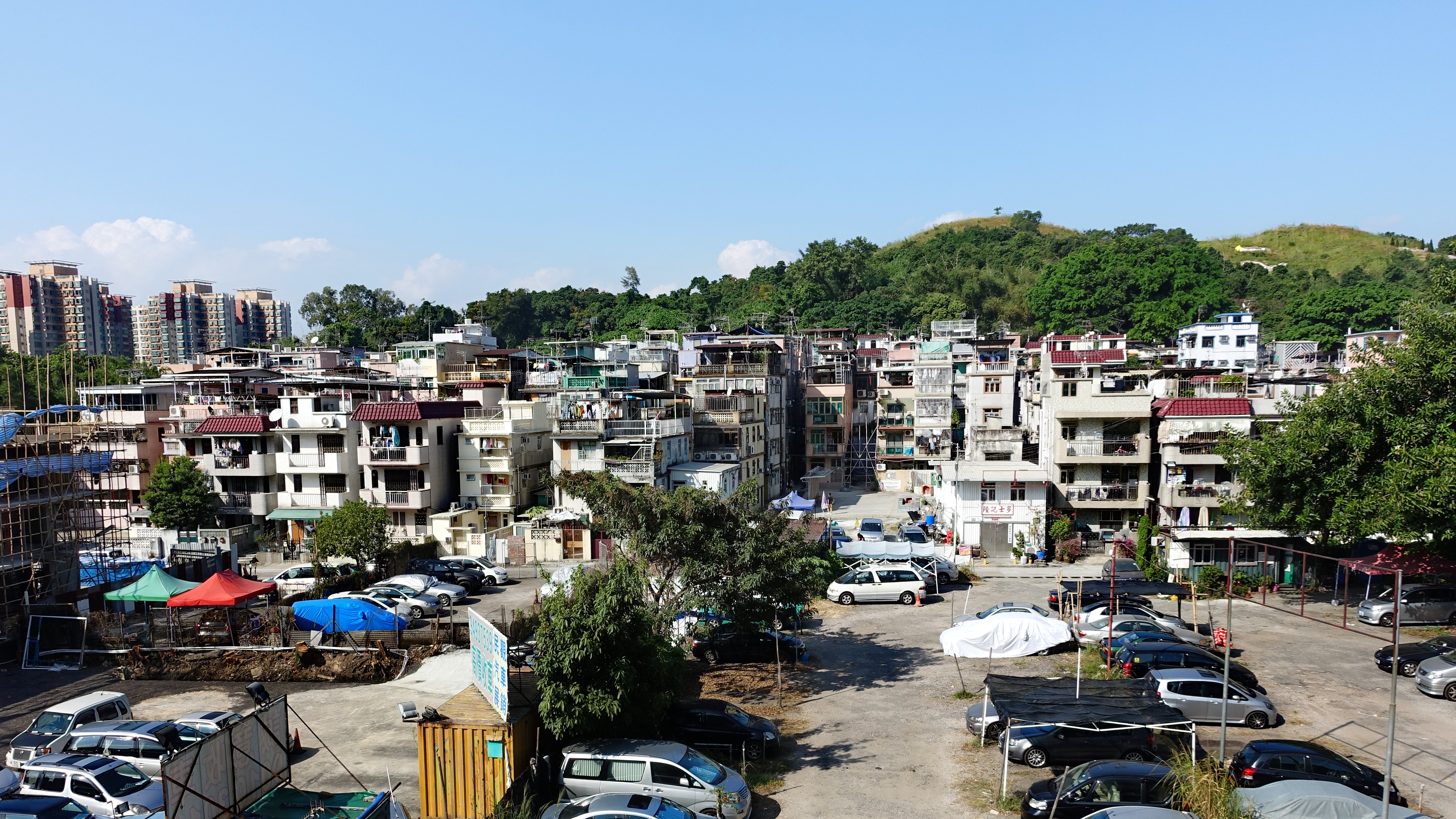
View of Choi Uk Tsuen

Choi Uk Tsuen or Tsoi Uk Tsuen (Chinese: 蔡屋村) is a village in Yuen Long Kau Hui, New Territories, Hong Kong.

== Administration ==
Choi Uk Tsuen is a recognized village under the New Territories Small House Policy. For electoral purposes, Choi Uk Tsuen is located in the Shap Pat Heung North constituency of the Yuen Long District Council. It is currently represented by Shum Ho-kit, who was elected in the 2019 elections.

== Features ==
The village has an ancestral hall which houses photos of the living and deceased people of the village. The village also has a community centre.

== Culture ==
The community living in Choi Uk Tsuen consists of people who have the surname Choi, specifically descendants of three independent family lines who share the same name and have joined the village at various times.

The traditional Poon Choi (Big Bowl Feast) still continues when there is a major event taking place (e.g. wedding celebration and various Chinese Festivals according to the Chinese New year).

== Representation ==
Villagers have to decide who they want to represent the village. The villagers decide through the electoral selection.

Choi Uk Tsuen is part of the Tung Tau alliance (東頭約) or "Joint Meeting Group of Seven Villages", together with Nam Pin Wai, Tung Tau Tsuen, Ying Lung Wai, Shan Pui Tsuen, Wong Uk Tsuen and Tai Wai Tsuen. The Yi Shing Temple in Wong Uk Tsuen is an alliance temple of the Tung Tau Alliance.
