= Wong Uk Tsuen (Yuen Long District) =

Village in Yuen Long District, Hong Kong

Coordinates: 22.44801°N 114.03857°E

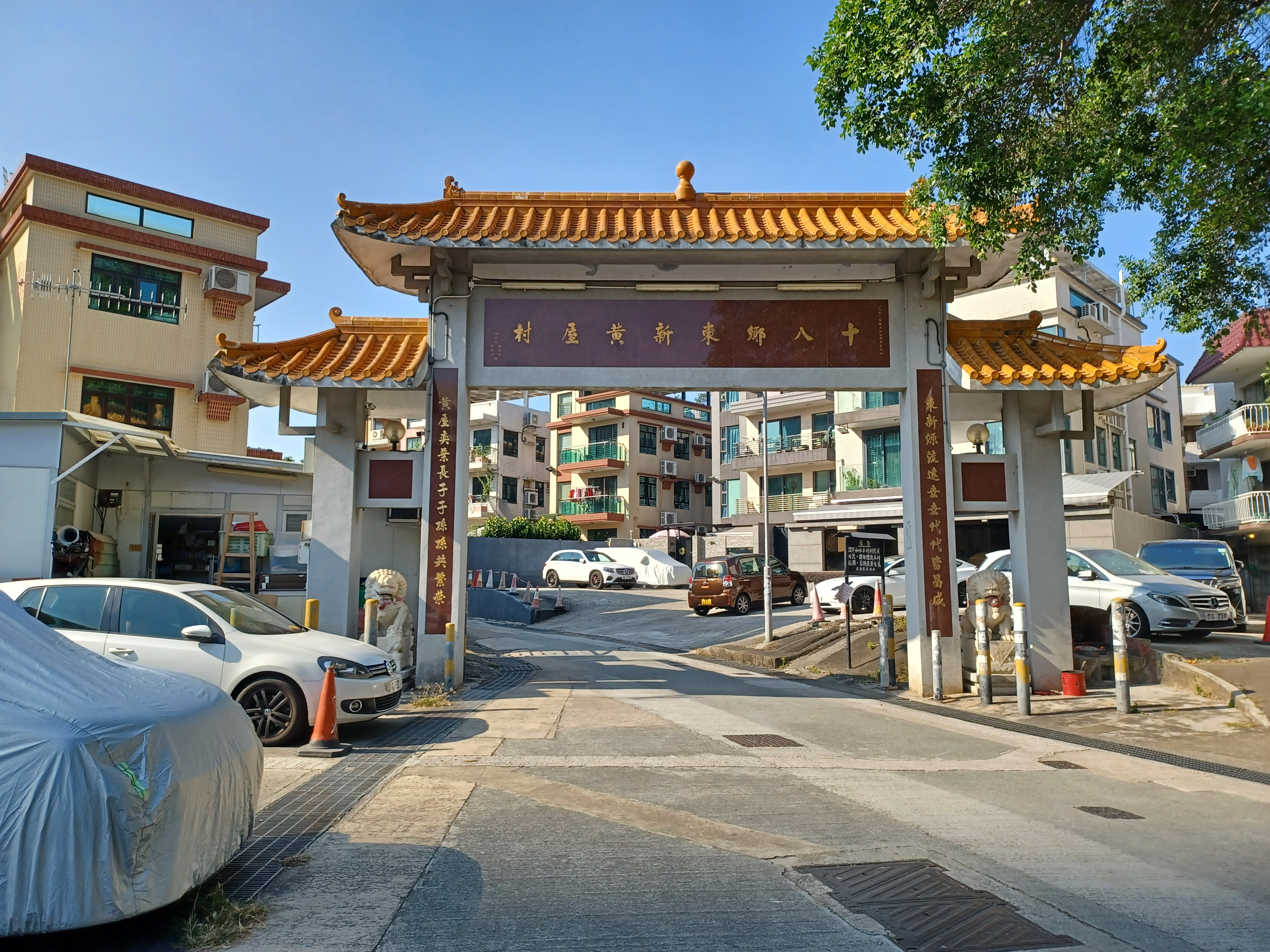
Paifang of Wong Uk Tsuen.

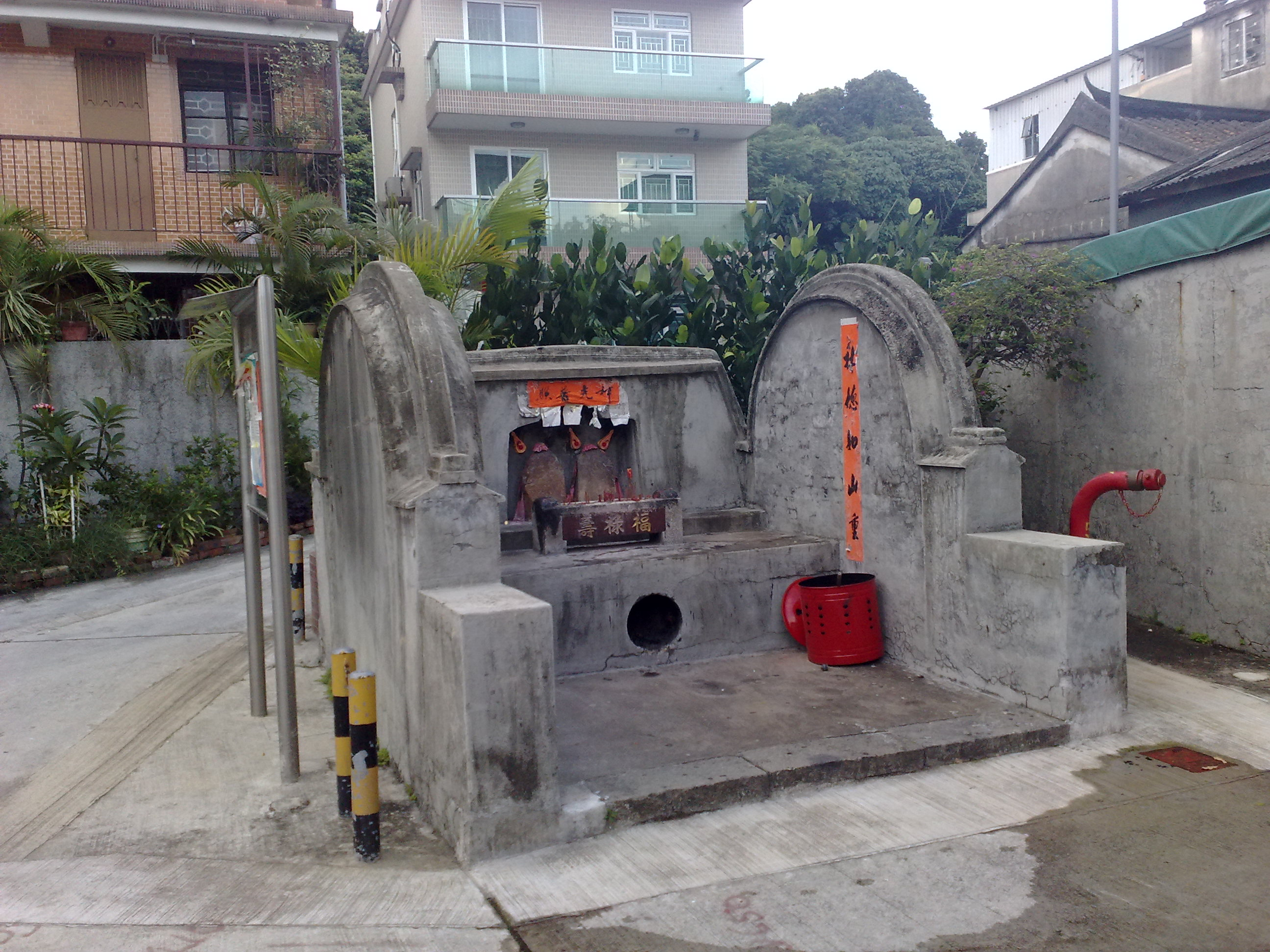
Earth God shrine in Wong Uk Tsuen.

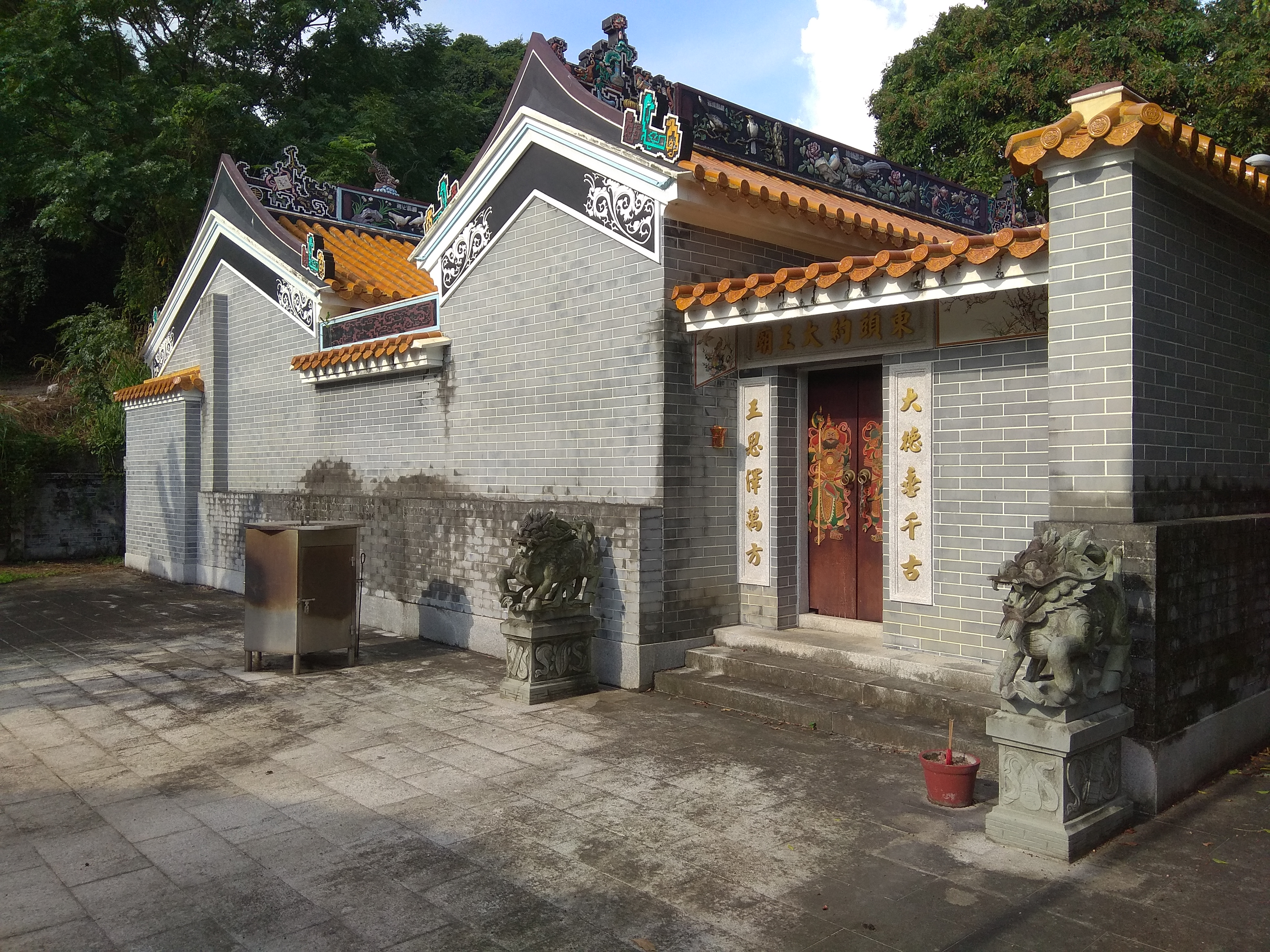
Yi Shing Temple (二聖宮) in Wong Uk Tsuen.

Wong Uk Tsuen (Chinese: 黃屋村) is a village in the Yuen Long Kau Hui area of Yuen Long District, Hong Kong.

== Administration ==
Wong Uk Tsuen is a recognized village under the New Territories Small House Policy. For electoral purposes, Wong Uk Tsuen is located in the Shap Pat Heung North constituency of the Yuen Long District Council. It is currently represented by Shum Ho-kit, who was elected in the 2019 elections.

== History ==
Wong Uk Tsuen is part of the Tung Tau alliance (東頭約) or "Joint Meeting Group of Seven Villages", together with Nam Pin Wai, Tung Tau Tsuen, Choi Uk Tsuen, Ying Lung Wai, Shan Pui Tsuen and Tai Wai Tsuen. The Yi Shing Temple (二聖宮) in Wong Uk Tsuen is an alliance temple of the Tung Tau Alliance.

On 8 September 2021, 58 bullets were seized inside of a house in the village.
