= Sai Pin Wai =

Walled village in the Yuen Long District, Hong Kong

Coordinates: 22.448132°N 114.03221°E

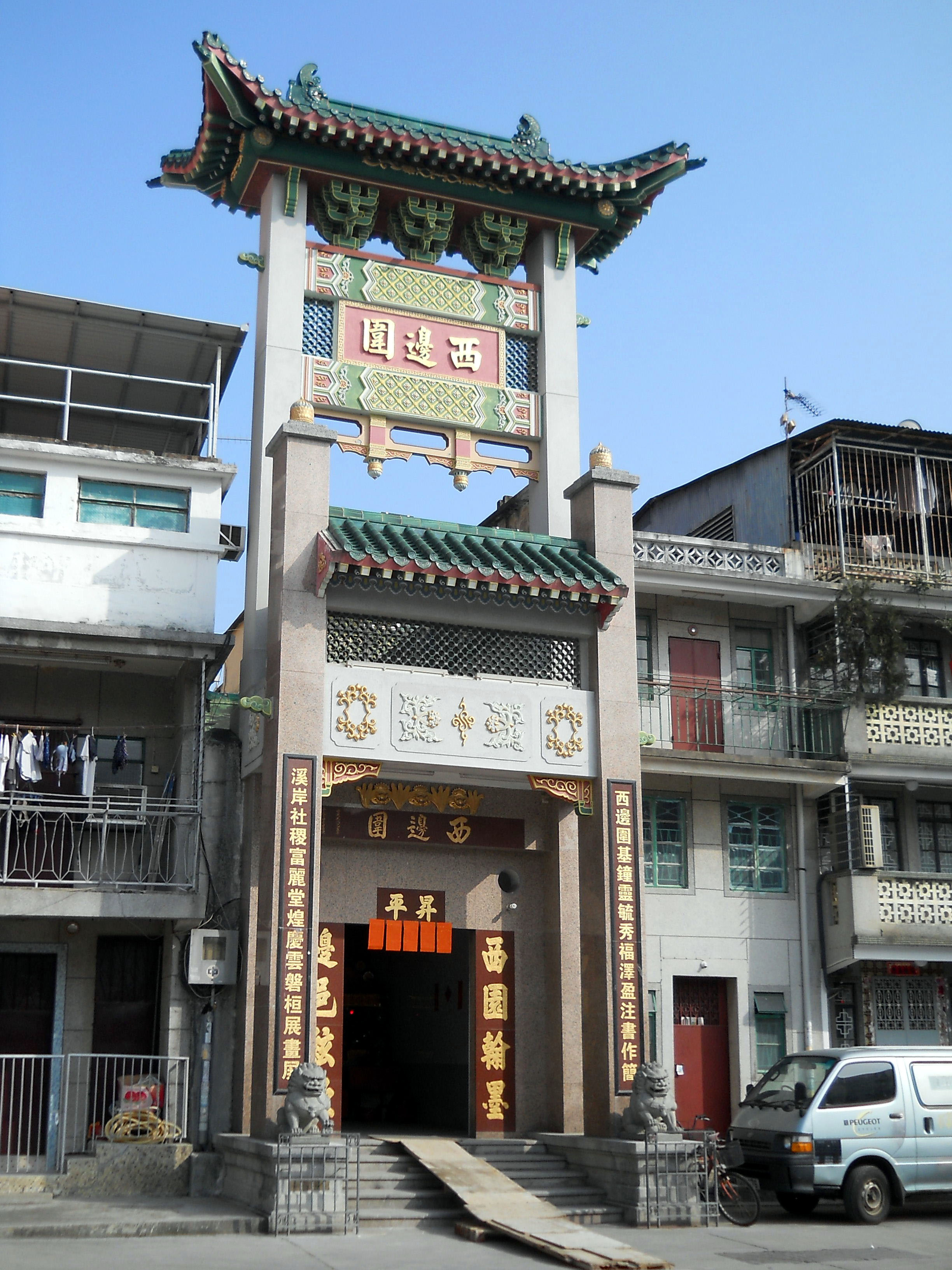
Entrance gate of Sai Pin Wai.

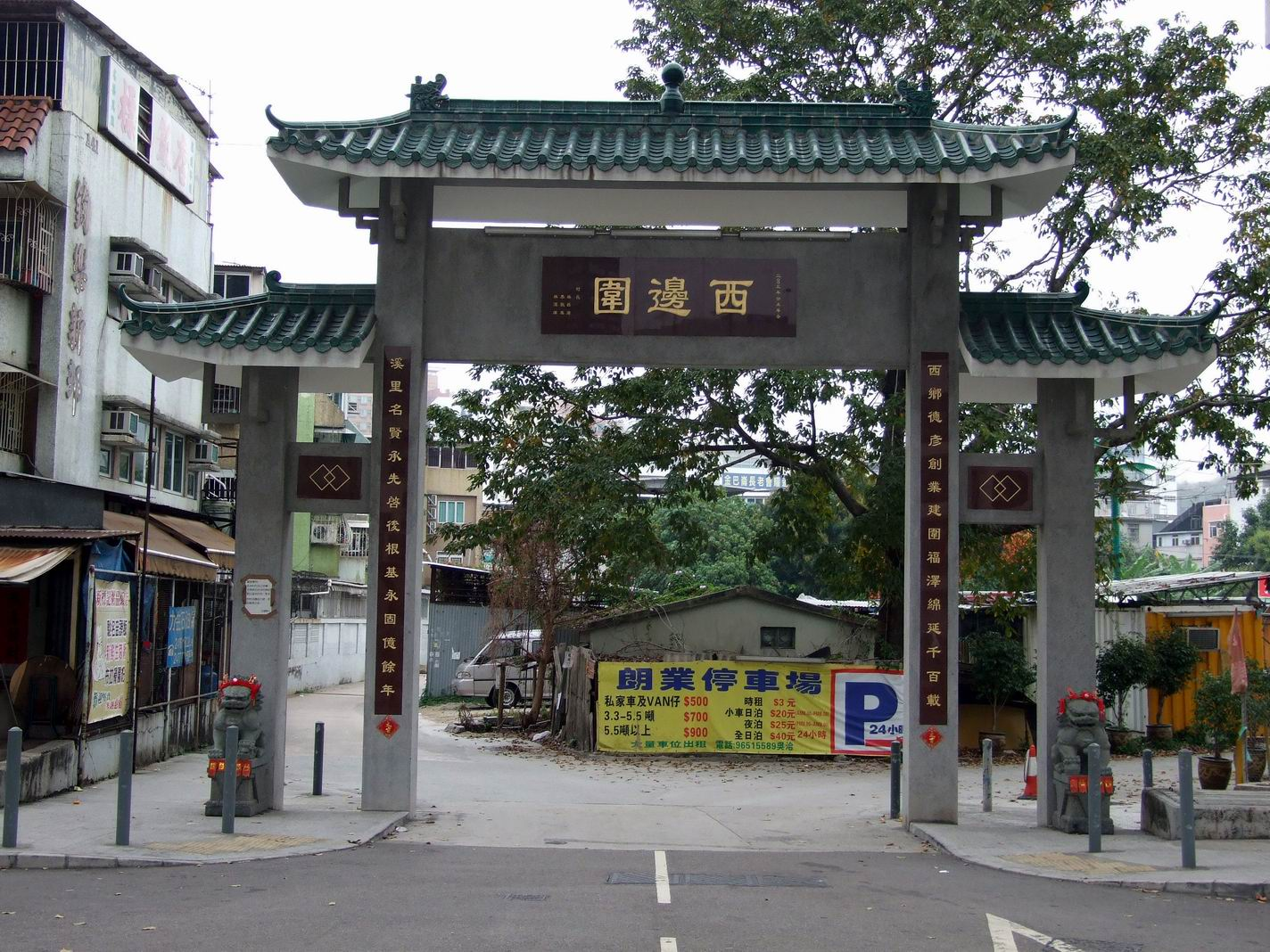
Paifang of Sai Pin Wai along Long Yip Street.

Sai Pin Wai (Chinese: 西邊圍), sometimes transliterated as Sai Bin Wai, is a walled village in the Yuen Long Kau Hui area of Yuen Long District, Hong Kong.

== Administration ==
Sai Pin Wai is a recognized village under the New Territories Small House Policy. For electoral purposes, Sai Pin Wai is located in the Shap Pat Heung North constituency of the Yuen Long District Council. It is currently represented by Shum Ho-kit, who was elected in the 2019 elections.

== History ==
The village was set up by the Tang Clan of Kam Tin probably in the 17th century. The Tang later considered that Sai Pin Wai and the nearby Nam Pin Wai, that they had also set up, were of bad feng shui and moved to nearby Ying Lung Wai.

Sai Pin Wai later became a multi-clan village inhabited by many Punti families surnamed Ng (吳), Lau (劉), Fan (樊), Tang, Cheng (鄭), Leung (梁), Wong (黃) and Lam. The Lams settled in the village in 1626 coming from Xixiang (西鄉) of Baoan, Guangdong Province.

== Features ==
Sai Pin Wai consists mainly of five rows of houses facing west.

== See also ==
- Walled villages of Hong Kong
