= Tai Wai Tsuen (Yuen Long District) =

Walled village in the Yuen Long Kau Hui area of Hong Kong

Coordinates: 22.447055°N 114.03767°E

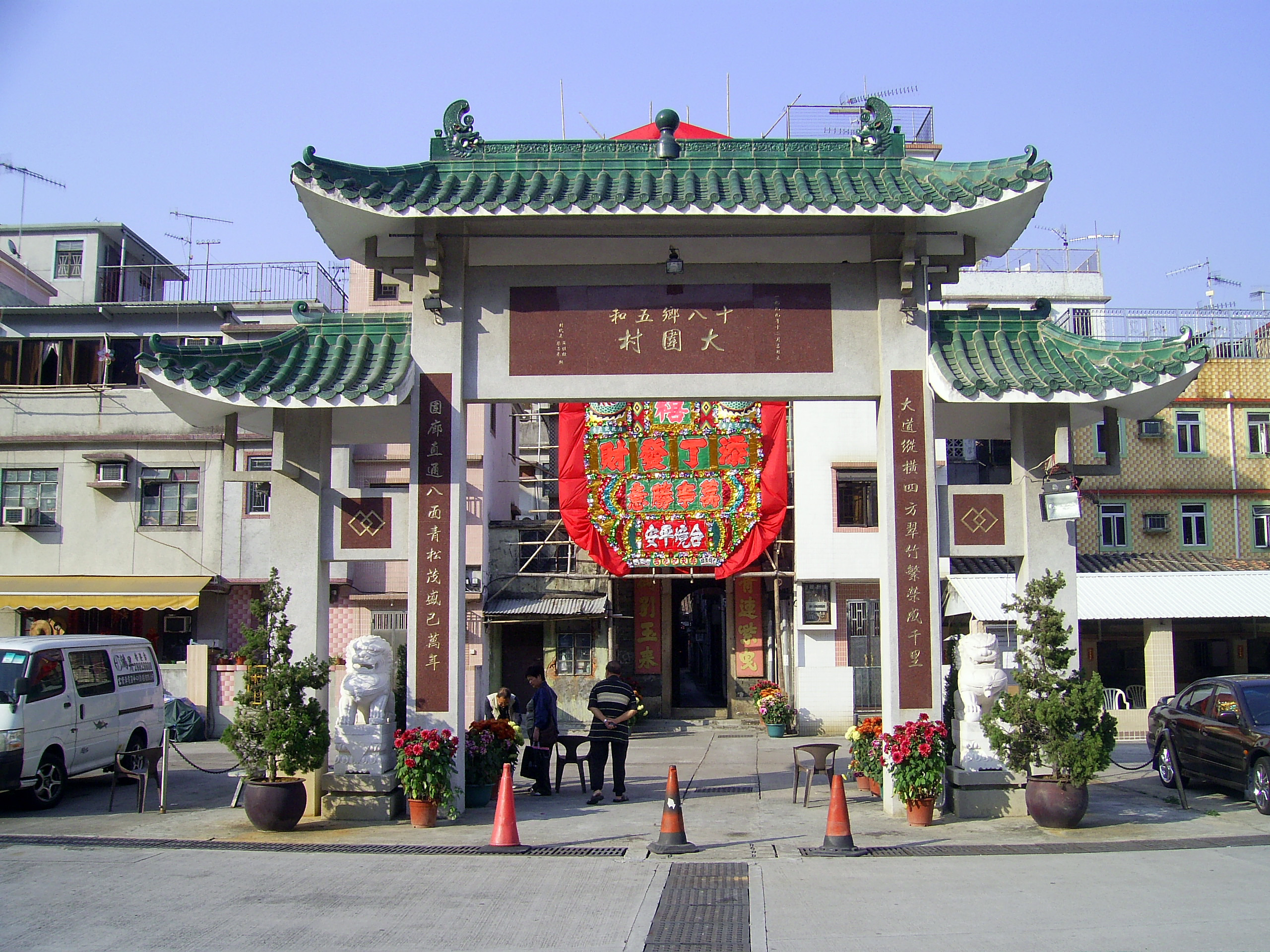
Paifang and entrance gate of Tai Wai Tsuen.

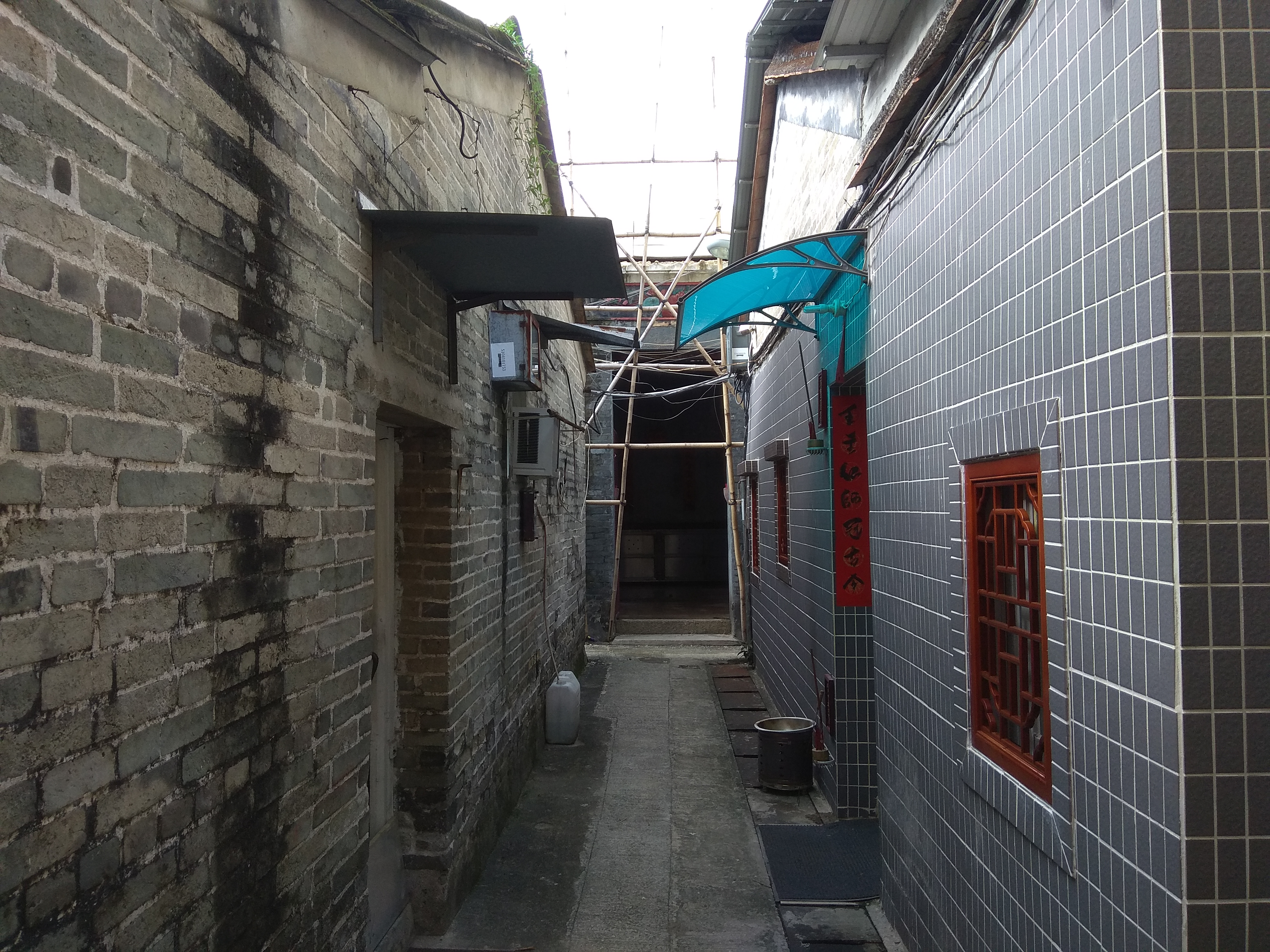
Central axis and village shrine of Tai Wai Tsuen.

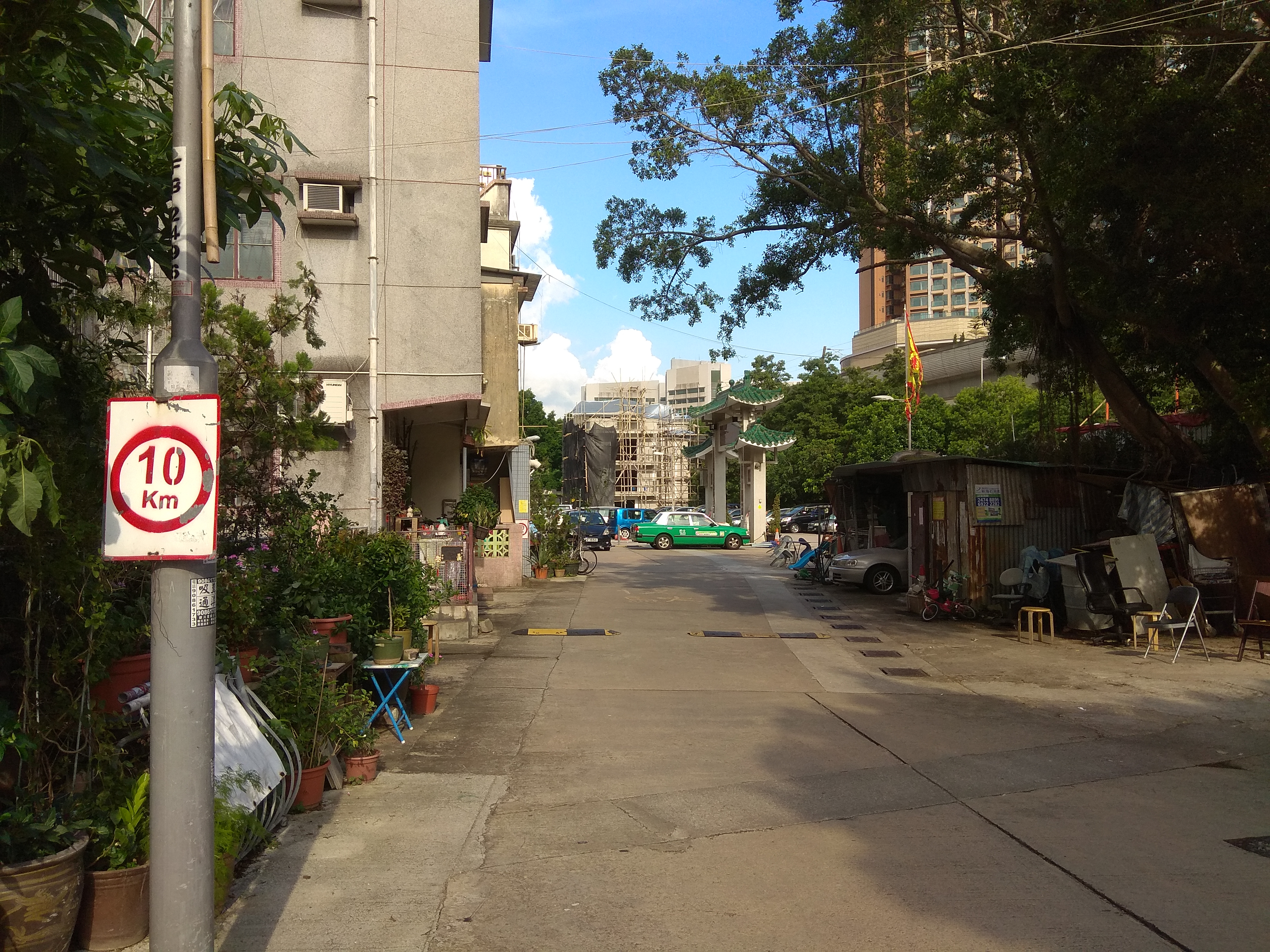
Tai Wai Tsuen.

Tai Wai Tsuen (Chinese: 大圍村) is a walled village in the Yuen Long Kau Hui area of Yuen Long District, Hong Kong.

== Administration ==
Tai Wai Tsuen is a recognized village under the New Territories Small House Policy. For electoral purposes, Tai Wai Tsuen is located in the Shap Pat Heung North constituency of the Yuen Long District Council. It is currently represented by Shum Ho-kit, who was elected in the 2019 elections.

== History ==
Tai Wai Tsuen was founded by the Wong clan and the Choi clan around the early 16th century.

Tai Wai Tsuen is part of the Tung Tau alliance (東頭約) or "Joint Meeting Group of Seven Villages", together with Nam Pin Wai, Tung Tau Tsuen, Choi Uk Tsuen, Ying Lung Wai, Shan Pui Tsuen and Wong Uk Tsuen. The Yi Shing Temple in Wong Uk Tsuen is an alliance temple of the Tung Tau Alliance.

== See also ==
- Walled villages of Hong Kong
