= Tai Kiu Tsuen =

Historic walled village in Shap Pat Heung, Hong Kong

Coordinates: 22.446747°N 114.026780°E

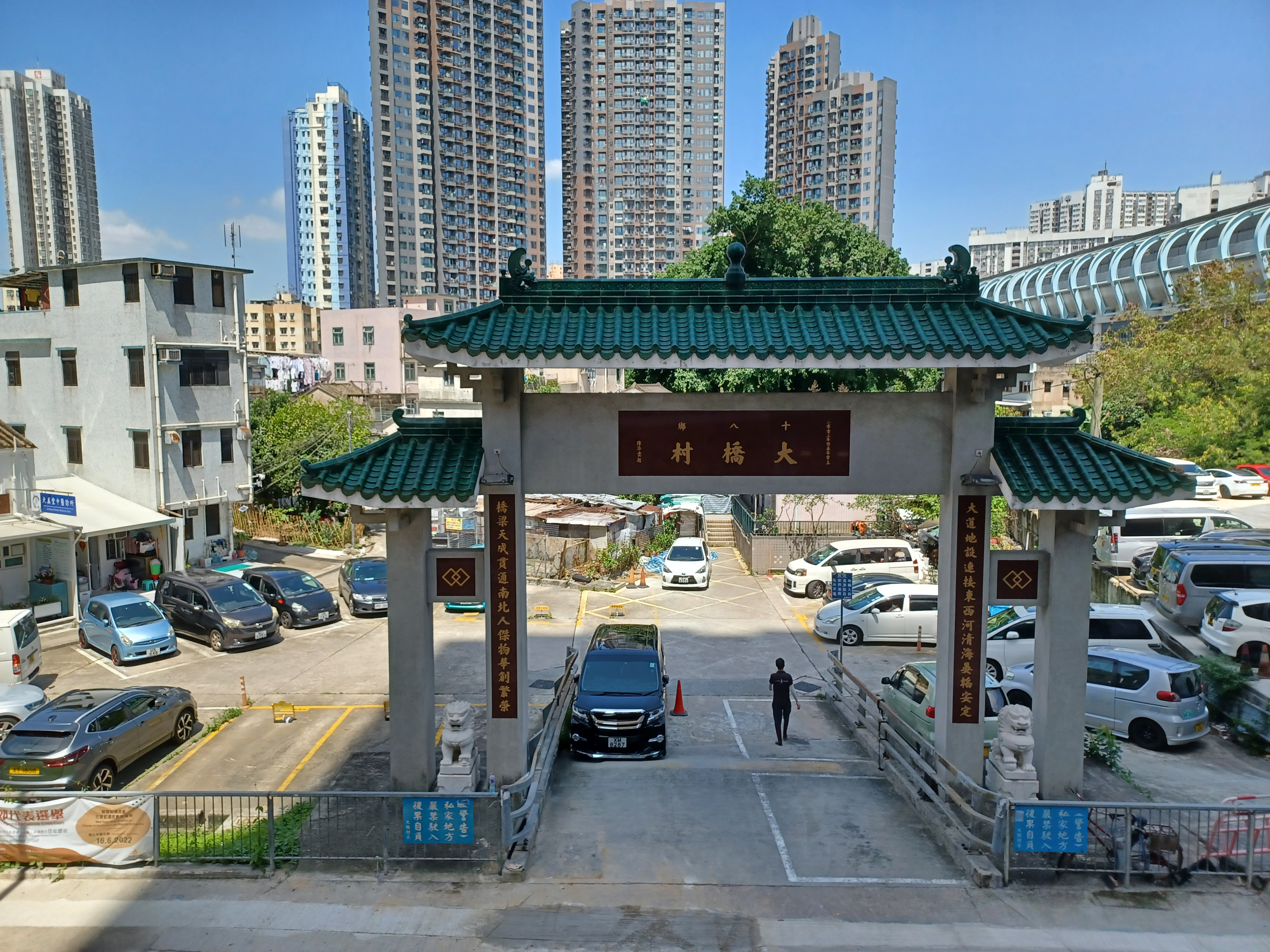
Tai Kiu Tsuen Archway in May 2022.

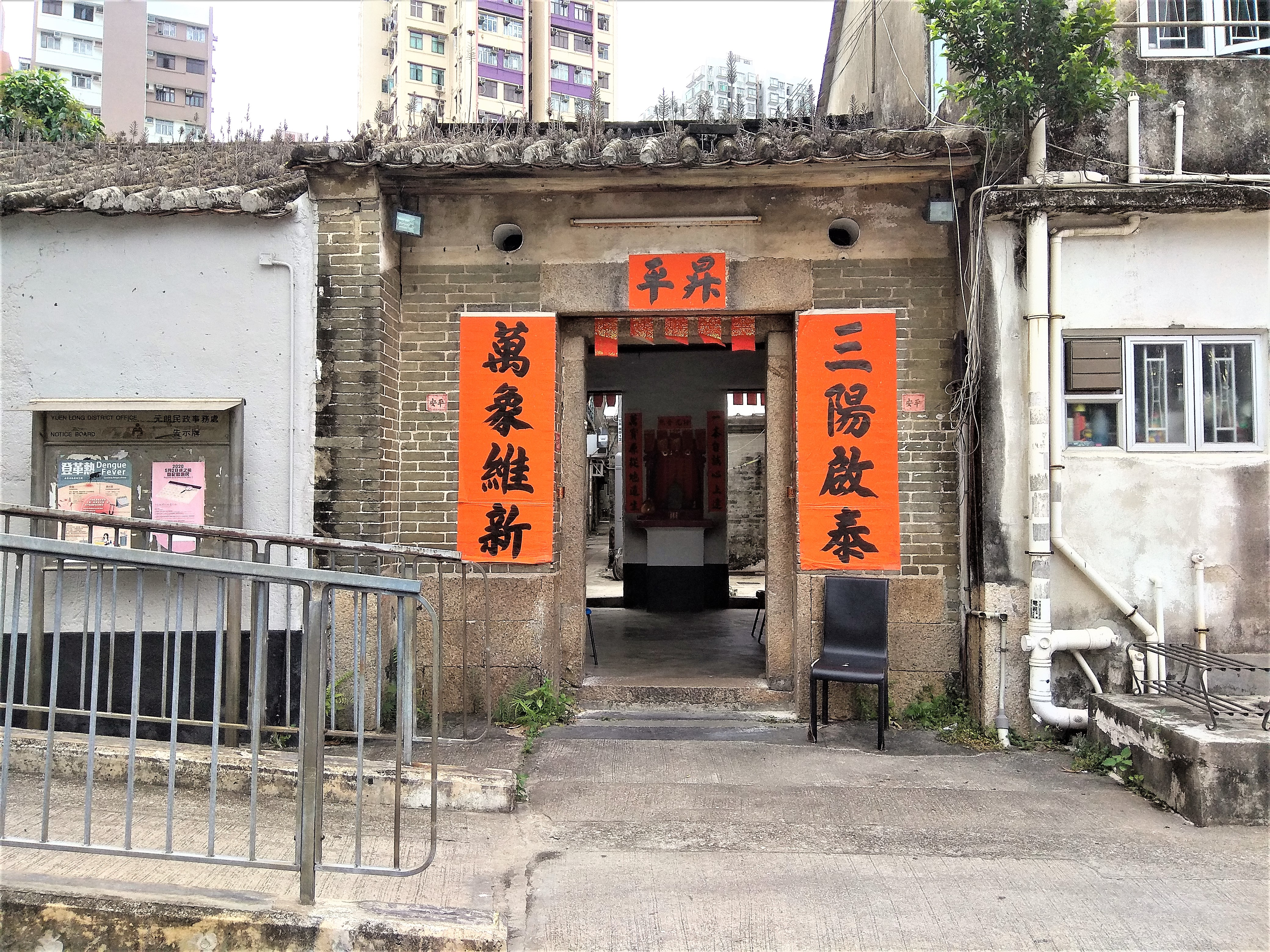
Entrance gate of the walled village.

Tai Kiu Tsuen (Chinese: 大橋村; lit. 'Village of Big Bridge') is a historic walled village in Shap Pat Heung, Yuen Long District, Hong Kong.

== Administration ==
Tai Kiu Tsuen is a recognized village under the New Territories Small House Policy. For electoral purposes, Tai Kiu Tsuen is located in Yuen Long Tung Tau constituency of the Yuen Long District Council. It was formerly represented by Lam Ting-wai, who was elected in the 2019 elections until July 2021.

== See also ==
- Walled villages of Hong Kong
- Yuen Long Kau Hui
