= Ying Lung Wai =

Walled village in the Yuen Long District, Hong Kong

Coordinates: 22.447188°N 114.036905°E

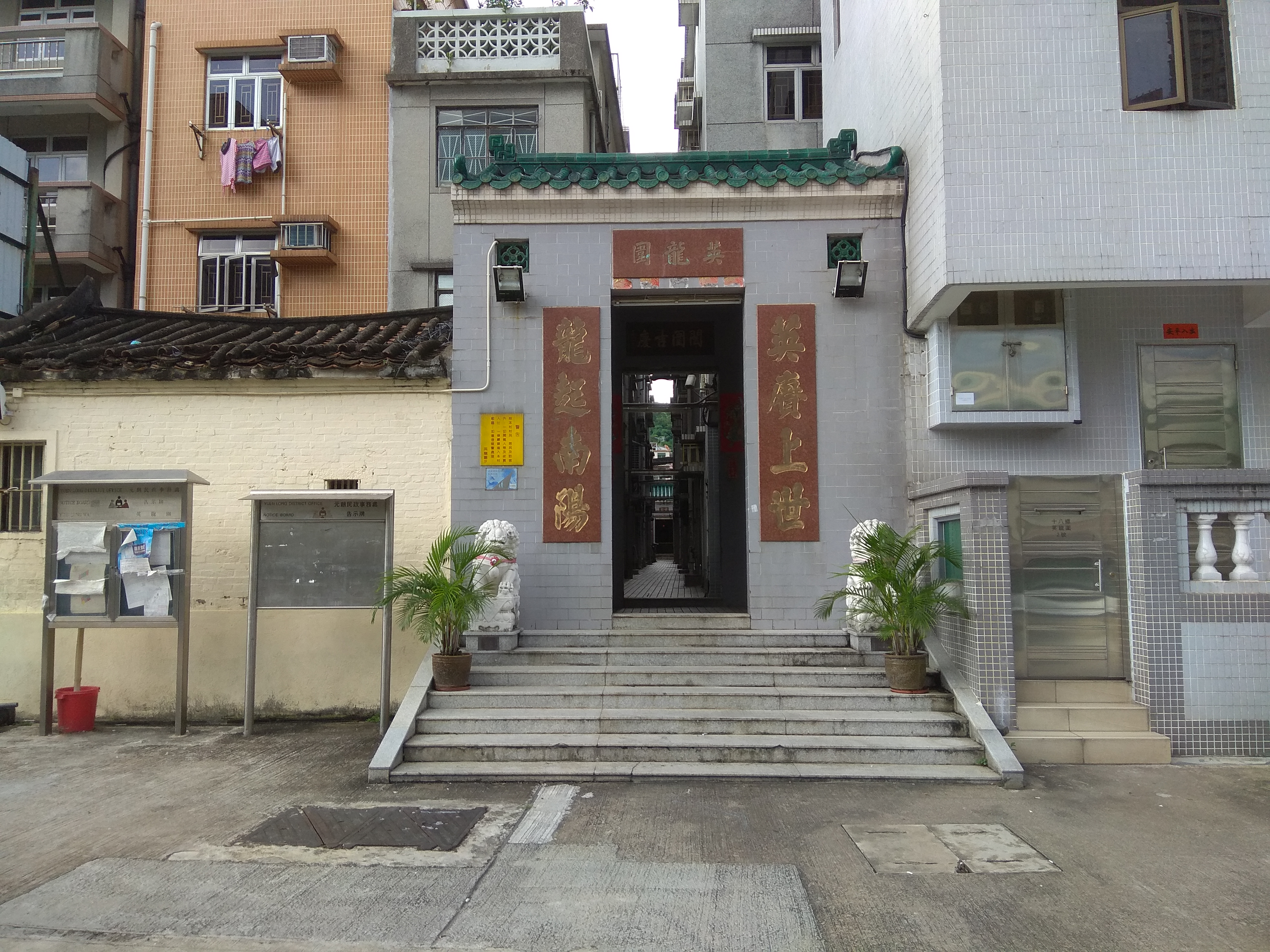
Entrance gate of Ying Lung Wai.

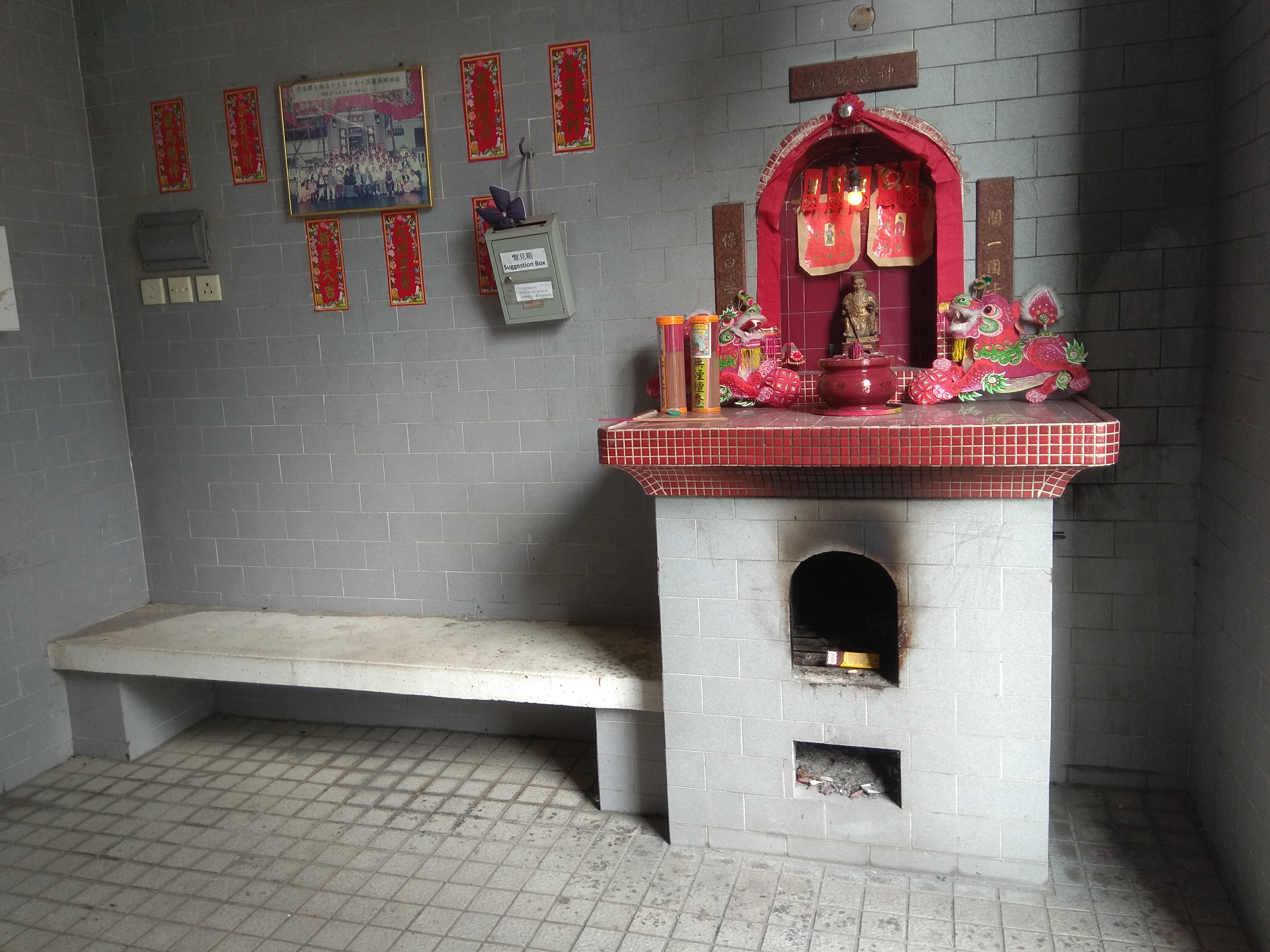
Shrine inside the entrance gate of Ying Lung Wai.

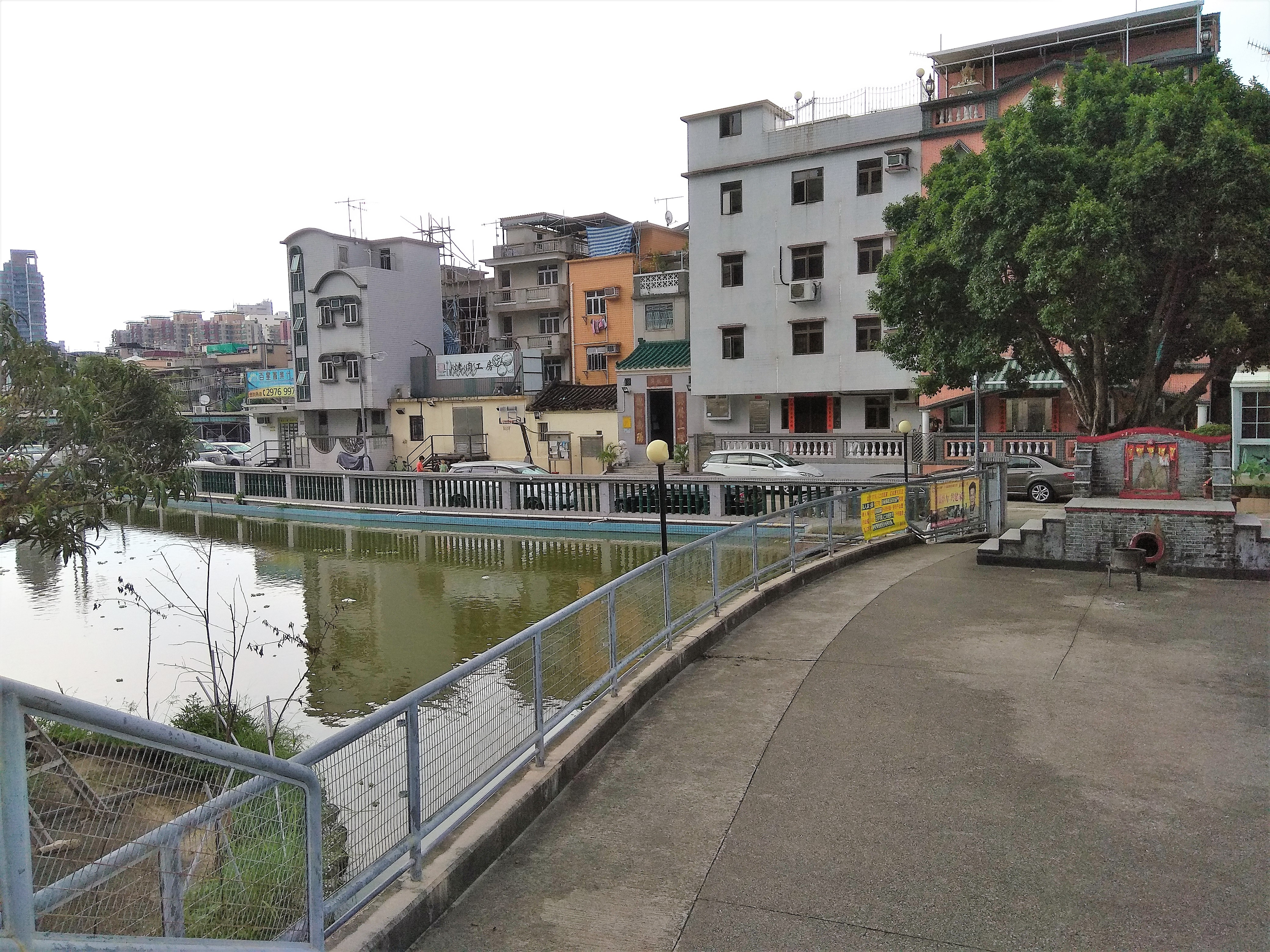
Pond of Ying Lung Wai.

Ying Lung Wai (Chinese: 英龍圍) is a walled village in the Yuen Long Kau Hui area of Yuen Long District, Hong Kong.

== Administration ==
Ying Lung Wai is a recognized village under the New Territories Small House Policy.

== History ==
Ying Lung Wai was established by a branch of the Tang Clan of Kam Tin, who had set up the nearby villages of Sai Pin Wai and Nam Pin Wai, but later moved to the area to establish the village due to feng shui reasons.

At the time of the 1911 census, the population of Ying Lung Wai was 94. The number of males was 38.

Ying Lung Wai is part of the Tung Tau alliance (東頭約) or "Joint Meeting Group of Seven Villages", together with Nam Pin Wai, Tung Tau Tsuen, Choi Uk Tsuen, Shan Pui Tsuen, Wong Uk Tsuen and Tai Wai Tsuen. The Yi Shing Temple in Wong Uk Tsuen is an alliance temple of the Tung Tau Alliance.

== See also ==
- Walled villages of Hong Kong
