= Yuen Long Kau Hui =

Area in Yuen Long, Yuen Long District, Hong Kong

Coordinates: 22.447469°N 114.032555°E

- Traditional Chinese: 元朗舊墟
- Simplified Chinese: 元朗旧墟
- Literal meaning: Yuen Long Old Market
Transcriptions
Standard Mandarin
- Hanyu Pinyin: Yuán Lǎng Jiùxū
Yue: Cantonese
- Jyutping: Jyun4 long5 gau6 heoi1

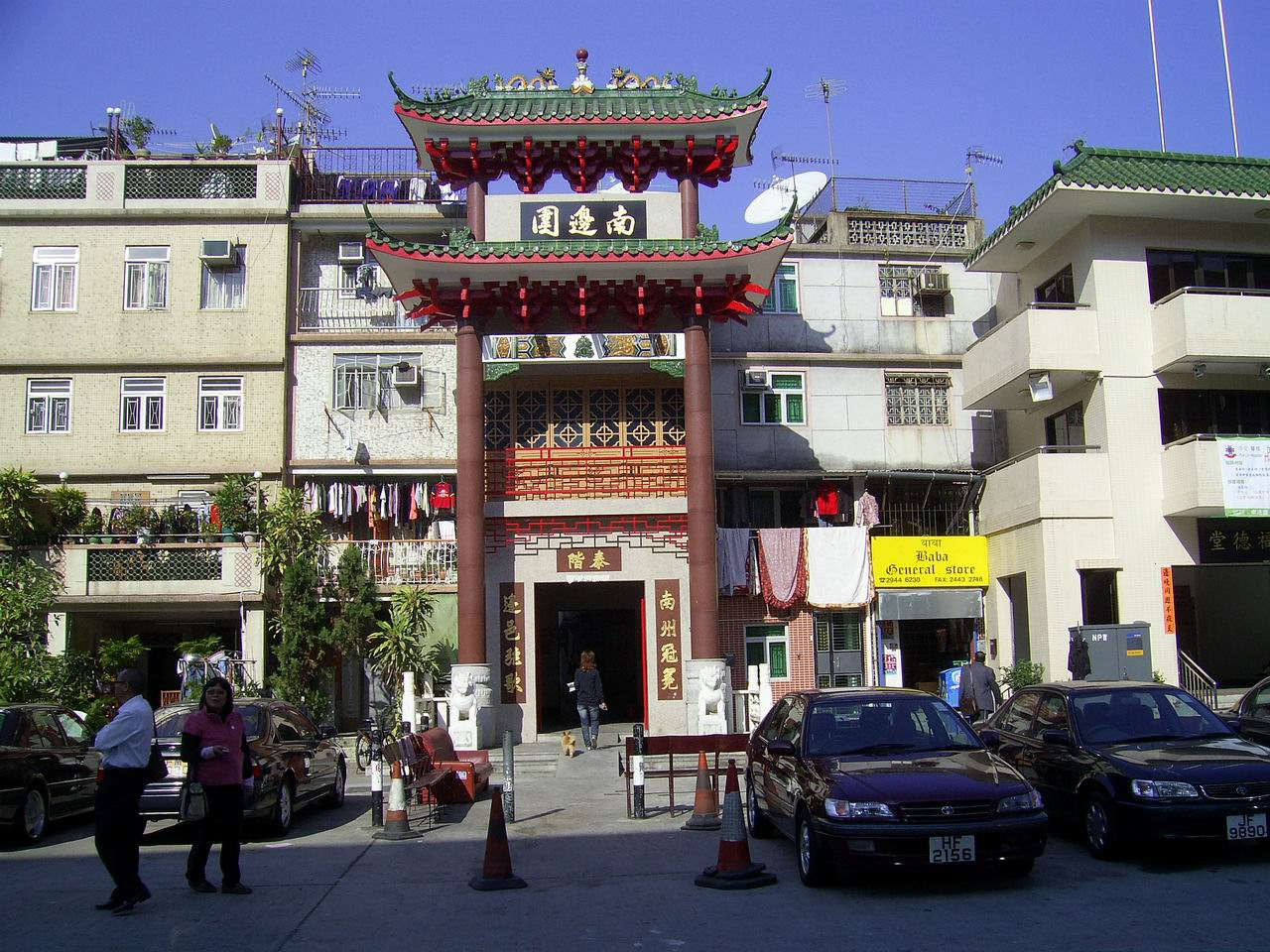
Entrance gate of Nam Pin Wai walled village.

Yuen Long Kau Hui is an area in Yuen Long, Yuen Long District, in the western New Territories of Hong Kong.

== Geography ==
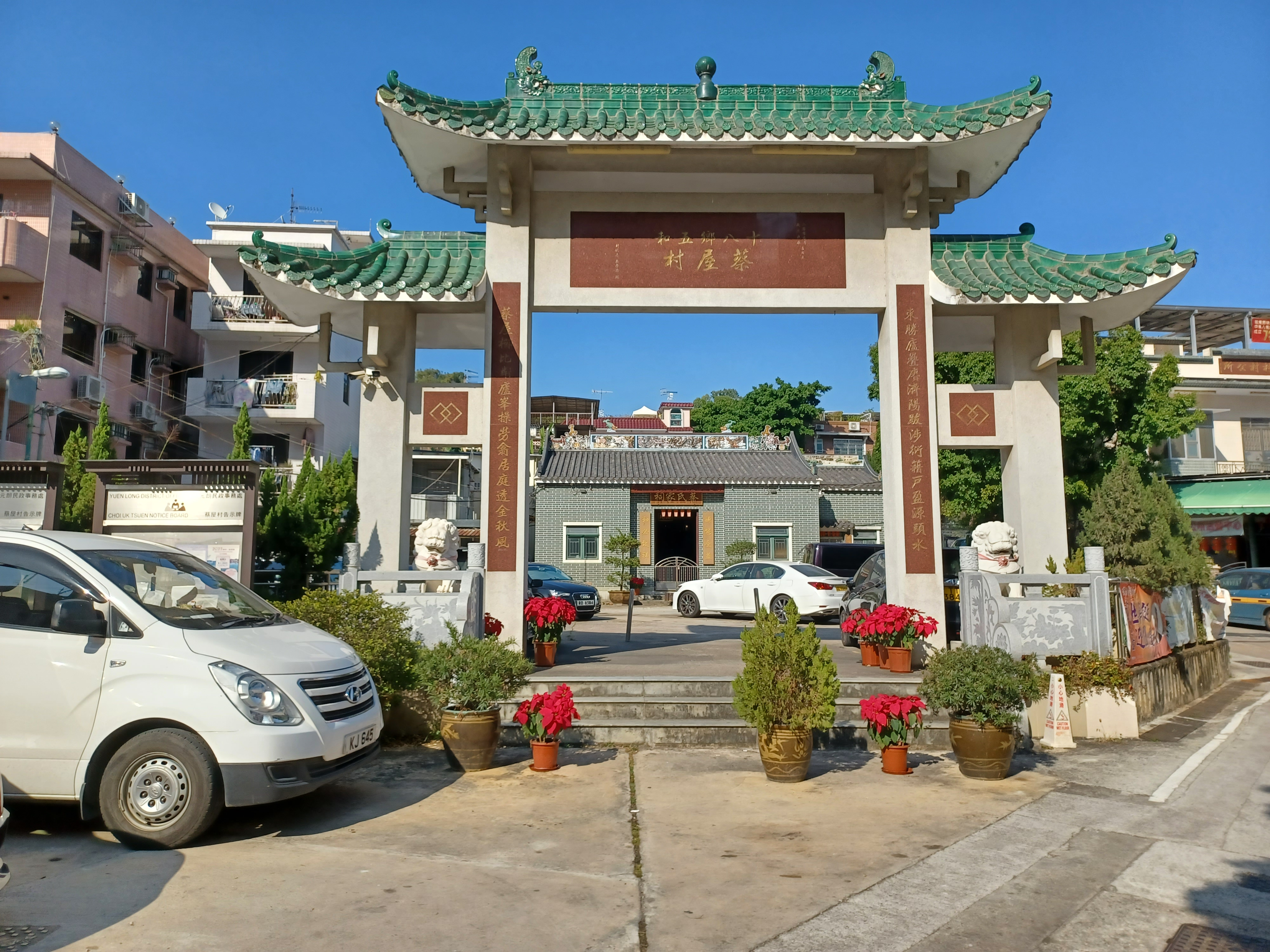
Archway and ancestral hall of Choi Uk Tsuen.

Yuen Long Kau Hui is located in the north-east of the present Yuen Long Town. It is sited south of a small hill and directly north of Yuen Long MTR station. It comprises several villages, which are part of the Shap Pat Heung Rural Committee. From West to East:

- Sai Pin Wai or Sai Bin Wai (西邊圍), a walled village
- Nam Pin Wai or Nam Bin Wai (南邊圍), a walled village
- Tung Tau Tsuen (東頭村)
- Tsoi Uk Tsuen or Choi Uk Tsuen (蔡屋村)
- Ying Lung Wai (英龍圍), a walled village
- Tai Wai Tsuen (大圍村), a walled village
- Wong Uk Tsuen (黃屋村)

And also:

- Shan Pui Tsuen (山背村), located north of the hill. A small boat near the village entrance serves as a ferry across the Shan Pui River towards Nam Sang Wai in the north.
- Tai Kiu Tsuen (大橋村), located west of the main group of villages and across the river, directly south of Long Ping MTR station.

== History ==
=== Market ===
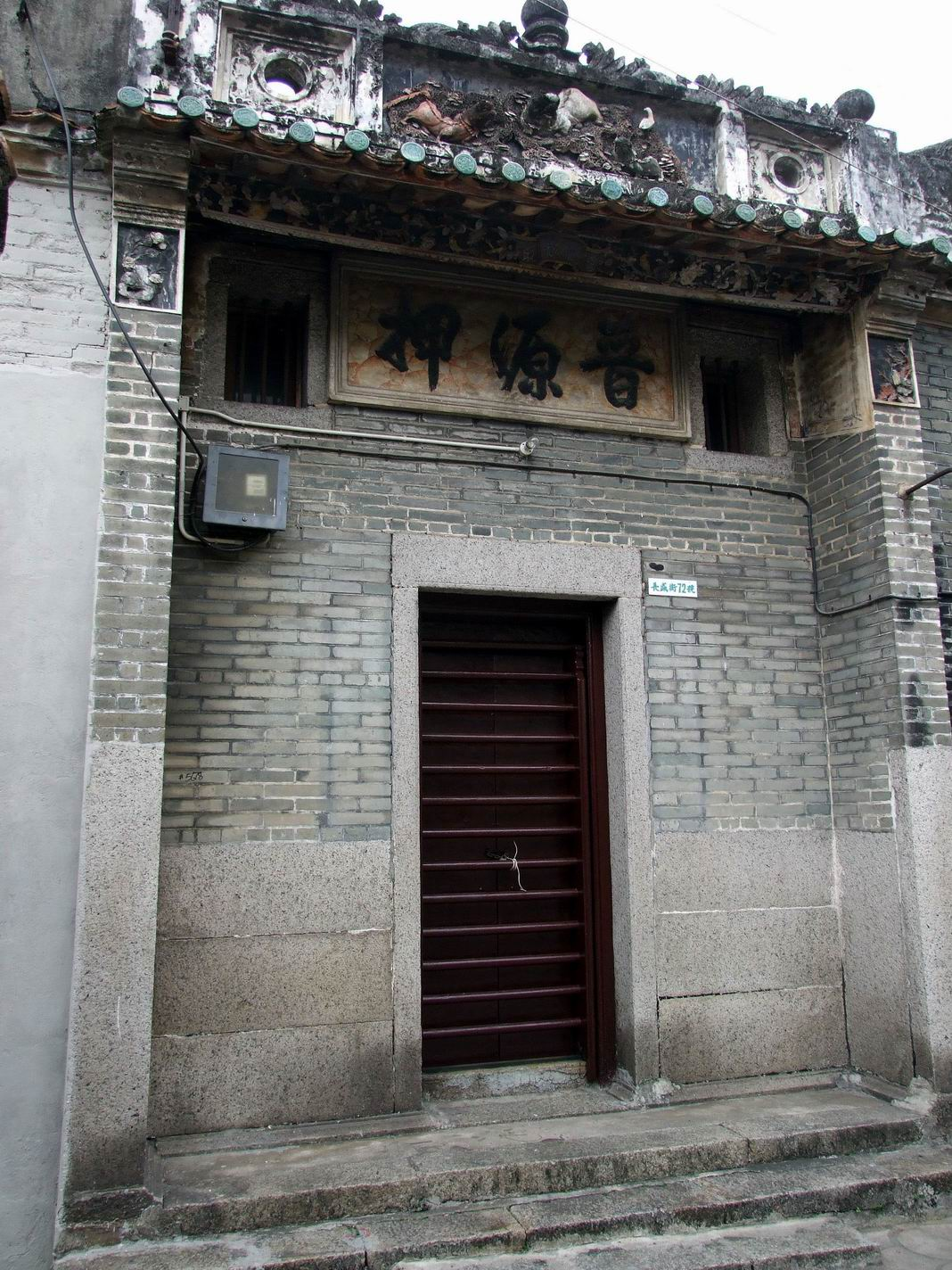
Chun Yuen Ngat pawnshop in Cheung Shing Street.

The original Yuen Long Town was not located in the busiest place of present-day Yuen Long, namely Yuen Long Main Road (元朗大馬路), part of Castle Peak Road. The earliest market in Yuen Long was established and developed in the late Ming dynasty (1368–1644) south of the main road, in Tai Kiu Tun (大橋墩) near Tai Kei Leng (大旗嶺). The Coastal ban caused the evacuation of most of the population of present-day Hong Kong and lasted eight years in Yuen Long. In 1669, during the reign of the Kangxi Emperor in the Qing dynasty, that eight-year ban was lifted. The same year, the market was moved north to the area now known as Yuen Long Kau Hui. This was done for political reasons. The Market was set up by Tang Man-wai (鄧文蔚), a 23rd generation member of the Tang Clan of Kam Tin. He was a district magistrate of Longyou County in Zhejiang Province. While it is far from the coast today, it was beside the seashore when the market was first built.

Agricultural produce and daily necessities for inhabitants in western New Territories were sold at the market. Farmers, boat people and traders came from as far as the nearby coastal districts of Guangdong Province. Shop houses, inns, residential houses and temples with street sellers clustered along the streets made it a commercial as well as a cultural centre. Temples were built for worship and to judge disputes. Special market days, xuri (墟日), were scheduled on the 3rd, 6th and 9th days of the three ten-day periods of each lunar month. The market operated from 6 in the morning until dusk. Two entrance gates, one in the east, Tung Mun (東門), and one in the south, Nam Mun (南門), were locked up after the market hours to guard against theft and robbery. At its peak in the early 20th century, the Hui had around one hundred shops. The market was managed by the Kwong Yu Tong (光裕堂), a trust of a branch of the Tangs in Kam Tin.

After the British leased the New Territories in 1898, they built Castle Peak Road to connect major areas of the New Territories and Kowloon. The villagers proposed and moved the market town to the main road across the river. Yuen Long San Hui (元朗新墟; 'Yuen Long New Market'), was established in 1915 and after WWII the business of Yuen Long Kau Hui declined and most of the shops closed.

=== Villages ===
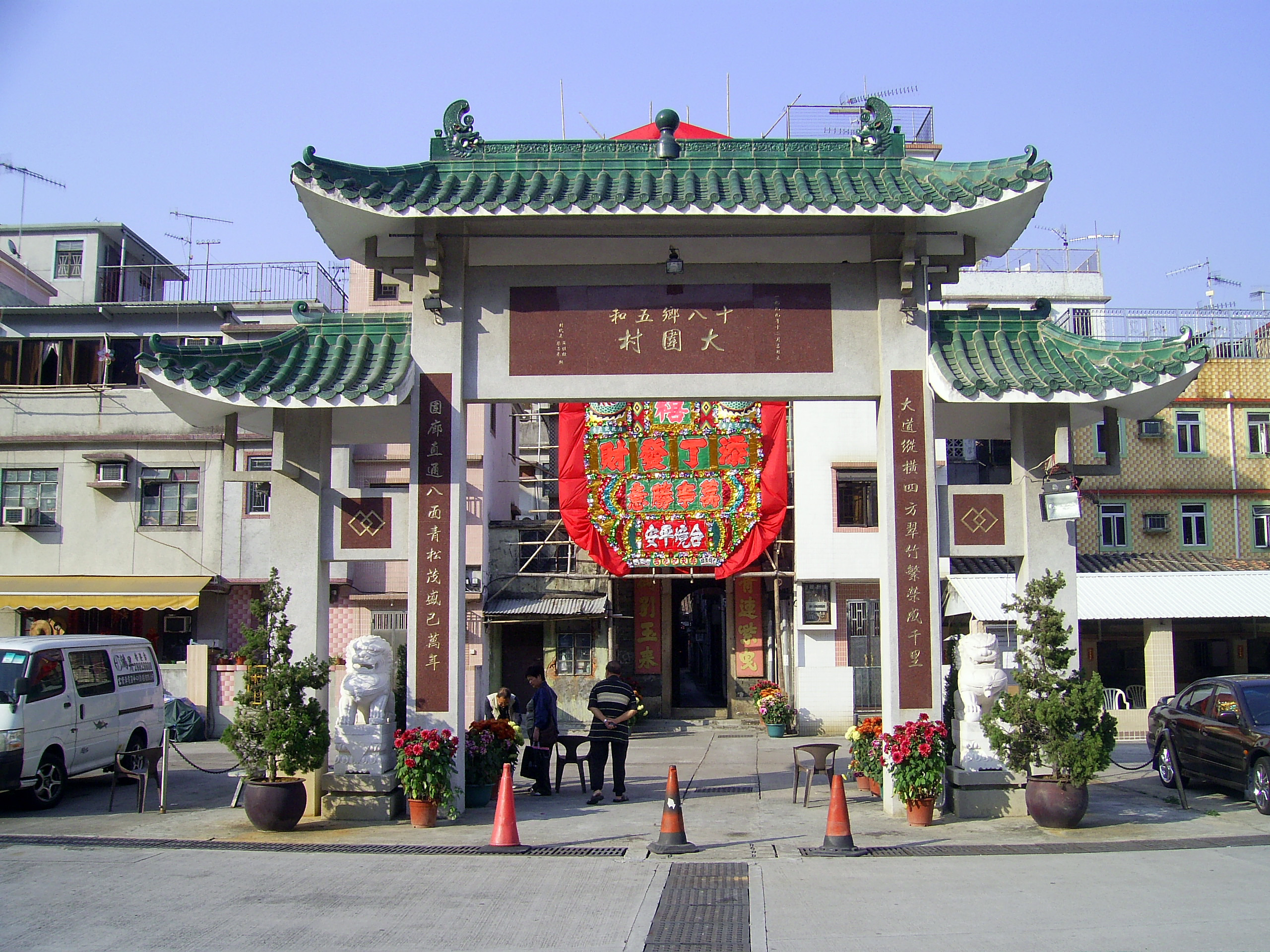
Archway and entrance gate of Tai Wai Tsuen.

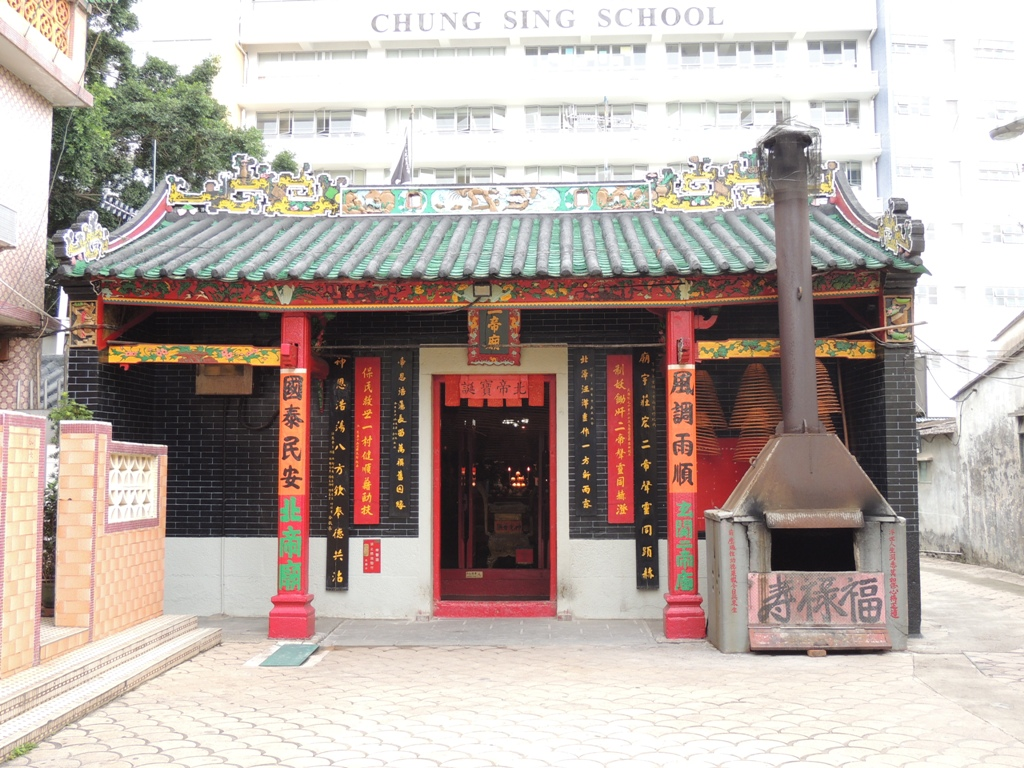
Yuen Kwan Yi Tai Temple in Cheung Shing Street.

Sai Pin Wai is located on the western side of the market. It consists mainly of five rows of houses facing west. The village was set up by the Tangs of Kam Tin probably in the 17th century. It later became a multi-clan village inhabited by many Punti families surnamed Ng (吳), Lau (劉), Fan (樊), Tang, Cheng (鄭), Leung (梁), Wong (黃) and Lam. The Lams settled in the village in 1626 coming from Xixiang (西鄉) of Baoan, Guangdong Province.

Nam Pin Wai was set up by members of the Tang Clan.

Tung Tau Tsuen (東頭村; 'village to the east') is so called because it is located in the east of the old Yuen Long Kau Hui market. It was established in the 17th century by the members of several clans, the Chans (陳) being the major one, and others being the Loks (駱) and the Lis (李) from Dongguan. The village was originally called Chan Lok Li Tsuen (陳駱李村). Ss. Peter and Paul Church, located at No. 201 Castle Peak Road in Yuen Long near Shui Pin Tsuen, was originally built in 1925 in Tung Tau Tsuen. It was relocated and rebuilt on the present Castle Peak Road site in 1958.

Choi Uk Tsuen.

Ying Lung Wai was established by a branch of the Kam Tin Tangs, who were originally in Nam Pin Wai but moved to the area to establish the village due to feng shui reasons.

Tai Wai Tsuen was founded by the Wong clan and the Choi clan around the early 16th century.

Wong Uk Tsuen

Shan Pui Tsuen was founded by Lam Siu-yuen (林兆元), a 13th generation member of the Lam Clan, who moved from Tai Wai Tsuen some 200 years ago.

Tai Kiu Tsuen (大橋村; 'Village of Big Bridge') was so named because a stone bridge was located at its west. It was established some 400 years ago by four clans: the Chan (陳), the Tang (鄧), the Tse (謝) and the Leung (梁). The Tangs probably came from Ping Shan and the Chans from Bao'an of Guangdong Province.

=== Villages alliance ===
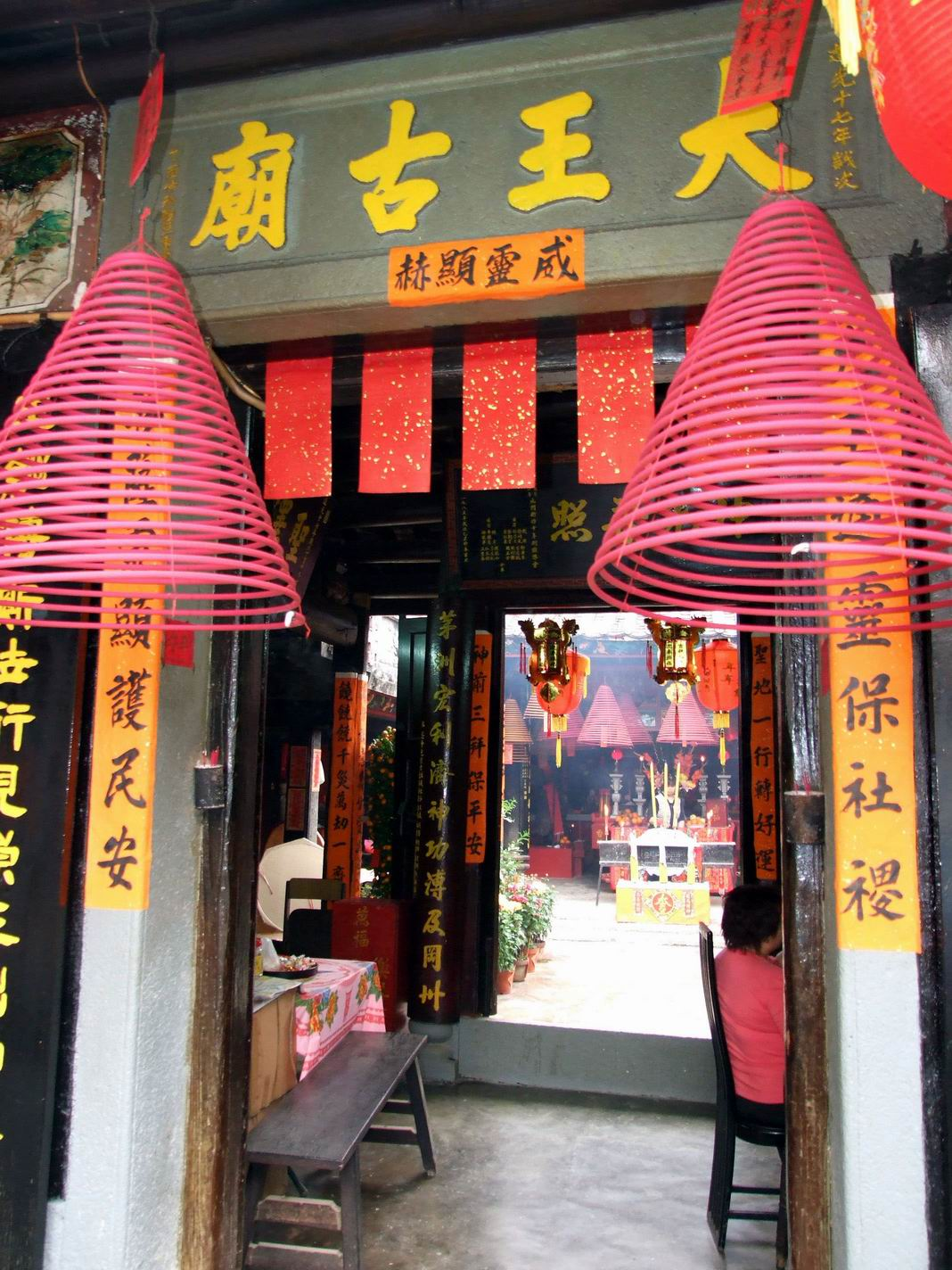
Tai Wong Temple in Cheung Shing Street.

The Tung Tau alliance (東頭約) or "Joint Meeting Group of Seven Villages" is an alliance of seven villages: Nam Pin Wai, Tung Tau Tsuen, Tsoi Uk Tsuen, Ying Lung Wai, Shan Pui Tsuen, Wong Uk Tsuen and Tai Wai Tsuen. The Yi Shing Temple in Wong Uk Tsuen (see below) is an alliance temple of the Tung Tau Alliance.

== Features ==
Cheung Shing Street (長盛街) was one of the busiest streets of the market. It separates Nam Pin Wai and Sai Pin Wai. Two other notable streets, Lee Yick Street (利益街) and Wine Street (酒街) connect with Cheung Shing Street. The three streets formed the centre of the market.

Nam Mun Hau (南門口; 'Mouth of the Southern Gate') is a built-up area located at the south of Cheung Shing Street, next to the former southern gate (Nam Mun; 南門). It was at the bank of a branch of the Shan Pui River, where boats anchored for the market-goers to do trading at the market. Several shops were located there.

=== Temples ===
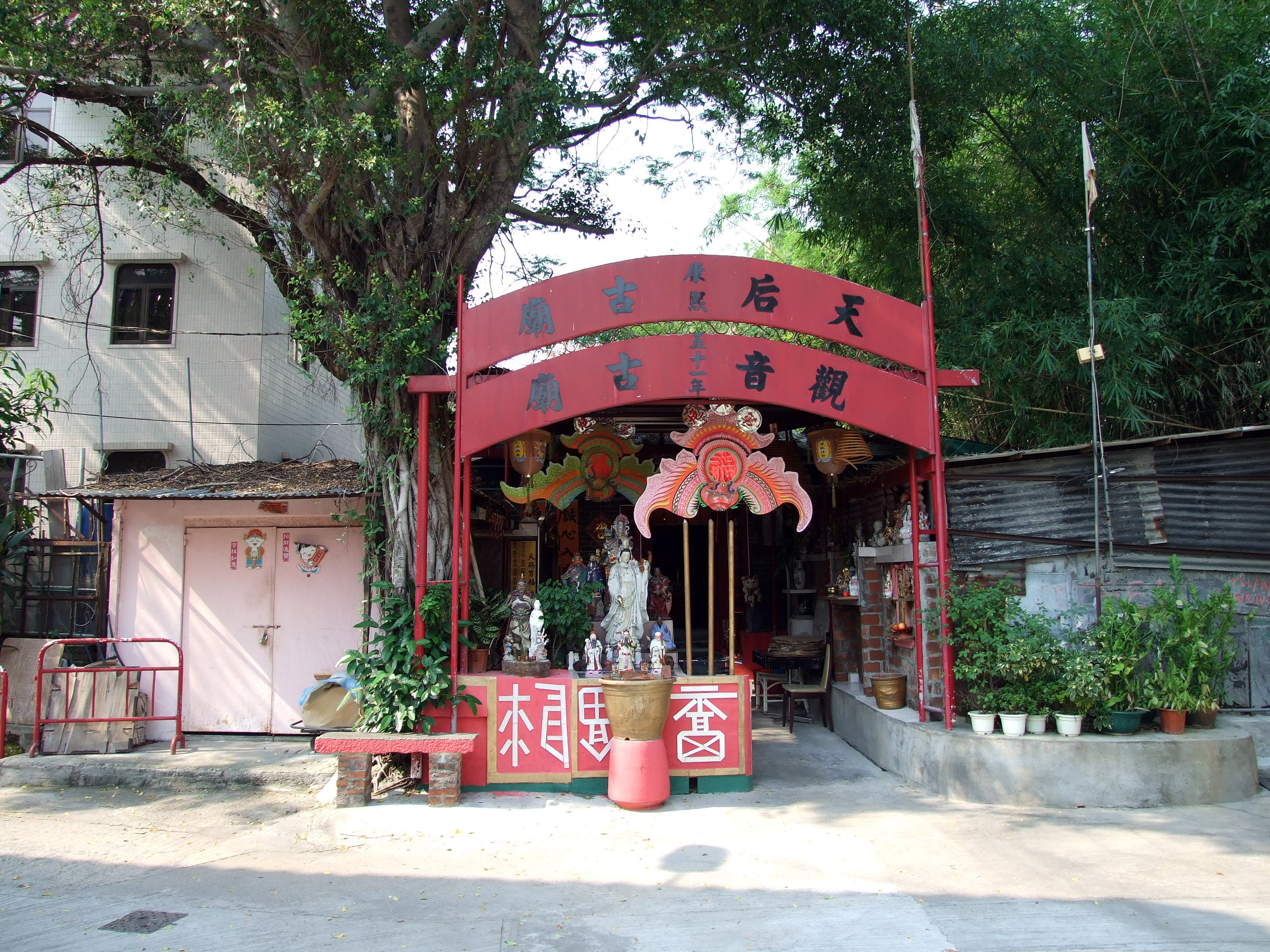
Front of the Kwun Yam and Tin Hau Temples in Tung Tau Tsuen.

Tai Wong Temple (大王古廟), a Grade I Historic Building, in Cheung Shing Street. Probably built between 1662–1722. It is the main temple of Nam Pin Wai as well as Yuen Long Kau Hui. It was built for the worship of Hung Shing and Yeung Hau. Other than for worship, the temple was a venue for solving disputes and discussing market affairs among the villagers. It also once served as a yamen and the officials lived there.

Yuen Kwan Yi Tai Temple (玄關二帝廟), a Grade I Historic Building probably built in 1714 in Cheung Shing Street. Commonly known as Pak Tai Temple, it is dedicated to Yuen Tai/Pak Tai and Kwan Tai. The temple functions as an ancestral hall and a temple of Sai Pin Wai. Village meetings are also held there.

Kwun Yam Temple (觀音古廟), a Grade II Historic Building in Tung Tau Tsuen. It is believed to have been built in 1712. It is connected with the Tin Hau Temple in the front and they are considered as one complex. Two statues of Heng and Ha Generals stand in front of the Kwun Yam altar as her guards. On the left bay is a statue of the God of Wealth (財帛星君) for worship.

Yi Shing Temple (二聖宮), in Wong Uk Tsuen, conventionally called Tai Wong Temple. It is mainly for the worship of Hung Shing and Yeung Hau deities. While its construction year cannot be verified, a renovation was carried out in 1924. It still acts as an alliance temple of the Tung Tau Alliance formed by the seven villages around Tai Wai Tsuen. In the old days, the temple operated a credit society serving the alliance villages.

=== Other buildings ===
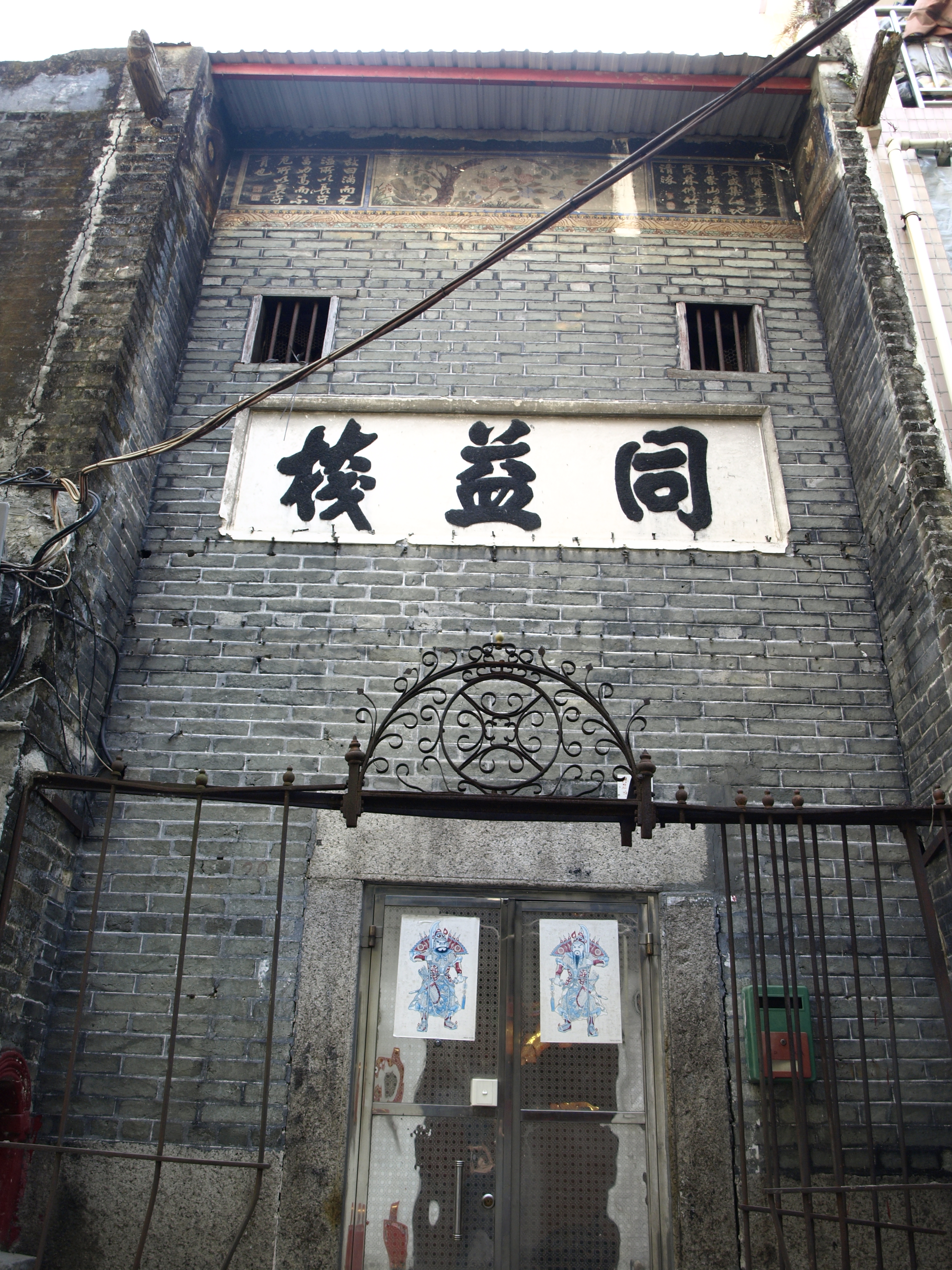
Tung Yick Store

Chun Yuen Ngat (晉源押), a former pawnshop, at No. 72 Cheung Shing Street. Founded by Tang Lim-ming (鄧廉明) of the Tang Clan, and father of Tang Pui-king (鄧佩瓊), the pawnshop was originally located at Lee Yick Street and was moved to the present site in the 1910s. It operated until WWII, when the business of the market declined.

Tung Yick Store (同益棧), Nos. 20 A & 21 Lee Yick Street, a former inn providing accommodation to traveling merchants from other villages. The exact year of its construction is not known, but it is believed that it had existed before 1899.

Entrance Gate of Tai Wai Tsuen, originally built around the early 16th century, reconstructed in 1911. There is an Earth God niche inside the Entrance Gate building.

Lam Ancestral Hall (林氏家祠), at No. 157 Shan Pui Tsuen, was probably built in the 19th century. The building was used as the classrooms of a school for teaching village children in the 1930s-1960s, and as classrooms of a kindergarten in 1967-1968.

Shophouses (tong-lau) of the early 20th century can be found at Nam Mun Hau (Nos. 33-35) and in Lee Yick Street (No. 3a).

== Education ==
Yuen Long Kau Hui is in Primary One Admission (POA) School Net 74. Within the school net are multiple aided schools (operated independently but funded with government money) and one government school: Yuen Long Government Primary School (元朗官立小學).

== Transportation ==
The area is served by the Yuen Long MTR station Exit A/B.

== See also ==
- Tai Po Kau Hui
- Tuen Mun Kau Hui
