= Tung Tau Tsuen (Yuen Long Kau Hui) =

Village in Yuen Long, Hong Kong

Coordinates: 22.4479°N 114.03532°E

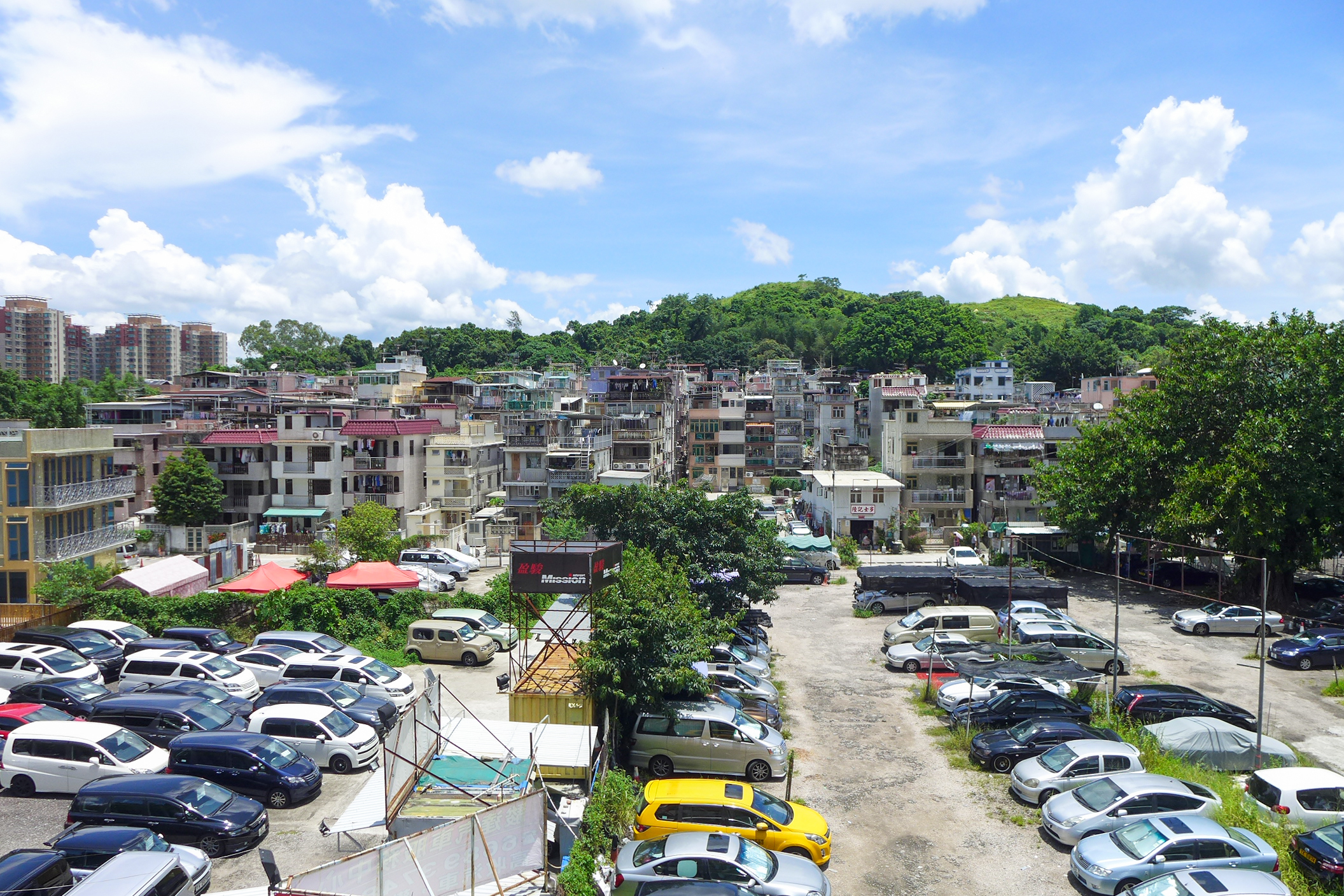
Tung Tau Tsuen in July 2017.

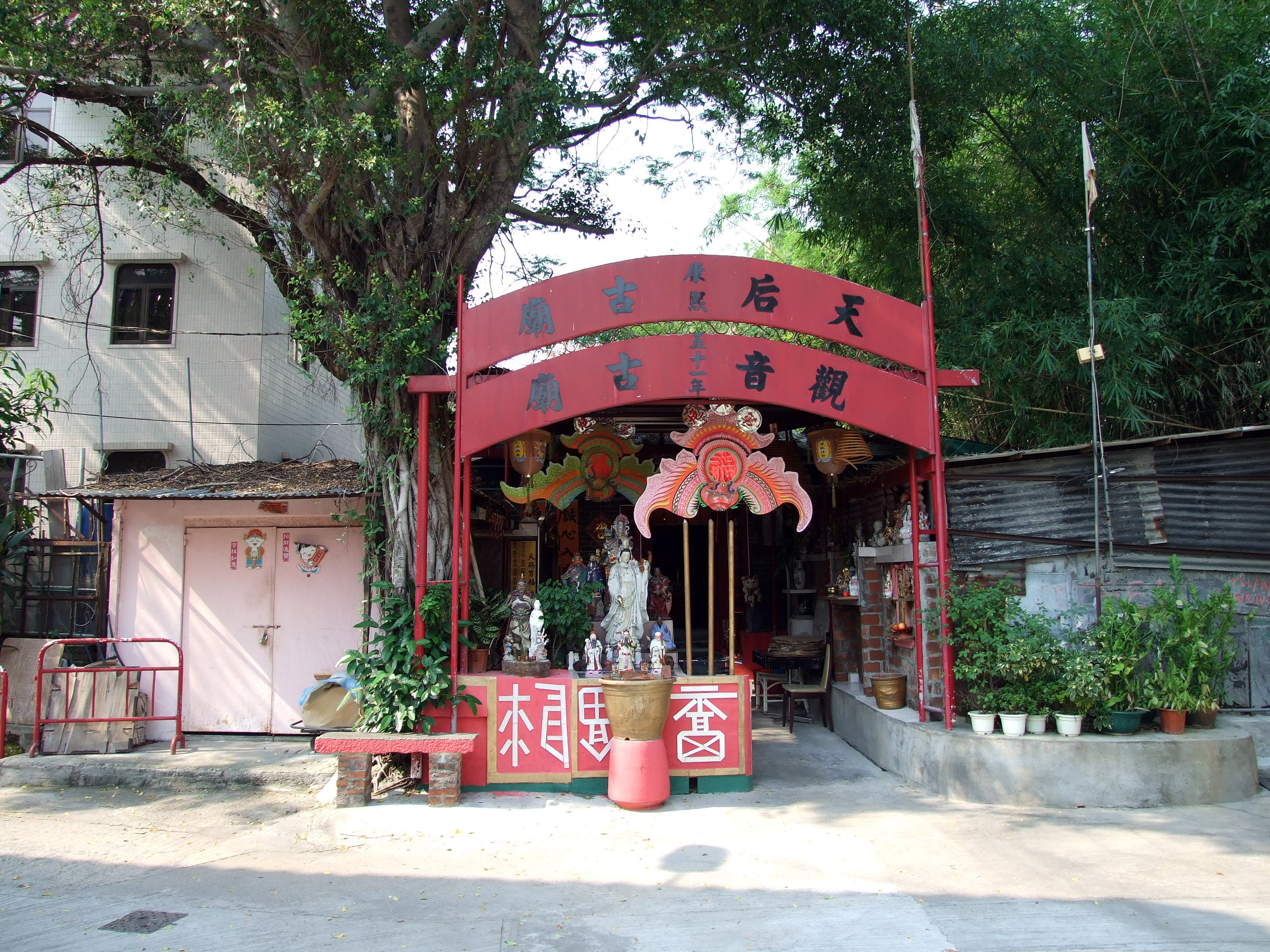
Front of the Kwun Yam and Tin Hau Temples in Tung Tau Tsuen in June 2009.

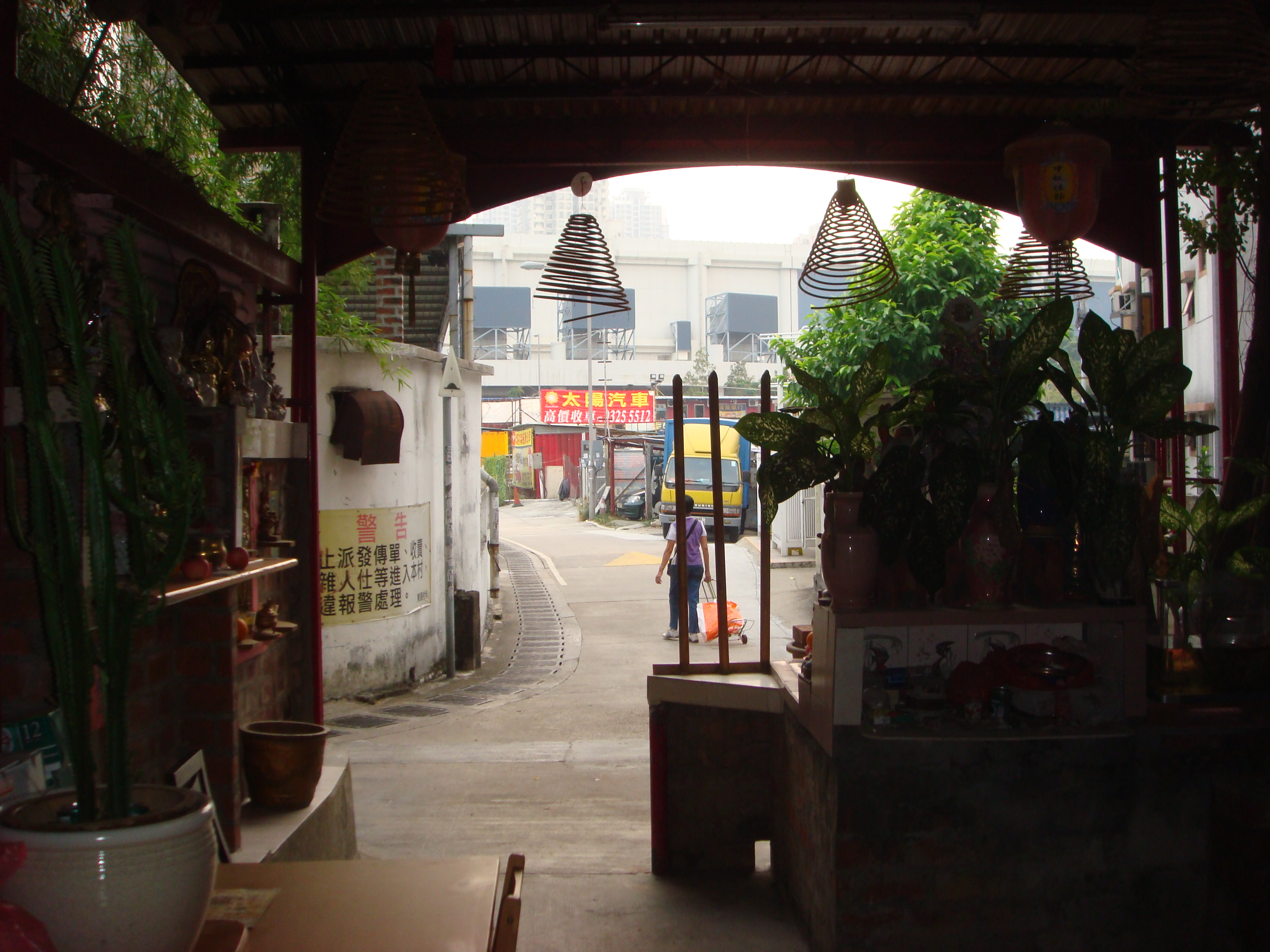
View from the Tin Hau Temple in Tung Tau Tsuen.

Tung Tau Tsuen (Chinese: 東頭村) is a village in the Yuen Long Kau Hui area of Yuen Long District, Hong Kong.

== Administration ==
Tung Tau Tsuen is a recognized village under the New Territories Small House Policy.

== History ==
Tung Tau Tsuen is so called because it is located in the east of the old Yuen Long Kau Hui market. It was established in the 17th century by the members of several clans, the Chans (陳) being the major one, and others being the Loks (駱) and the Lis (李) from Dongguan. The village was originally called Chan Lok Li Tsuen (陳駱李村).

Tung Tau Tsuen is part of the Tung Tau alliance (東頭約) or "Joint Meeting Group of Seven Villages", together with Nam Pin Wai, Choi Uk Tsuen, Ying Lung Wai, Shan Pui Tsuen, Wong Uk Tsuen and Tai Wai Tsuen. The Yi Shing Temple in Wong Uk Tsuen is an alliance temple of the Tung Tau Alliance.

Ss. Peter and Paul Church, located at No. 201 Castle Peak Road in Yuen Long, near Shui Pin Tsuen, was originally built in 1925 in Tung Tau Tsuen. It was relocated and rebuilt on the present Castle Peak Road site in 1958.
