= Shap Pat Heung North (constituency) =

Hong Kong constituency

- 十八鄉北
- Elected constituency for the Yuen Long District Council
- Boundary of Shap Pat Heung North in Yuen Long District
- District: Yuen Long
- Legislative Council constituency: New Territories North West
- Population: 14,251 (2019)
- Electorate: 4,960 (2019)

Current constituency
- Created: 2019
- Number of members: One
- Member: Shum Ho-kit (Nonpartisan)
- Created from: Shap Pat Heung East

Shap Pat Heung North (Chinese: 十八鄉北) is one of the 39 constituencies in the Yuen Long District.

Created for the 2019 District Council elections, the constituency returns one district councillor to the Yuen Long District Council, with an election every four years.

Shap Pat Heung North loosely covers northern part of Shap Pat Heung in Yuen Long. It has projected population of 14,251.

== Councillors represented ==
Election	Member	Party
2019	Shum Ho-kit	Nonpartisan

== Election results ==
=== 2010s ===
Yuen Long District Council Election, 2019: Shap Pat Heung North
Party	Candidate	Votes	%	±%
Nonpartisan	Shum Ho-kit	1,896	54.20	
Action 18	Adrian Lau Chun-yu	1,602	45.80	
Majority		294	8.40	
Turnout		3,499	70.62	
Nonpartisan win (new seat)				
