= Ko Tin Hom =

Coordinates: 22.4454058°N 114.1388797°E

Ko Tin Hom (Chinese: 高田墈) is a village in Lam Tsuen, Tai Po District, Hong Kong.

== Status recognition ==
Ko Tin Hom is a recognised village under the New Territories Small House Policy.

== See also ==
- Chuen Shui Tseng, Lung A Pai and Tin Liu Ha, nearby villages
