= Fong Ma Po =

Village in Lam Tsuen, Tai Po District, Hong Kong

Coordinates: 22.456555°N 114.14134°E

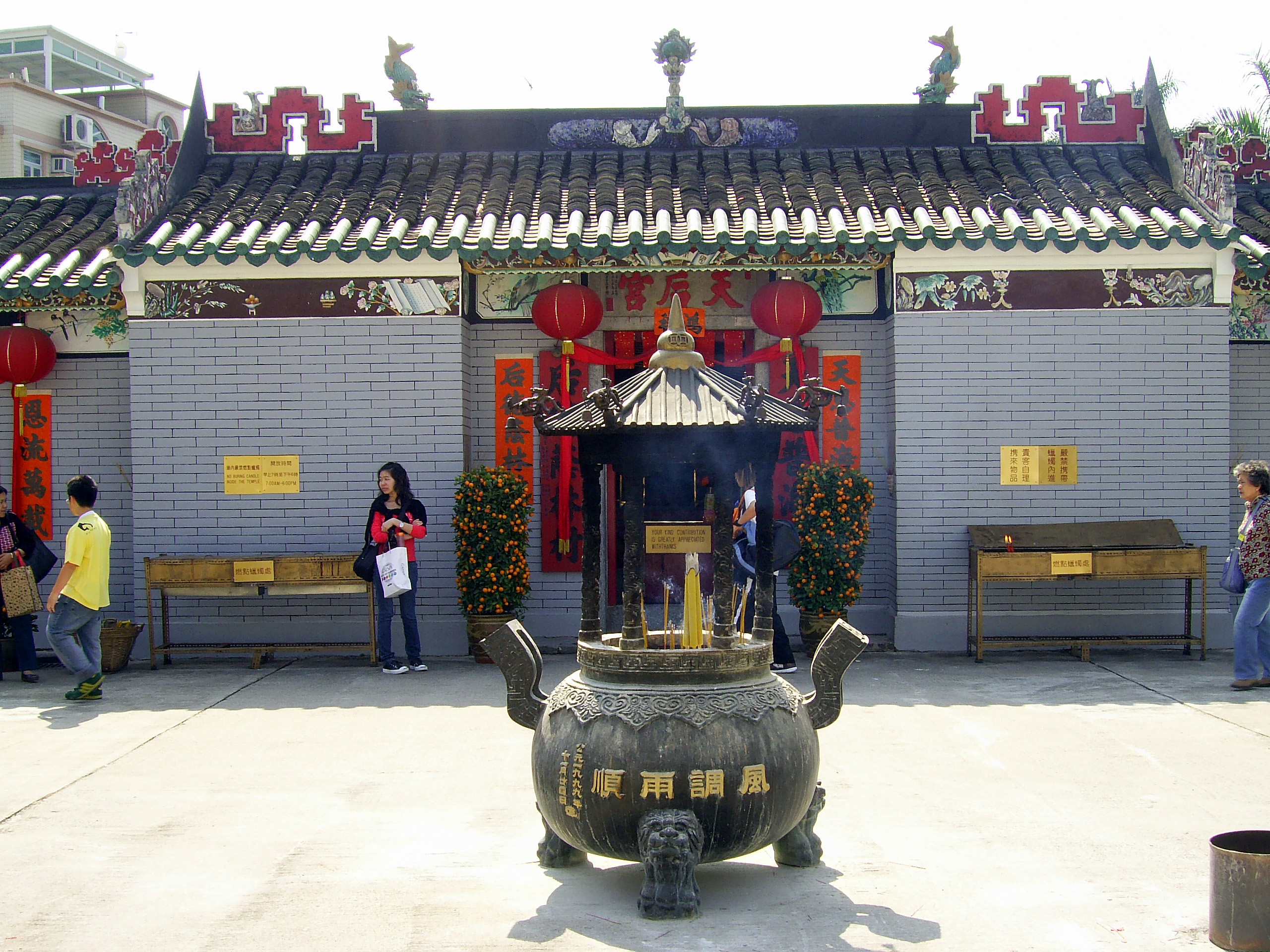
Lam Tsuen Tin Hau Temple in Fong Ma Po.

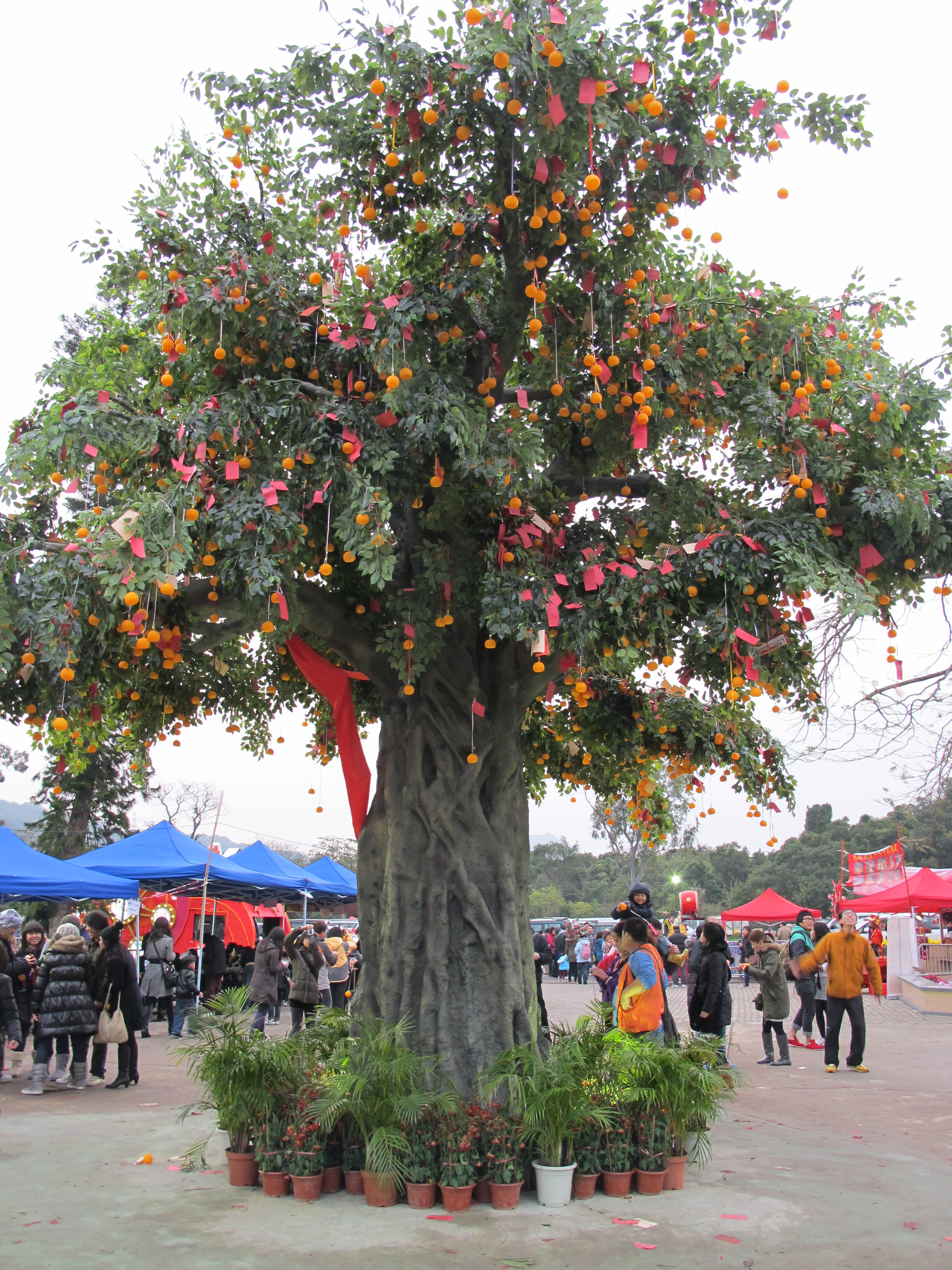
Lam Tsuen wishing tree in Fong Ma Po.

Fong Ma Po (Chinese: 放馬莆; lit. 'place for grazing horses') is a village in Lam Tsuen, Tai Po District, Hong Kong.

Fong Ma Po is a Punti village, where a Tin Hau Temple, the Lam Tsuen wishing trees and the former Lam Tsuen Public School are located.

== Recognised status ==
Fong Ma Po is a recognised village under the New Territories Small House Policy.

== History ==
At the time of the 1911 census, the population of Fong Ma Po was 32. The number of males was 17.

== Geography ==
Adjacent villages:

- Hang Ha Po, to the northeast
- San Uk Pai, to the east, across Lam Kam Road (林錦公路)
- Chung Uk Tsuen, to the south
- San Uk Tsai, to the southwest
