= San Uk Pai =

Village in Lam Tsuen, Tai Po District, Hong Kong

Coordinates: 22.456435°N 114.143567°E

San Uk Pai (Chinese: 新屋排) is a village in Lam Tsuen, Tai Po District, Hong Kong.

== Administration ==
San Uk Pai is a recognized village under the New Territories Small House Policy.

== History ==
At the time of the 1911 census, the population of San Uk Pai was 9. The number of males was 3.

== Geography ==
Adjacent villages:

- Hang Ha Po, to the north
- Fong Ma Po, to the west, across Lam Kam Road (林錦公路)
