= Sheshan (disambiguation) =

Sheshan (Chinese: 佘山) is a pair of hills in western Shanghai, China.

Sheshan may also refer to:

- Sheshan Island, an island near Shanghai, China
- Sheshan Basilica on West Sheshan
- Sheshan Golf Club near Sheshan
- Sheshan Station on Shanghai's Subway Line 9, near Sheshan
- Sheshan, a minor biblical figure

Also:

- She Shan Tsuen, a village in Hong Kong
