= Ma Po Mei =

Village of Hong Kong

Coordinates: 22.44538°N 114.129527°E

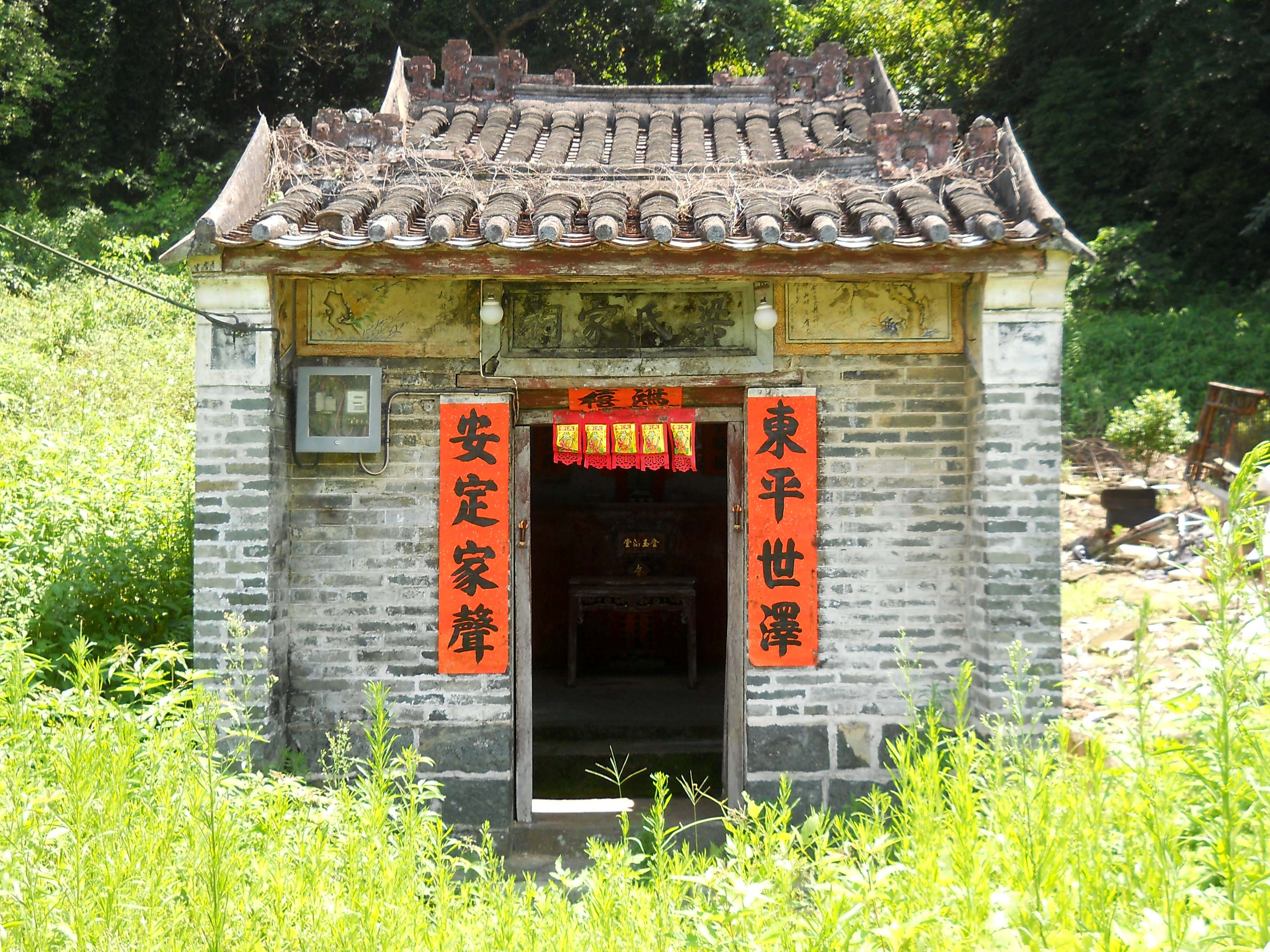
Leung Ancestral Hall in Ma Po Mei.

Ma Po Mei (Chinese: 麻布尾) is a village in Lam Tsuen, Tai Po District, Hong Kong.

== Administration ==
Ma Po Mei is a recognized village under the New Territories Small House Policy.
