= Tin Liu Ha =

Village in Hong Kong

Coordinates: 22.445943°N 114.141731°E

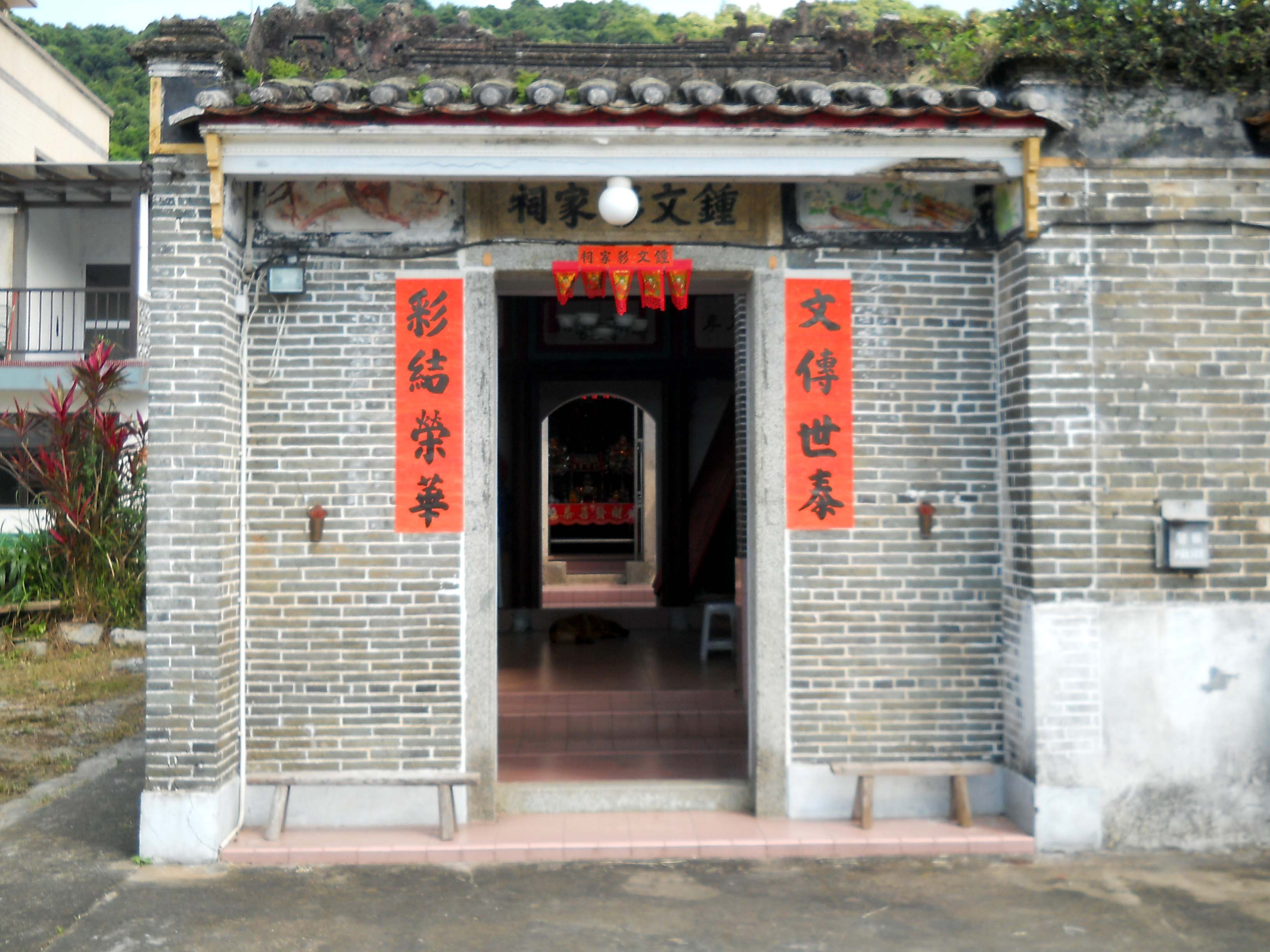
Man Tsoi Chung Ancestral Hall in Ha Tin Liu Ha.

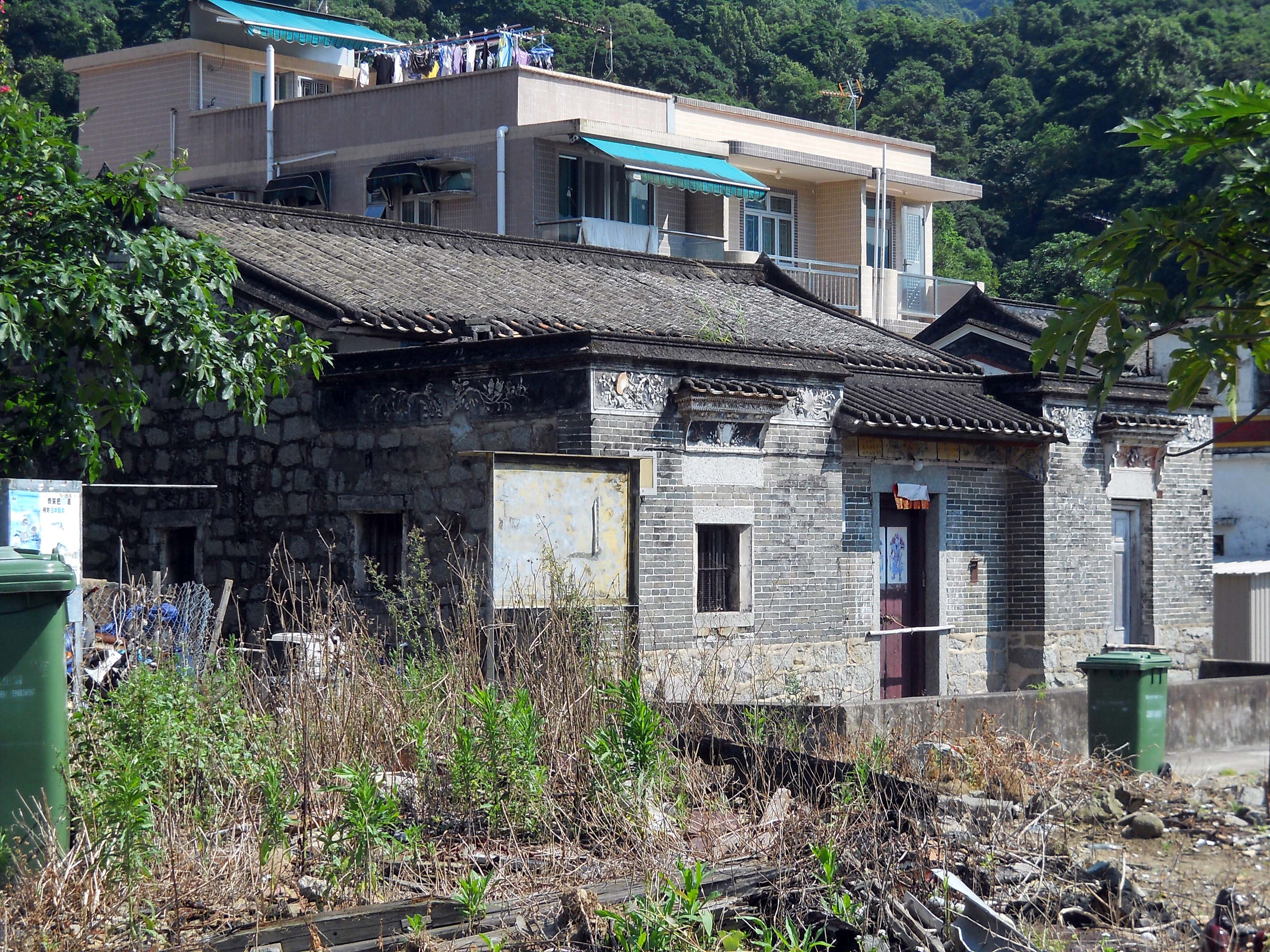
Nos. 24B-24D in Ha Tin Liu Ha.

Tin Liu Ha (Chinese: 田寮下) is a village in Lam Tsuen, Tai Po District, Hong Kong. It comprises the two hamlets of Ha Tin Liu Ha (下田寮下; 'Lower Tin Liu Ha') and Sheung Tin Liu Ha (上田寮下; 'Upper Tin Liu Ha').

== Administration ==
Tin Liu Ha is a recognized village under the New Territories Small House Policy.

== History ==
At the time of the 1911 census, the population of Tin Liu Ha was 177. The number of males was 74.

== See also ==
- Ko Tin Hom, a nearby village
