= Tong Sheung Tsuen =

Village in Hong Kong

Coordinates: 22.452692°N 114.138769°E

Tong Sheung Tsuen (Chinese: 塘上村) is a village in Lam Tsuen, Tai Po District, Hong Kong.

== Administration ==
Tong Sheung Tsuen is a recognized village under the New Territories Small House Policy.

== History ==
At the time of the 1911 census, the population of Tong Sheung Tsuen was 131. The number of males was 46.
