= Tai Om Shan =

Village in Hong Kong

Coordinates: 22.43643°N 114.13495°E

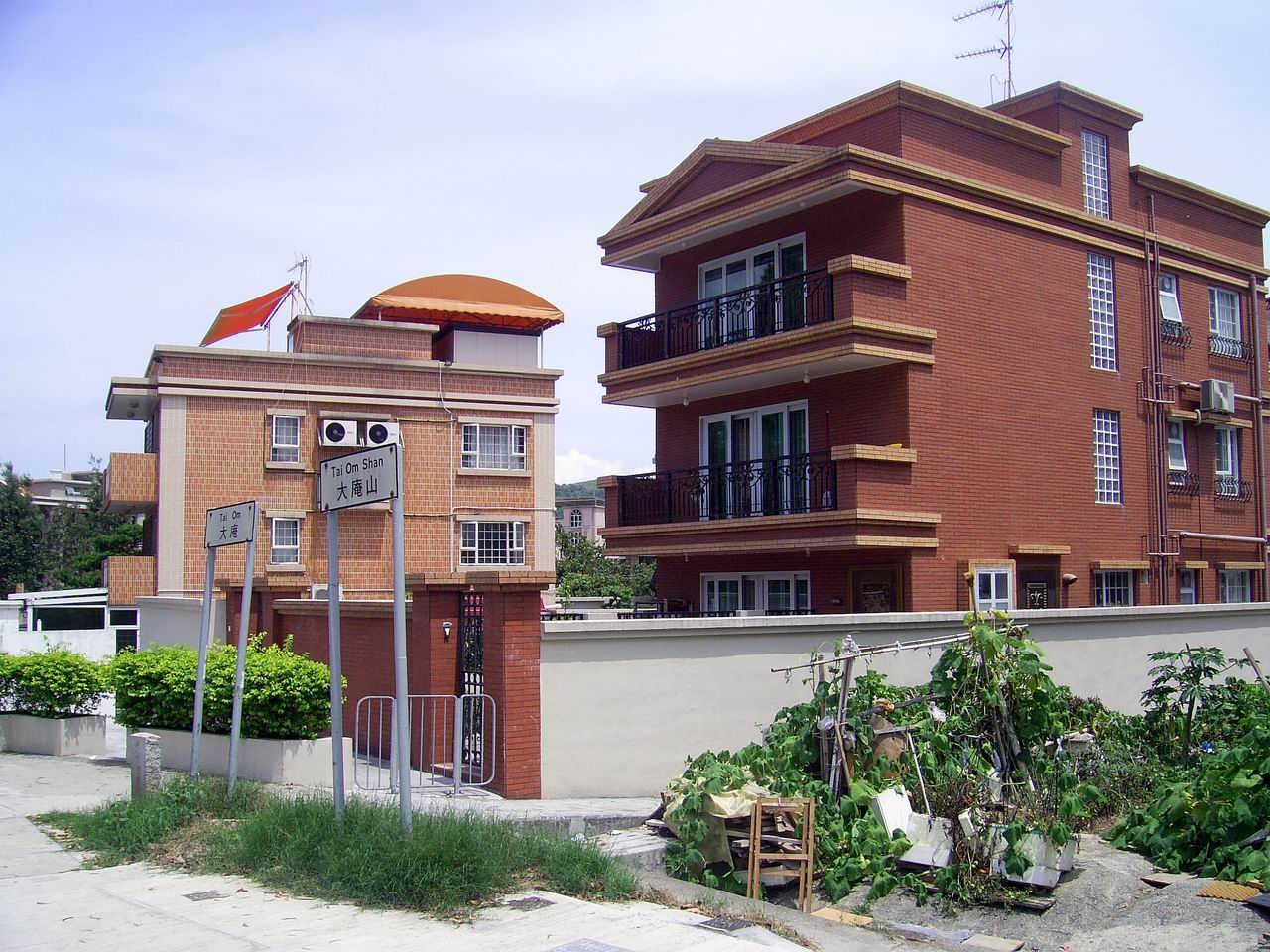
Tai Om Shan in April 2008.

Tai Om Shan (Chinese: 大菴山; Cantonese Yale: daaih ām shāan) is a village in Lam Tsuen, Tai Po District, Hong Kong.

== Recognised status ==
Tai Om Shan is a recognised village under the New Territories Small House Policy.

== History ==
At the time of the 1911 census, the population of Tai Om Shan was 72. The number of males was 30.
