= Tai Yeung Che =

Coordinates: 22.446246°N 114.12795°E

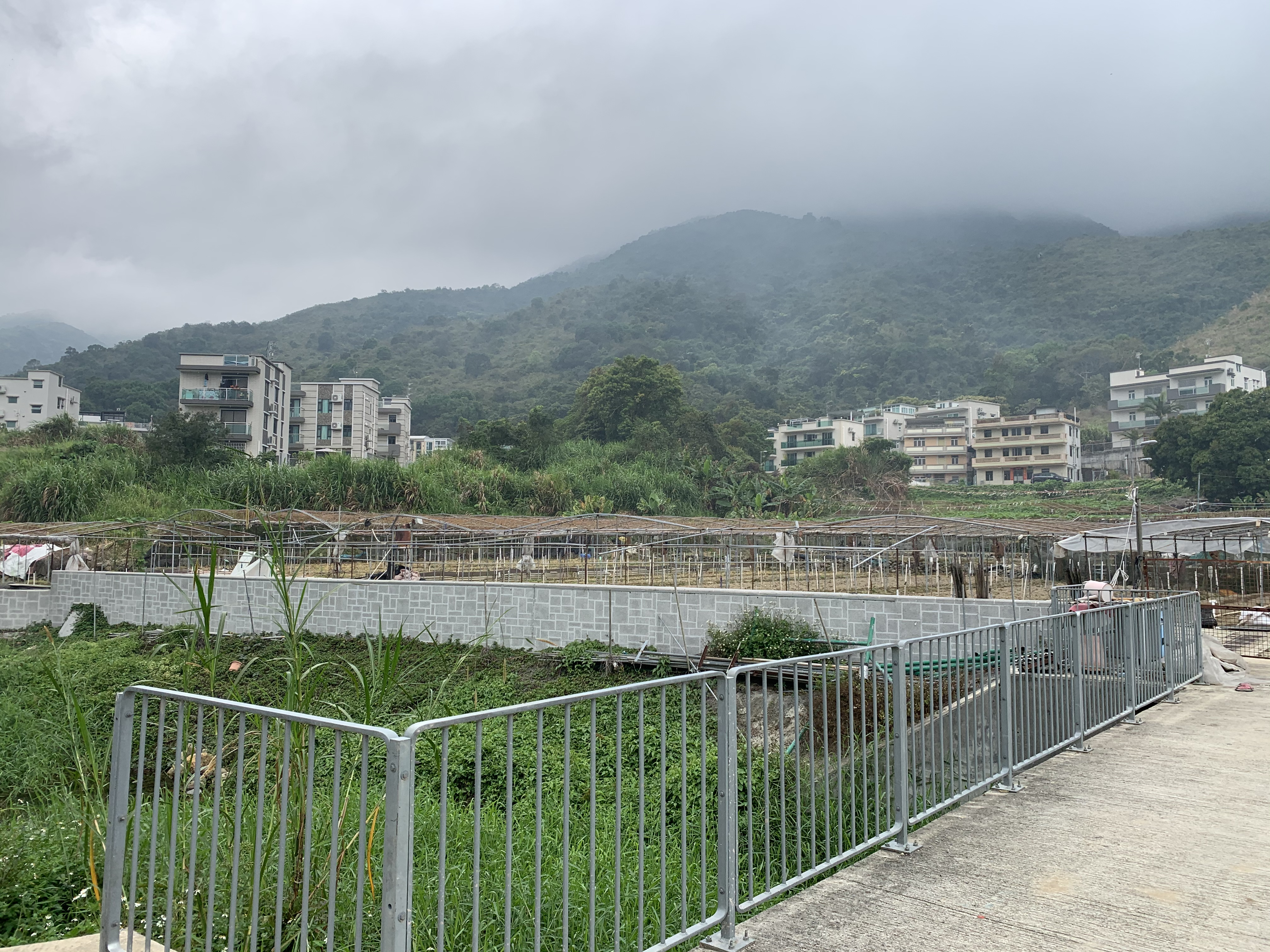
Lam Tsuen River in Tai Yeung Che.

Tai Yeung Che (Chinese: 大陽輋) is a village in Lam Tsuen, Tai Po District, Hong Kong.
