= Chai Kek =

Village in Hong Kong

Coordinates: 22.441285°N 114.129218°E

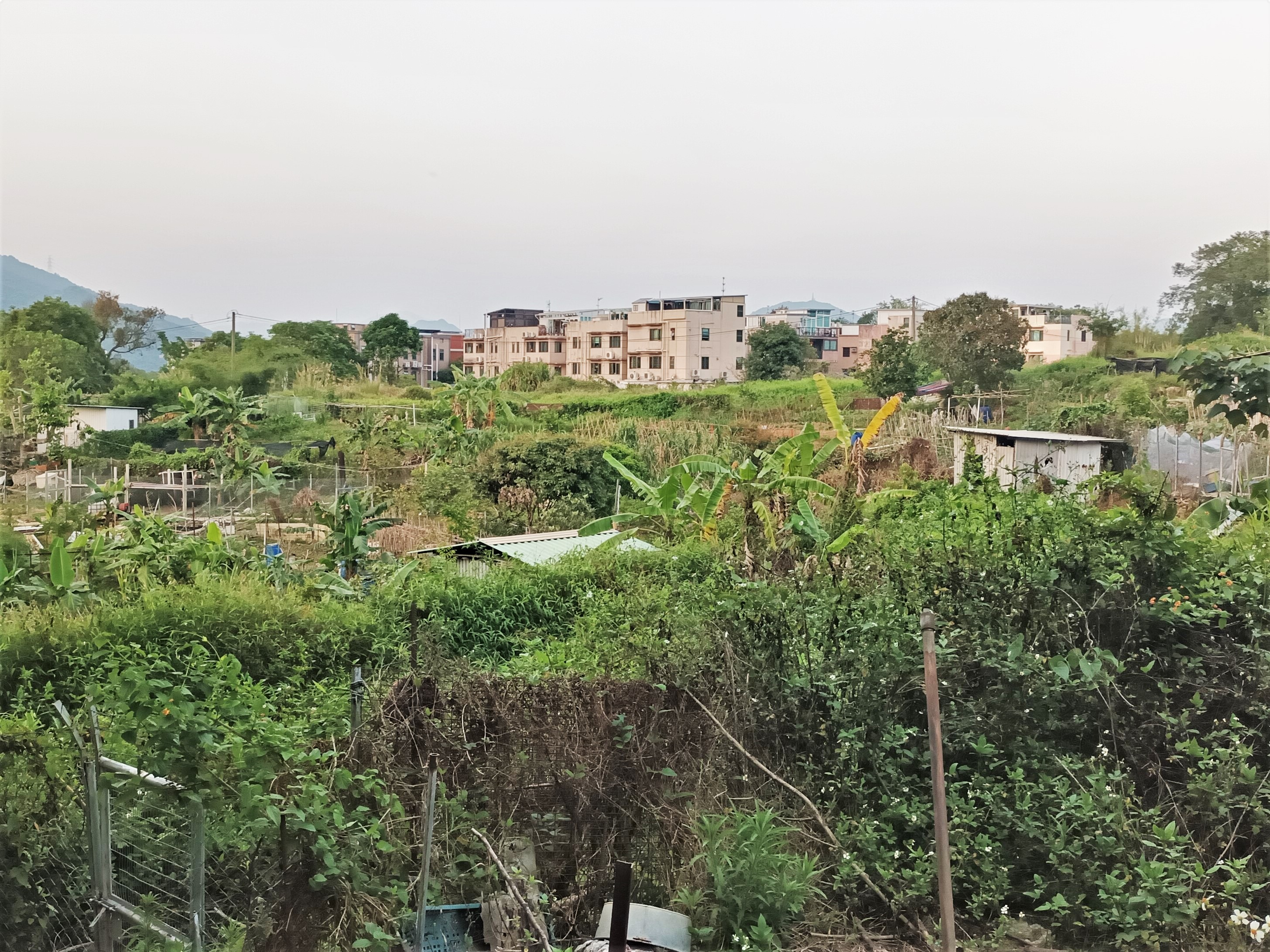
Distant view of Chai Kek, viewed from Ng Tung Chai, in the south.

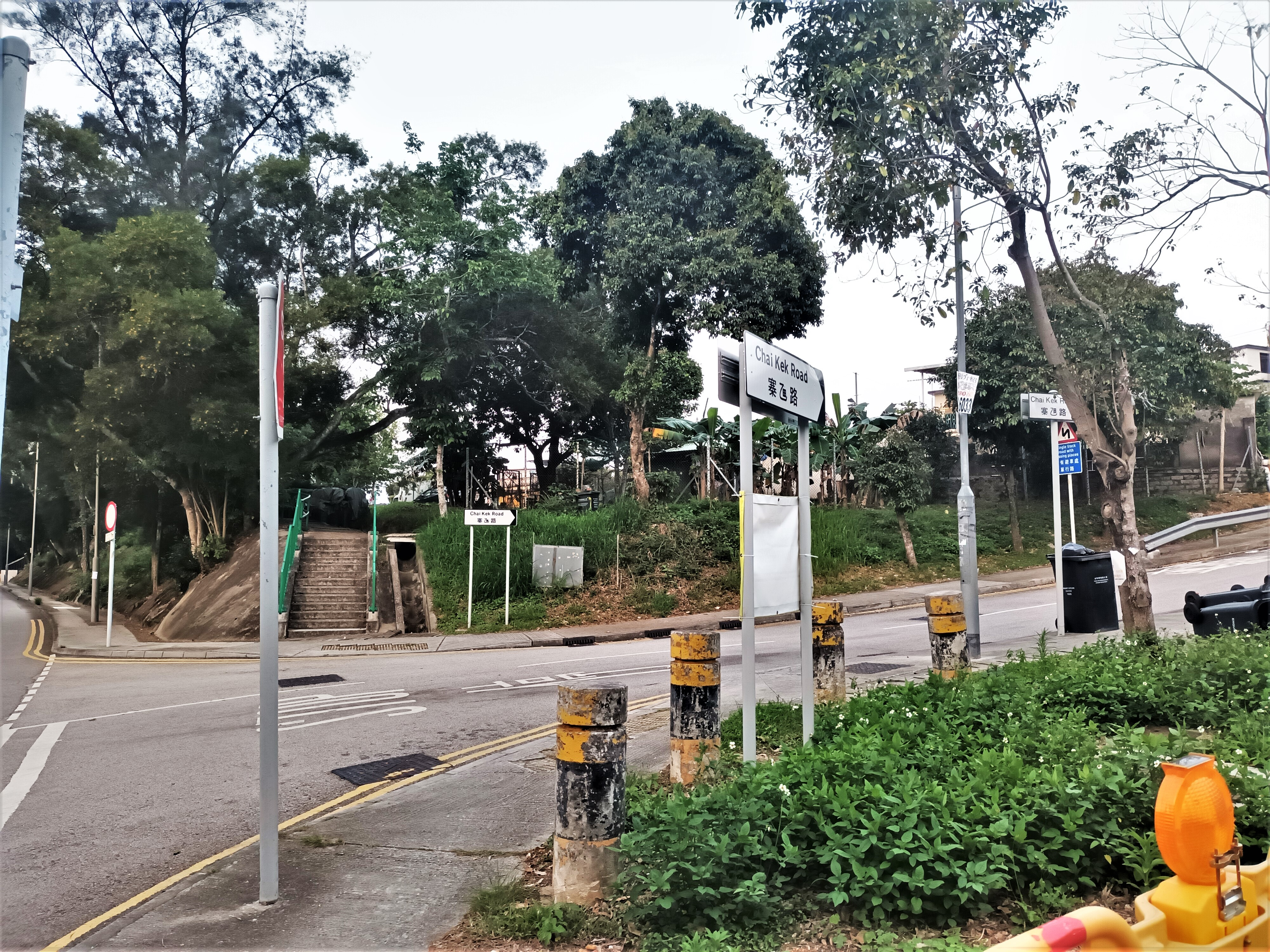
Intersection of Lam Kam Road and Chai Kek Road, leading to Chai Kek.

Chai Kek (Chinese: 寨乪) is a village in Lam Tsuen, Tai Po District, Hong Kong.

== Administration ==
Chai Kek is a recognized village under the New Territories Small House Policy.

== History ==
At the time of the 1911 census, the population of Tsai Kek was 129. The number of males was 51.

In December 2023, the village's former representative, Herman Chung He-man, was found murdered in the village; his wife was arrested.
