= Lam Tsuen wishing trees =

Popular shrine in Hong Kong

Coordinates: 22.4562°N 114.1430°E

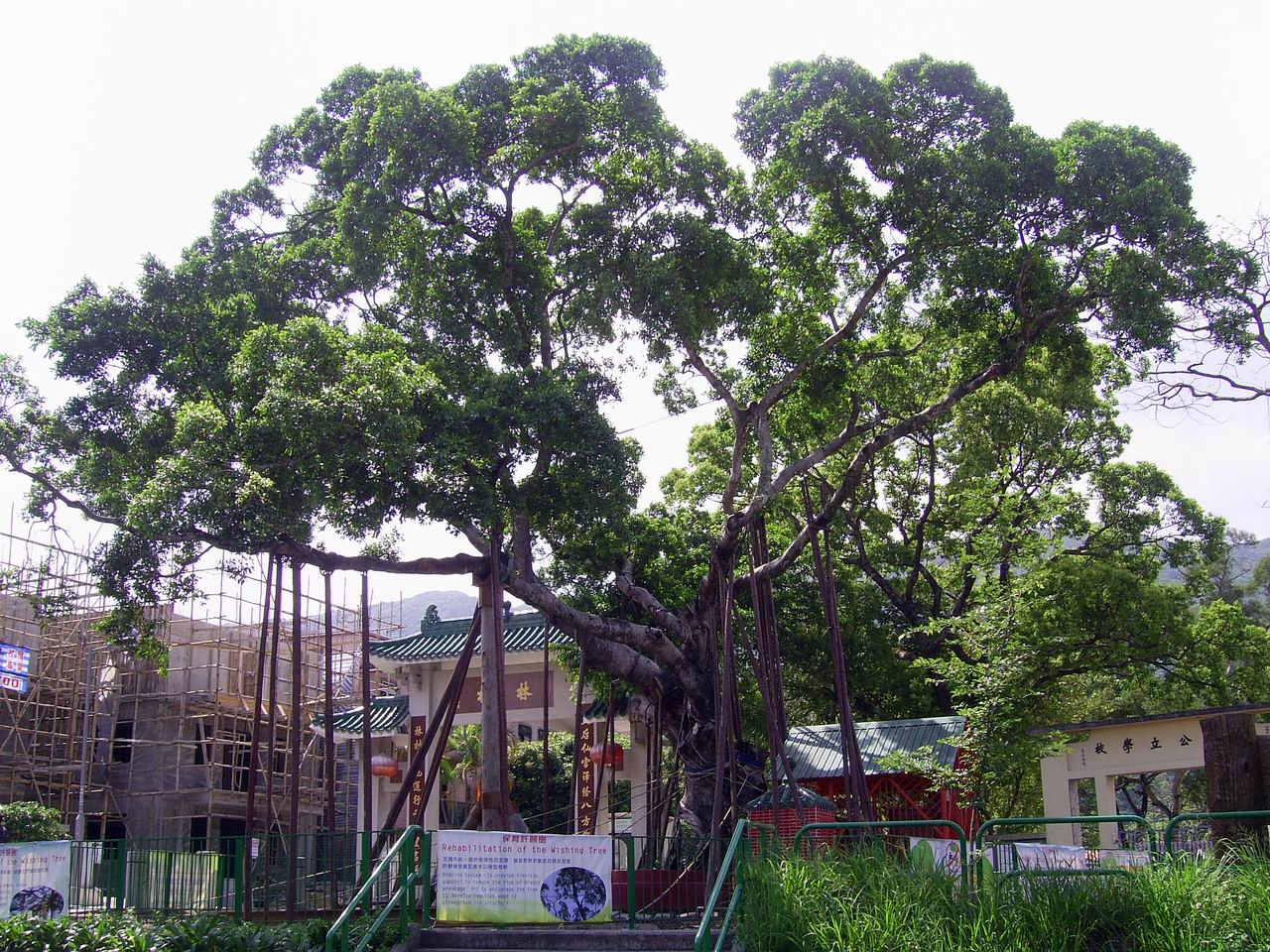
One of the two Lam Tsuen Wishing Trees in 2008.

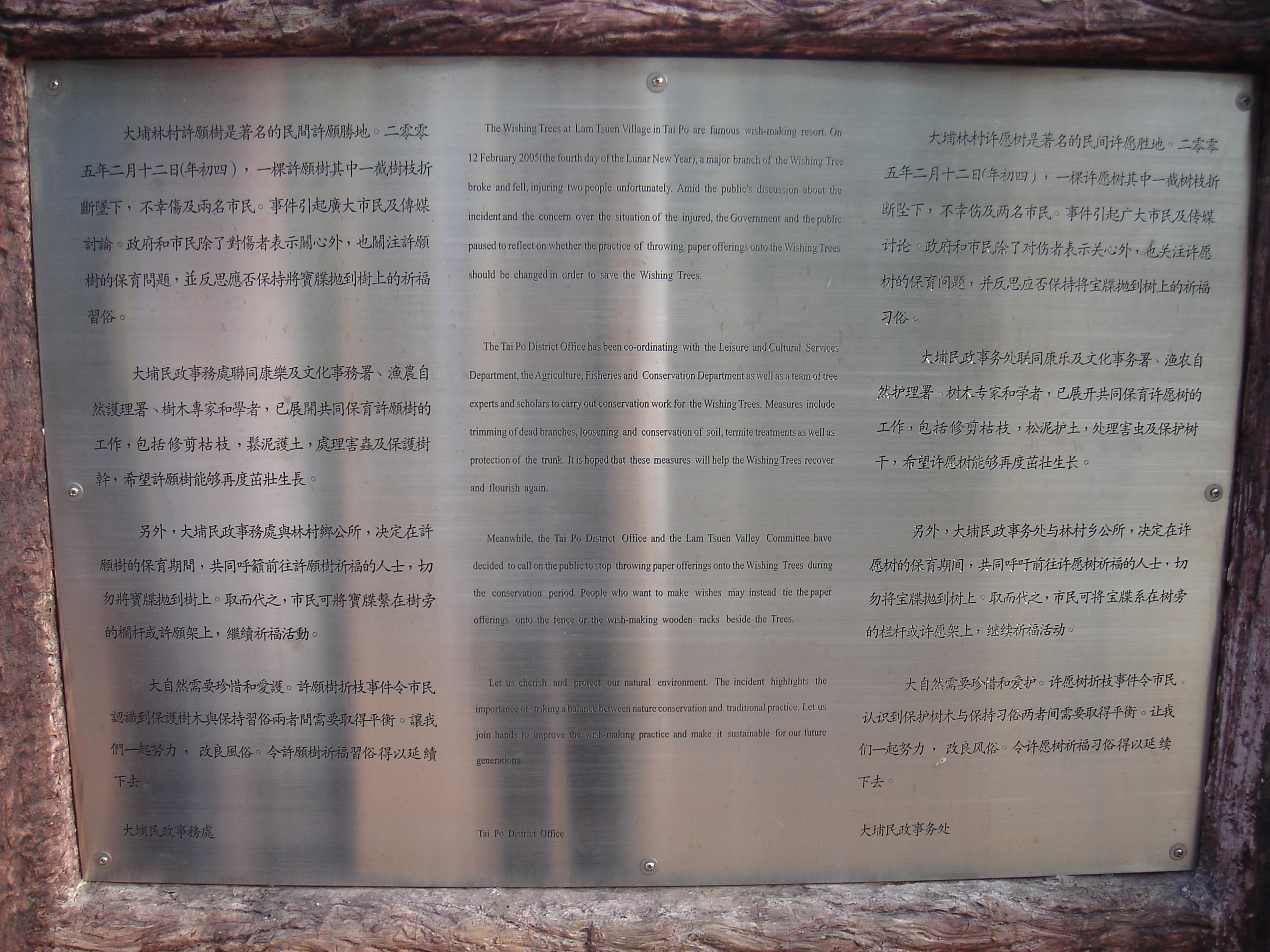
Plaque describing the incident and conservation plan.

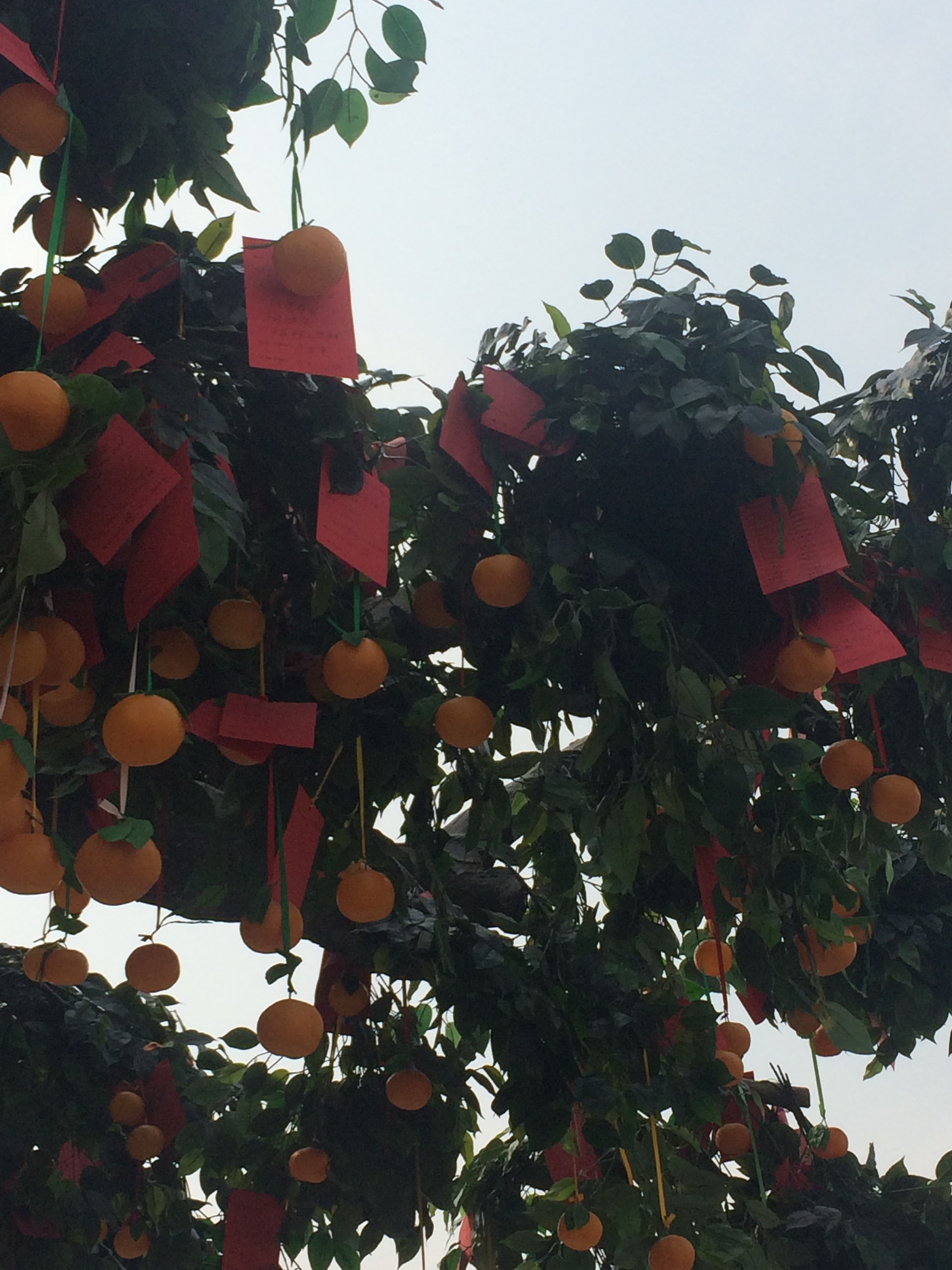
Lam Tsuen Wishing Tree

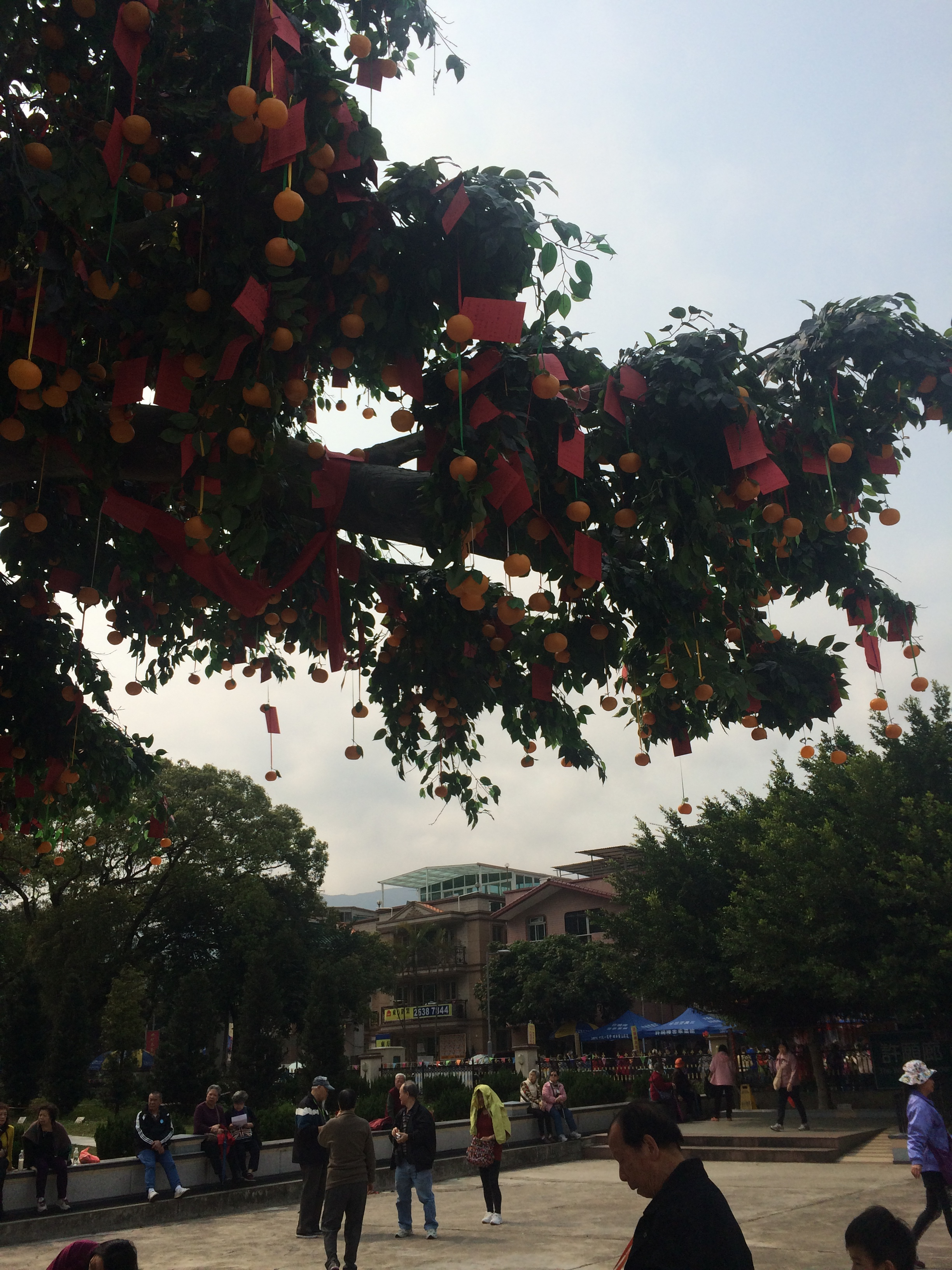
Lam Tsuen Wishing Trees

The Lam Tsuen Wishing Trees (Chinese: 林村許願樹; Jyutping: lam4 cyun1 heoi2 jyun6 syu6) are a popular shrine in Hong Kong located near the Tin Hau Temple in Fong Ma Po Village, Lam Tsuen. The temple was built around 1768 or 1771, during the reign of the Qianlong Emperor in the Qing dynasty (1644–1912).

The two banyan trees are frequented by tourists and locals during the Lunar New Year. Previously, they burnt joss sticks, wrote their wishes on joss paper tied to an orange, then threw them up to hang in these trees. It was believed that if the paper successfully hung onto one of the tree branches, these wishes would come true.

This practice was discouraged by the authorities after 12 February 2005, when one of the branches gave way and injured two people. Instead, wooden racks are set up in place for joss papers to be hung while a period of conservation is imposed to help these trees recover and flourish.

The Hong Kong Morris, a morris dancing team based in Hong Kong, dances at the Wishing Tree on 1 May each year to celebrate the arrival of summer.

== History ==
Lam Tsuen has been a residential area since the Song dynasty, which was about 700 years ago. The commencement of residence was believed to be in 1287 A.D. Tin Hau Temple, which the wishing trees locate aside, was built during the Qianlong period in the Qing dynasty. It was used as the ‘highest administrative body’ in Lam Tsuen, responsible for policies and administration of the villages covered in Lam Tsuen. Luk Wo Tong was made a substitute of Tin Hau Temple in 1954 by the Lam Tsuen Valley Committee. Lam Tsuen wishing tree was an ordinary camphor tree where a tablet for enshrining and worshipping Pak Kung was placed. As years passed, the branches and leaves gradually withered and eventually it became a hollow tree. People started to believe that Lam Tsuen wishing tree was magical after a legend: a man whose son had had a slow learning progress made a wish to a hollow tree. After that, his son's academic performance has shown drastic improvement. This was spread to other people and an influx of them flocking to make their wishes to the hollow tree occurred. That hollow tree therefore became renowned.

== Ways of throwing wishes onto the tree ==
There are four wishing trees in Lam Tsuen. Different trees symbolise various wishes. The first tree prays for career, academic and wealth. The second tree is for marriage and pregnancy. For the third tree, it states anything can be prayed. Yet, the fourth tree is believed to be most special. It is a fake 25-foot wishing tree made of plastic. This plastic fake wishing tree allows worshippers to throw their wishes to the tree, called “Bao Die” in Chinese. A traditional "Bao Die" includes an orange and it ties with a red paper. Worshippers can write their name, date of birth and wishes on the yellow paper and throw it to the wishing tree. If you can successfully throw the "Bao die" and it hangs up on the tree or its branches, the myth said your wishes can come true. However, if it drops, the legend reckoned that your wishes are too greedy. But still, if the "wishes" drop, do not give up, try more and keep throwing until you make your wishes success.

== Festival ==
Lam Tsuen holds the Hong Kong Well-Wishing Festival found in 2011, is the local characteristic Chinese New Year celebration activity which attracts hundreds of thousands local citizens and tourists from all over the world to Lam Tsuen every year. Held every first and 15th of the first month in lunar calendar and locates in Village in Lam Tsuen in Tai Po, Lam Tsuen Wishing Tree Festival has become an activity in Chinese New Year. Various activities at the festival include throwing wishing placard, setting wishing lanterns to make wish, joining international float exhibition, shopping in food carnival and setting lantern light to celebrate new born babies. The festival is held by the collaboration with HKSAR government and Lam Tsuen. The reporters said that the festival attracted many local citizens and visitors to visit and enjoy a series of activities. Citizens can take the bus 64K and 64P at MTR Tai Po Market station and alight at Fong Ma Po. Also, they can take Minibus 25K and get off at Lam Tsuen Wishing Trees. Taking taxi at MTR Tai Wo station can also arrive Lam Tsuen.

== Accident ==
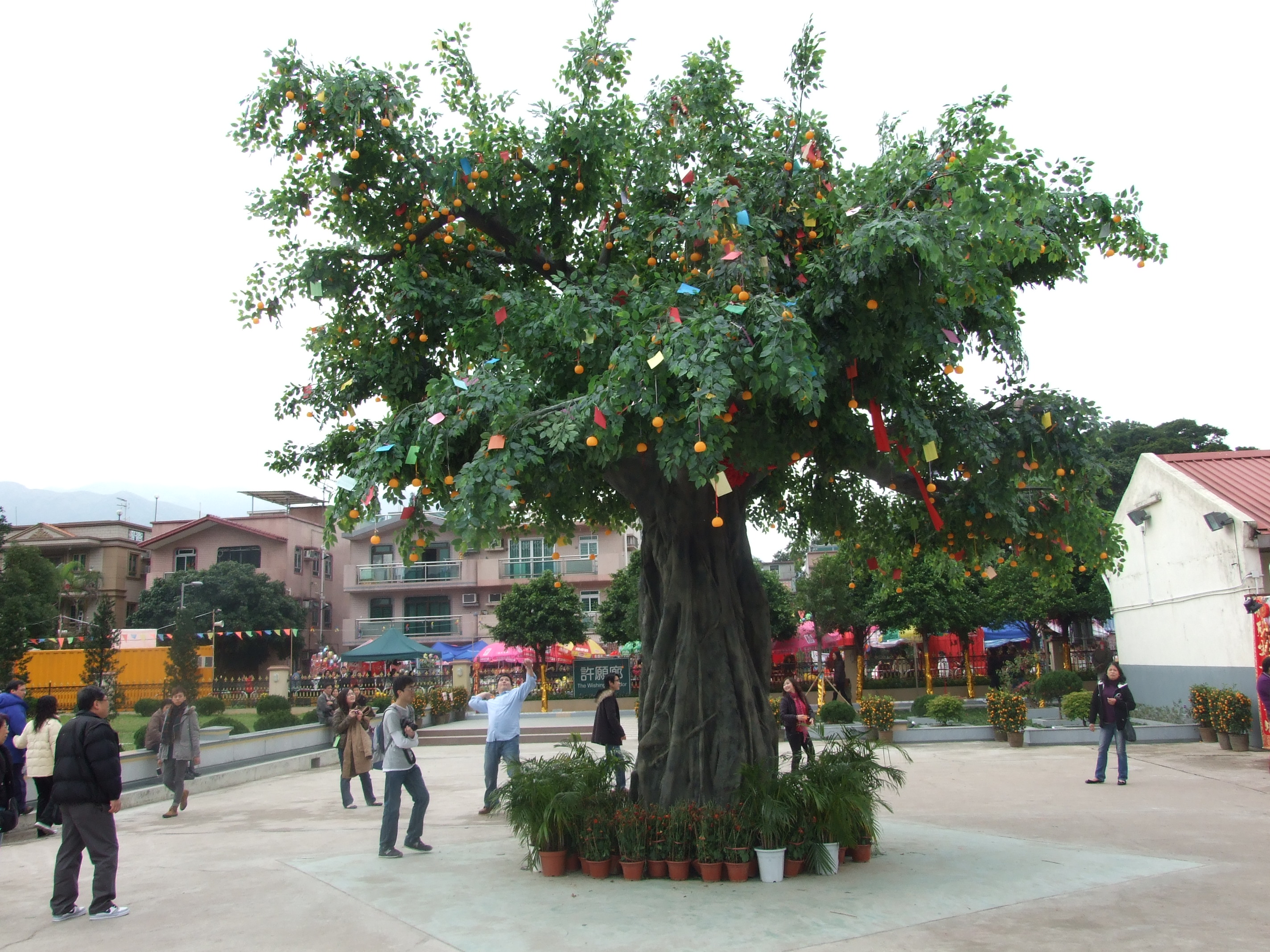
The new plastic artificial tree

On 12 February 2005, the fourth day of the Chinese New Year, one of the branches was broken due to the large amount of oranges and paper offerings that were thrown onto the banyan tree. The accident injured a man aged 62 and a four-year-old boy. Tree experts soon examined the structure and condition of the wishing tree, and concluded that all unhealthy branches would be removed, and wounds on the tree had been treated to avoid infection. As a result, the throwing of "Bao Die" was quickly prohibited by the government after the incident, meanwhile reinforcing the wishing tradition by letting people hang the offerings on a wooden frame placed next to the original banyan tree. Due to the lack of attractiveness of the attraction, a new plastic tree from Guangzhou was purchased in late 2009; plastic mandarin oranges are now only allowed to be tied to the branches. The tradition was able to continue since then.

== See also ==
- Lam Tsuen River
- Wish tree
