= Chuen Shui Tseng =

Village in Tai Po District, Hong Kong

Coordinates: 22.4464470°N 114.1369056°E

Chuen Shui Tseng (Chinese: 泉水井) is a village in Lam Tsuen, Tai Po District, Hong Kong.

== Recognised status ==
Chuen Shui Tseng is a recognised village under the New Territories Small House Policy.
