= Wai Tau Tsuen =

Village in Tai Po District, Hong Kong

Coordinates: 22.463445°N 114.147018°E

Wai Tau Tsuen (Chinese: 圍頭村) is a village in Lam Tsuen, Tai Po District, Hong Kong.

== Administration ==
Wai Tau Tsuen is a recognized village under the New Territories Small House Policy. It is one of the villages represented within the Tai Po Rural Committee. For electoral purposes, Wai Tau Tsuen is part of the Lam Tsuen Valley constituency, which is currently represented by Richard Chan Chun-chit.
