= Shui Wo =

Coordinates: 22.444189°N 114.126879°E

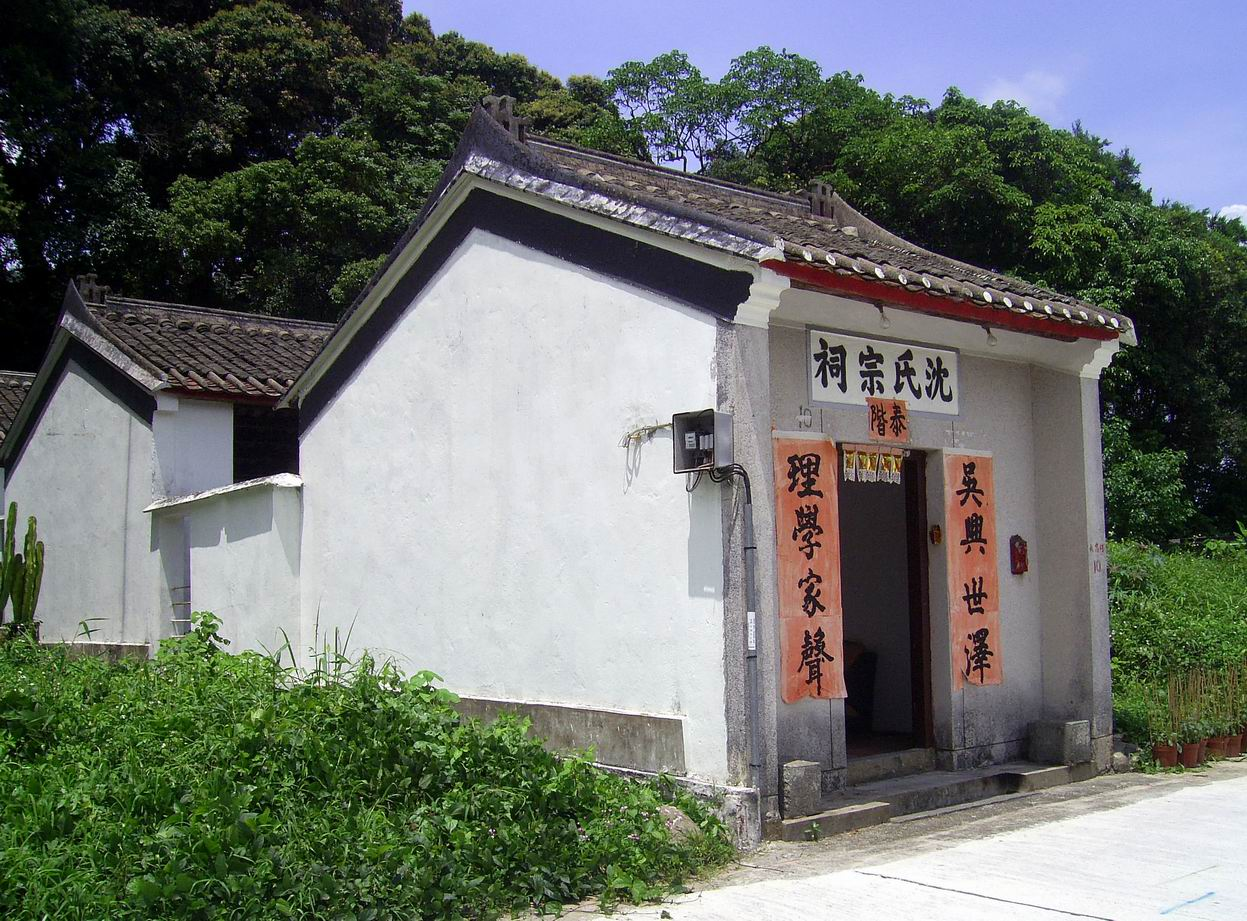
Shum Ancestral Hall in Shui Wo in April 2008.

Shui Wo (Chinese: 水窩) is a village in Lam Tsuen, Tai Po District, Hong Kong.

== Administration ==
Shui Wo, including Sha Pa (沙壩), is a recognized village under the New Territories Small House Policy.

== History ==
At the time of the 1911 census, the population of Shui Wo was 92. The number of males was 41.
