= Lin Au =

Coordinates: 22.443154°N 114.14667°E

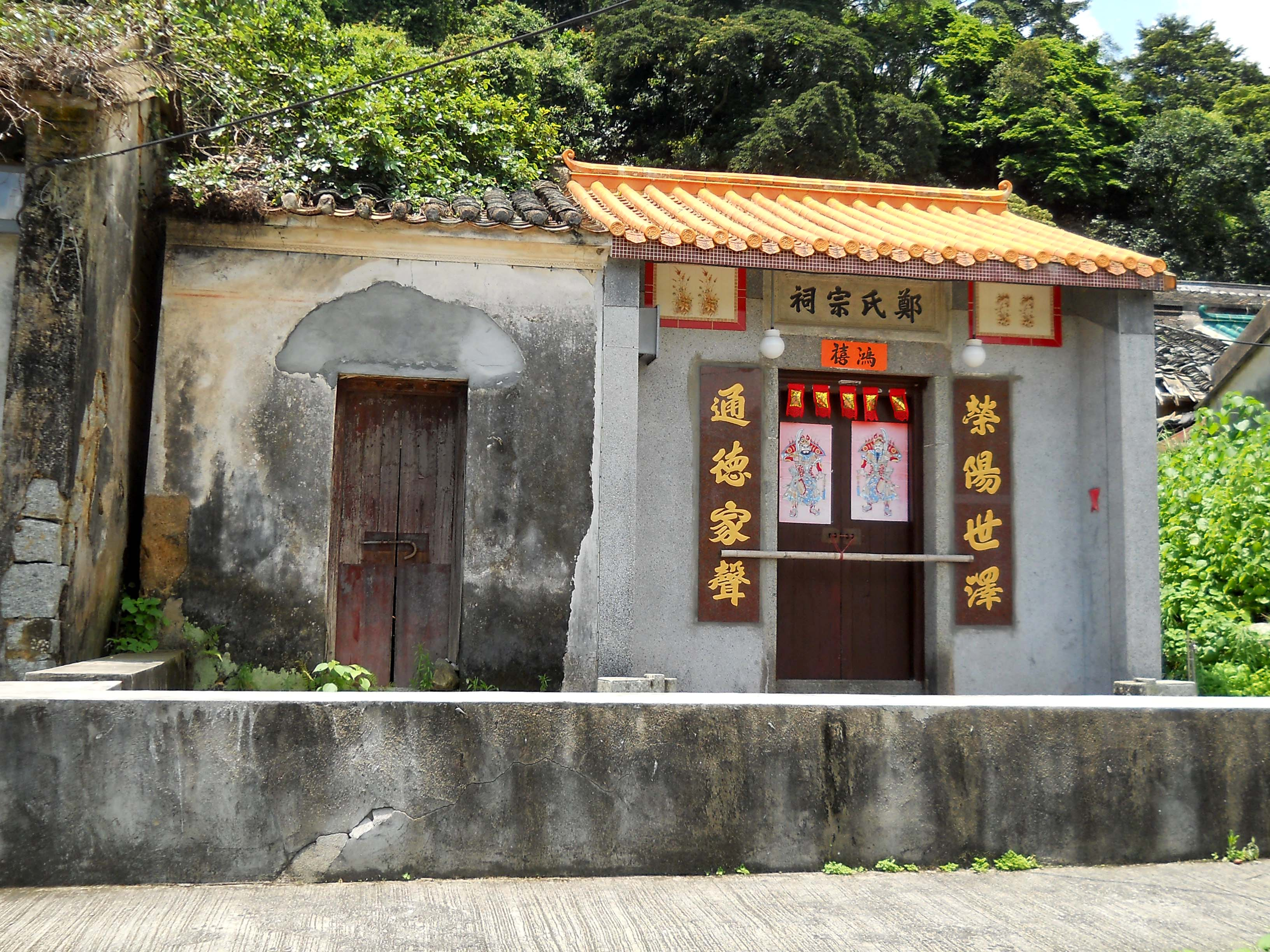
Cheng Ancestral Hall in Lin Au.

Lin Au, also known as Lin O (Chinese: 蓮澳 or 蓮凹), is a Hakka village in Lam Tsuen, Tai Po District, Hong Kong. It is one of the 23 villages in Lam Tsuen Valley.

Lin Au is divided into two small villages, Lin Au Lee Uk (蓮澳李屋) and Lin Au Cheng Uk (蓮澳鄭屋).

== Administration ==
Lin Au Lee Uk and Lin Au Cheng Uk are recognized villages under the New Territories Small House Policy.
