= Siu Om Shan =

Coordinates: 22.43814°N 114.13932°E

Siu Om Shan (Chinese: 小菴山) is a village in Lam Tsuen, Tai Po District, Hong Kong.

== Administration ==
Siu Om Shan is a recognized village under the New Territories Small House Policy.
