= San Tong =

Settlement in Hong Kong

Coordinates: 22.448616°N 114.135973°E

San Tong (Chinese: 新塘) is a village in Lam Tsuen, Tai Po District, the New Territories, Hong Kong.

== Recognised status ==
San Tong is a recognised village under the New Territories Small House Policy.

== See also ==
- Lam Tsuen San Tsuen, a village adjacent to San Tong, located to its northeast
- Ping Long, a village adjacent to San Tong, located to its southwest
