= Ping Long =

Ping Long 坪朗村
- Ping Long Tsuen
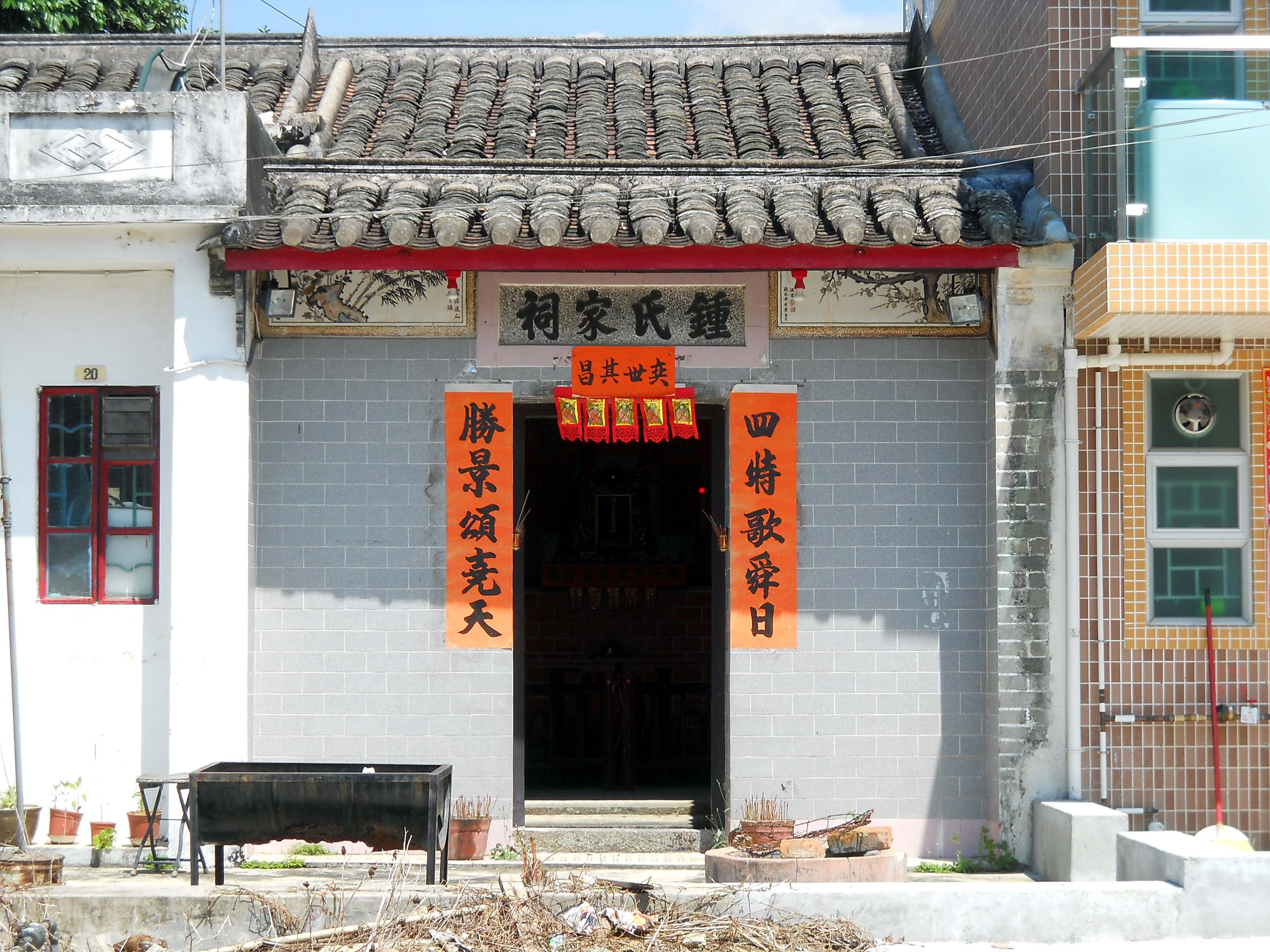
- Chung Ancestral Hall in Ping Long
- Motto: 四特歌舜日，勝景頌堯天
- Interactive map of Ping Long
- Coordinates: 22.445213°N 114.132649°E
- Country: China
- SAR: Hong Kong
- District: Tai Po District
- Founder: Chung (鍾) family
- Seat: Ping Long Village Office

Government
  - Type: Village Hall
- Demonym: Hongkongers
- Time zone: UTC+8 (+8)

Ping Long (Chinese: 坪朗) is a village in Lam Tsuen, Tai Po District, Hong Kong.

== Administration ==
Ping Long is a recognized village under the New Territories Small House Policy.

== See also ==
- San Tong, a village adjacent to Ping Long, located to its northeast
- Tai Om, a village adjacent to Ping Long, located to its south
