= Hang Ha Po =

Village in Lam Tsuen, Hong Kong

Coordinates: 22.458259°N 114.144258°E

Hang Ha Po (Chinese: 坑下莆) is a village in Lam Tsuen, Tai Po District, Hong Kong.

== Administration ==
Hang Ha Po is a recognized village under the New Territories Small House Policy.

== Geography ==
Adjacent villages:

- Kau Liu Ha, to the northeast
- San Uk Pai, to the south, across Lam Kam Road (林錦公路)
- Fong Ma Po. to the southwest
