= Lam Tsuen San Tsuen =

Village in Hong Kong

Coordinates: 22.449937°N 114.138314°E

San Tsuen (Chinese: 新村) or Lam Tsuen San Tsuen (Chinese: 林村新村) is a village in Lam Tsuen, Tai Po District, Hong Kong.

== See also ==
- San Tong, a village adjacent to Lam Tsuen San Tsuen, located to its southwest
