= Pak Ngau Shek Ha Tsuen =

Village in Tai Po District, Hong Kong

Coordinates: 22.442703°N 114.124891°E

Pak Ngau Shek Ha Tsuen (Chinese: 白牛石下村) is a village in Lam Tsuen, Tai Po District, Hong Kong.

== Administration ==
Pak Ngau Shek Ha Tsuen is a recognized village under the New Territories Small House Policy.

== History ==
At the time of the 1911 census, the population of Pak Ngau Shek was 53. The number of males was 22.

== See also ==
- Pak Ngau Shek Sheung Tsuen
