= Nam Wa Po =

Village in Tai Po District, Hong Kong

Coordinates: 22.475572°N 114.151496°E

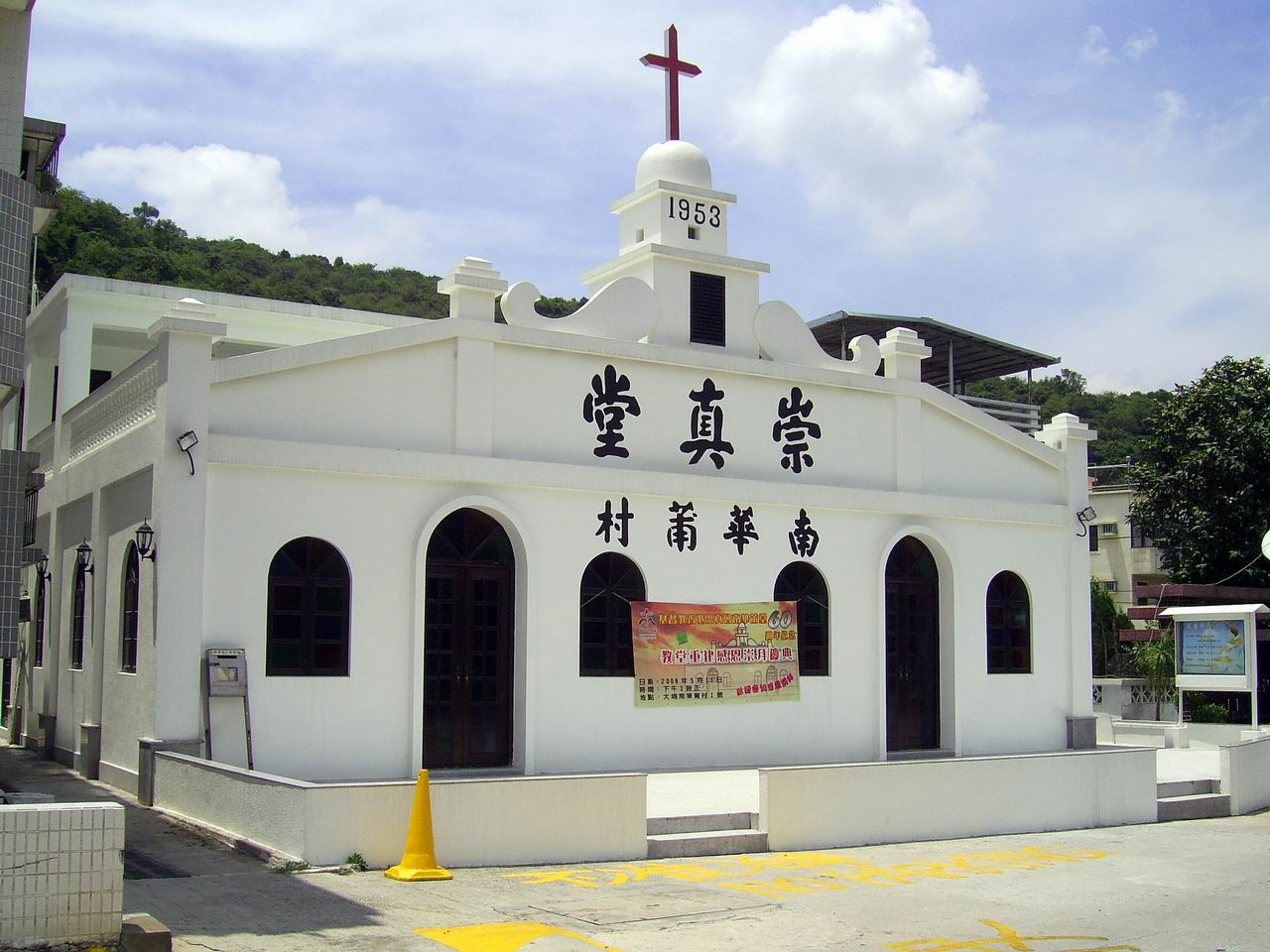
Nam Wah Po Tsung Tsin Church.

Nam Wa Po (Chinese: 南華莆) is a village in Lam Tsuen, Tai Po District, Hong Kong.

== Administration ==
Nam Wa Po is a recognized village under the New Territories Small House Policy. It is one of the villages represented within the Tai Po Rural Committee. For electoral purposes, Nam Wa Po is part of the Lam Tsuen Valley constituency, which is currently represented by Richard Chan Chun-chit.
