= Tai Om =

Village in Hong Kong

Coordinates: 22.443398°N 114.13332°E

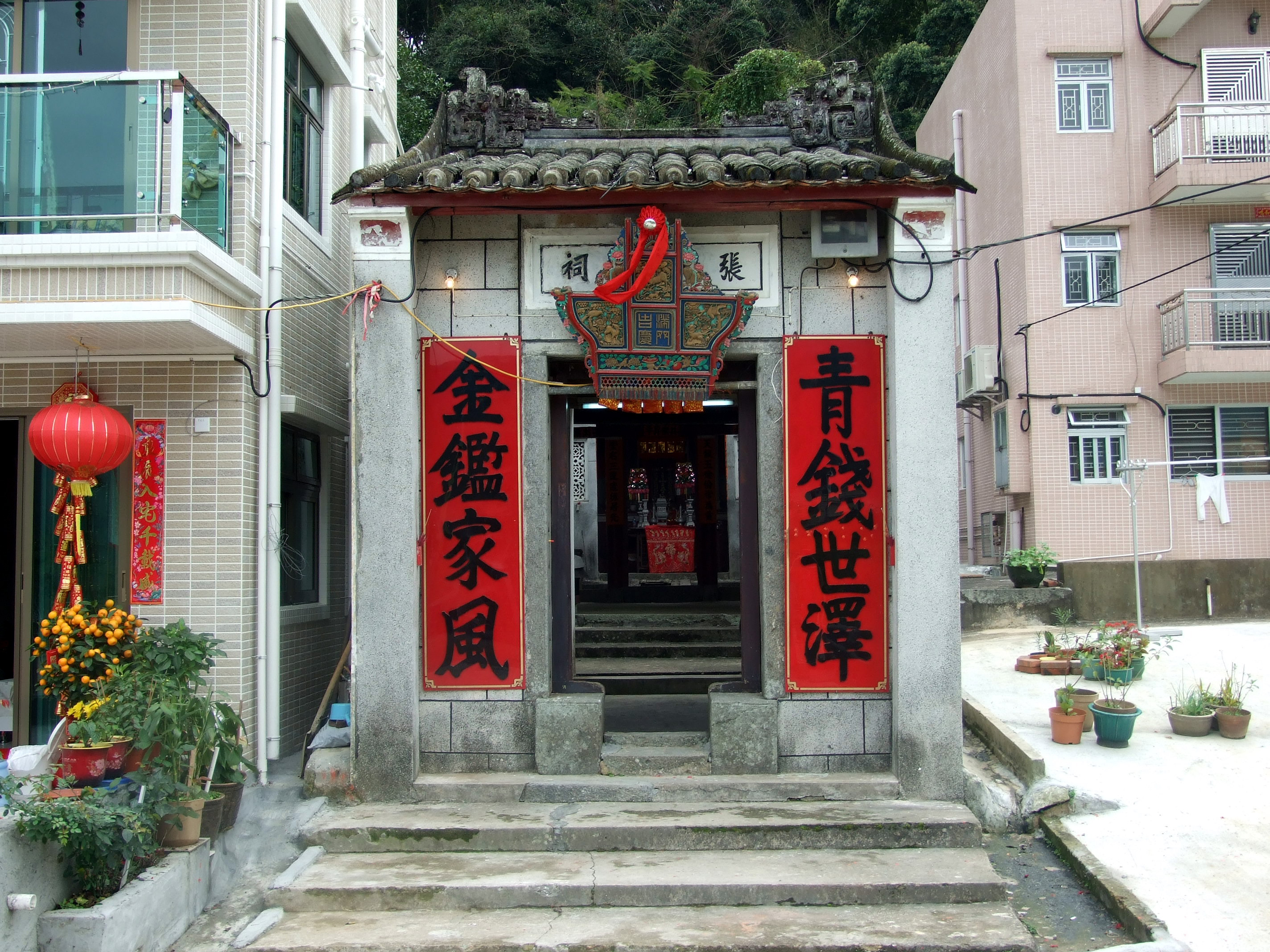
Cheung Ancestral Hall in Tai Om.

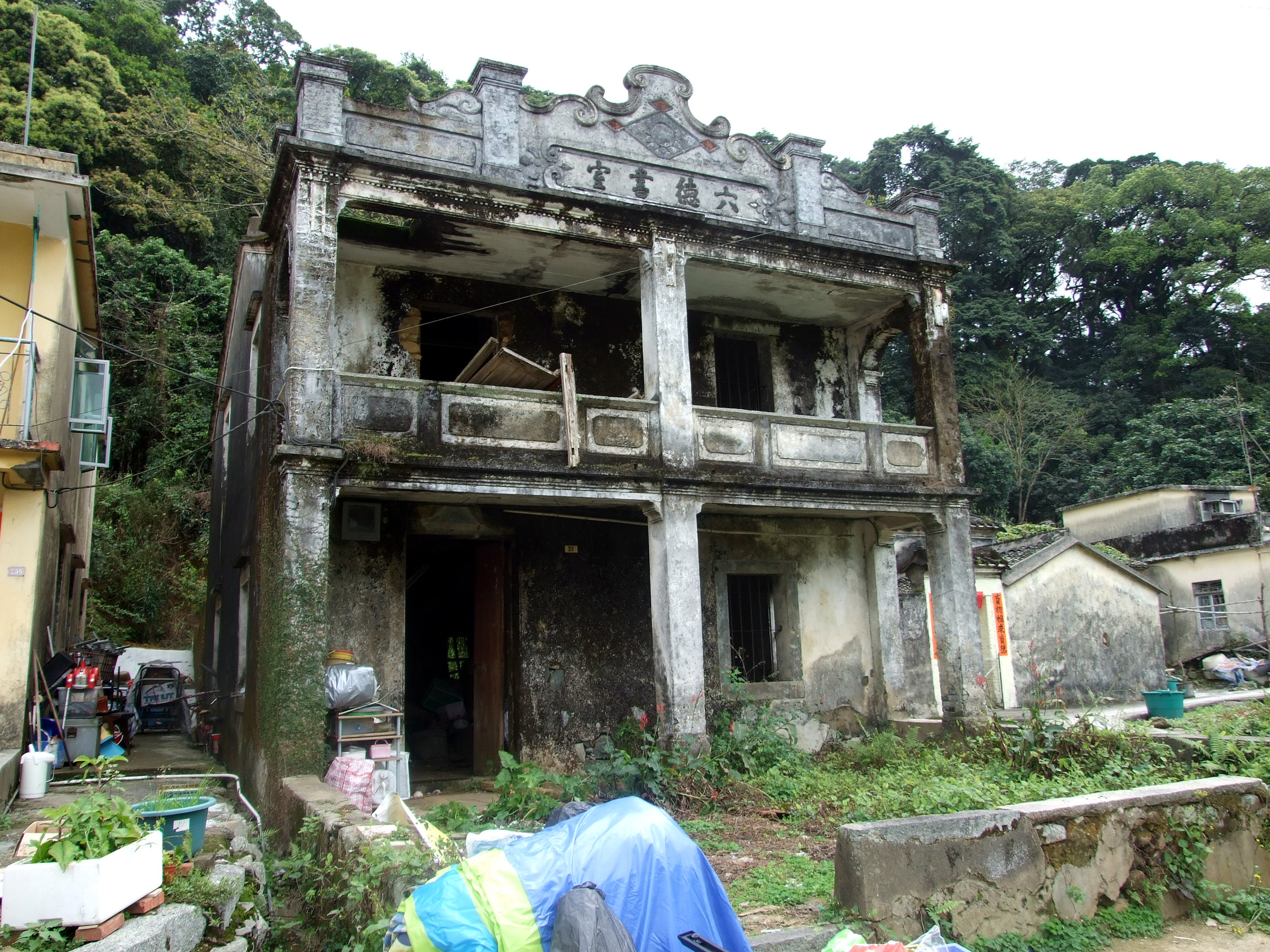
Luk Tak Study Hall in Tai Om.

Tai Om (Chinese: 大菴) is a village in Lam Tsuen, Tai Po District, Hong Kong.

== Administration ==
Tai Om is a recognized village under the New Territories Small House Policy.

== History ==
Tai Om was historically a single-clan Hakka village, settled by the Cheung family (張). The founding ancestors had moved from Wuhua in Guangdong province to Tai Mo Shan, and later settled in Tai Om around 1800. (other sources mention that the village was founded in the 17th century)

At the time of the 1911 census, the population of Tai Om was 162. The number of males was 74.

== Conservation ==
The Tai Om Feng Shui Woodland, covering an area of 2.7 hectares, was designated as a Site of Special Scientific Interest in 2005. It is located on a knoll behind the village. A part of it was converted into orchards in the 1940s.

Luk Tak Study Hall, built in the 1930s, has been listed as a Grade III historic building.

Tai Om Old Brick Kiln has been listed as a Site of Archaeological Interest.

== See also ==
- Ping Long, a village adjacent to Tai Om, located to its north
