= Kau Liu Ha =

Village in Tai Po District, Hong Kong

Coordinates: 22.459545°N 114.144991°E

Kau Liu Ha (Chinese: 較寮下) is a village in Lam Tsuen, Tai Po District, Hong Kong.

== Administration ==
Kau Liu Ha is a recognized village under the New Territories Small House Policy.

== See also ==
- Hang Ha Po, a village adjacent to Kau Liu Ha, located to its southwest
