= Lung A Pai =

Coordinates: 22.443821°N 114.138024°E

Lung A Pai (龍丫排; Cantonese Yale: lùhng ā pàih) is a village in Lam Tsuen, Tai Po District, Hong Kong.

== Recognised status ==
Lung A Pai is a recognised village under the New Territories Small House Policy.
