= Chung Uk Tsuen (Tai Po District) =

Village in Tai Po District, Hong Kong

Coordinates: 22.455070°N 114.141083°E

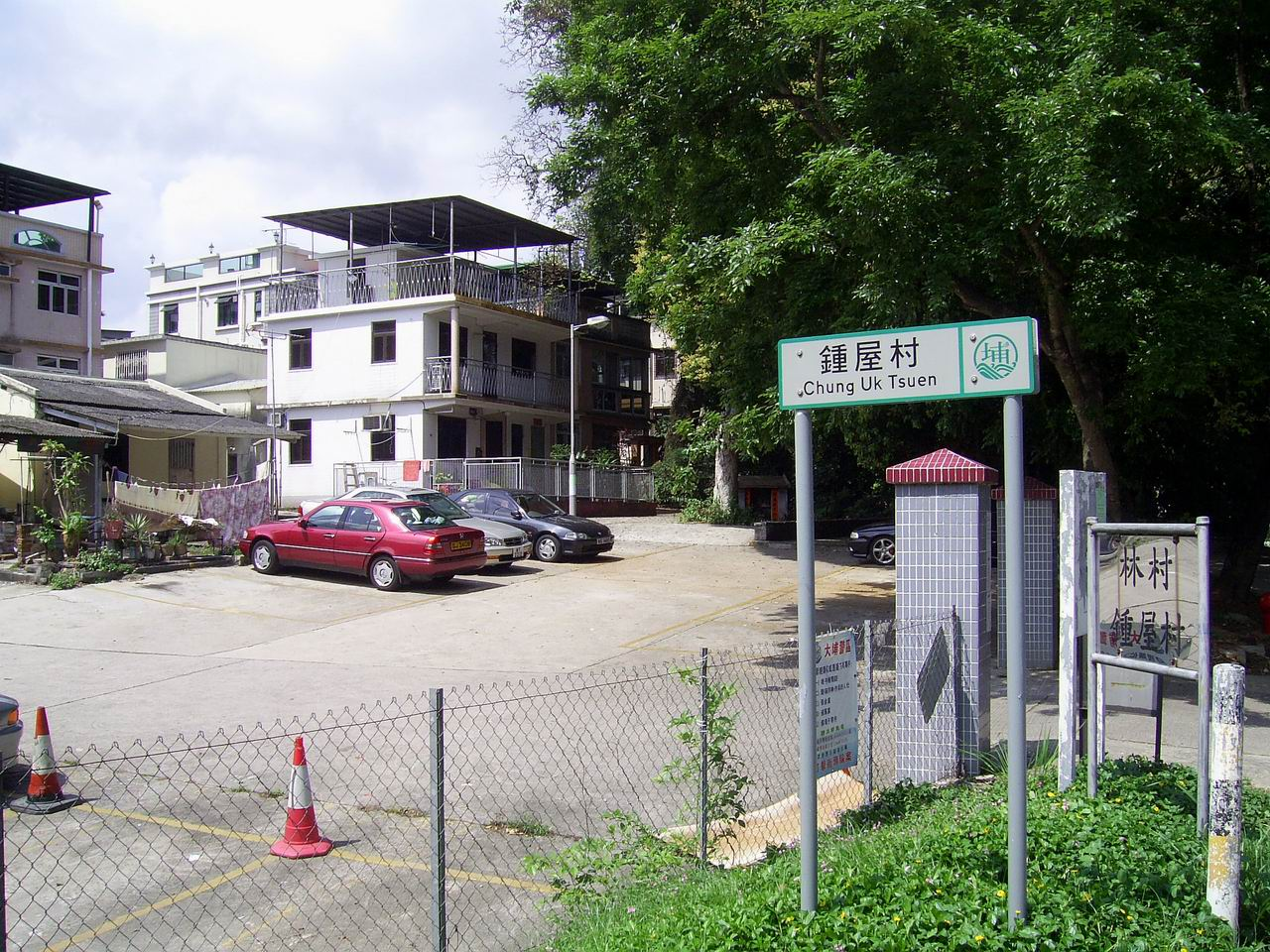
Chung Uk Tsuen (Tai Po District)

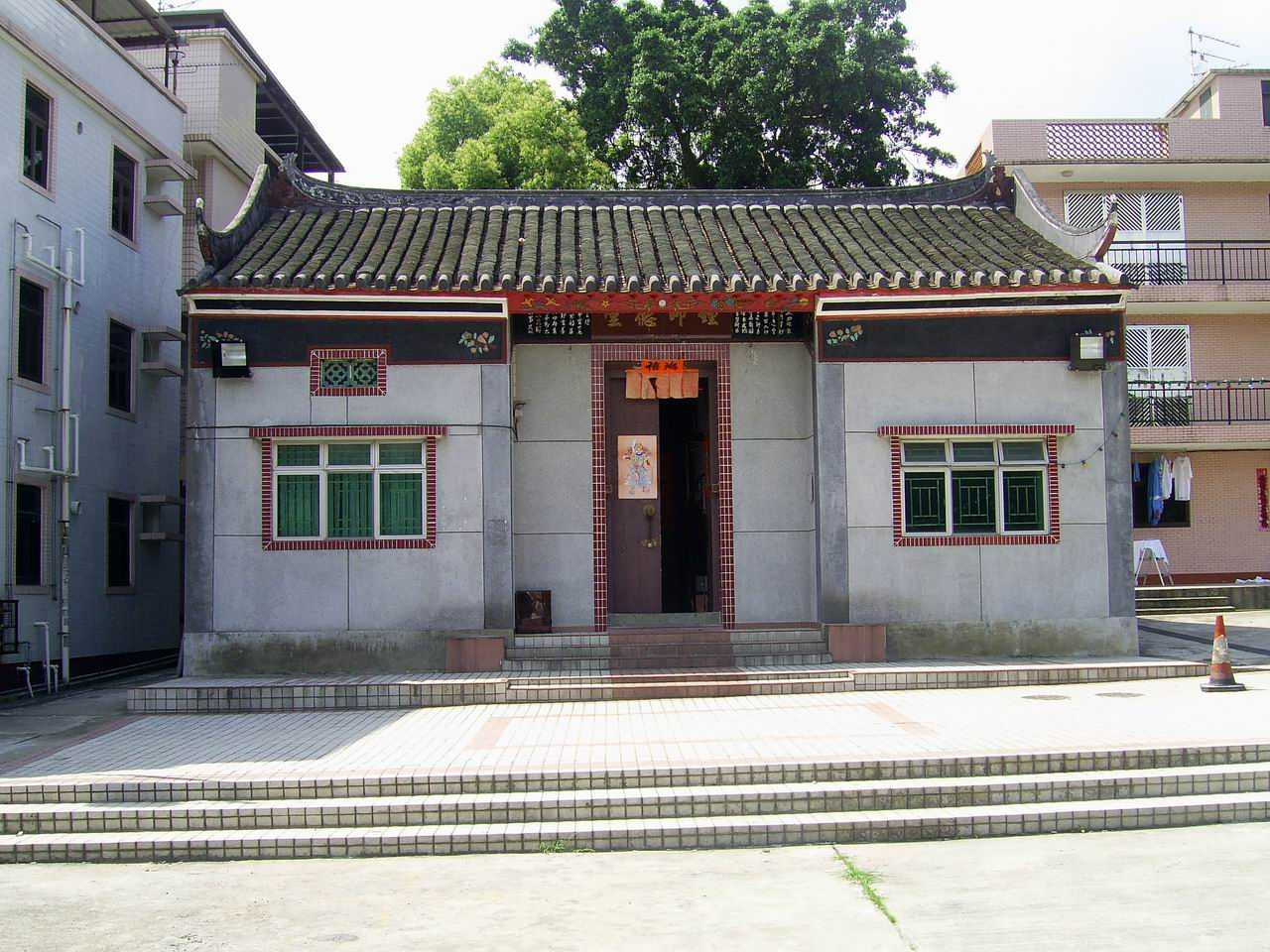
Chung Ancestral Hall in Chung Uk Tsuen (Tai Po District)

Chung Uk Tsuen (Chinese: 鍾屋村) is a village in Lam Tsuen, Tai Po District, Hong Kong.

== Administration ==
Chung Uk Tsuen is a recognized village under the New Territories Small House Policy.
