= San Uk Tsai (Tai Po District) =

Coordinates: 22°27′20″N 114°08′23″E

San Uk Tsai (Chinese: 新屋仔) is a village in Lam Tsuen, Tai Po District, Hong Kong.

== Administration ==
San Uk Tsai is a recognized village under the New Territories Small House Policy.
