= She Shan Tsuen =

Village in Hong Kong

Coordinates: 22.450221°N 114.144522°E

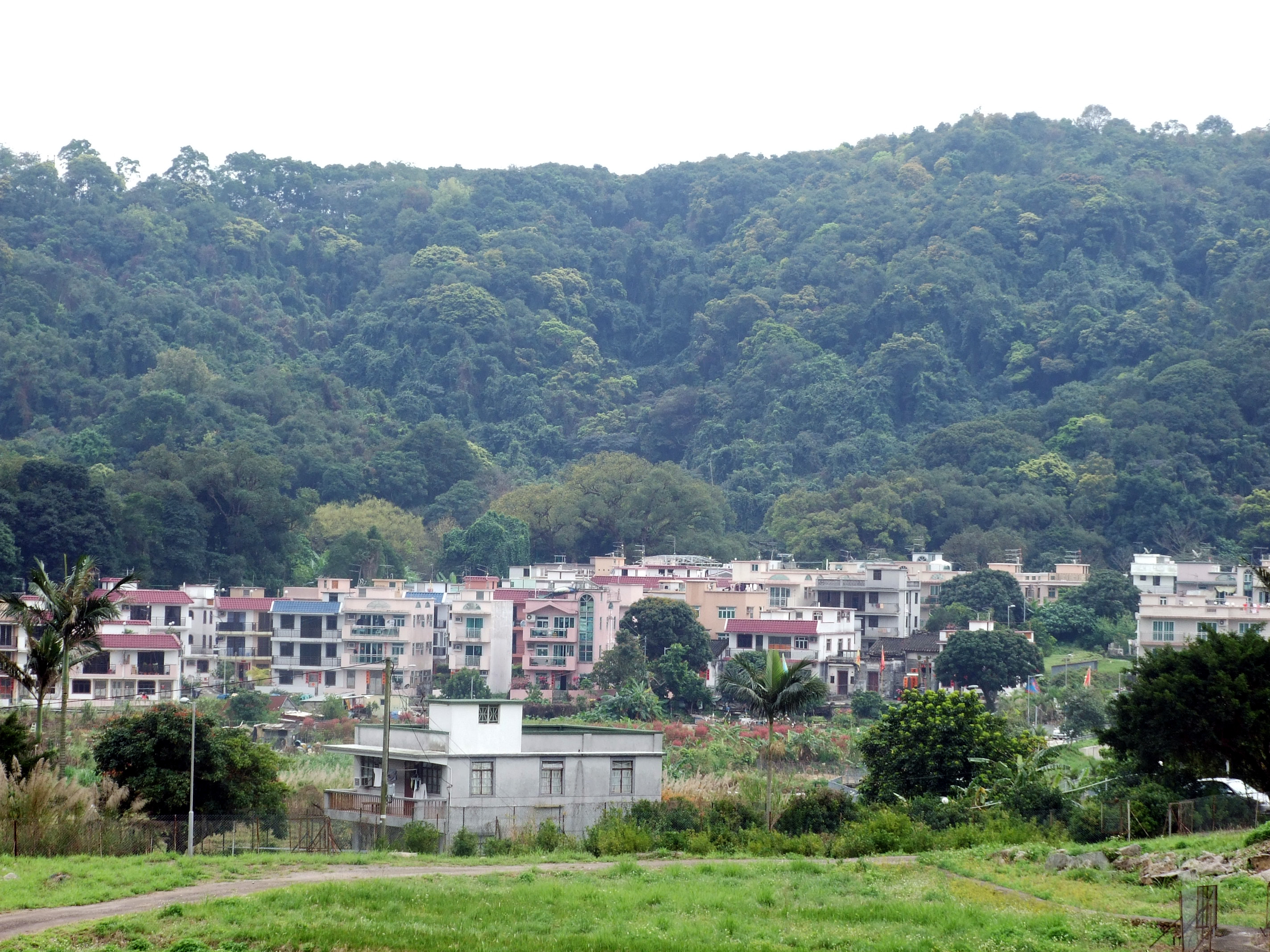
She Shan Tsuen in February 2010.

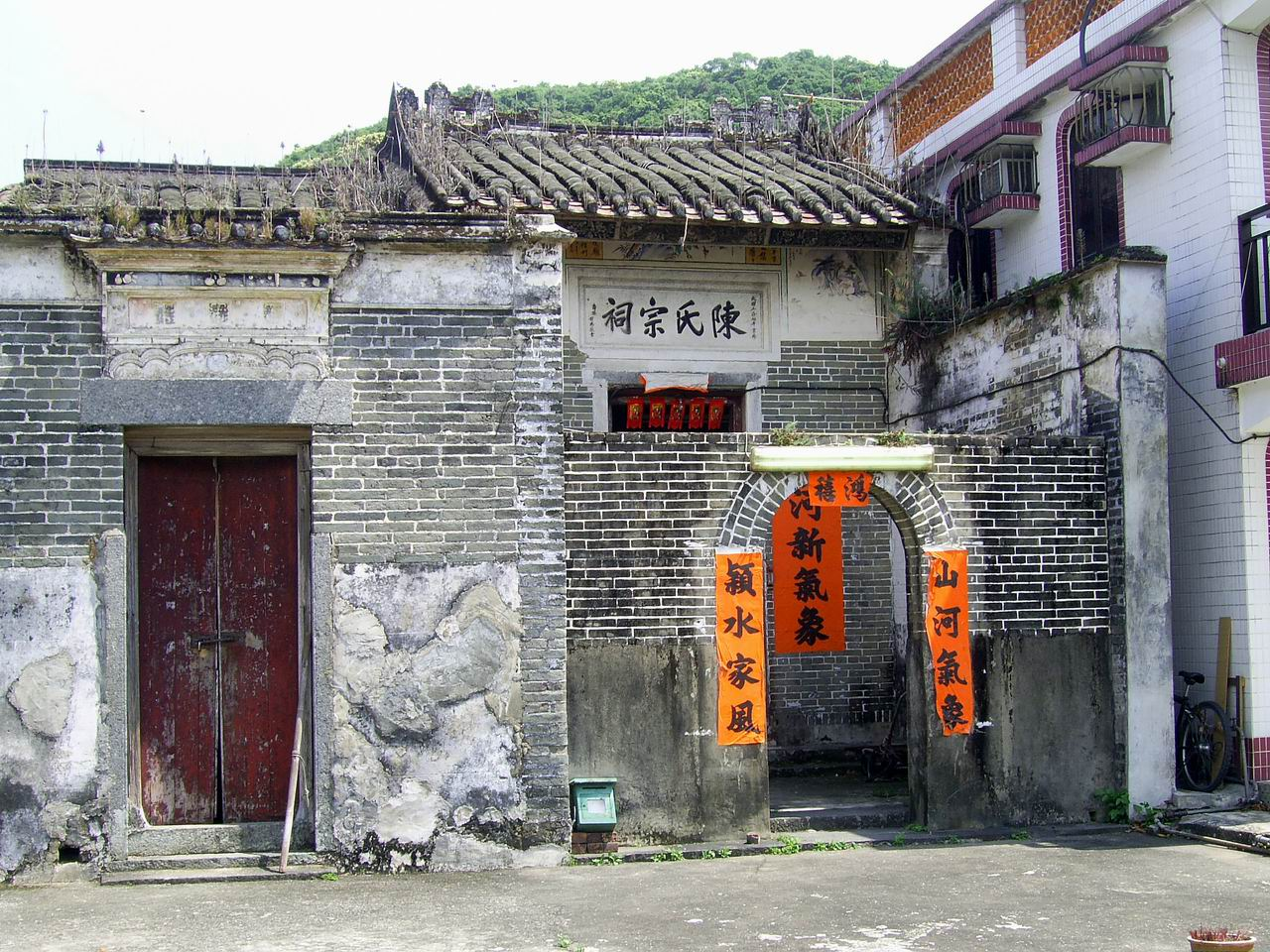
Chan Ancestral Hall in She Shan Tsuen in April 2008.

She Shan Tsuen (Chinese: 社山村) is a village in Lam Tsuen, Tai Po District, Hong Kong.

== Administration ==
She Shan is a recognized village under the New Territories Small House Policy.

== Conservation ==
The feng shui woodland at the back of the village of She Shan, covering an area of 5.7 hectares, was designated as a Site of Special Scientific Interest in 1975.
