= Lam Tsuen =

Human settlement in Tai Po District, Hong Kong

Coordinates: 22.4558°N 114.1258°E

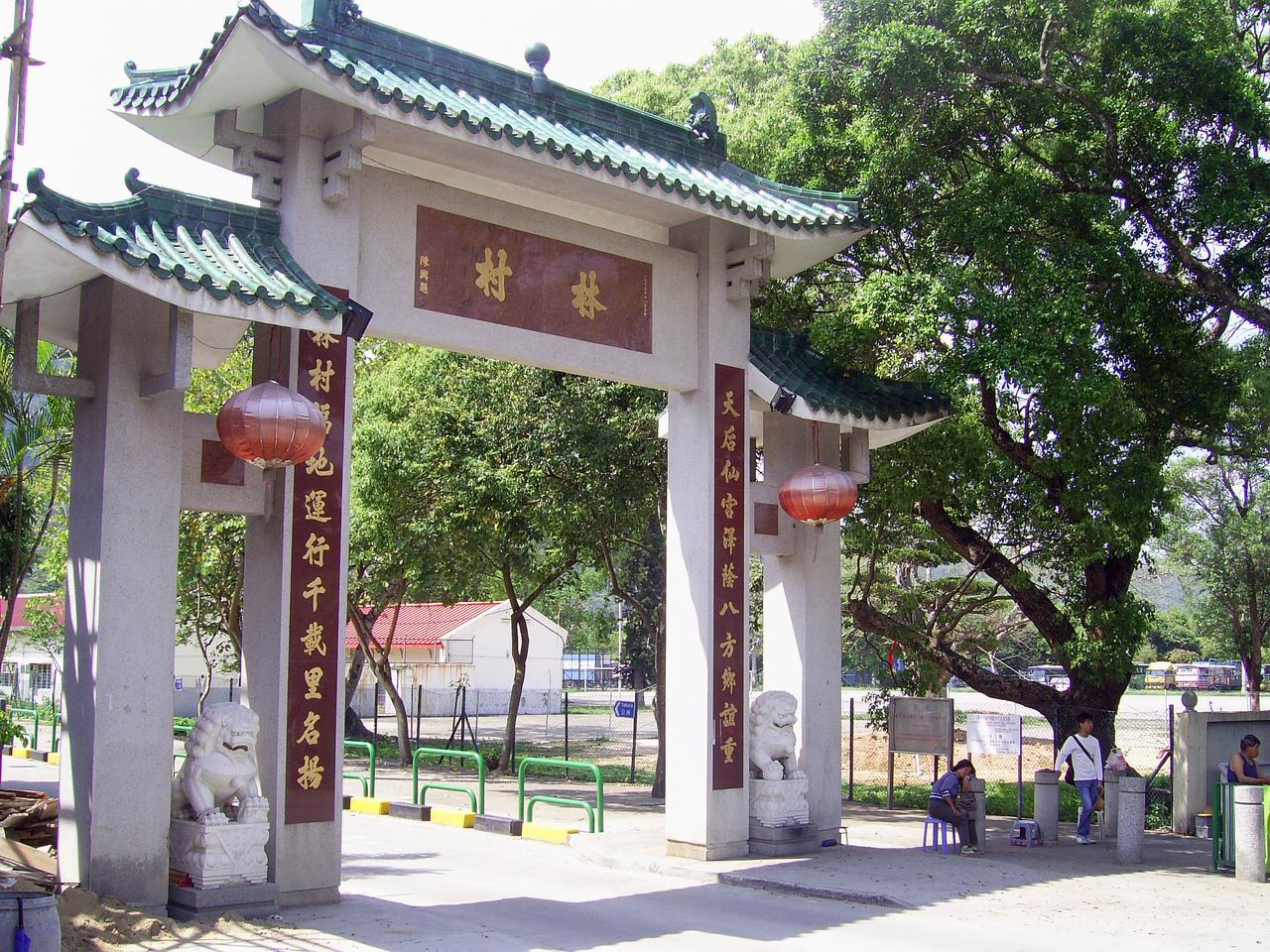
- Paifang of Lam Tsuen
- Traditional Chinese: 林村
- Simplified Chinese: 林村
Transcriptions
Standard Mandarin
- Hanyu Pinyin: Líncūn

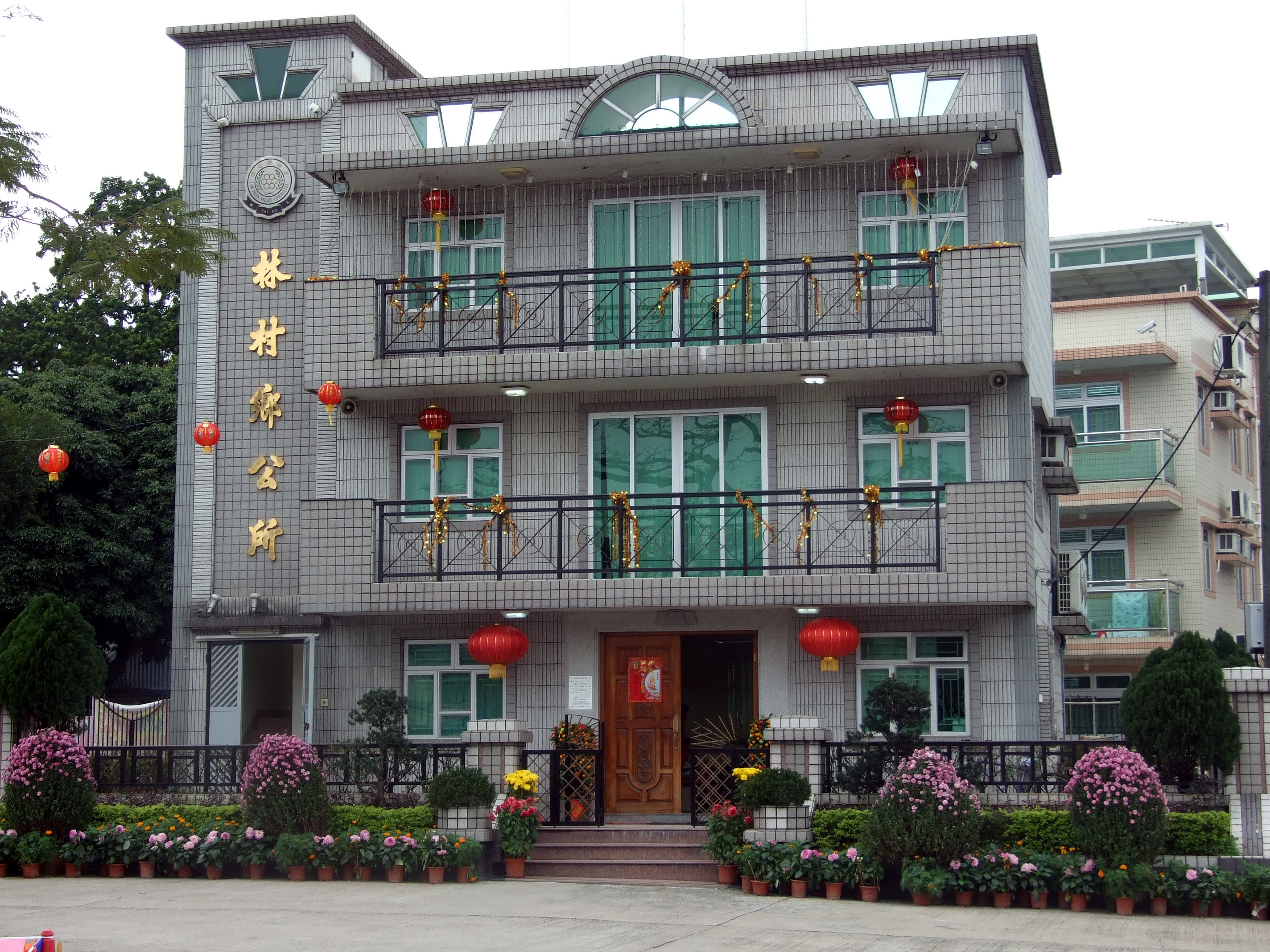
Lam Tsuen Valley Committee building.

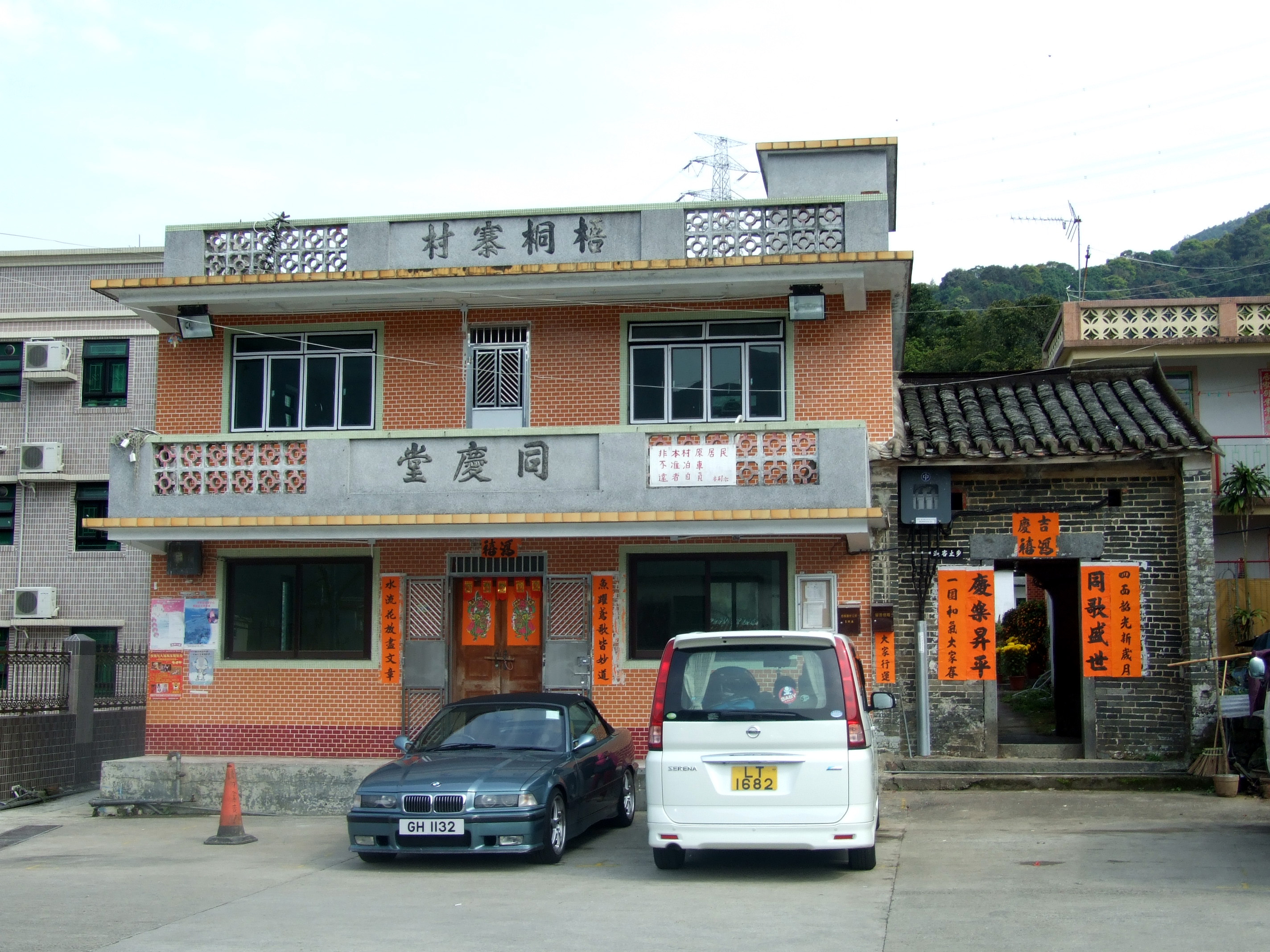
Ng Tung Chai.

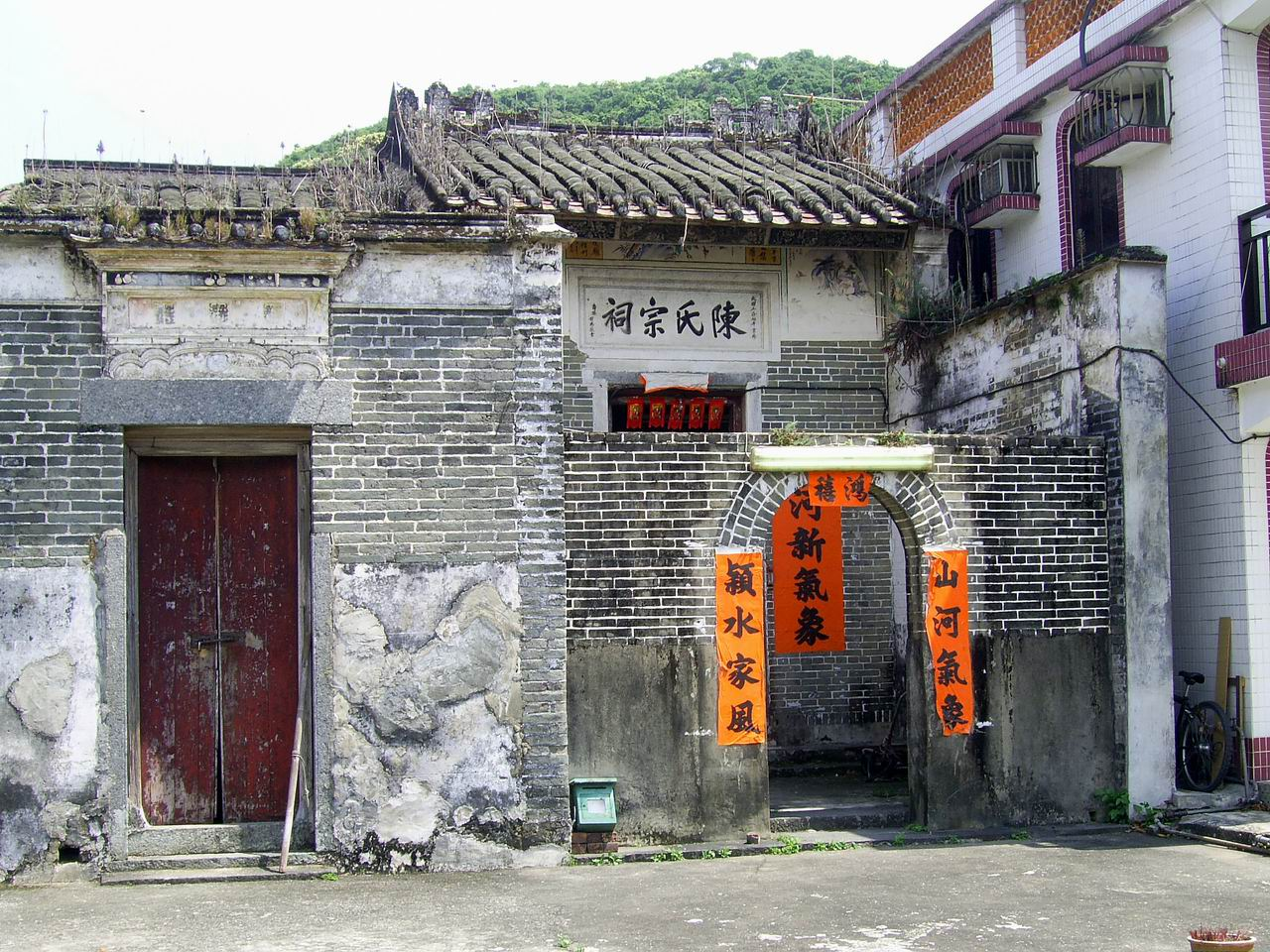
Chan ancestral hall in She Shan.

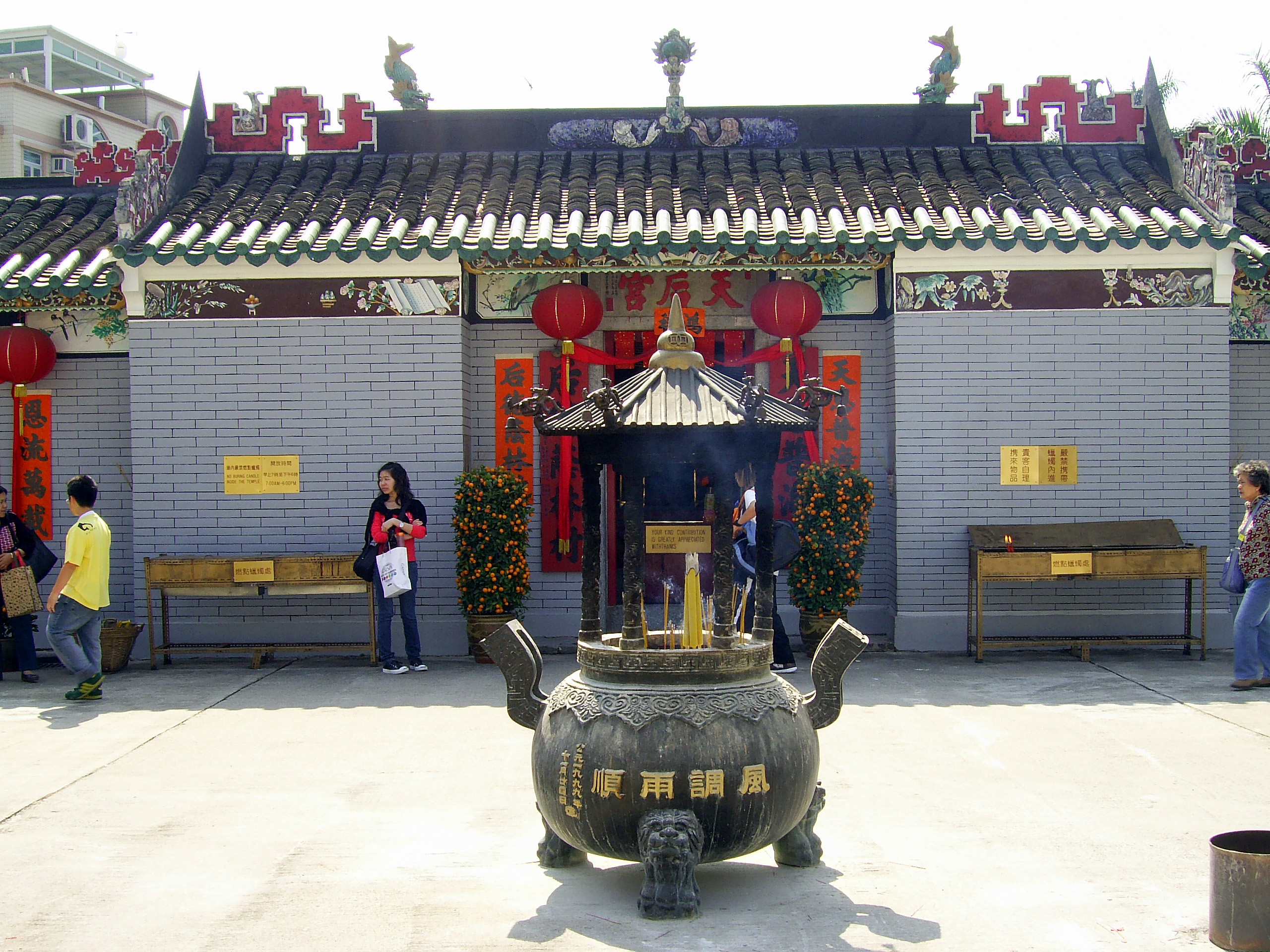
Tin Hau Temple in Fong Ma Po.

Lam Tsuen (Chinese: 林村) is an area in Tai Po District, Hong Kong, noted for its Lam Tsuen wishing trees. The nearby Lam Tsuen River, empties into Tai Po Hoi.

== History ==
During the Qing dynasty, Lam Tsuen was a member of Tai Po Tsat Yeuk (大埔七約; 'Tai Po Seven Alliances'), an inter-village alliance that established Tai Wo Market (太和市) in 1892 in order to break the monopoly of the old Tai Po Market (大埔墟) founded by the Tang Clan of Lung Yeuk Tau (龍躍頭鄧氏).

== Villages ==
Lam Tsuen is not a village in the political sense but rather a union of the 23 villages scattered across the Lam Tsuen Valley along with five indigenous (Punti) villages and 18 Hakka villages.

Today, Lam Tsuen spreads over an area covering 26 villages:

- Chai Kek (寨乪)
- Chung Uk Tsuen (鍾屋村), the oldest village in Lam Tsuen, was established more than 600 years ago.
- Fong Ma Po (放馬莆, lit. "place for grazing horses"), a Punti village, where the Tin Hau Temple and the Lam Tsuen wishing trees are located
- Hang Ha Po (坑下莆)
- Kau Liu Ha (較寮下)
- Lin Au Cheng Uk (蓮澳鄭屋)
- Lin Au Lei Uk (蓮澳李屋)
- Lung A Pai (龍丫排), a Hakka village
- Ma Po Mei (麻布尾)
- Nam Wa Po (南華莆)
- Ng Tung Chai (梧桐寨)
- Pak Ngau Shek Ha Tsuen (白牛石下村)
- Pak Ngau Shek Sheung Tsuen (白牛石上村)
- Ping Long (坪朗)
- San Tong (新塘)
- San Tsuen (新村)
- San Uk Tsai (新屋仔)
- She Shan Tsuen (社山村)
- Shui Wo (水窩)
- Siu Om Shan (小菴山)
- Tai Om (大菴)
- Tai Om Shan (大菴山)
- Tai Yeung Che (大陽輋)
- Tin Liu Ha (田寮下), a Hakka village, which was subdivided into 2 villages: Sheung Tin Liu Ha (上田寮下, Upper Tin Liu Ha) and Ha Tin Liu Ha (下田寮下, Lower Tin Liu Ha)
- Tong Sheung Tsuen (塘上村)
- Wai Tau Tsuen (圍頭村)

Name: although the union of villages is called Lam Tsuen, however, the majority of villagers has the surname: Chong (鍾姓), only a small proportion of residents are of surname Lam (林姓)

== Attractions ==
=== Wishing Tree ===
Wishing Tree is two camphor trees which were seen as "god" by the inhabitant. Traditionally, the villagers used to burn the joss paper and light up the candle under the trees for making wishes. In the legend, a woman who fell in ill dreamed that a god told her to visit Lam Tsuen and throw a piece of joss paper to the great tree. She followed the instruction and the women recovered. Afterwards, the people changed to toss the joss paper to the trees with their blessings written on it.

=== Tin Hau Temple ===
Tin Hau Temple at Lam Tsuen was built in 1768 to honour Tin Hau, the goddess of the sea, who calmed the sea to protect the fishermen. In the beginning, the villagers had inadequate capital to construct the temple but a rich man, Tang, paid for the construction cost after he knew the situation. Then, the villagers put Tang's monument into the temple for worship.

The villagers see the temple as the most sacred place in their village and the Bun Festival is held in there in every nine years. The regular worship and ceremony are also held in the Tin Hau Temple in normal days.

=== Well-Wishing Festival ===
Well-Wishing Festival was developed from traditional ritual for the inhabitant to the most representative ritual for making wishes in Hong Kong. The festival is held in the first couple of weeks of Chinese New Year. In the festival, the people can make wishes by tossing the joss paper, making lotus lanterns and doing other interesting activities. To attract more visitors, the Well-Wishing Carnival is developed and people can enjoy the cultural performance such as lion dance, and food stalls and game booths in the festival.

=== Da Jiu Festival ===
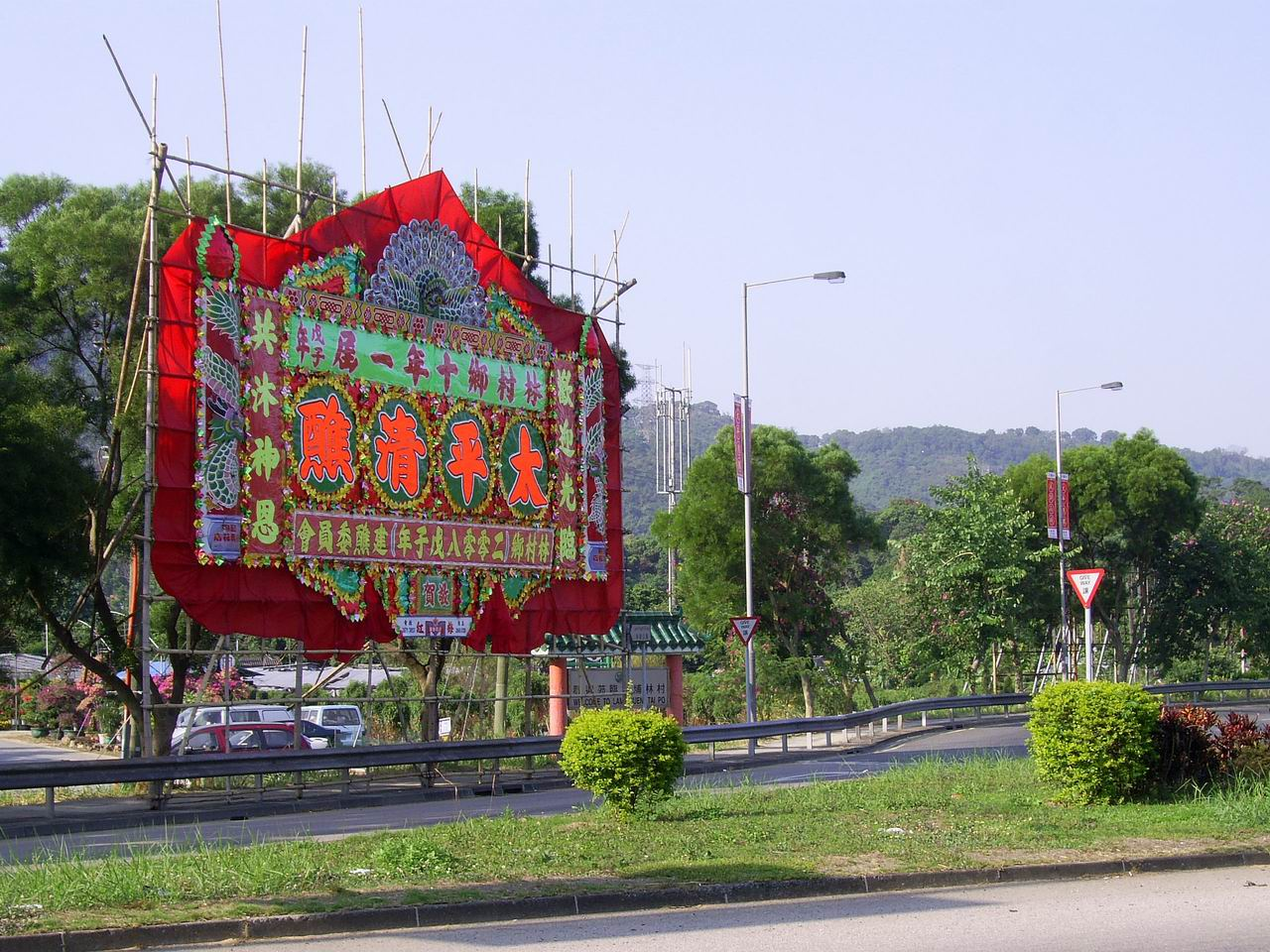
Da Jiu Festival in Lam Tsuen.

In Da Jiu Festival, people pray for good weather, health and peace in their village. This festival is held in Lam Tsuen in every 10 years. It lasts for five days and six nights.

== Education ==
Lam Tsuen is in Primary One Admission (POA) School Net 84. Within the school net are multiple aided schools (operated independently but funded with government money) and Tai Po Government Primary School (大埔官立小學).

== See also ==
- List of villages in Hong Kong
