= Nga Yiu Tau =

Nga Yiu Tau is the name of several places in Hong Kong:

- Nga Yiu Tau, North District in Sha Tau Kok, North District
- Nga Yiu Tau, Tai Po District in Tai Po District
- Nga Yiu Tau, Yuen Long District in Yuen Long District
