= Shui Tsiu Lo Wai =

Village in Hong Kong

Coordinates: 22.426181°N 114.032963°E

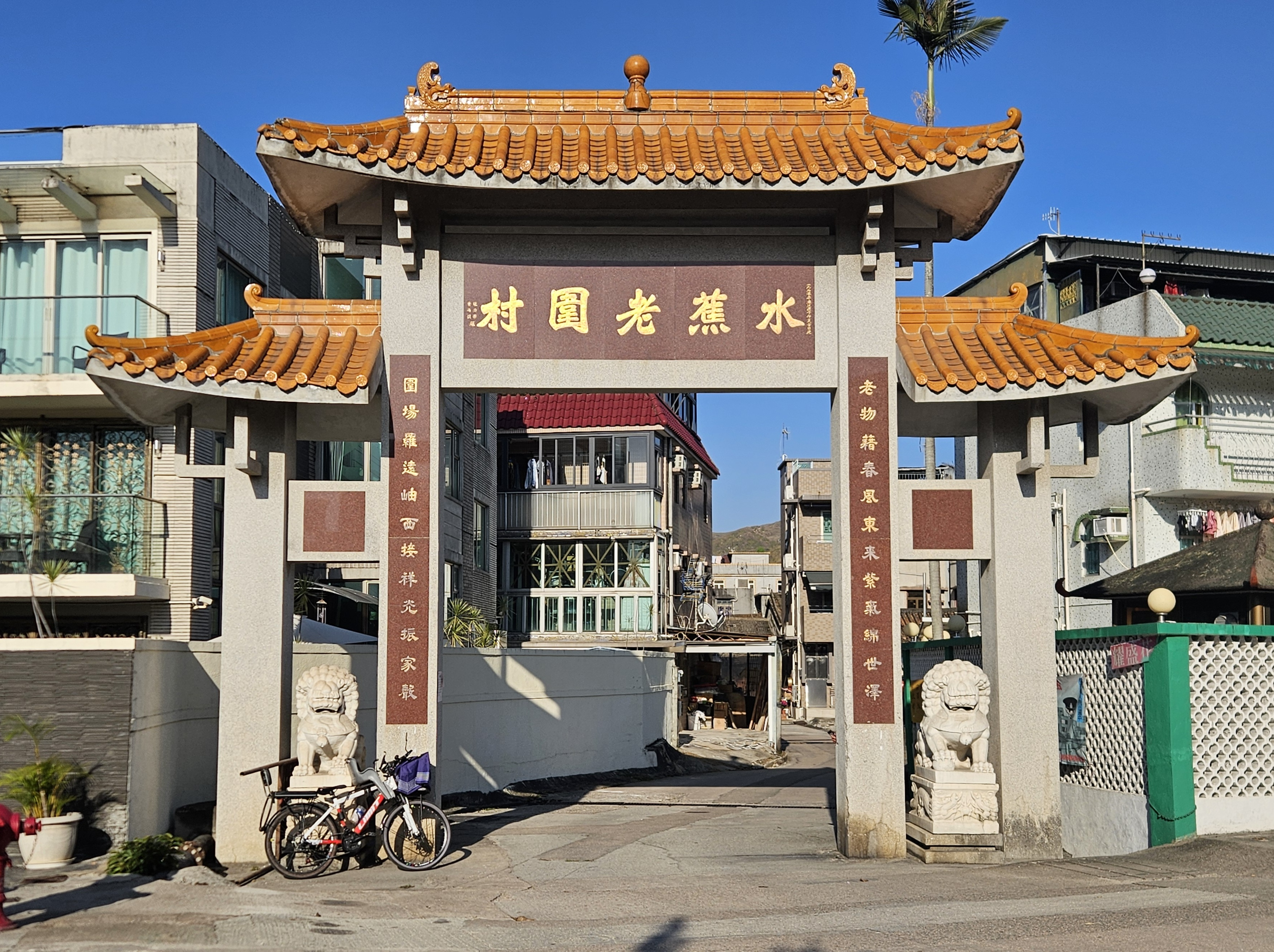
Archway of Shui Tsiu Lo Wai

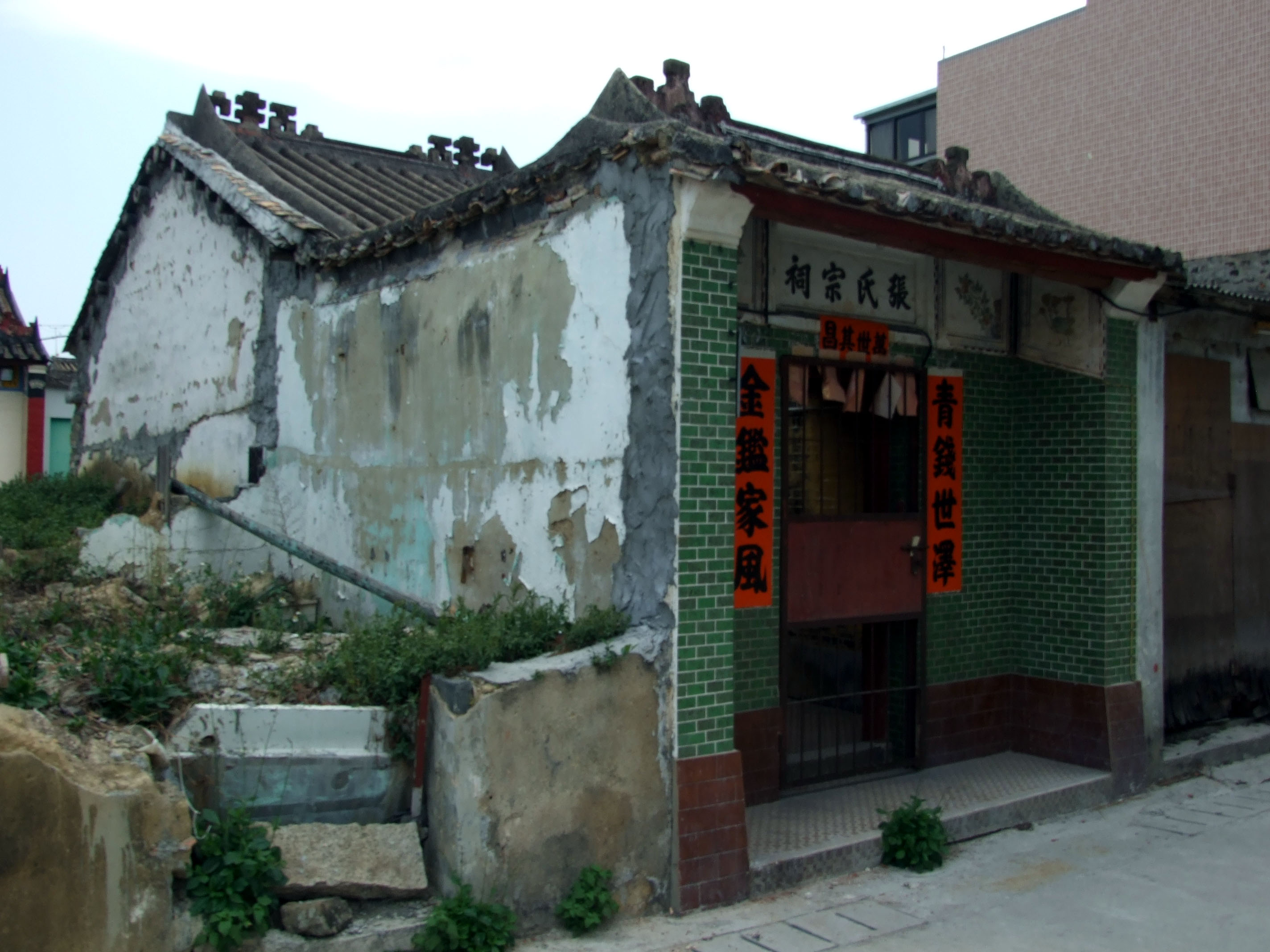
Cheung Ancestral Hall in Shui Tsiu Lo Wai in 2011

Shui Tsiu Lo Wai (Chinese: 水蕉老圍) is a village in the Shap Pat Heung area of Yuen Long District, Hong Kong.

== Administration ==
Shui Tsiu Lo Wai is a recognized village under the New Territories Small House Policy.

== Education ==
Shui Tsiu Lo Wai is divided between Primary One Admission (POA) School Net 73 and POA School Net 74. Within POA 73 are multiple aided schools (operated independently but funded with government money) and one government school: South Yuen Long Government Primary School (南元朗官立小學). POA 74 has multiple aided schools and one government school: Yuen Long Government Primary School (元朗官立小學).

== See also ==
- Shui Tsiu San Tsuen
