= Sheung Yau Tin Tsuen =

Village in Hong Kong

Sheung Yau Tin Tsuen Chinese: 上攸田
- Village
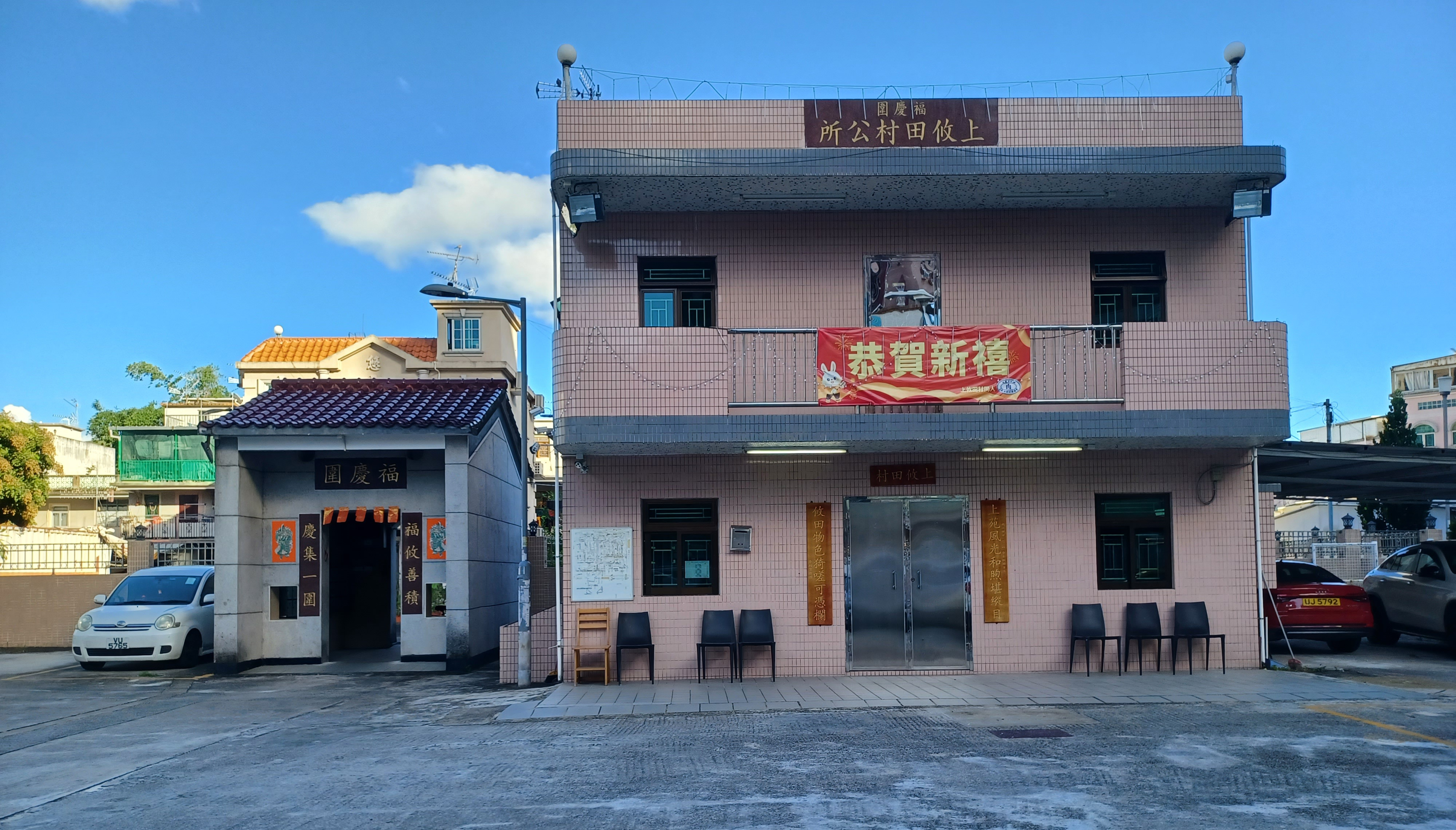
- Entrance gate (left) of Sheung Yau Tin Tsuen and village office (right).

- Location within Hong Kong
- Coordinates: 22.438521°N 114.035560°E
- Country: People's Republic of China
- Special administrative region: Hong Kong
- Region: Yuen Long District
- Area: Shap Pat Heung
- Time zone: UTC+8:00 (HKT)

Sheung Yau Tin Tsuen (Chinese: 上攸田) is a village in the Shap Pat Heung area of Yuen Long District, Hong Kong.

== Administration ==
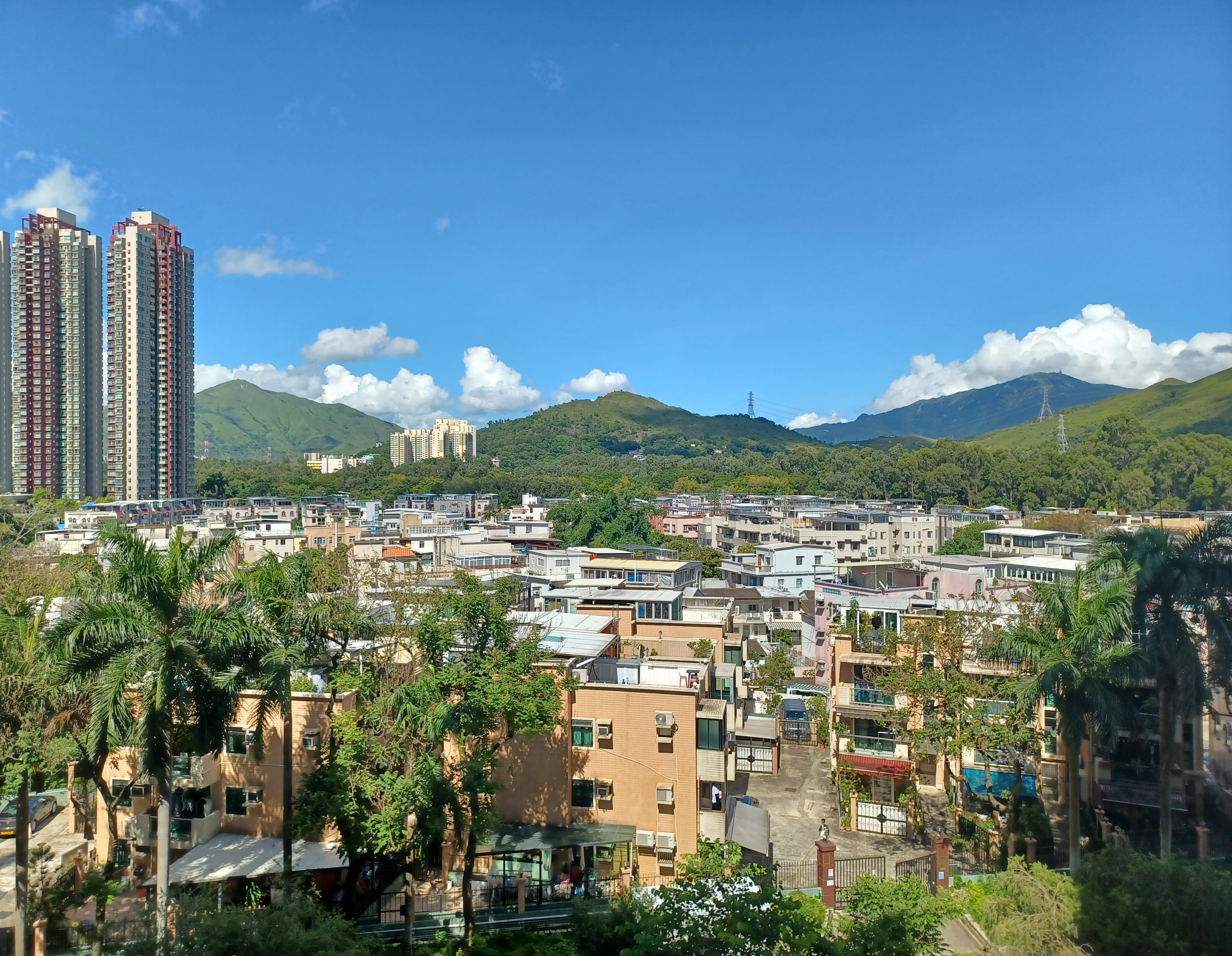
Sheung Yau Tin Tsuen.

Sheung Yau Tin Tsuen is a recognized village under the New Territories Small House Policy. For district councils electoral purposes, Sheung Yau Tin Tsuen was part of the Shap Pat Heung Central constituency in 2019.

== See also ==
- Ha Yau Tin Tsuen
