= Hung Tso Tin Tsuen =

Village in Yuen Long District, Hong Kong

Coordinates: 22.424911°N 114.030526°E

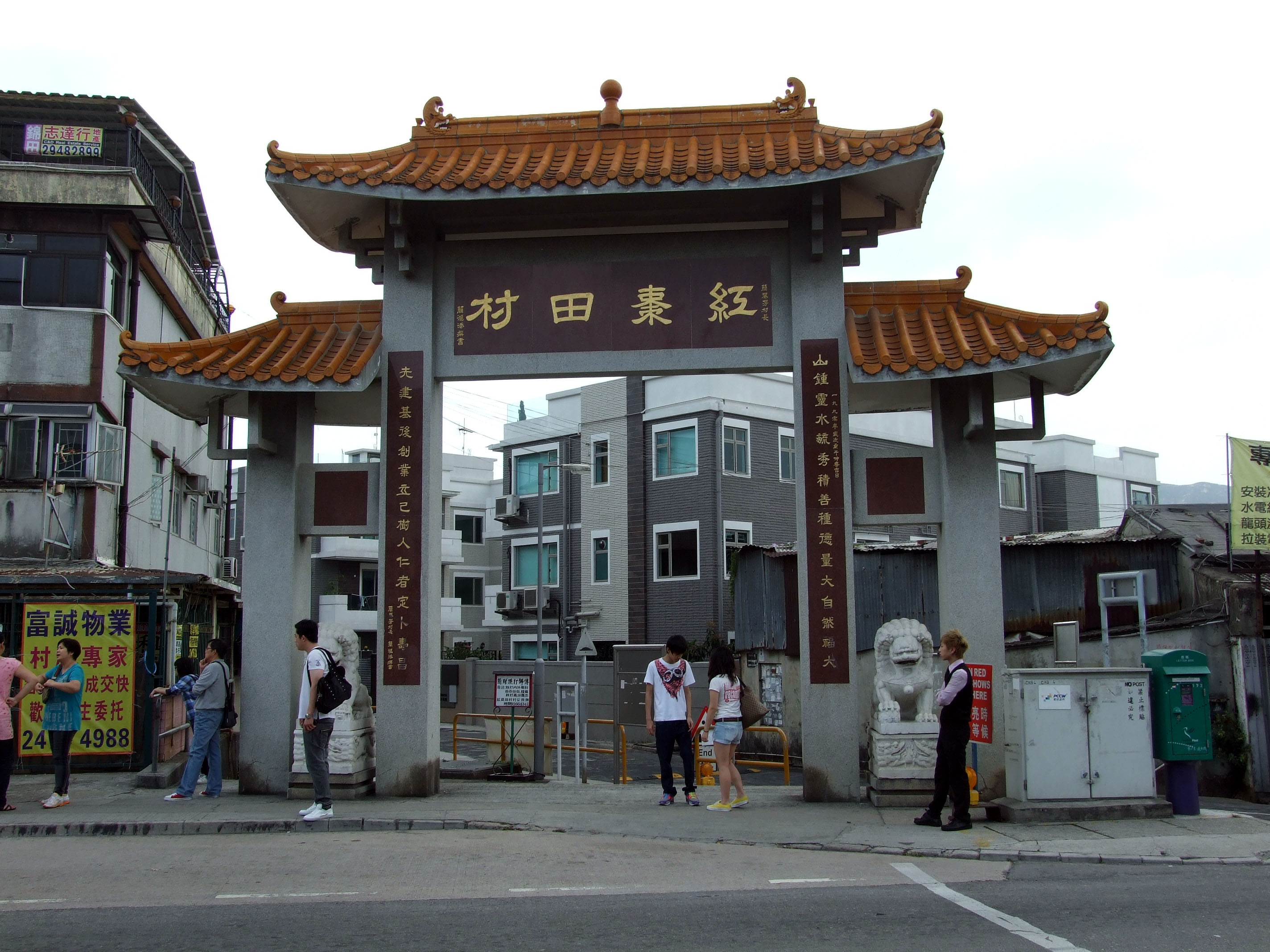
Paifang of Hung Tso Tin Tsuen

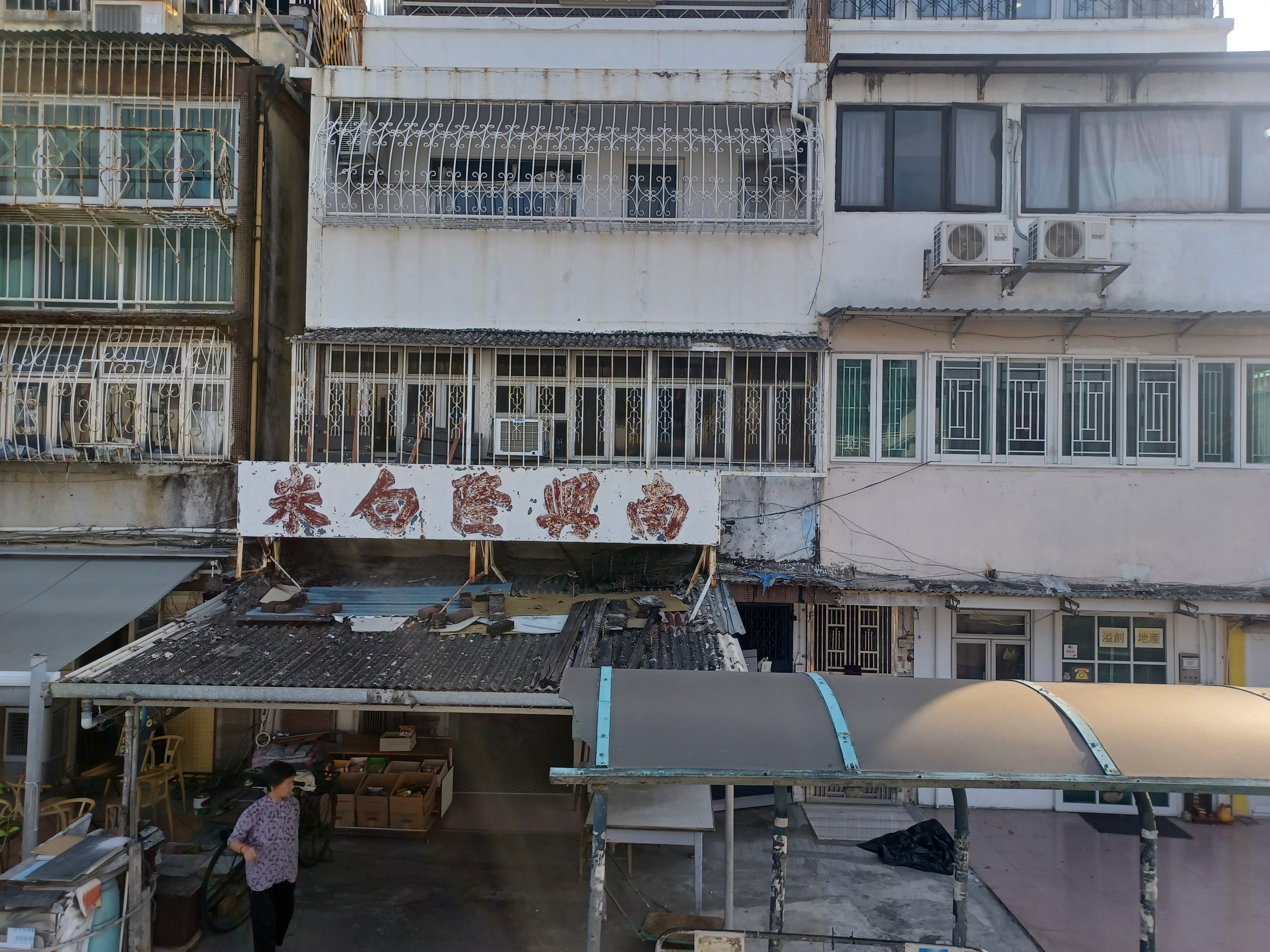
Hung Tso Tin Tsuen

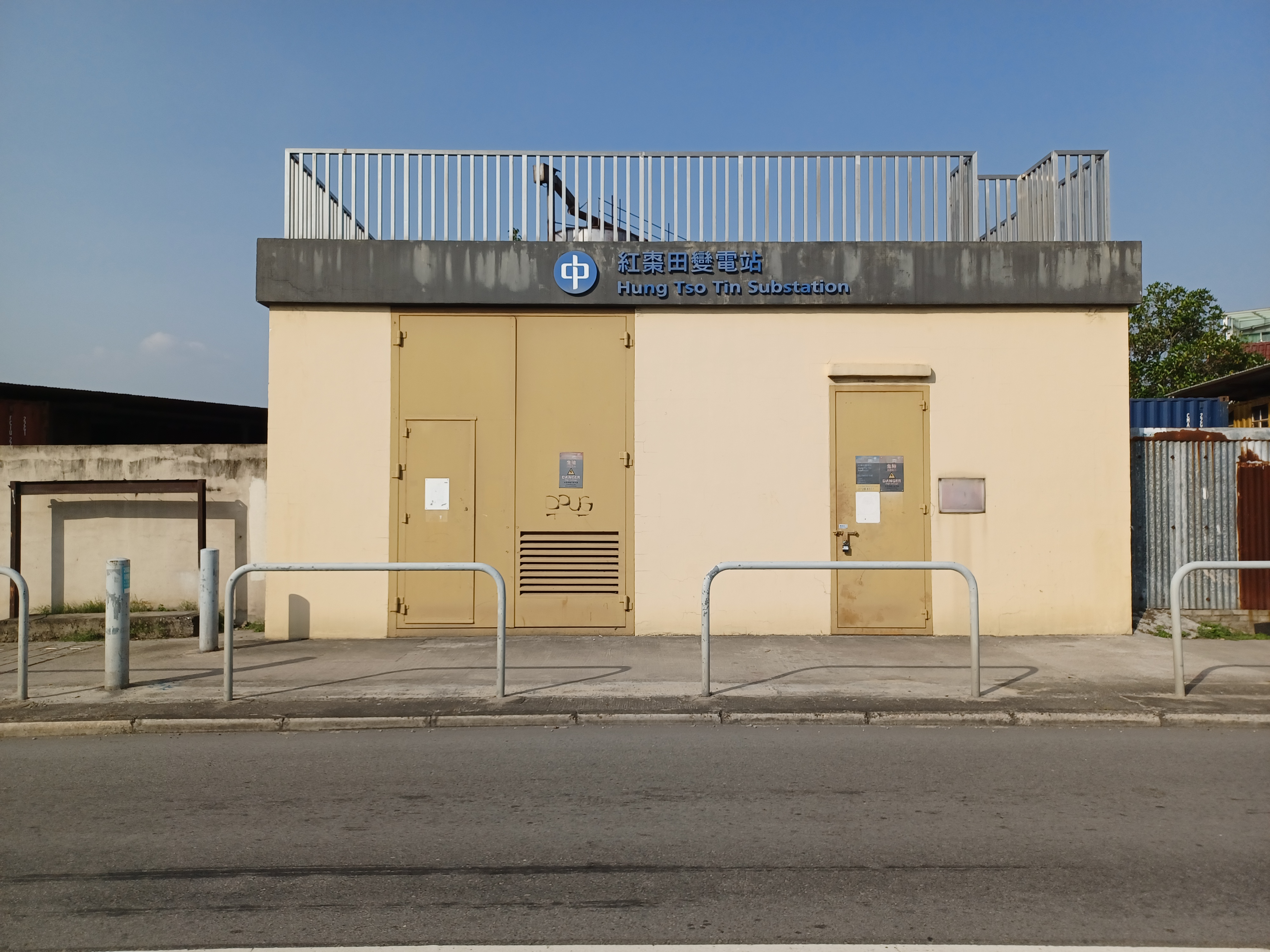
Hung Tso Tin Substation

Hung Tso Tin Tsuen (Chinese: 紅棗田村) is a village in the Shap Pat Heung area of Yuen Long District, Hong Kong.

== Administration ==
Hung Tso Tin Tsuen is a recognized village under the New Territories Small House Policy.
