= Lung Tin Tsuen =

Village of Hong Kong

Coordinates: 22.438188°N 114.024817°E

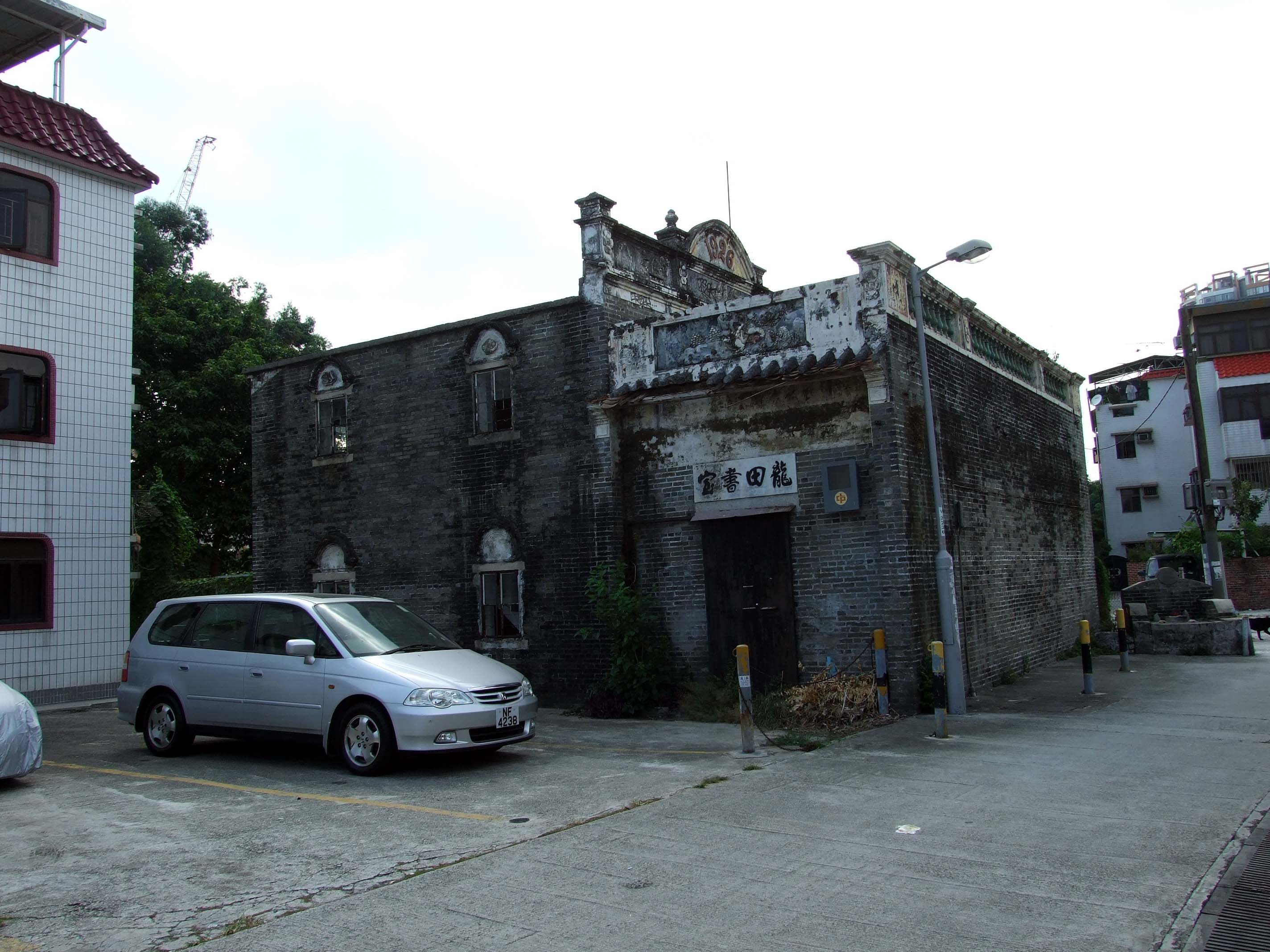
Lung Tin Study Hall in Lung Tin Tsuen.

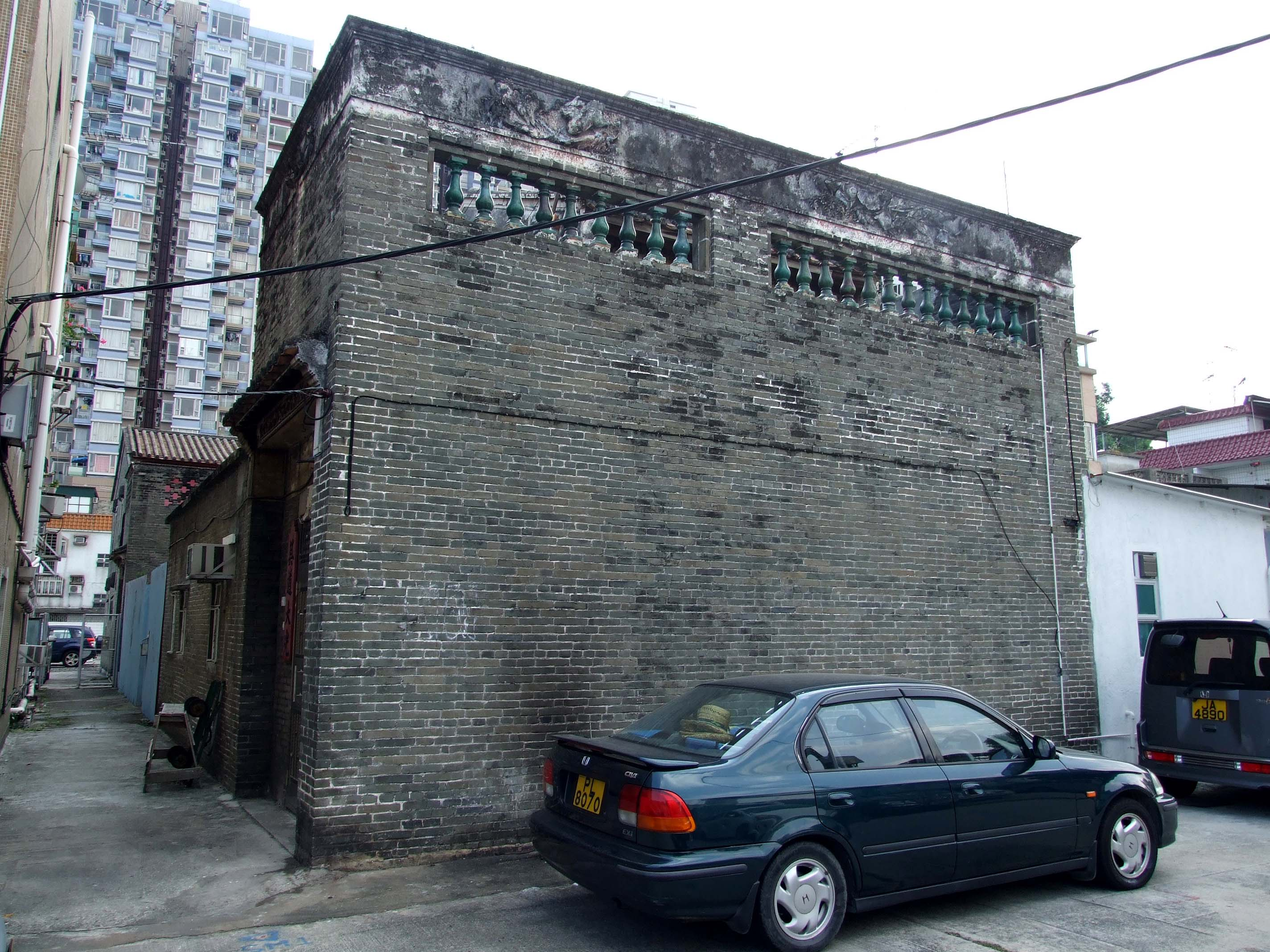
No. 21 Lung Tin Tsuen.

Lung Tin Tsuen (Chinese: 龍田村) is a village in the Shap Pat Heung area of Yuen Long District, Hong Kong.

== Administration ==
Lung Tin Tsuen is a recognized village under the New Territories Small House Policy.

== Education ==
Lung Tin Tsuen is in Primary One Admission (POA) School Net 73. Within the school net are multiple aided schools (operated independently but funded with government money) and one government school: South Yuen Long Government Primary School (南元朗官立小學).
