= Tong Tau Po Tsuen =

Tong Tau Po Tsuen 塘頭埔
- Village
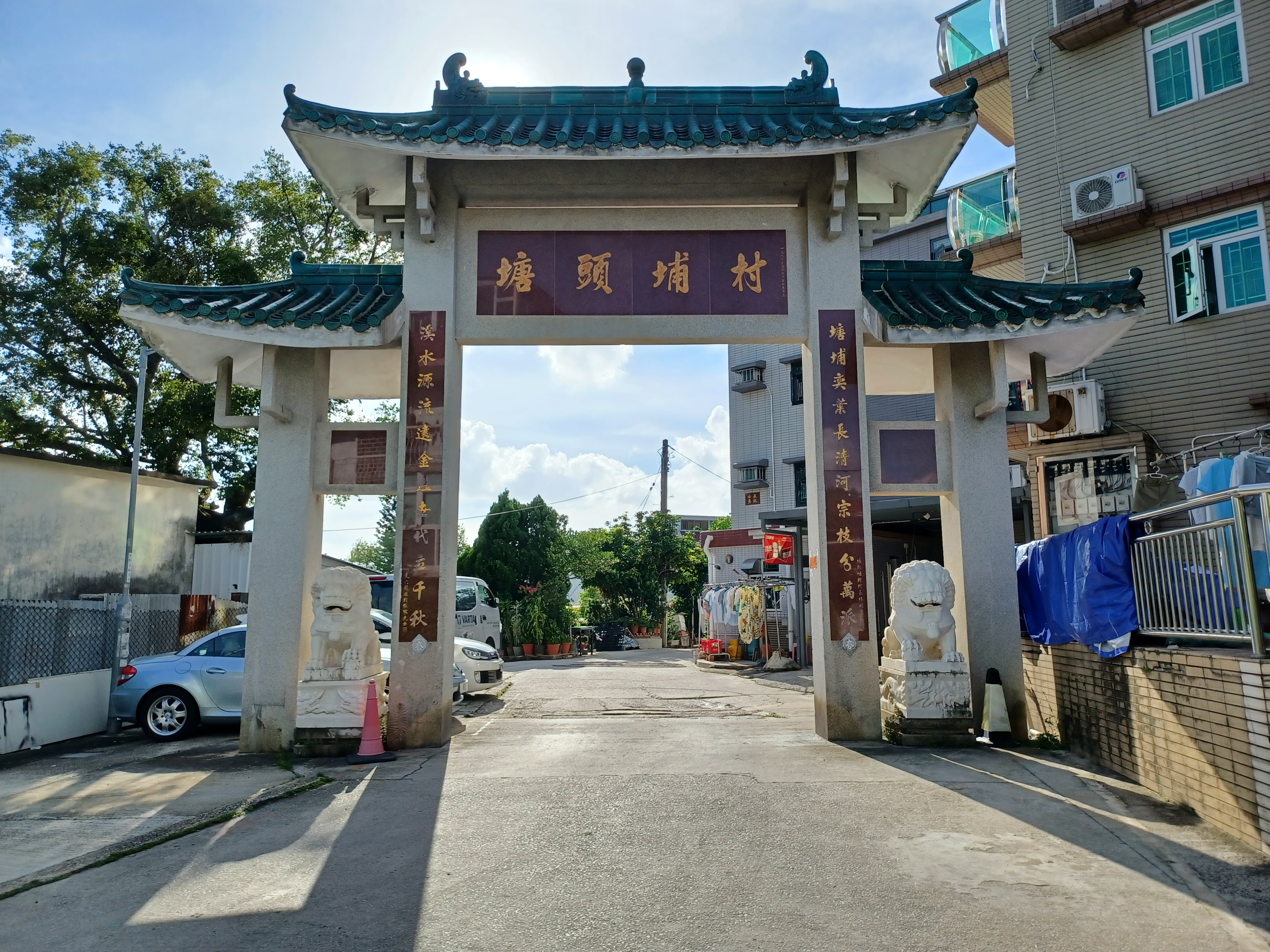
- Paifang of Tong Tau Po Tsuen.

- Location in Hong Kong
- Coordinates: 22.427029°N 114.036369°E
- Sovereign state: China
- SAR: Hong Kong
- District: Yuen Long District

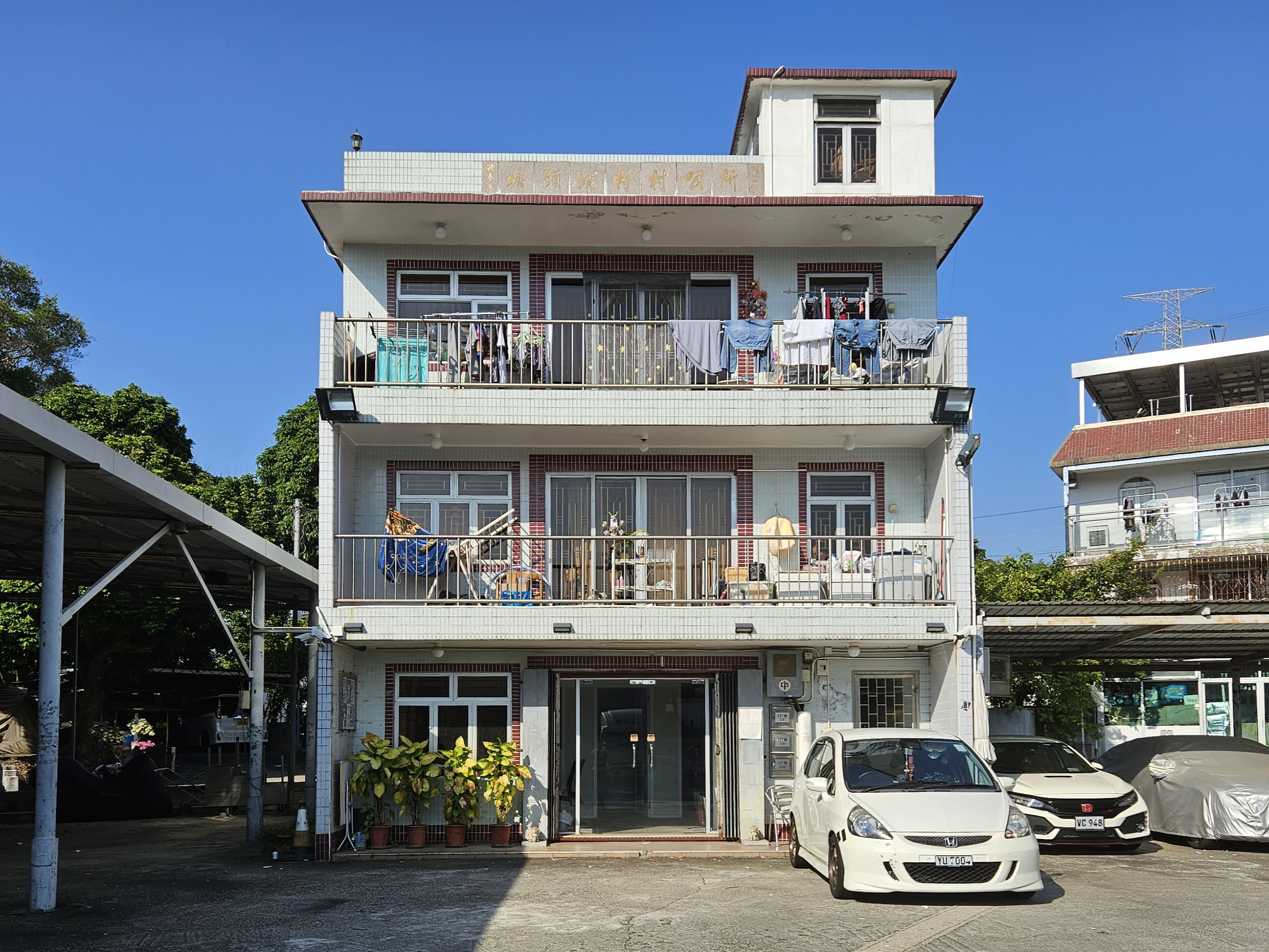
Tong Tau Po Village Office in November 2023

Tong Tau Po Tsuen (Chinese: 塘頭埔) is a village in the Shap Pat Heung area of Yuen Long District, Hong Kong.

== Administration ==
Tong Tau Po Tsuen is a recognized village under the New Territories Small House Policy. It is one of the villages represented within the Shap Pat Heung Rural Committee. For electoral purposes, Tong Tau Po Tsuen is part of the Shap Pat Heung East constituency, which was formerly represented by Lee Chun-wai until July 2021.

== History ==
At the time of the 1911 census, the population of Tong Tau Po was 116. The number of males was 53.
