= Shui Tsiu San Tsuen =

Village in Hong Kong

Coordinates: 22.425116°N 114.027943°E

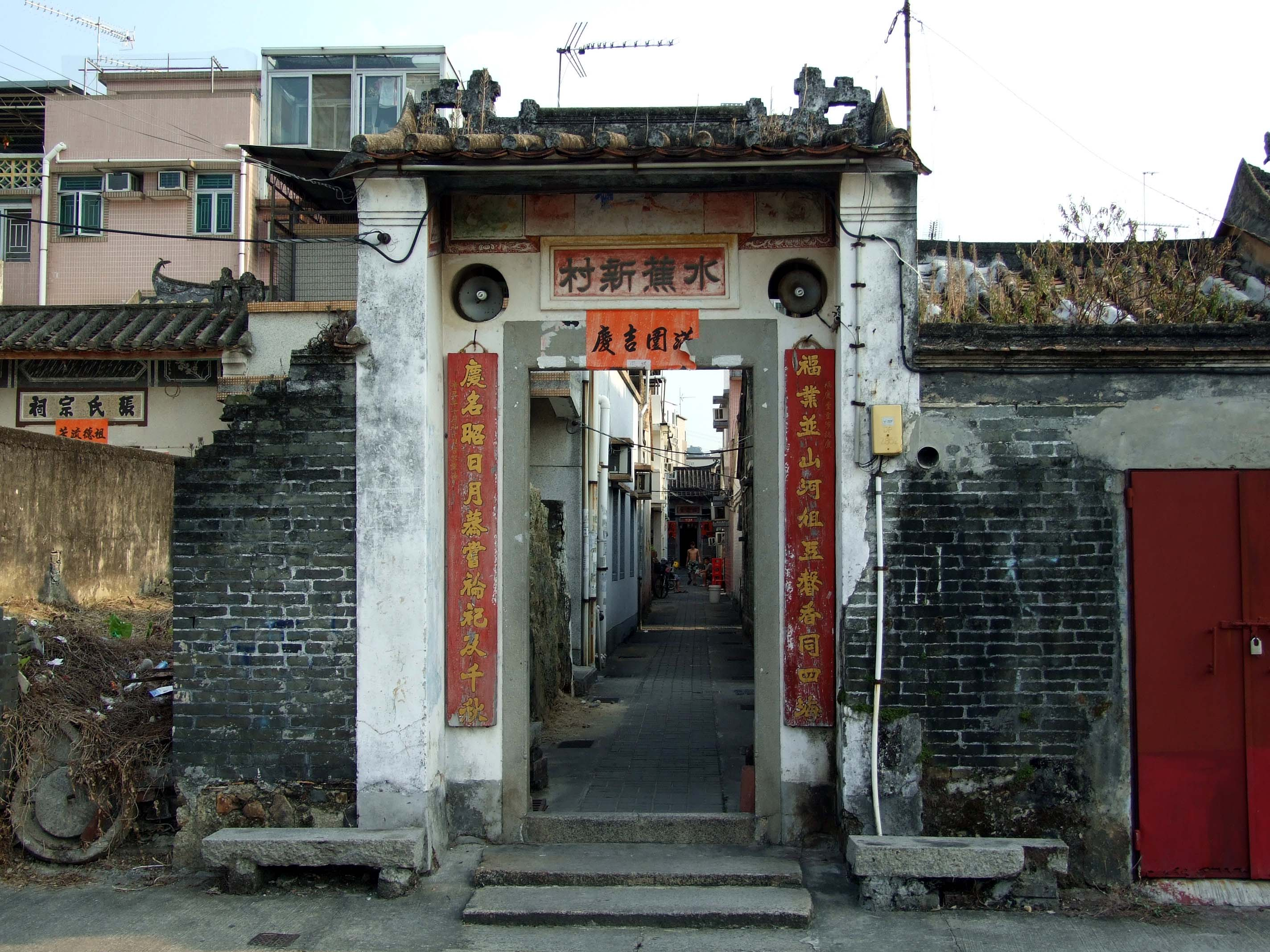
Entrance gate of the walled village in October 2012

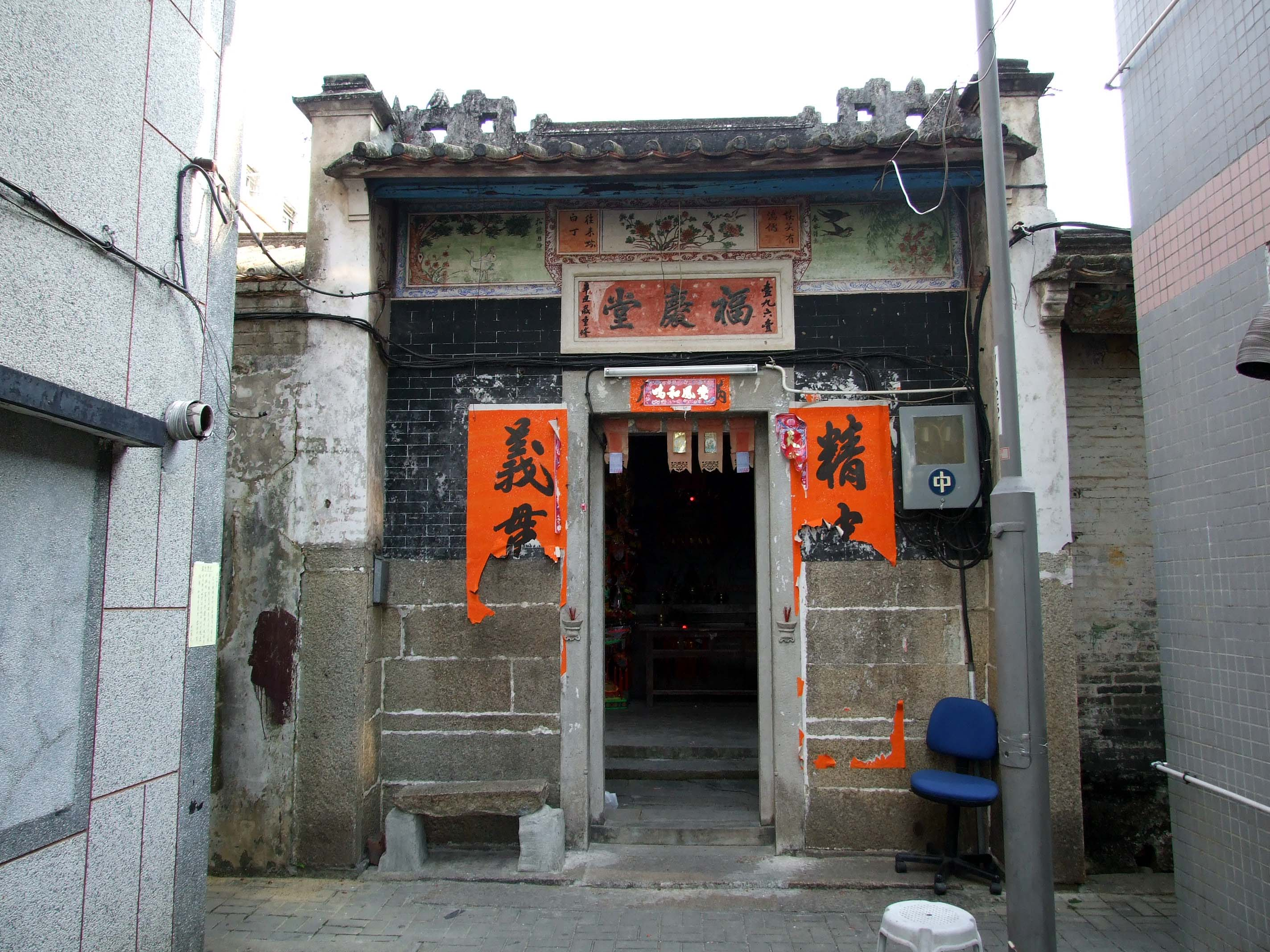
Fuk Hing Tong (福慶堂) is the shrine of the walled village. It serves as the common ancestral hall and for the worship of Kwan Tai. Taken in October 2012.

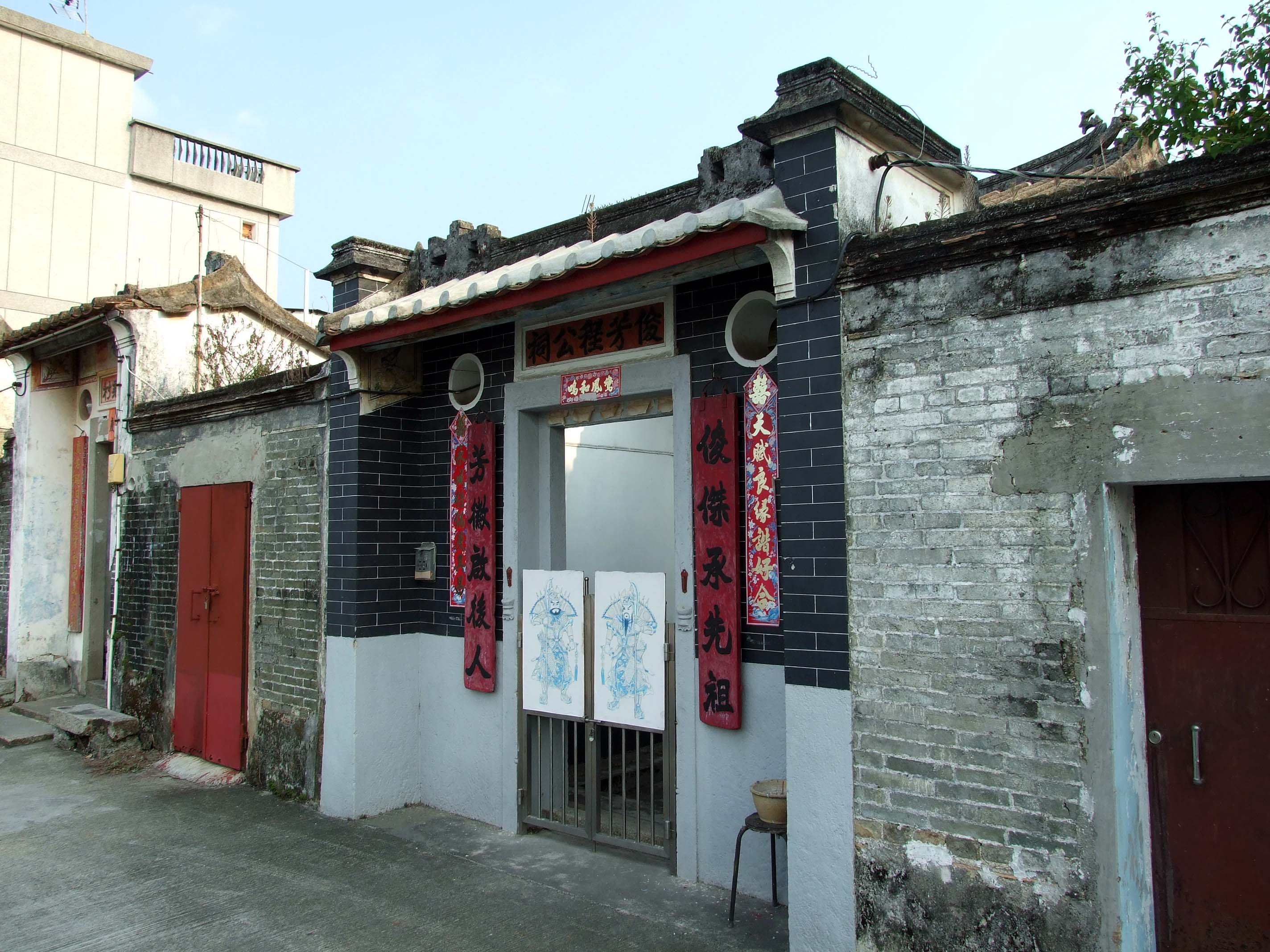
Ching Chun Fong Ancestral Hall (俊芳程公祠).

Shui Tsiu San Tsuen (Chinese: 水蕉新村) is a village in Shap Pat Heung, Yuen Long District, Hong Kong. Part of the village is a historic walled village.

== Administration ==
Shui Tsiu San Tsuen is a recognized village under the New Territories Small House Policy.

== History ==
Shui Tsiu San Tsuen was a Hakka village inhabited by the Yeung (楊) and the Wong (黃) who worked for the Tang Clan as early as the mid-17th century. They were later joined by the Ching (程), the Lam (林) and the Cheung (張).

== See also ==
- Walled villages of Hong Kong
- Shui Tsiu Lo Wai
