= Ha Yau Tin Tsuen =

Village in Hong Kong

Coordinates: 22.439297°N 114.036619°E

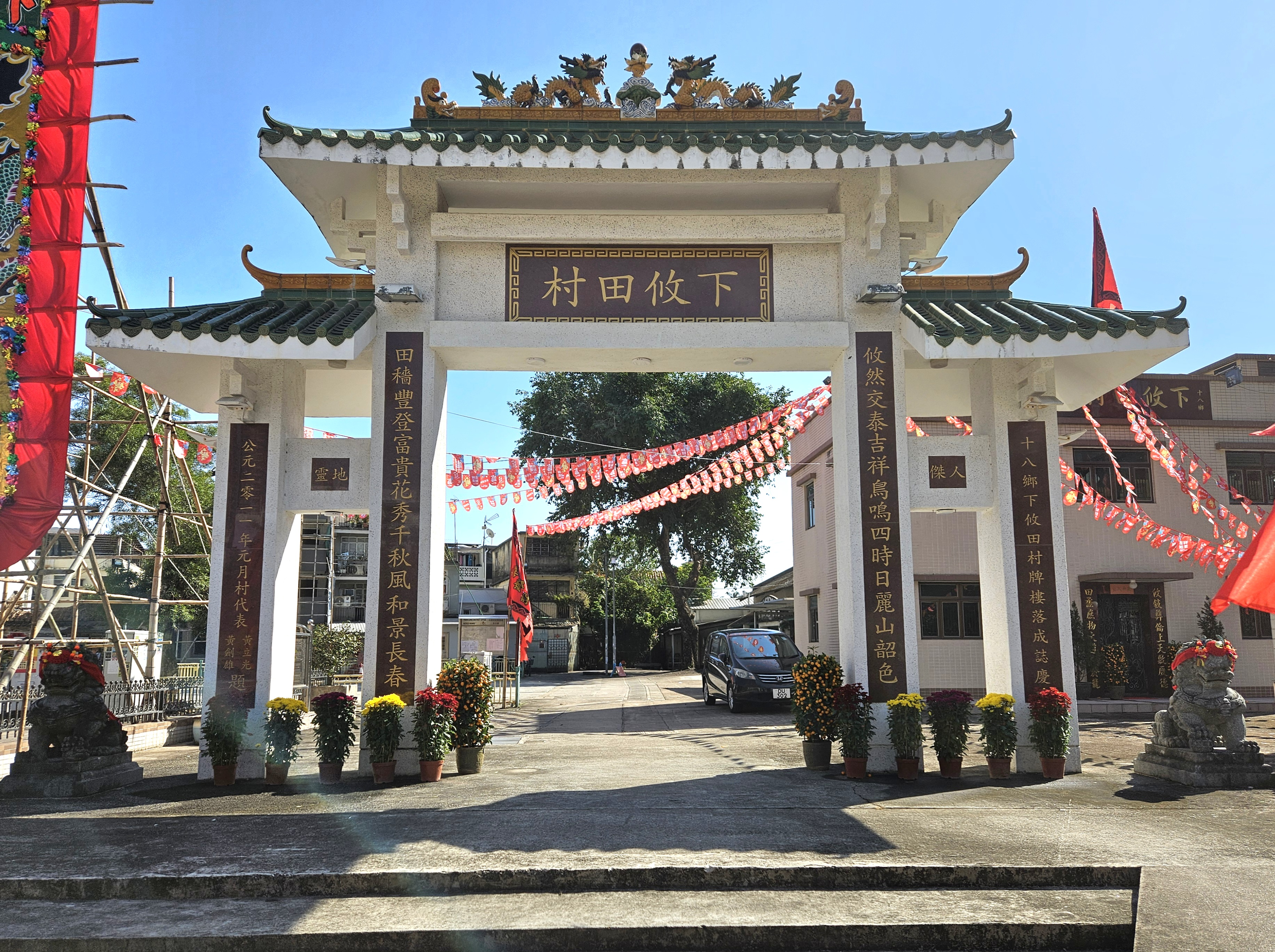
Paifang of Ha Yau Tin Tsuen in February 2024.

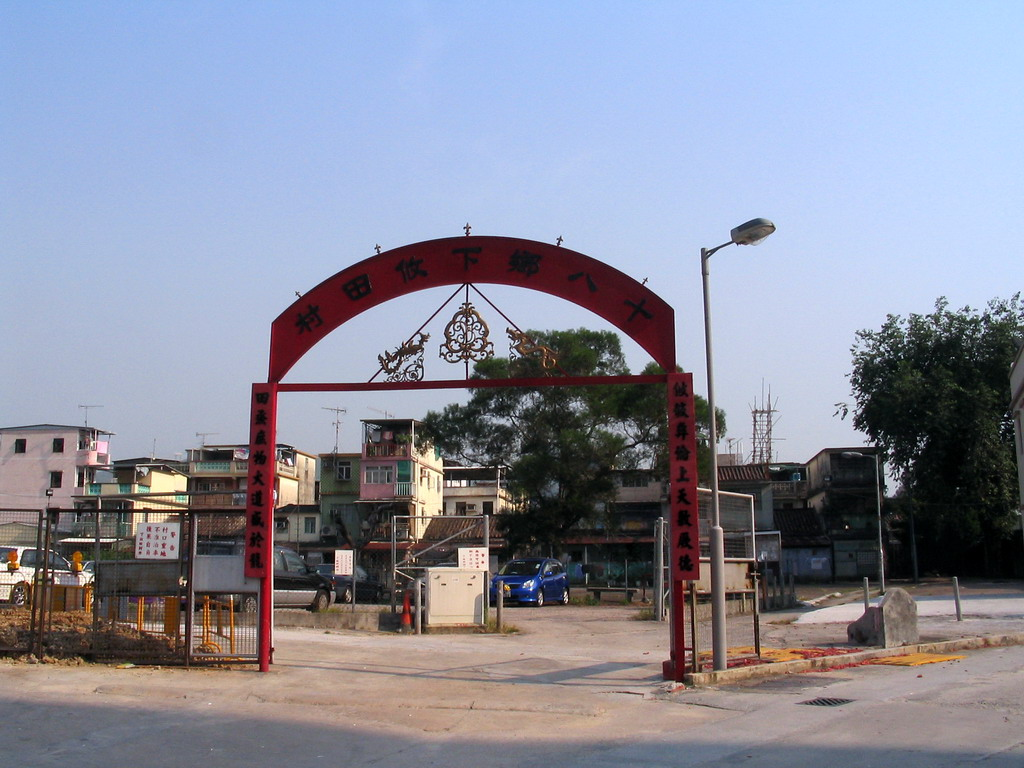
The old gate of Ha Yau Tin Tsuen in October 2007, which was later replaced by a paifang.

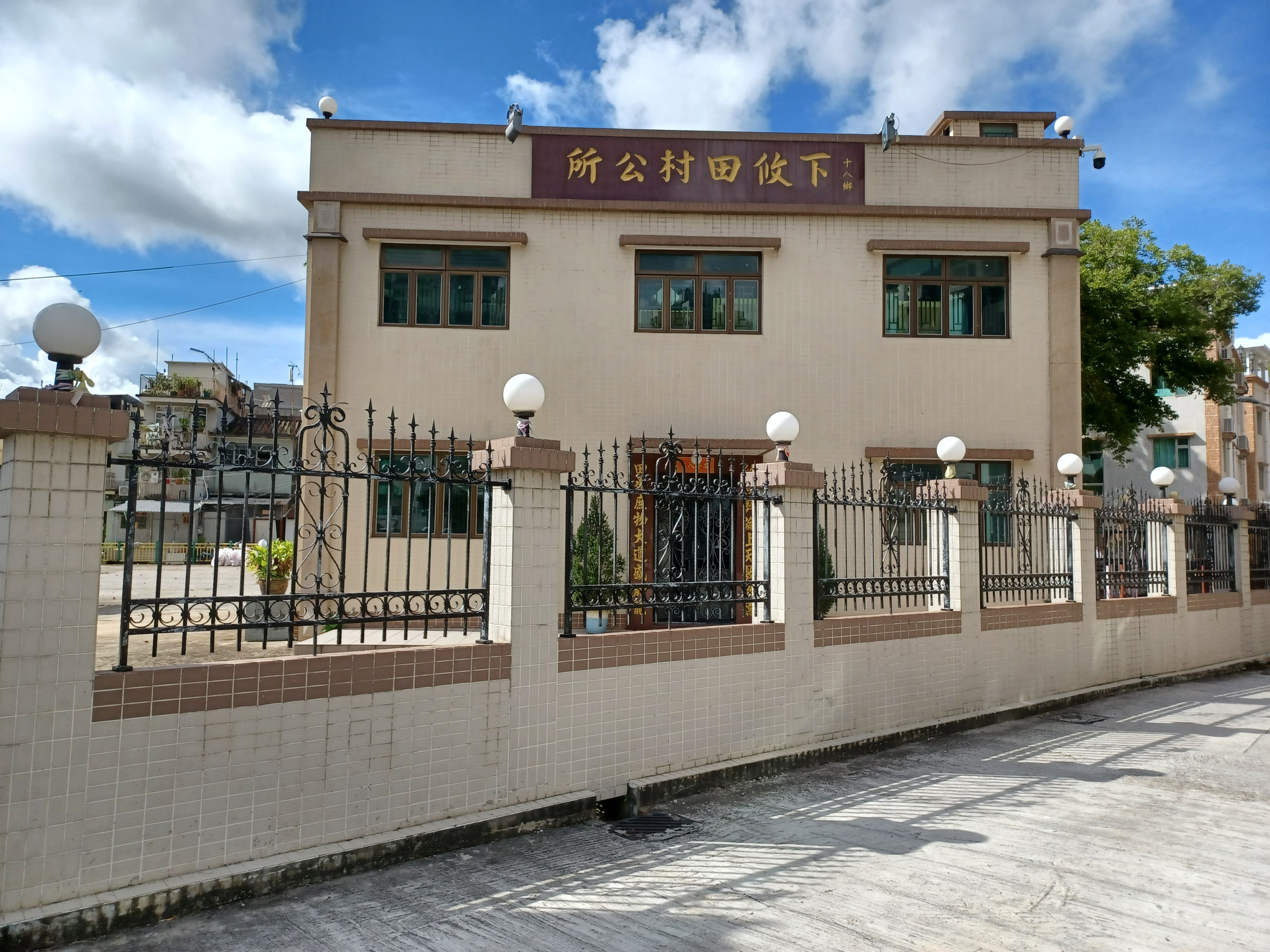
Ha Yau Tin Village Office.

Ha Yau Tin Tsuen (Chinese: 下攸田) is a village in the Shap Pat Heung area of Yuen Long District, Hong Kong.

== Administration ==
Ha Yau Tin Tsuen is a recognized village under the New Territories Small House Policy. For district councils electoral purposes, Ha Yau Tin Tsuen was part of the Shap Pat Heung Central constituency in 2019.

== See also ==
- Sheung Yau Tin Tsuen
