= Tai Kei Leng =

Village in Hong Kong

Coordinates: 22.43987°N 114.03072°E

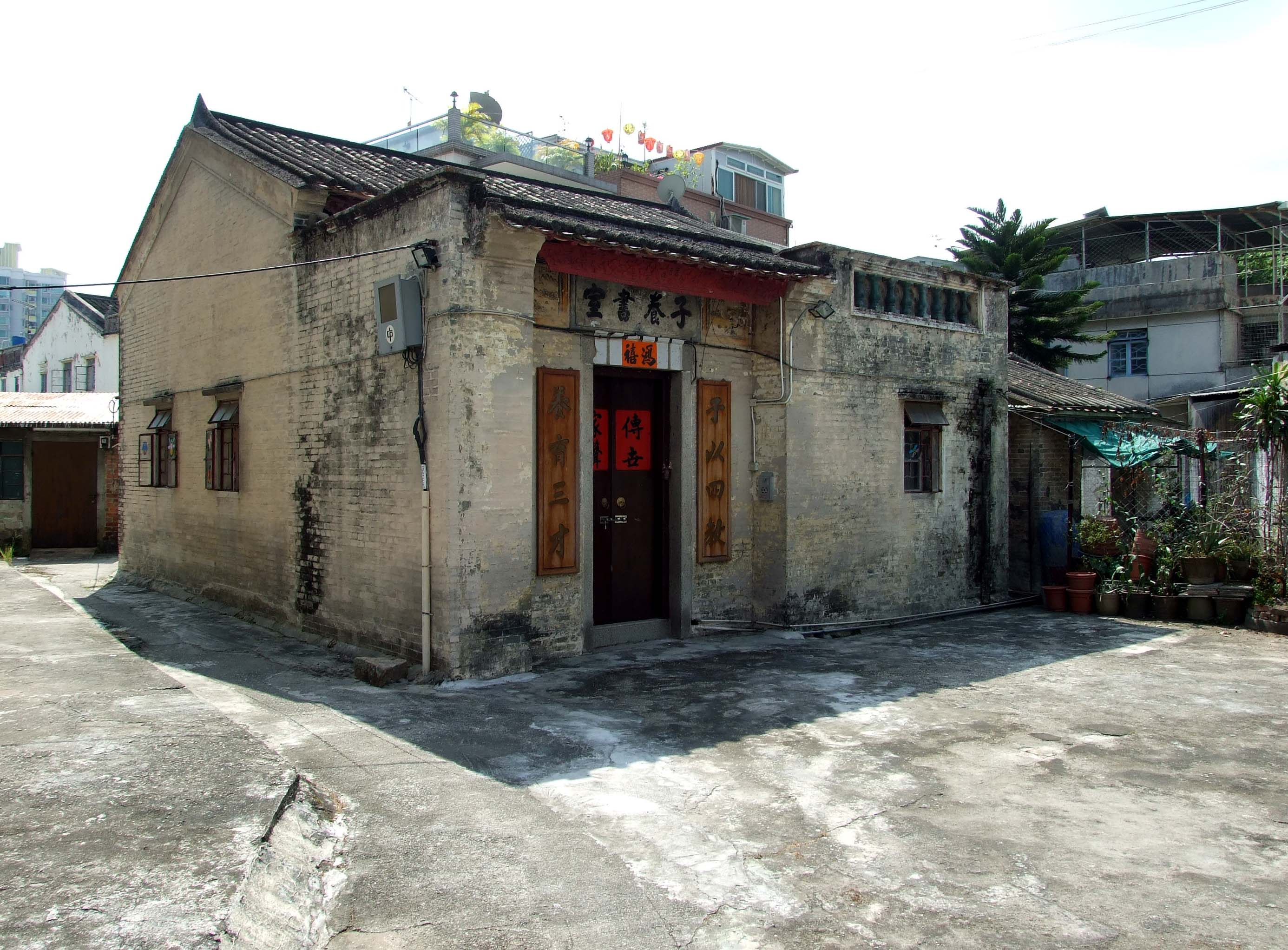
Ji Yeung Study Hall in Tai Kei Leng

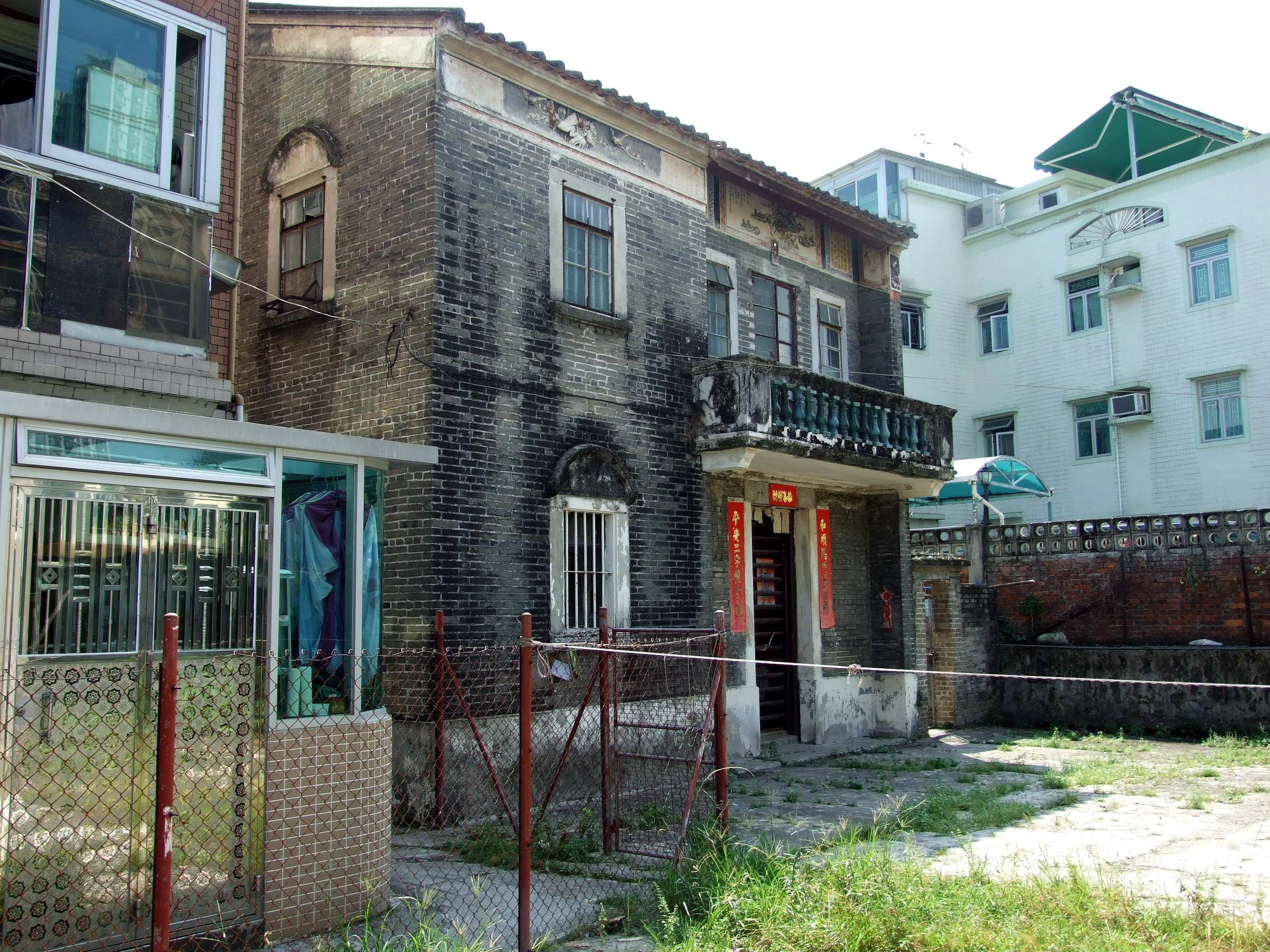
No. 112 Tai Kei Leng

Tai Kei Leng (Chinese: 大旗嶺) is a village in Shap Pat Heung, Yuen Long District, Hong Kong.

== Features ==
Several buildings in the village have been listed as Grade III historic buildings: they are the houses at Nos. 26, 27, 45, 112, 119, 173, 186 and 188, Siu Lo (筱廬) at No. 643, as well as the Ji Yeung Study Hall (子養書室) at No. 23 of the village.

== Education ==
Tai Kei Leng is divided between Primary One Admission (POA) School Net 73 and POA School Net 74. Within POA 73 are multiple aided schools (operated independently but funded with government money) and one government school: South Yuen Long Government Primary School (南元朗官立小學). POA 74 has multiple aided schools and one government school: Yuen Long Government Primary School (元朗官立小學).
