= Shap Pat Heung =

Human settlement in Hong Kong

- Traditional Chinese: 十八鄉
- Simplified Chinese: 十八乡
Transcriptions
Standard Mandarin
- Hanyu Pinyin: Shíbāxiāng
Yue: Cantonese
- Yale Romanization: Sahp baat hēung
- Jyutping: Sap6 baat3 hoeng1

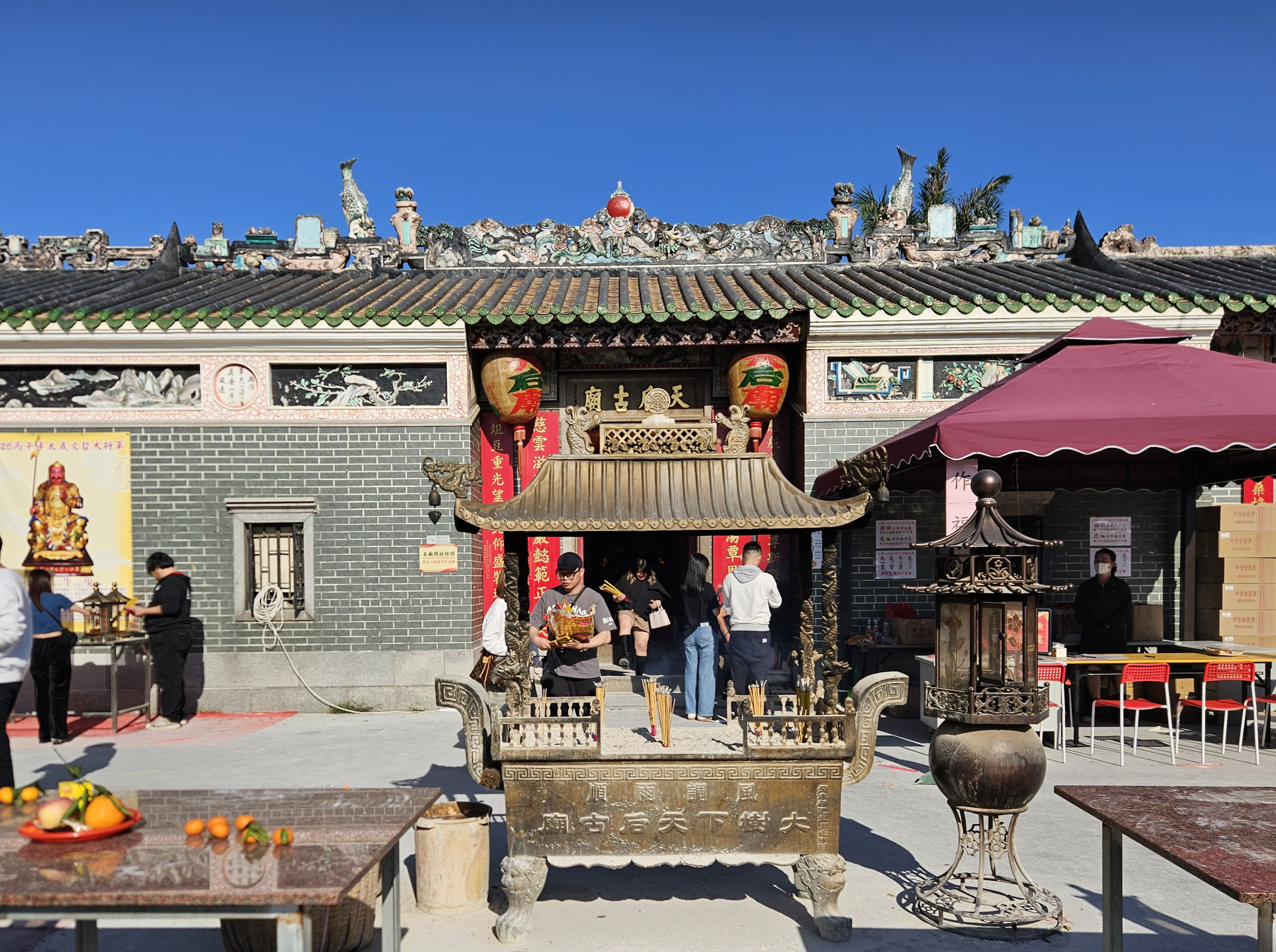
Tin Hau Temple in Tai Kei Leng, Shap Pat Heung

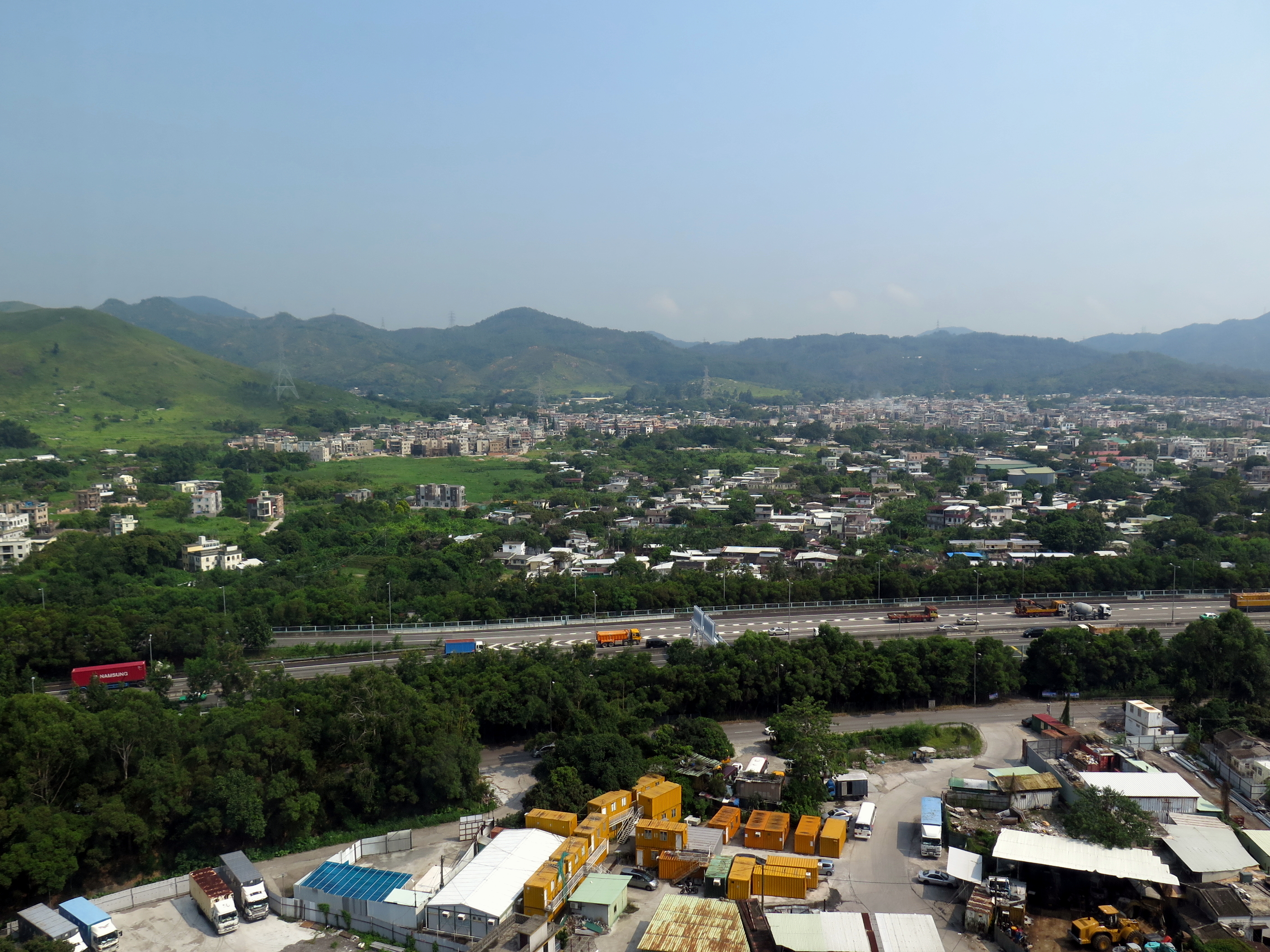
Shap Pat Heung.

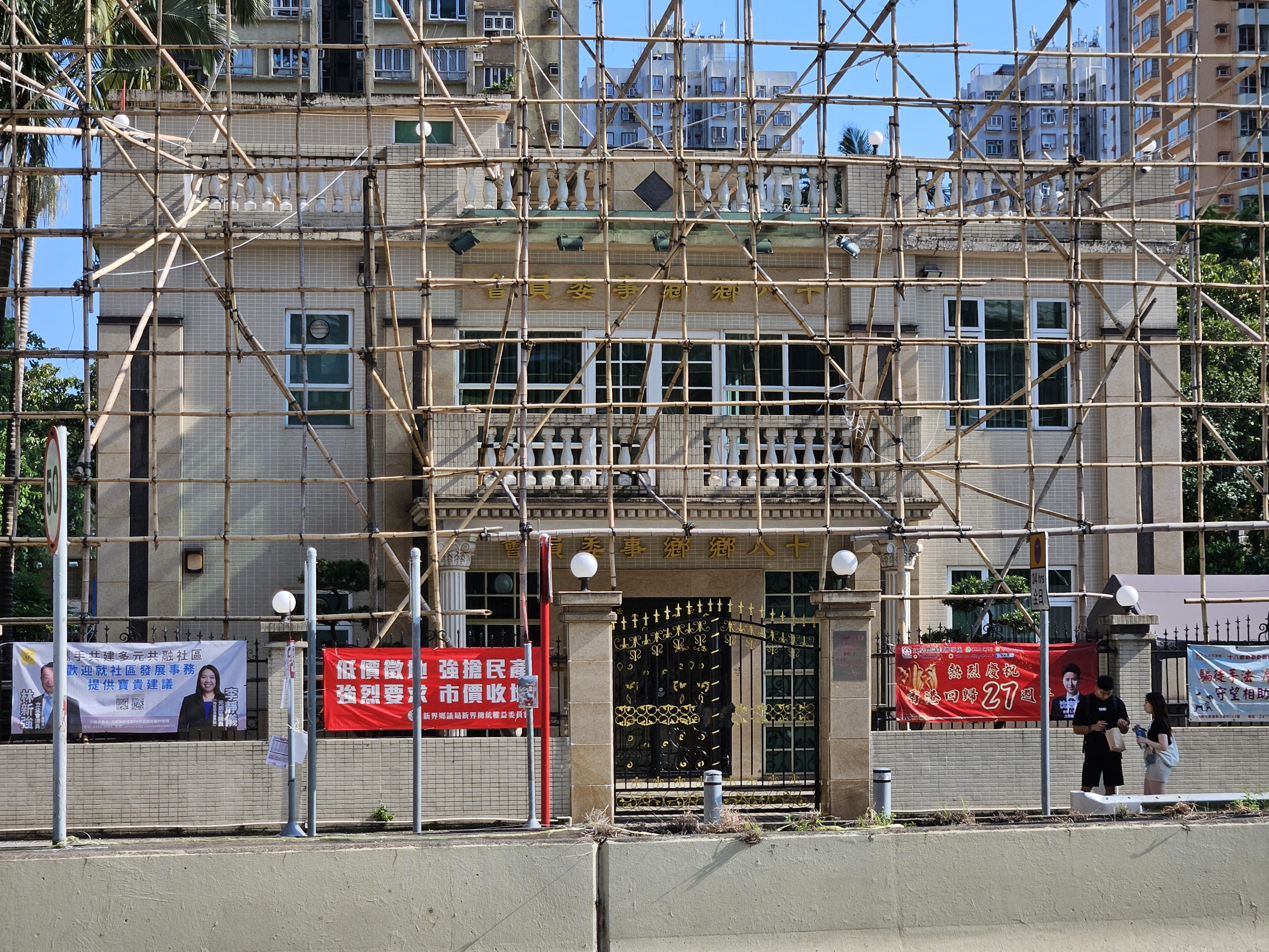
Shap Pat Heung Rural committee.

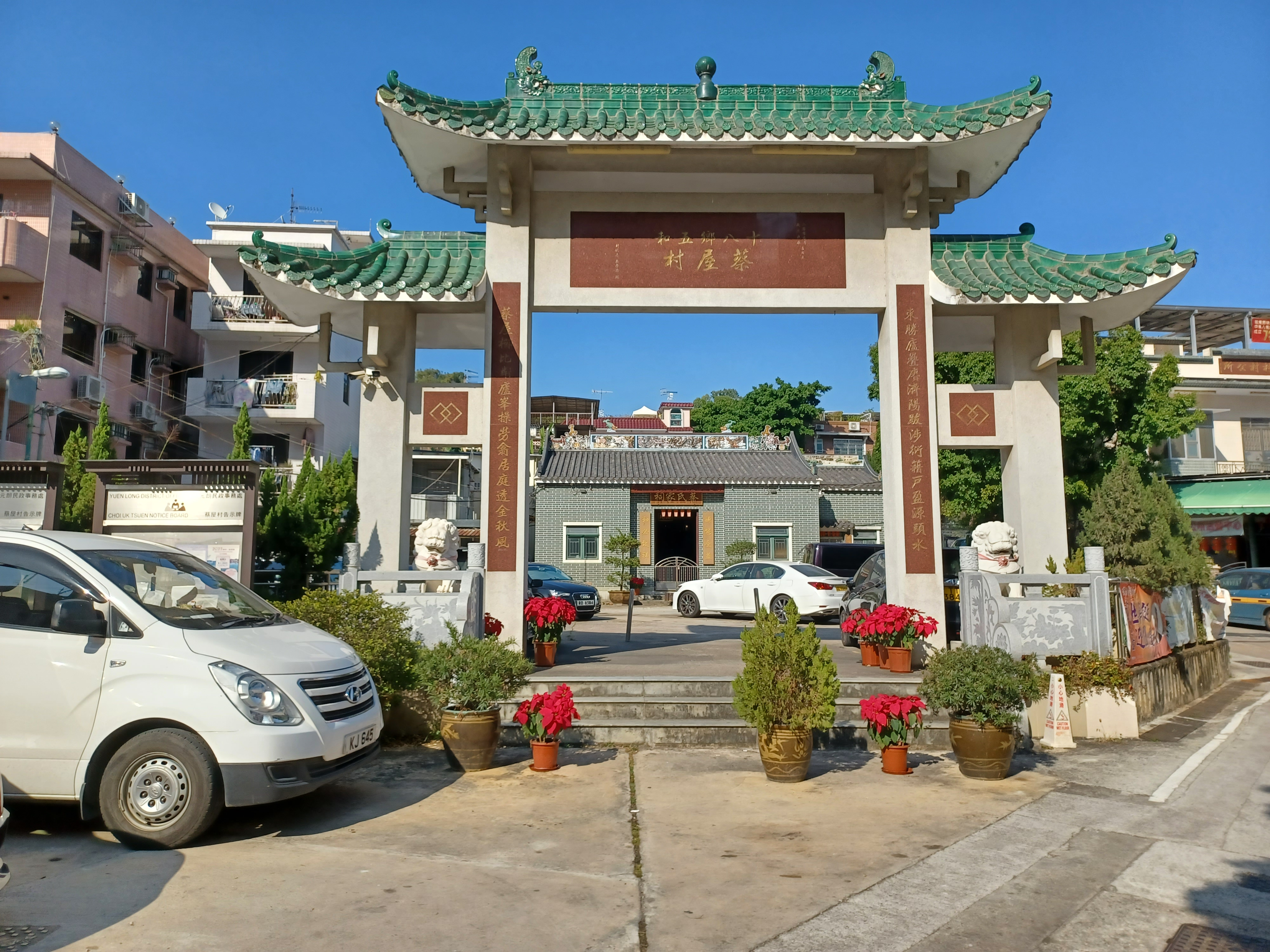
Village gate and ancestral hall in Choi Uk Tsuen, Shap Pat Heung.

Shap Pat Heung is an area in the New Territories of Hong Kong. Located south of Yuen Long and northeast of Tai Tong, the area occupies the plain north of hills of Tai Lam. The Cantonese name 'Shap Pat Heung' means 'eighteen villages' at its beginning. It was later expanded to thirty villages. Administratively, it is part of the Yuen Long District.

The area is famous for the celebration of Tin Hau Festival on the 23rd day of the 3rd month every year of Chinese calendar. Parade and Fa Pao attracts many visitors and pilgrims from other villages and towns.

== List of villages ==
1. Tai Tong Tsuen (大棠村)
2. Shan Pui Tsuen (山貝村)
3. Tai Wai Tsuen (大圍村) (五和) (Yuen Long Kau Hui)
4. Ha Yau Tin Tsuen (下攸田)
5. Sheung Yau Tin Tsuen (上攸田)
6. Tai Kiu Tsuen (大橋村)
7. Muk Kiu Tau Tsuen (木橋頭)
8. Shui Tsiu Lo Wai (水蕉老圍)
9. Shui Tsiu San Tsuen (水蕉新村)
10. Nga Yiu Tau Tsuen (瓦窰頭)
11. Pak Sha Tsuen (白沙村)
12. Tin Liu Tsuen (田寮村)
13. Sai Pin Wai (西邊圍) (Yuen Long Kau Hui)
14. Tung Tau Tsuen (東頭村) (五和) (Yuen Long Kau Hui)
15. Nam Pin Wai (南邊圍) (Yuen Long Kau Hui)
16. Nam Hang Tsuen (南坑村)
17. Ying Lung Wai (英龍圍) (五和) (Yuen Long Kau Hui)
18. Hung Tso Tin Tsuen (紅棗田村)
19. Ma Tin Tsuen (馬田村)
20. Sham Chung Tsuen (深涌村)
21. Wong Uk Tsuen (黃屋村) (五和) (Yuen Long Kau Hui)
22. Wong Nai Tun Tsuen (黃泥墩)
23. Kong Tau Tsuen (港頭村)
24. Tong Tau Po Tsuen (塘頭埔)
25. Yeung Uk Tsuen (楊屋村)
26. Tsoi Uk Tsuen or Choi Uk Tsuen (蔡屋村) (五和) (Yuen Long Kau Hui)
27. Tai Kei Leng (大旗嶺)
28. Shan Pui Chung Hau Tsuen (山貝涌口)
29. Shung Ching San Tsuen (崇正新村)
30. Lung Tin Tsuen (龍田村)

== Education ==
Shap Pat Heung is in Primary One Admission (POA) School Net 74. Within the school net are multiple aided schools (operated independently but funded with government money) and one government school: Yuen Long Government Primary School (元朗官立小學).

== See also ==
- Shap Sze Heung
