= Sham Chung Tsuen =

Village in Hong Kong

Coordinates: 22.433224°N 114.027382°E

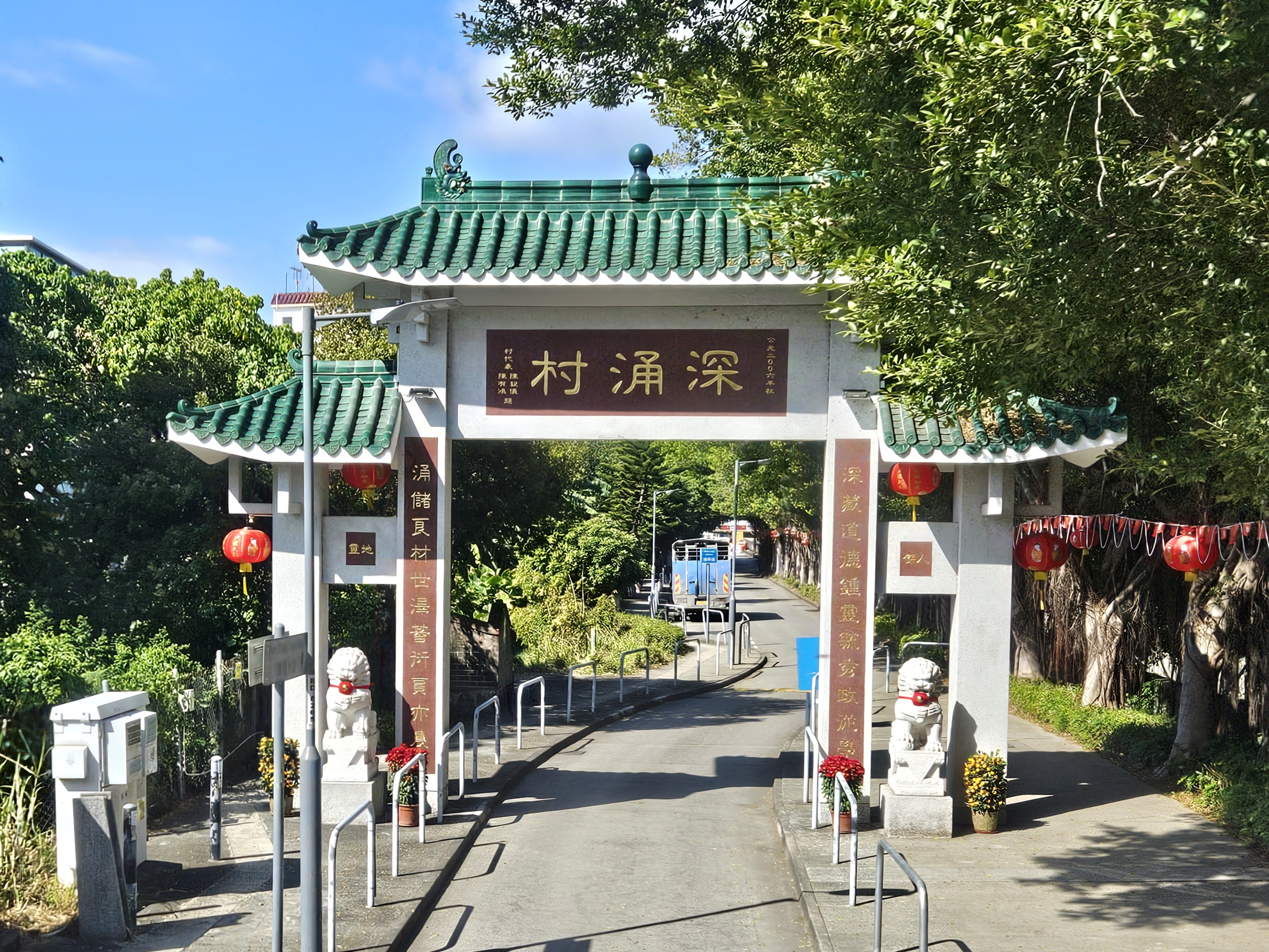
Sham Chung Tsuen archway.

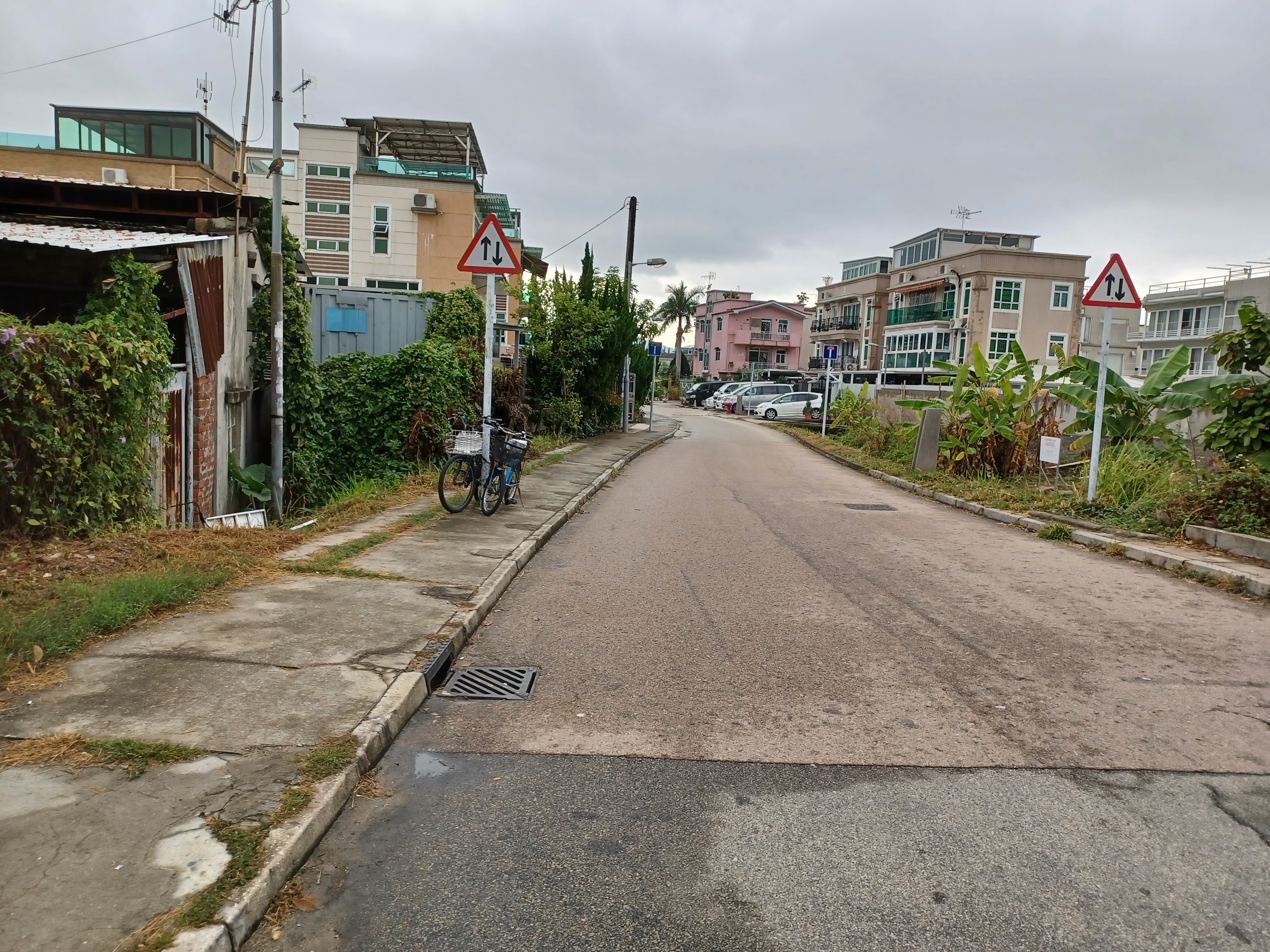
Sham Chung Road in Sham Chung Tsuen.

Sham Chung Tsuen (Chinese: 深涌村) is a village in Shap Pat Heung, Yuen Long District, Hong Kong.

== Administration ==
Sham Chung Tsuen is a recognized village under the New Territories Small House Policy.

== See also ==
- Tin Liu Tsuen, a village adjacent to Sham Chung Tsuen, to its west
