= Tin Liu Tsuen =

Walled village in Shap Pat Heung, Hong Kong

Coordinates: 22.432659°N 114.024738°E

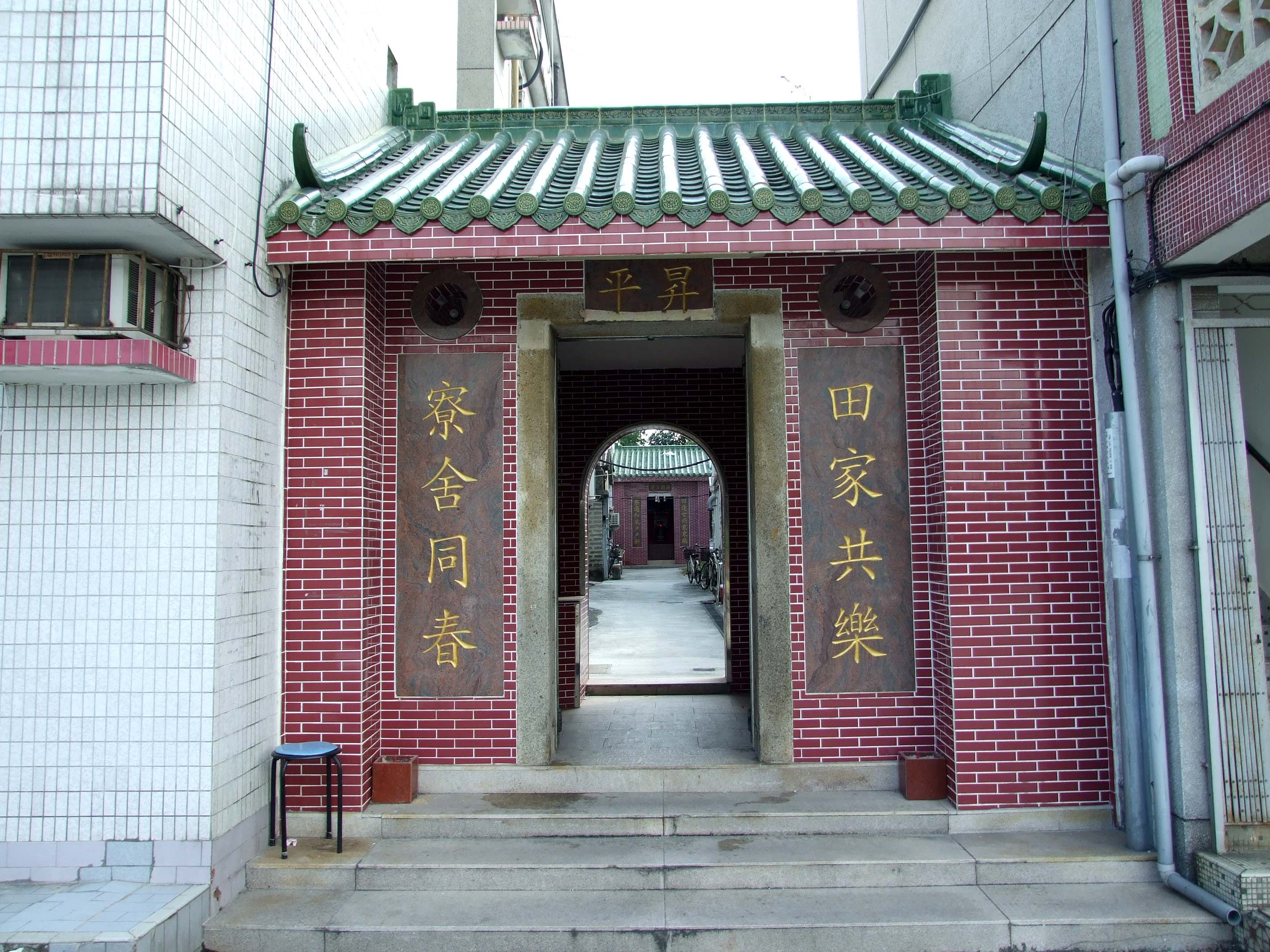
Entrance gate of Tin Liu Tsuen

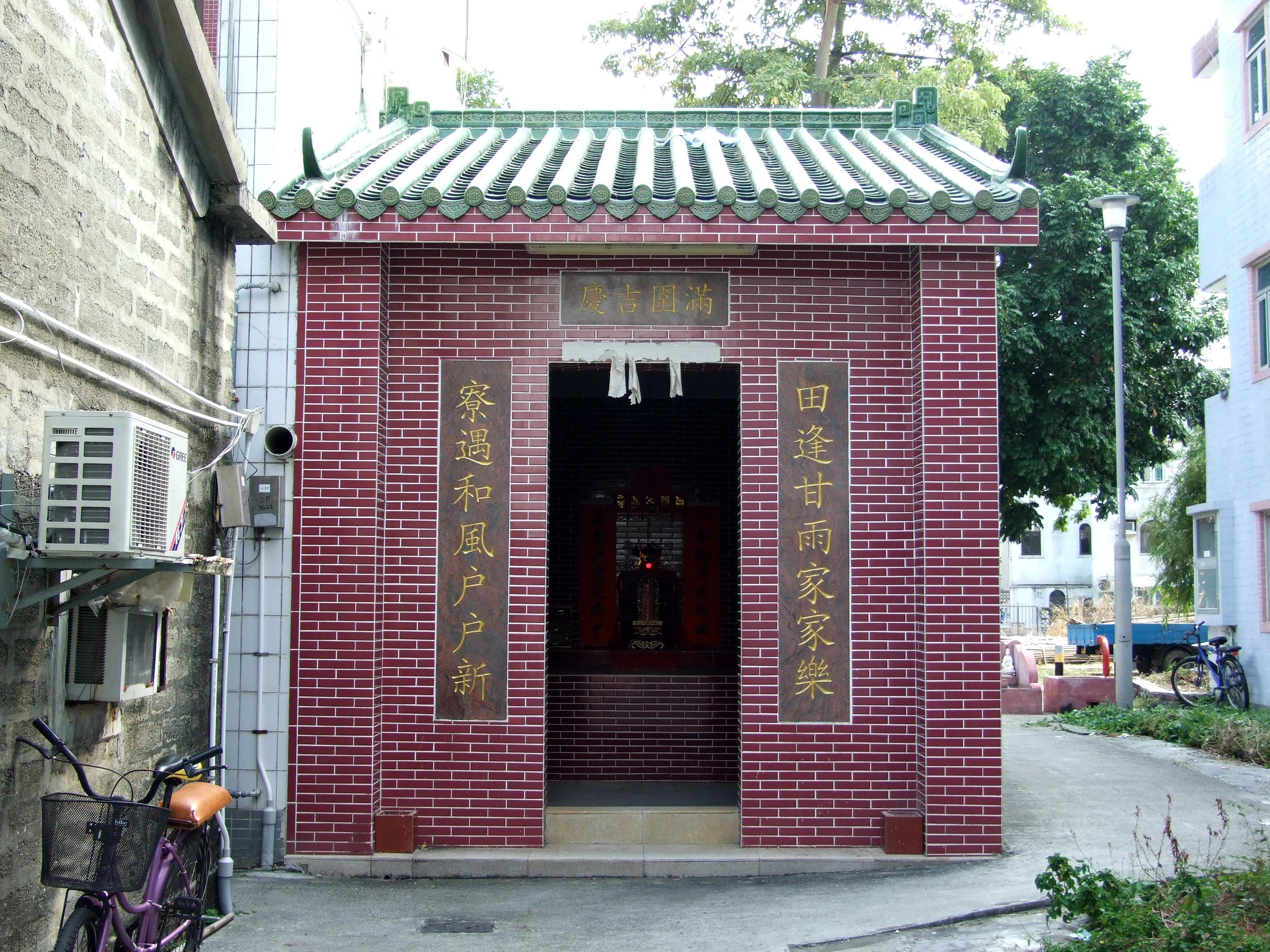
Main shrine of Tin Liu Tsuen

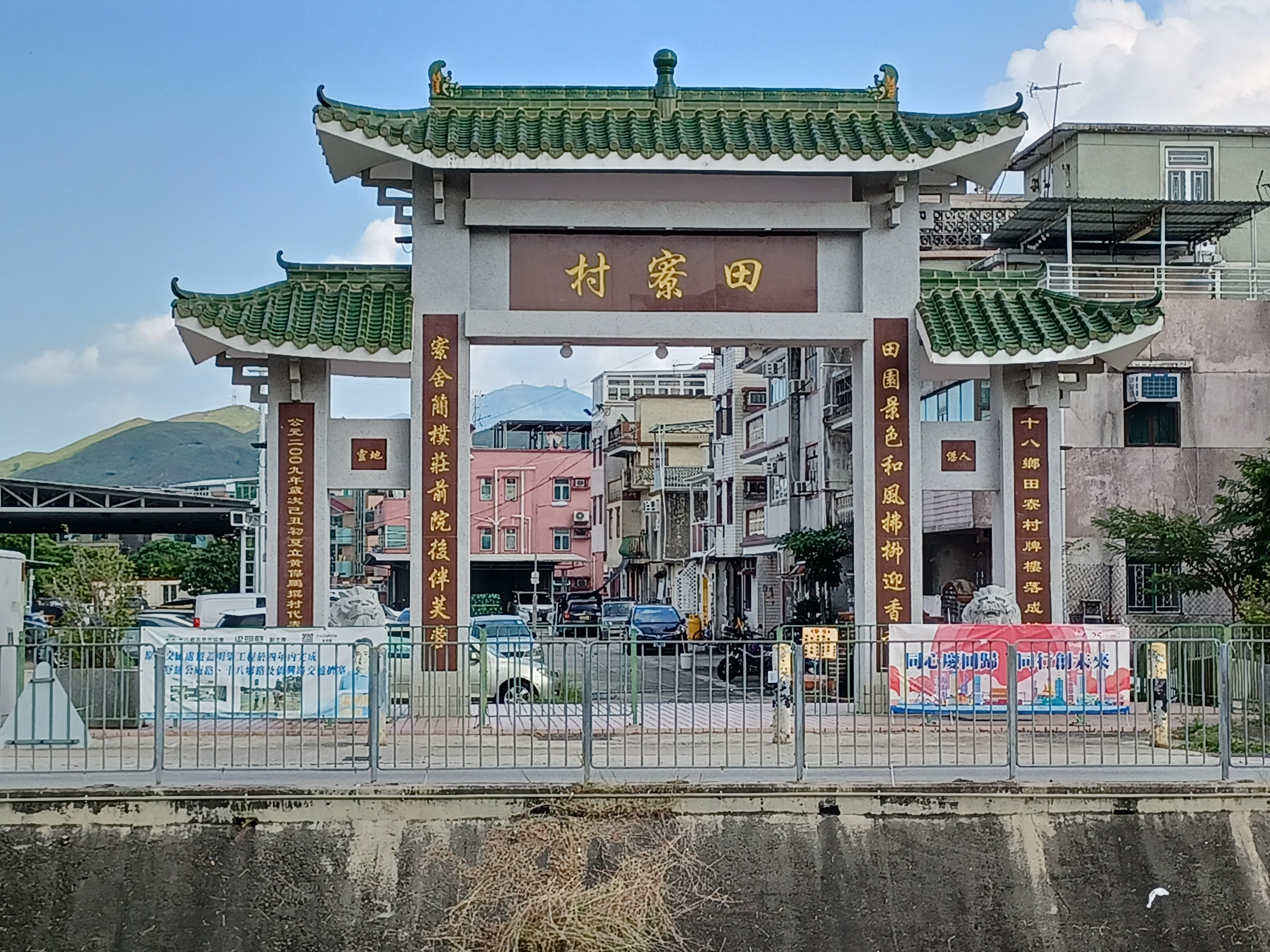
Paifang of Tin Liu Tsuen

Tin Liu Tsuen (Chinese: 田寮村) is a walled village in Shap Pat Heung, Yuen Long District, Hong Kong.

== Administration ==
Tin Liu Tsuen is a recognized village under the New Territories Small House Policy.

== History ==
The village was historically a Punti village, settled by four clans surnamed Wu (胡), Wong (黃), Yip (葉) and Sit (薛). In the early 19th century, the village was part of the Shap Pat Heung (literally 'Eighteen Villages Alliance').

At the time of the 1911 census, the population of Tin Liu was 105. The number of males was 48.

== Features ==
The main shrine of Tin Liu Tsuen is dedicated to Tai Wong, the protective deity of the village. Rebuilt in 1935, it lies on the central axis of the village together with the Entrance Gate. The entrance gate was rebuilt in 1930. Both the Entrance gate and the main shrine are listed as Grade III historic buildings.

== Education ==
Tin Liu Tsuen is divided between Primary One Admission (POA) School Net 73 and POA School Net 74. Within POA 73 are multiple aided schools (operated independently but funded with government money) and one government school: South Yuen Long Government Primary School (南元朗官立小學). POA 74 has multiple aided schools and one government school: Yuen Long Government Primary School (元朗官立小學).

== See also ==
- Walled villages of Hong Kong
- Sham Chung Tsuen, a village adjacent to Sham Chung Tsuen, to its east
