= Shung Ching San Tsuen =

Village in Hong Kong

Coordinates: 22.43169°N 114.03013°E

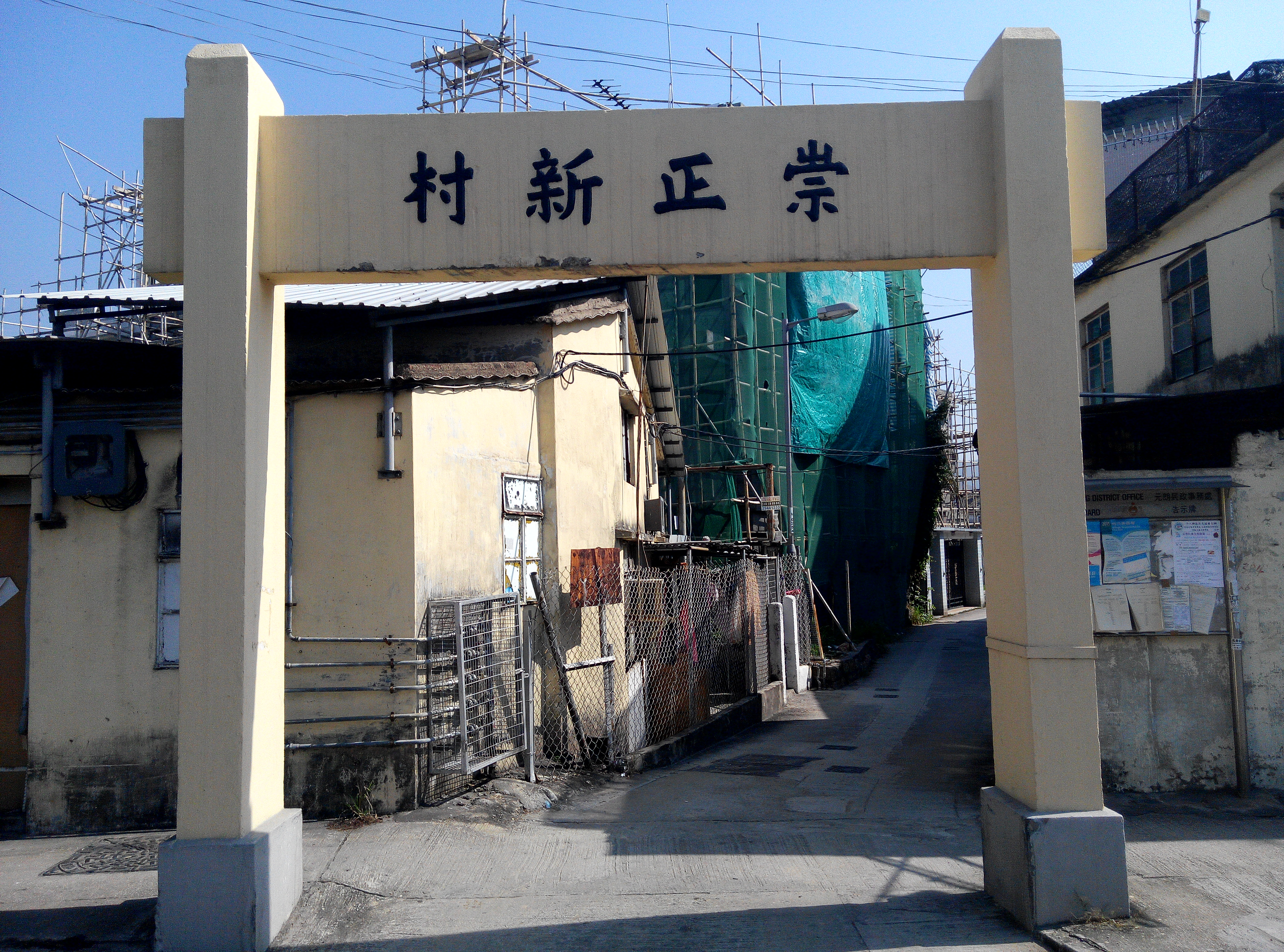
Archway of Shung Ching San Tsuen in 2014

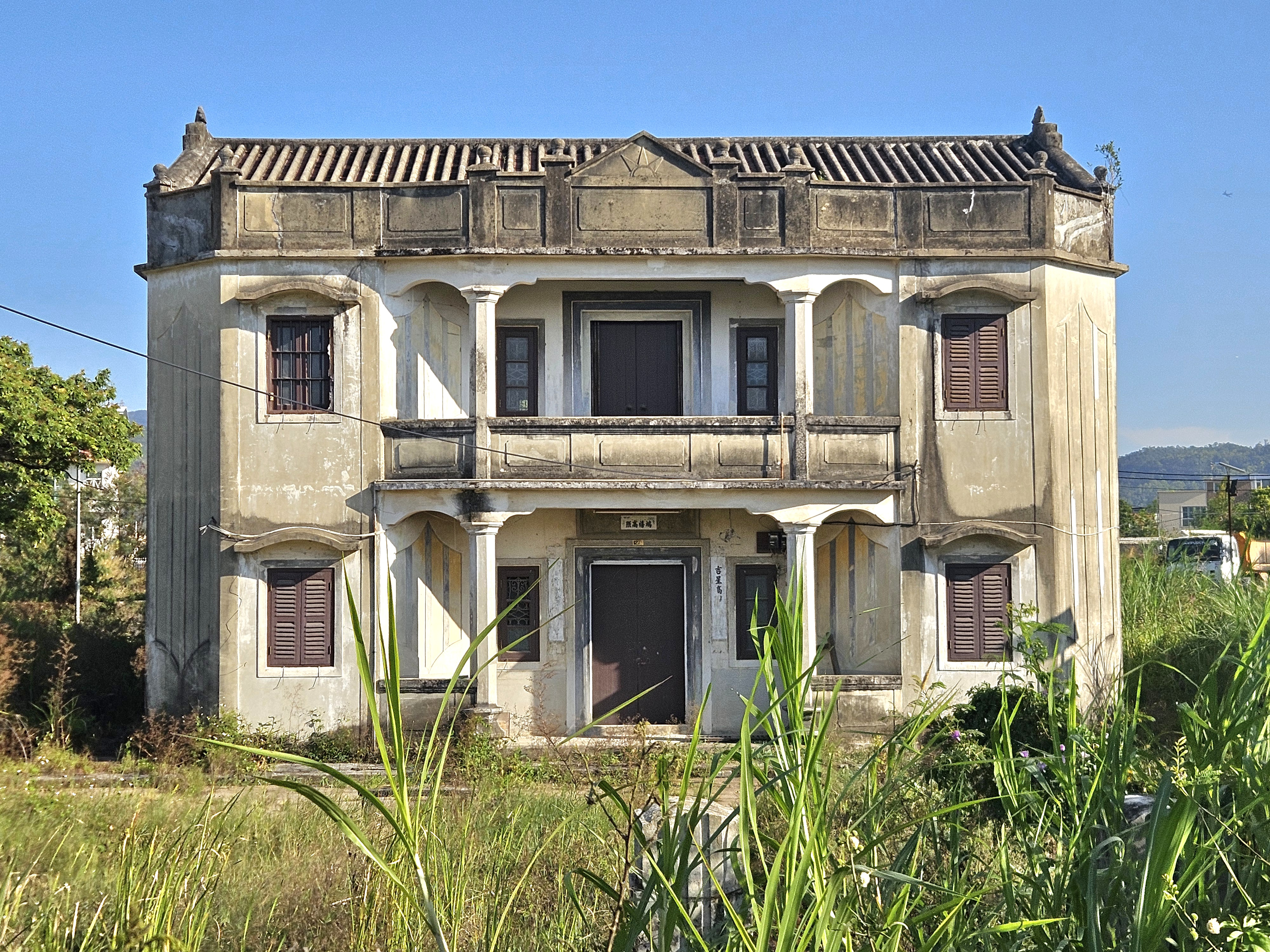
No. 176 Shung Ching San Tsuen

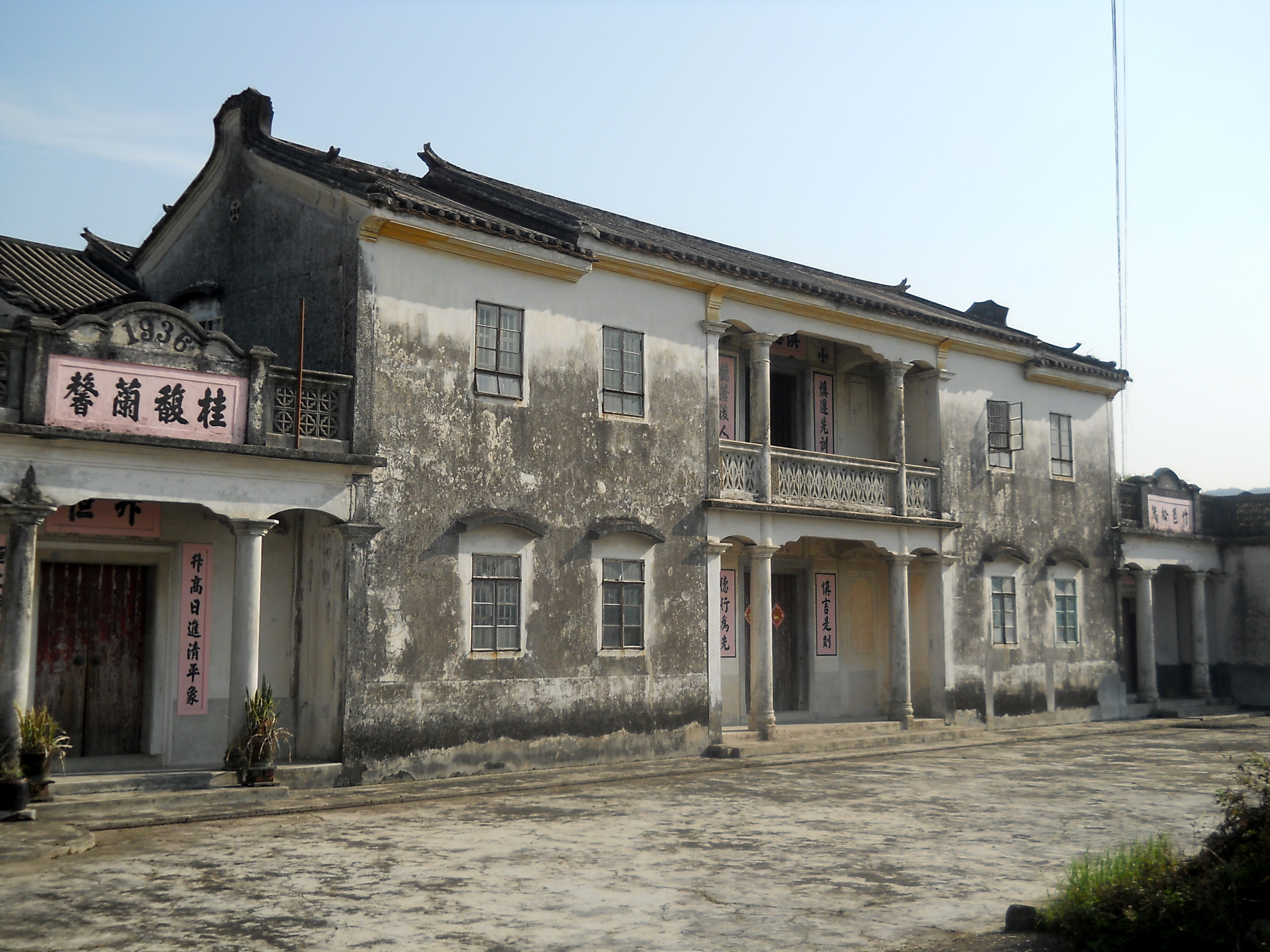
Shun Tak Kui in Shung Ching San Tsuen

Shung Ching San Tsuen (Chinese: 崇正新村) is a village in the Shap Pat Heung area of Yuen Long District, Hong Kong.

== Administration ==
Shung Ching San Tsuen is a recognized village under the New Territories Small House Policy.

== Education ==
Shung Ching San Tsuen is divided between Primary One Admission (POA) School Net 73 and POA School Net 74. Within POA 73 are multiple aided schools (operated independently but funded with government money) and one government school: South Yuen Long Government Primary School (南元朗官立小學). POA 74 has multiple aided schools and one government school: Yuen Long Government Primary School (元朗官立小學).
