= Shan Pui Chung Hau Tsuen =

Village in Hong Kong

Coordinates: 22.453747°N 114.030670°E

Shan Pui Chung Hau Tsuen (Chinese: 山貝涌口) is a village in the Shap Pat Heung area of Yuen Long District, Hong Kong. It was established along the Shan Pui River when there was still a lot of river transport.
