= Nga Yiu Tau, Yuen Long District =

Village in Hong Kong

Coordinates: 22.428479°N 114.03742°E

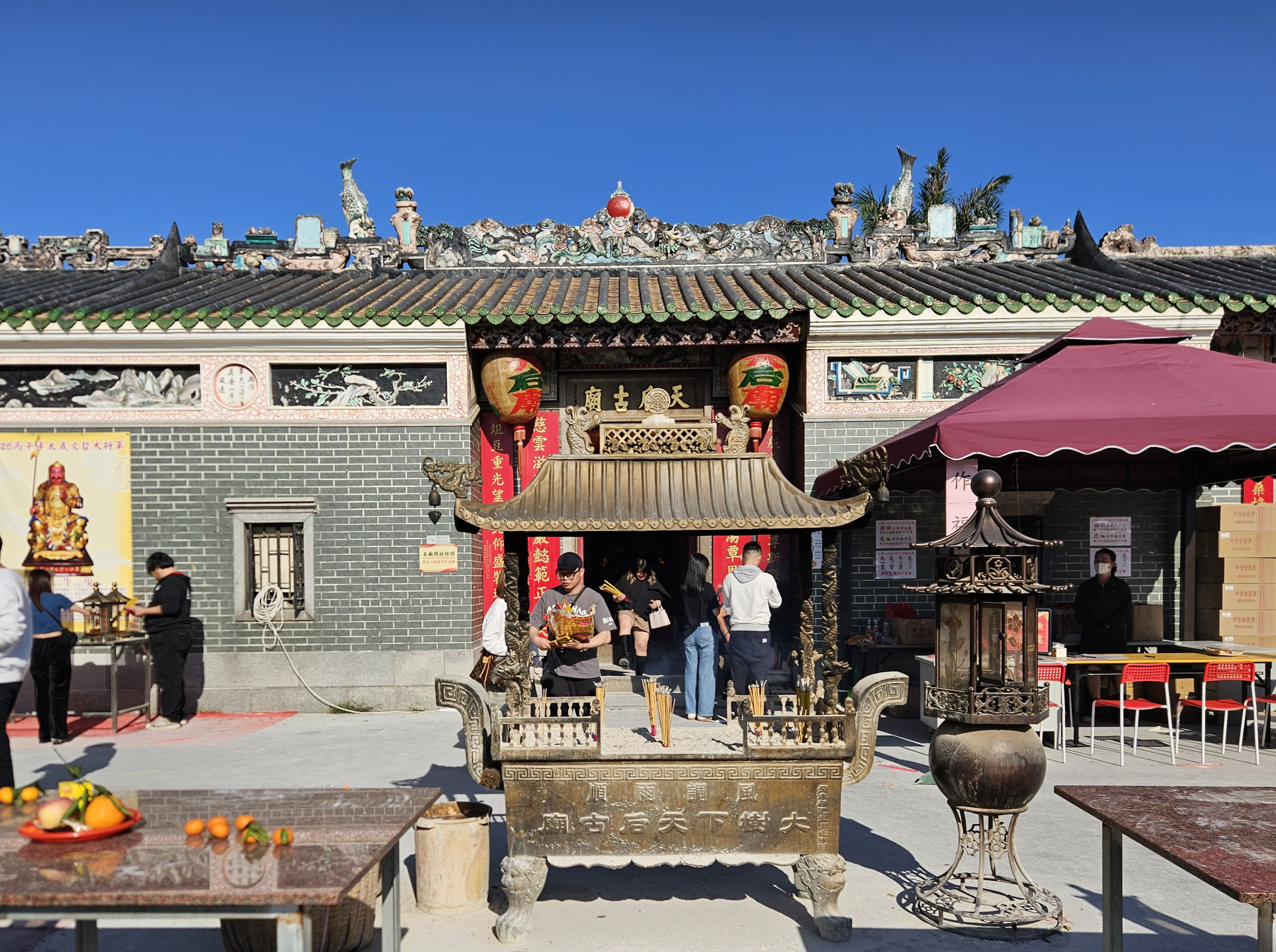
Tin Hau Temple in Nga Yiu Tau.

The location of Nga Yiu Tau in Hong Kong

Nga Yiu Tau (Chinese: 瓦窰頭) is a village in Shap Pat Heung, Yuen Long District, Hong Kong.

== Administration ==
Nga Yiu Tau is a recognized village under the New Territories Small House Policy.

== History ==
The village was originally called Lung Yin Tsuen (龍涎村). It was changed to the present name during World War II when newcomers settled there.
