= Tsui Wah Ferry =

Hong Kong ferry operator

Tsui Wah Ferry Service (H.K.) Ltd
- Company type: Private company
- Industry: Transportation
- Founded: 1986
- Headquarters: Hong Kong
- Parent: Traway Travel Ltd.
- Website: https://www.traway.com.hk/ferry/

Tsui Wah Ferry
- Traditional Chinese: 翠華船務(香港)有限公司
Transcriptions
Yue: Cantonese
- Yale Romanization: Cheui wàh syùhn mouh hēung góng yáuh haahn gūng sī
- Jyutping: Ceoi3 waa4 syun4 mou6 hoeng1 gong2 jau5 haan6 gung1 si1

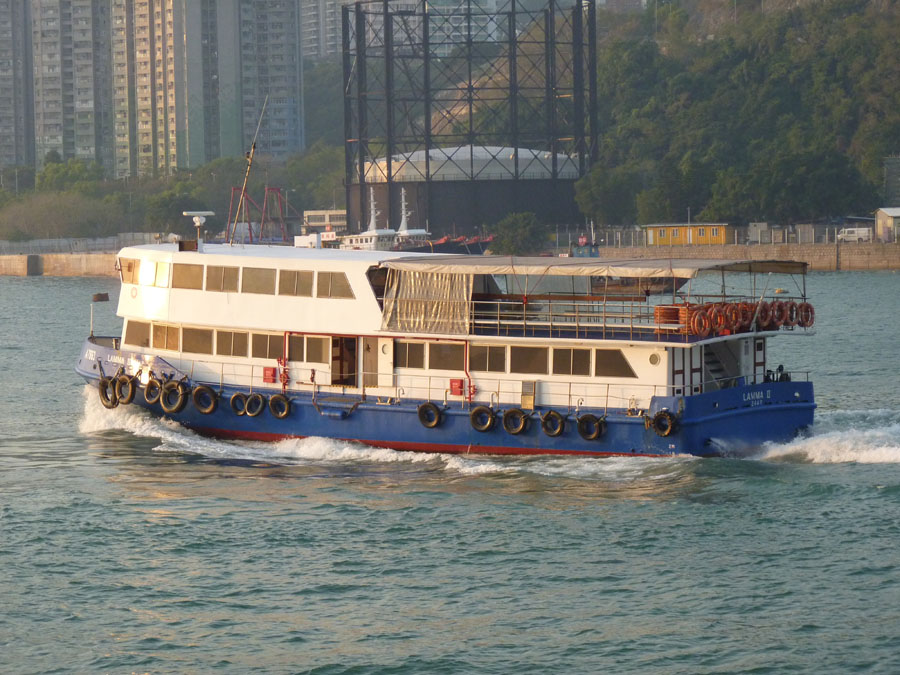
Tsui Wah Ferry's kai-to for Aberdeen to Yung Shue Wan.

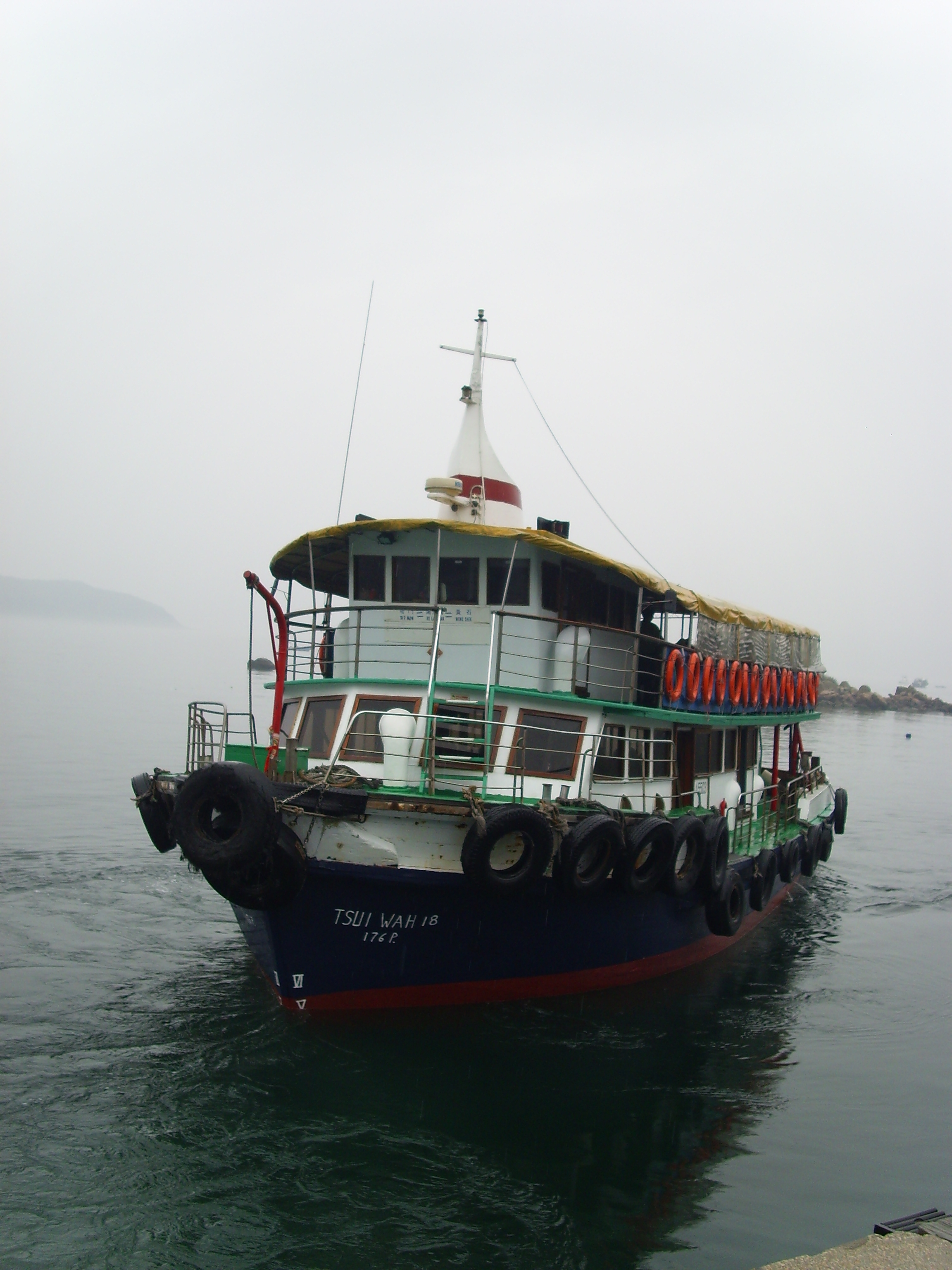
Tsui Wah Ferry's kai-to for Wong Shek Pier to Tap Mun.

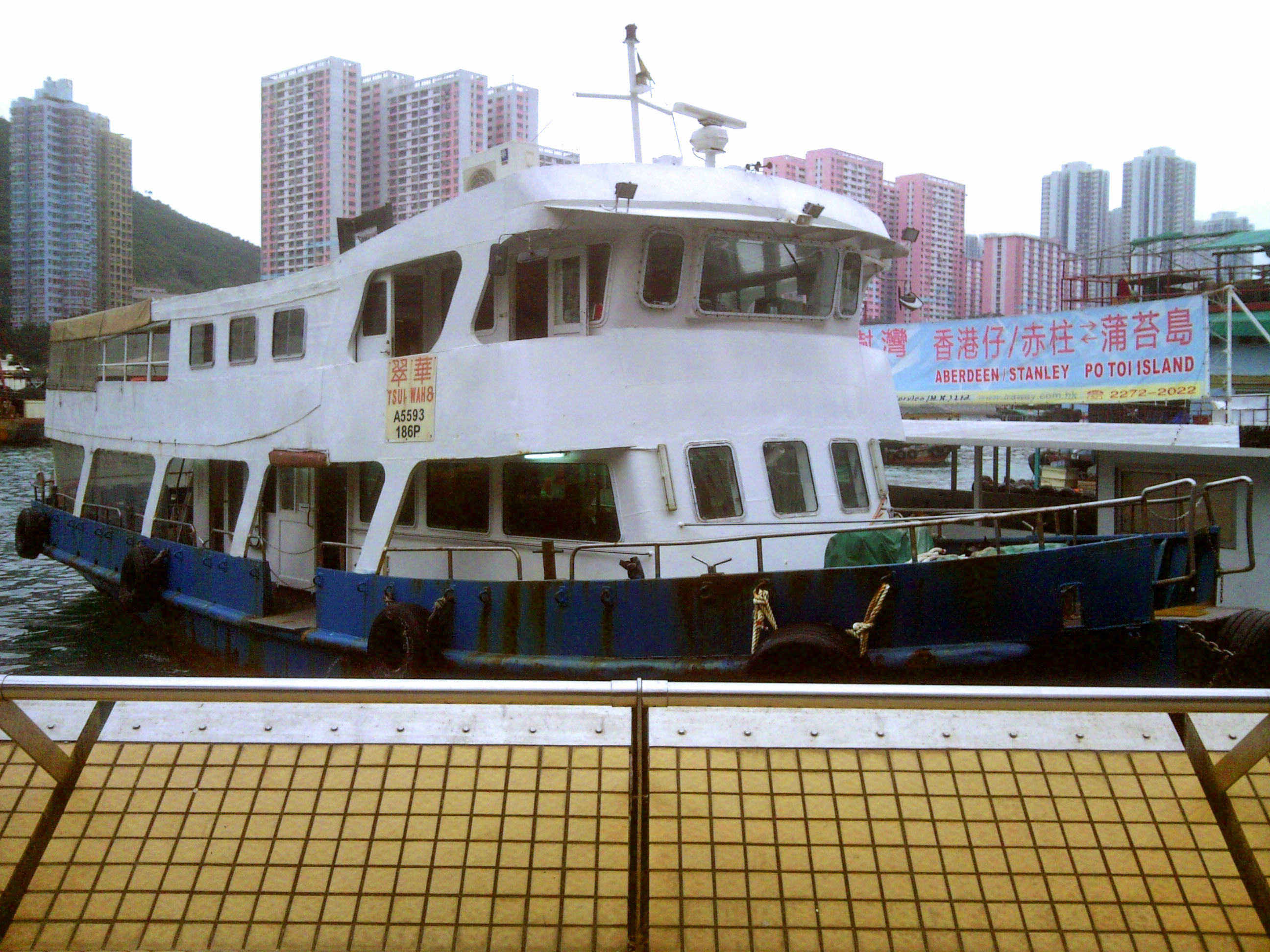
Tsui Wah Ferry's kai-to for Aberdeen to Po Toi Island.

Tsui Wah Ferry Service (H.K.) Ltd is a ferry service operator in Hong Kong.

== History ==
Tsui Wah Ferry was established in 1986. In the beginning its business only involved leasing ferries. Today the company provides passenger ferry services as well as boats for lease.

== Routes ==
- Aberdeen via Pak Kok Tsuen to Yung Shue Wan
- Aberdeen via Stanley Blake Pier to Po Toi Island
- Ma Liu Shui via Sham Chung and Lai Chi Chong to Tap Mun
- Ma Liu Shui to Tung Ping Chau
- Wong Shek Pier via Ko Lau Wan to Tap Mun
- Wong Shek Pier via Wan Tsai (Nam Fung Wan) to Chek Keng
- Aberdeen to Cheung Chau (run by Tsui Wah's subsidiary Maris Ferry (Chinese: 翠盈船務有限公司); discontinued since 1 January 2020)
