= Sai Kung East Country Park =

Country park on Sai Kung Peninsula, Hong Kong

Coordinates: 22.4013°N 114.3453°E

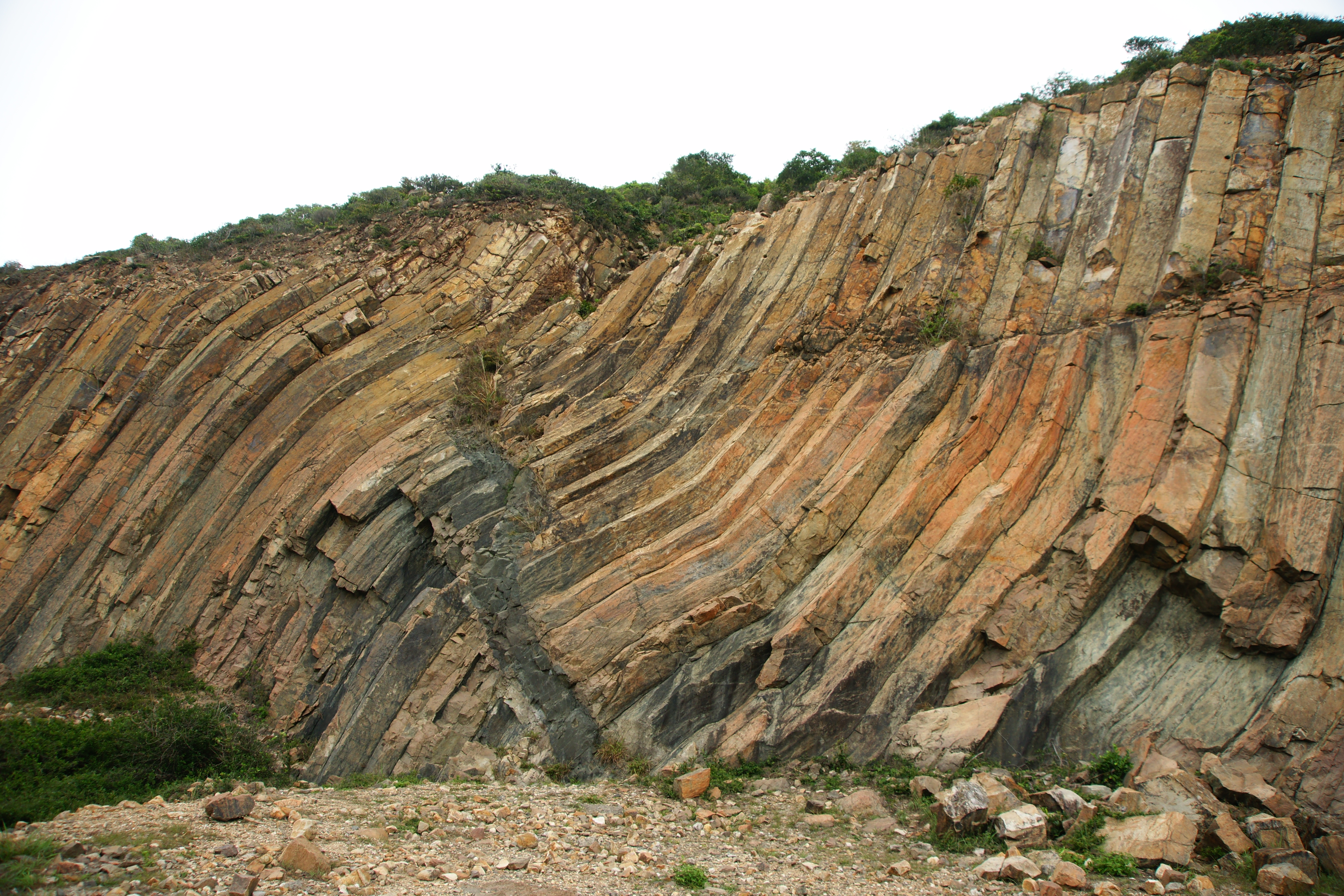
- Distorted hexagonal columnar tuff, near High Island Reservoir East Dam
- Type: Country park
- Location: Sai Kung Peninsula, New Territories, Hong Kong
- Area: 4,494 hectares (11,100 acres)
- Designated: 1978
- Manager: Agriculture, Fisheries and Conservation Department

Sai Kung East Country Park (Chinese: 西貢東郊野公園) is a country park on the Sai Kung Peninsula in Hong Kong, measuring 44.77 square kilometres (17.29 sq mi). It opened in 1978 and has features including:

- High Island Reservoir
- High Island
- Pak Tam Au
- Sheung Yiu
- Wong Shek Pier
- Beaches of Tai Long Wan: Sai Wan, Ham Tin Wan, Tai Wan and Tung Wan.
- Sharp Peak
- Po Pin Chau
- Conic Island (飯甑洲, Fan Tsang Chau)
- Long Ke Wan
- Luk Wu
- Long Harbour
- Chek Keng

== Villages ==
- Ko Lau Wan
- Tan Ka Wan

== See also ==
- Hong Kong National Geopark
- Sai Kung West Country Park
