= Long Harbour (Hong Kong) =

Natural harbour north of Sai Kung Peninsula, Hong Kong

Coordinates: 22°27′08″N 114°20′51″E

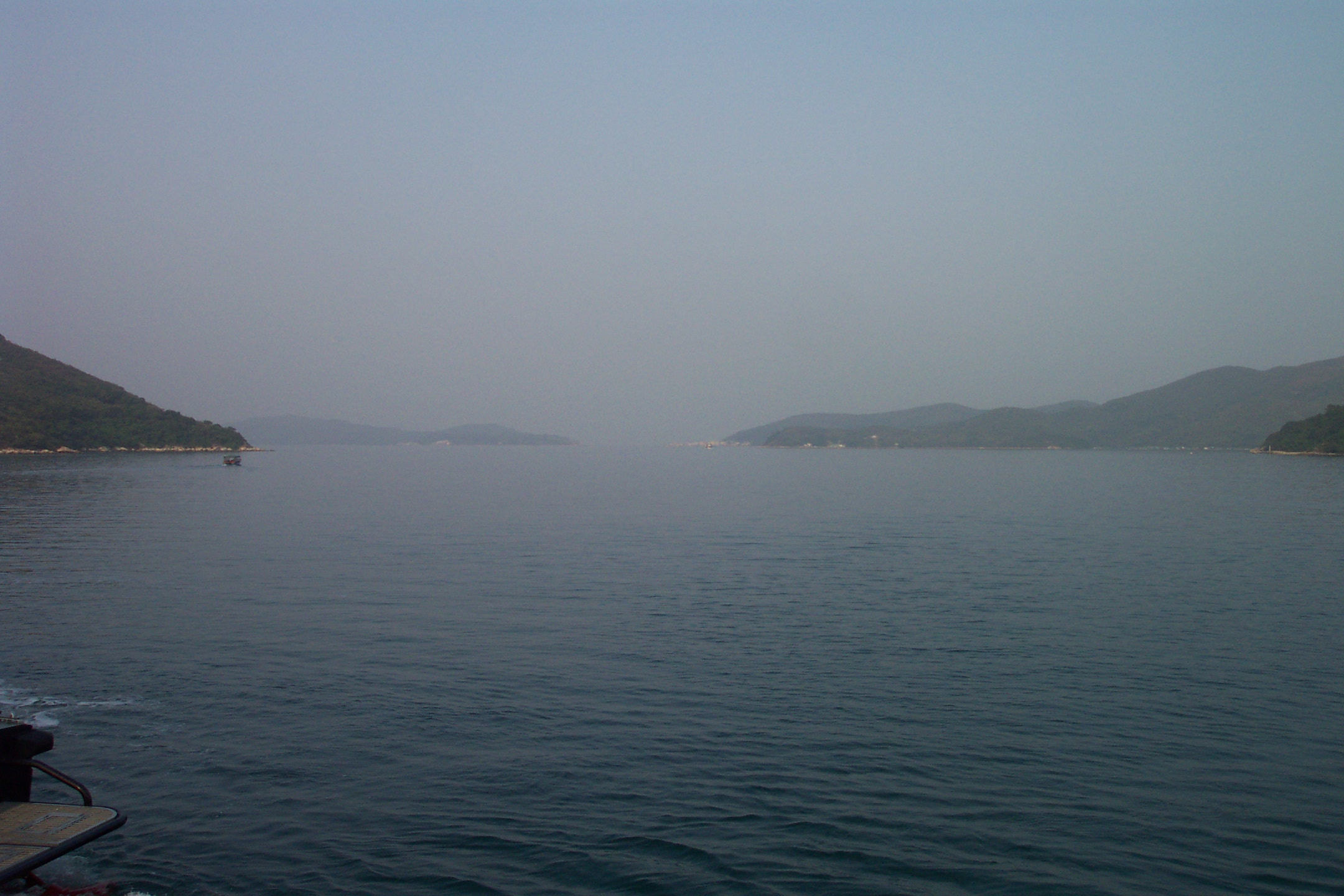
View down Long Harbour from Wong Shek Pier.

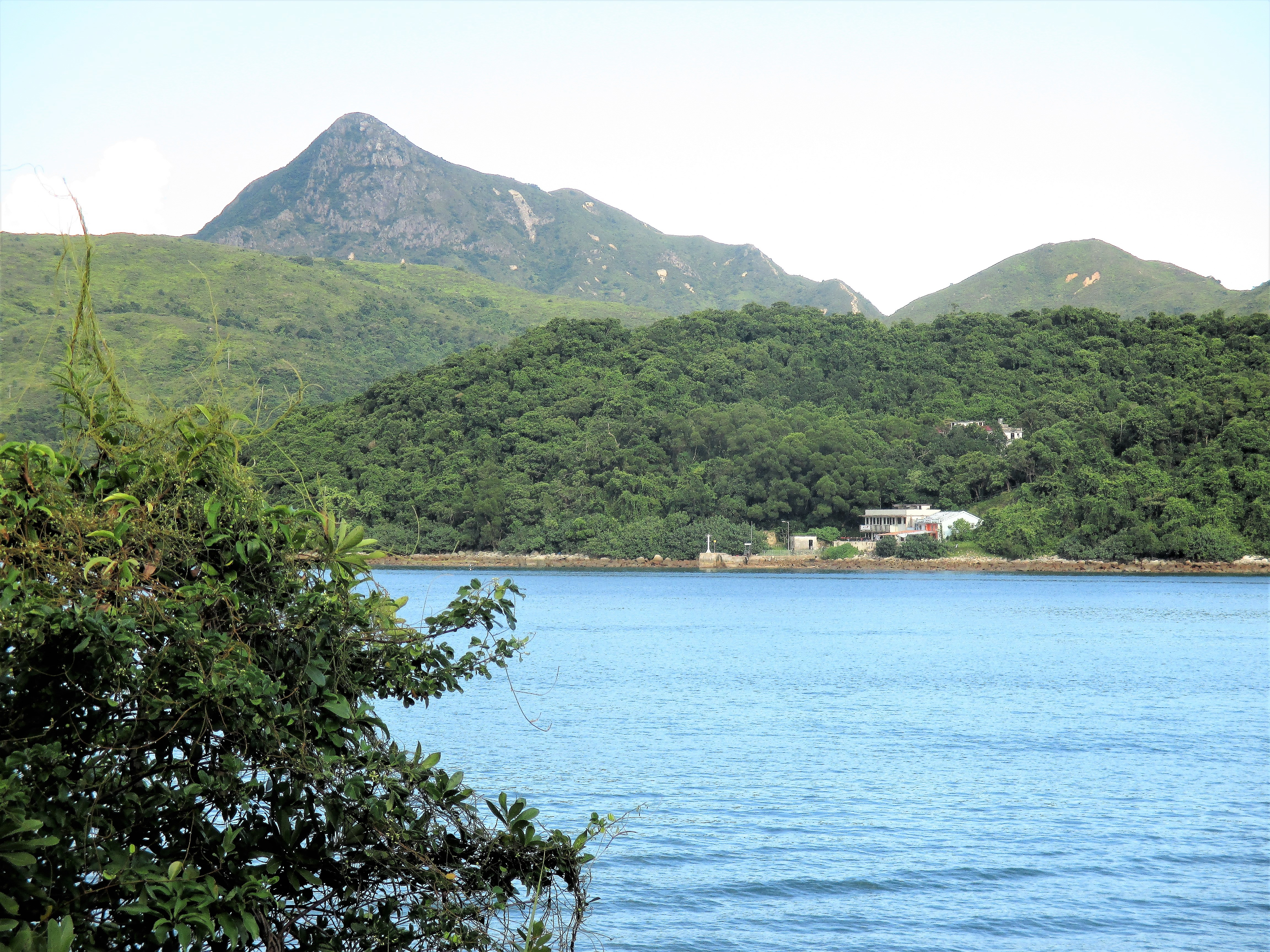
View of Tung Sam Kei from Tai Tan Country Trail, across Ko Tong Hau. Sharp Peak is visible in the background.

Long Harbour, also known as Tai Tan Hoi (Chinese: 大灘海), is a natural harbour formed from an inlet of Mirs Bay to the north of Sai Kung Peninsula, Hong Kong.

== Geography ==
The harbour is elongated in shape, with its mouth guarded by the island of Tap Mun (塔門). The inner stretch of the harbour is split into two arms by Tung Sam Kei Shan (Long Hill) at Tung Sam Kei Tsui. The East Arm, Chek Keng Hau (赤徑口), points to Chek Keng and the West Arm, Ko Tong Hau (高塘口), points to Wong Ma Tei and Ngau Wu Tun.

== Villages ==
Several remote settlements, without road access, exist on the shores of Long Harbour and the nearby islands, including Tap Mun, Wan Tsai (灣仔) and Chek Keng (赤徑).

Other villages include:

- Ko Lau Wan
- Tai Tan
- Tan Ka Wan
- Tung Sam Kei

== Transportation ==
Kai-to ferry routes operate to these from Wong Shek Pier, a road connected pier at the head of the West Arm, and Ma Liu Shui, on the MTR East Rail line near the new town of Sha Tin.

== See also ==
- List of harbours in Hong Kong
