= Tai Tan =

Village in Hong Kong

Coordinates: 22.440315°N 114.333007°E

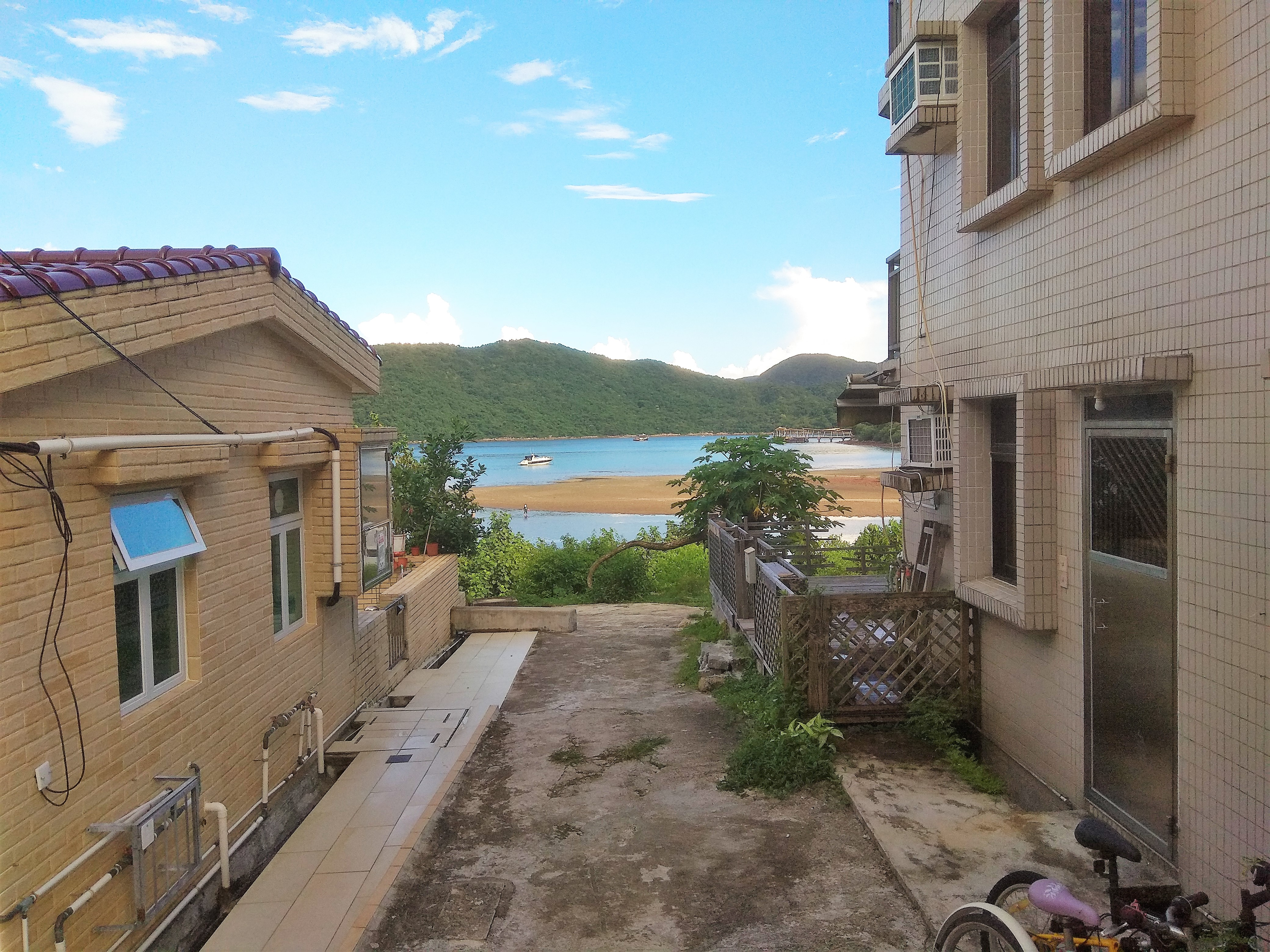
View of Ko Tong Hau (高塘口) bay from Tai Tan. Wong Shek Pier is visible in the distance.

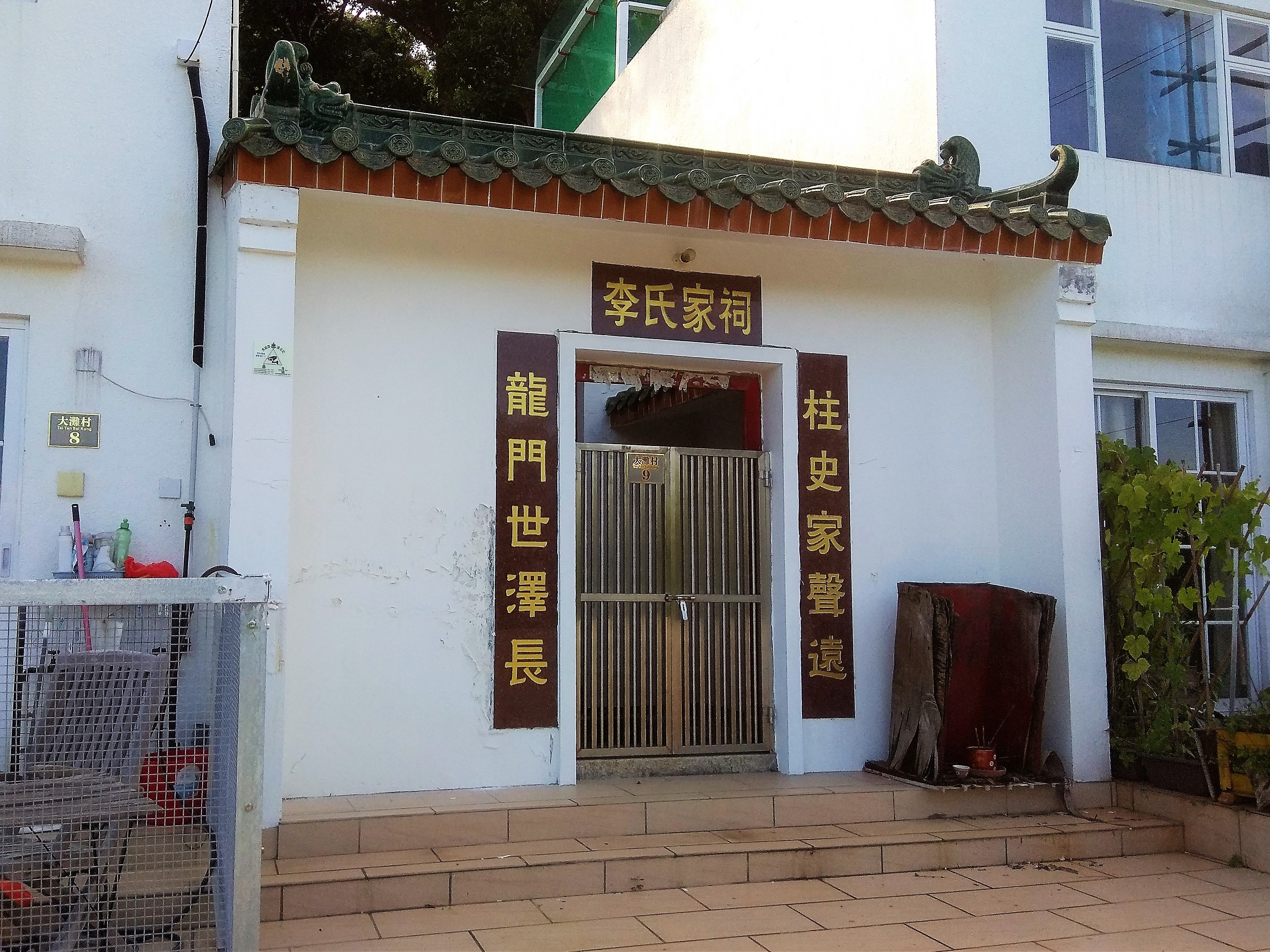
Li (李) Ancestral Hall in Tai Tan.

Boat arriving at Wong Shek Pier. Tai Tan is visible in the background.

Tai Tan (Chinese: 大灘) is a village of in the Sai Kung North area of Tai Po District, Hong Kong.

== Administration ==
Tai Tan is a recognized village under the New Territories Small House Policy.

== History ==
At the time of the 1911 census, the population of Tai Tan was 35. The number of males was 12.

== See also ==
- Long Harbour (Hong Kong)
