= Kai-to =

Type of motorised ferry in Hong Kong

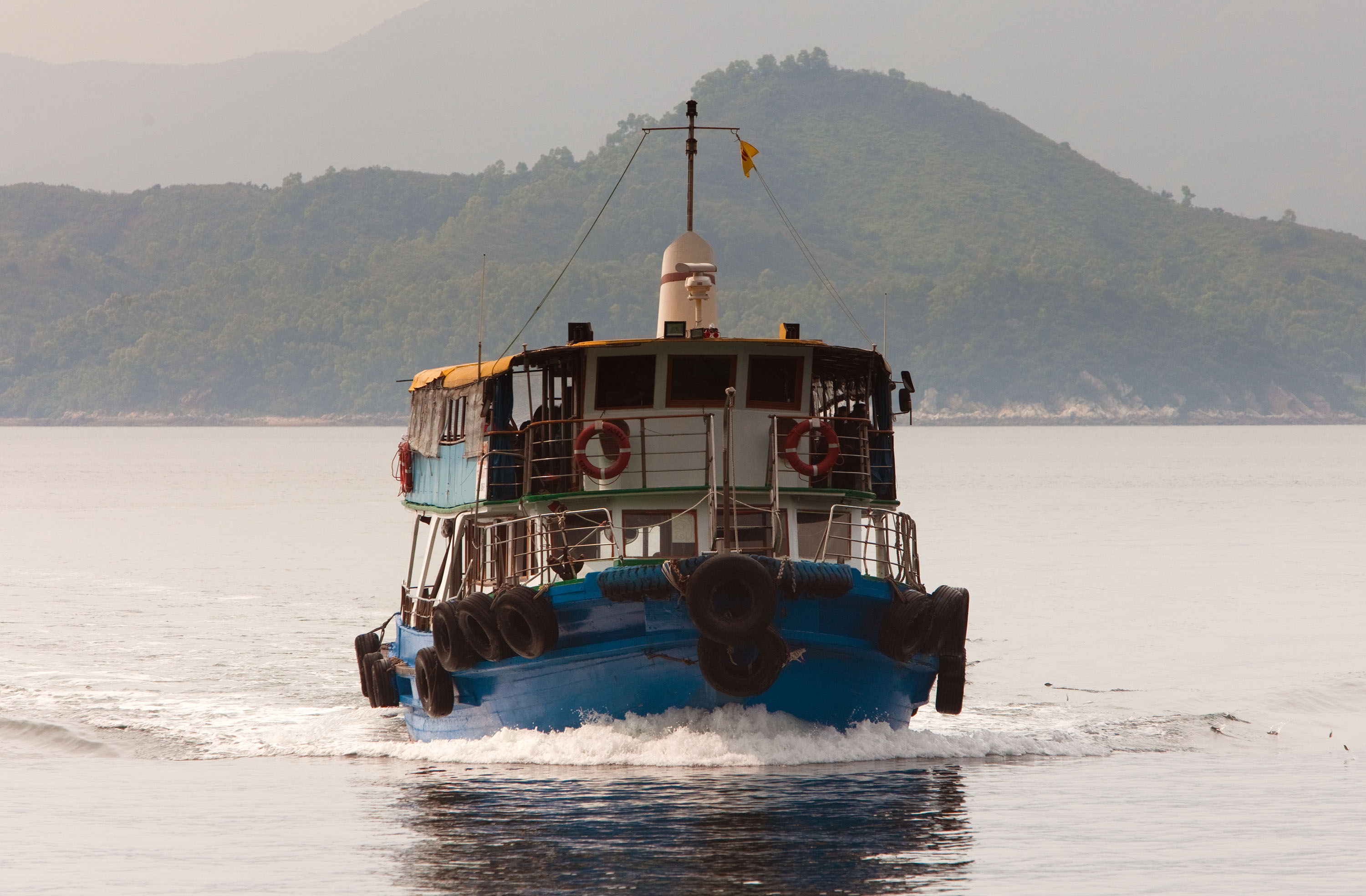
A kai-to sailing between Ma Liu Shui and Tap Mun, Hong Kong

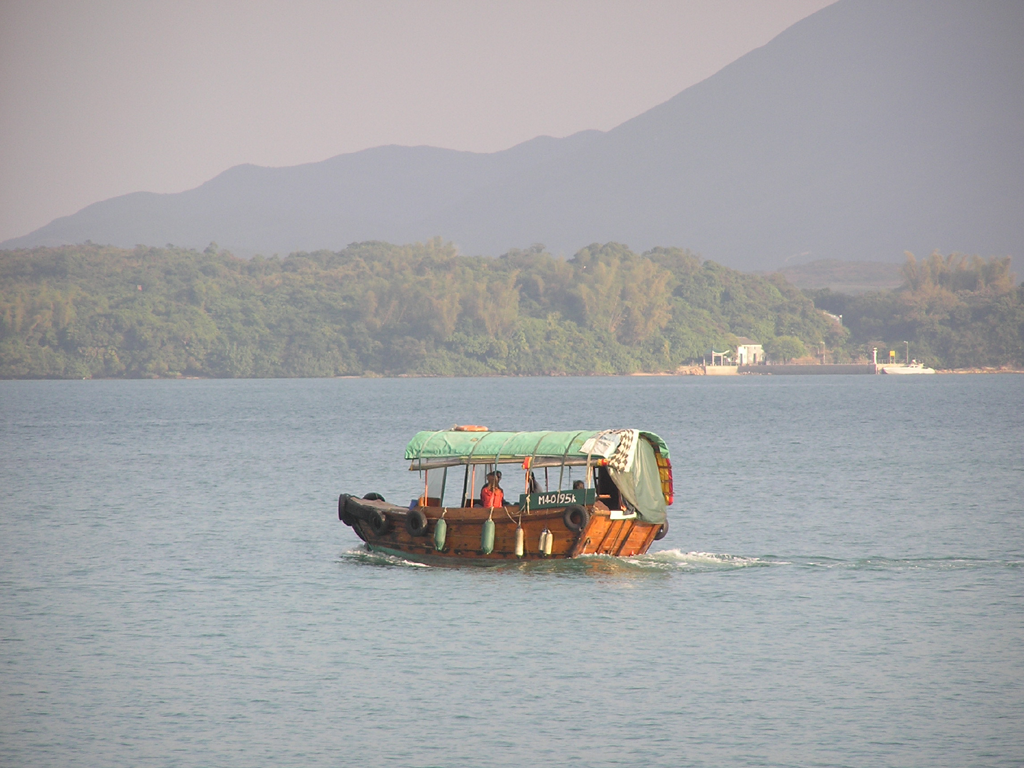
A smaller kai-to carrying passengers to the outlying islands off the Sai Kung Peninsula in Hong Kong

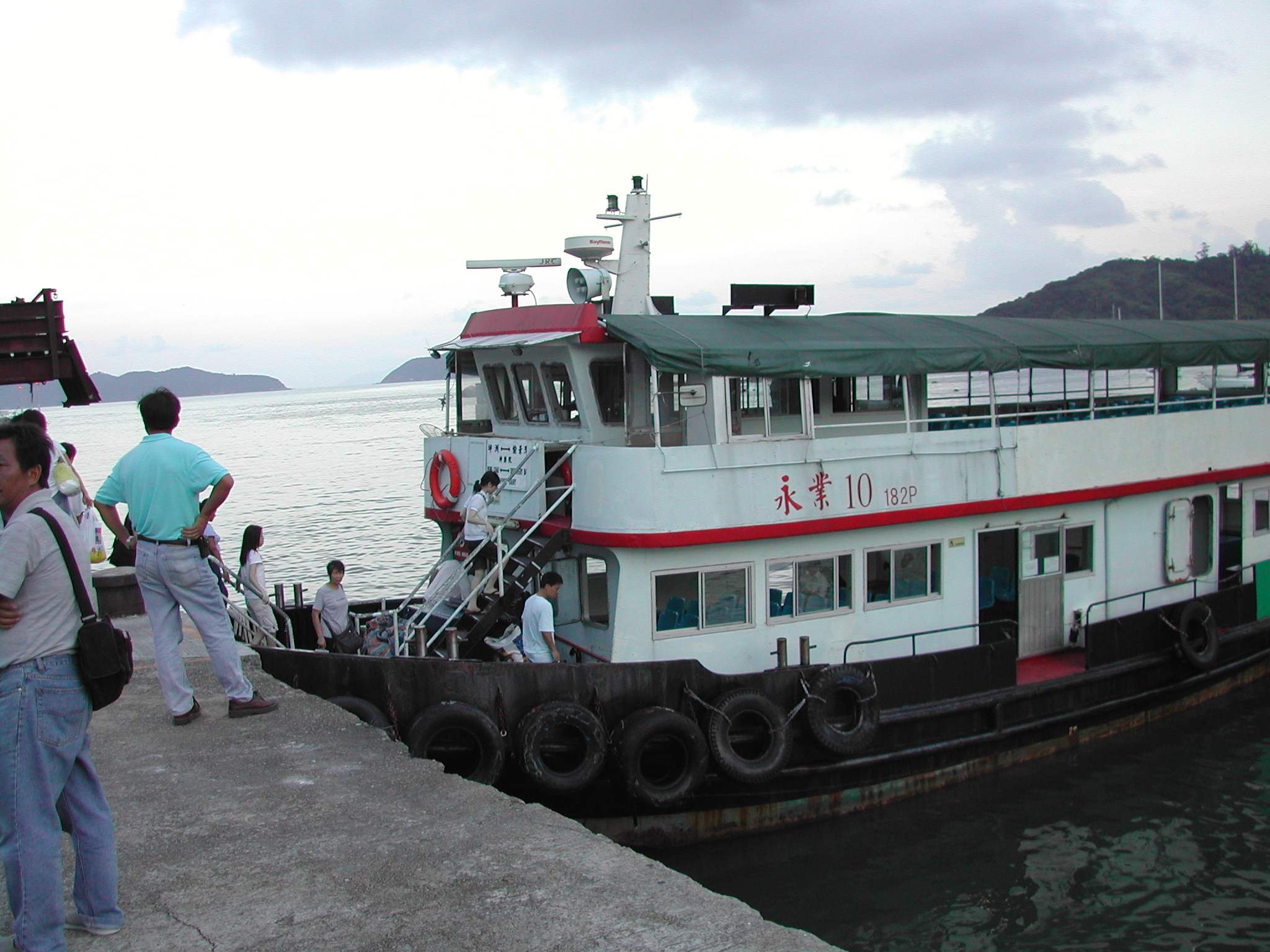
Passengers boarding a larger kai-to heading to Peng Chau at the Discovery Bay kai-to pier in Nim Shue Wan

The kai-to, sometimes kaito or kaido (Chinese: 街渡; Jyutping: gaai1 dou2; pinyin: jiēdù), is a type of small, motorised ferry that operates in Hong Kong. They are usually used to serve remote coastal settlements in the territory's outlying islands.

There are currently 78 fixed kai-to routes, mostly used to ferry passengers between the outlying islands of Lantau Island, Peng Chau, Cheung Chau, and Lamma Island, among others, to the west of Hong Kong, and to enclave villages in the Tolo Harbour, Double Haven, Port Shelter, etc. in eastern New Territories.

Certain routes within Victoria Harbour are still served by kai-tos, including the Sai Wan Ho to Kwun Tong route.

== Operators ==
- Coral Sea Ferry (珊瑚海船務) – 3 routes
- Peng Chau Kaito Ltd (坪洲街渡)
- Lum Kay Kaito (林記街渡) – 1 route
- Chuen Kee Ferry (全記渡)
- Tsui Wah Ferry (翠華船務)
- Fortune Ferry (富裕小輪)

== Regular kai-to ferry services ==
- Aberdeen – Ap Lei Chau
- Aberdeen/Stanley – Po Toi Island
- Cheung Chau Public Pier – Sai Wan
- Discovery Bay – Peng Chau/Trappist Monastery
- Ma Liu Shui – Lai Chi Wo
- Ma Liu Shui – Kat O/Ap Chau
- Ma Liu Shui – Tap Mun
- Ma Liu Shui – Tung Ping Chau
- Sai Wan Ho – Tung Lung Island
- Sam Ka Tsuen – Tung Lung Island
- Sai Kung – Fo Tau Fan Chau
- Sha Tau Kok – Ap Chau/Kat O
- Tap Mun – Wong Shek Pier (via Ko Lau Wan and Chek Keng)
- Wong Shek Pier – Wan Tsai (Nam Fung Wan)/Chek Keng
- Tai Shui Hang – Ma Liu Shui/Tai Mei Tuk
- Sam Mun Tsai – Tai Shui Hang/Lai Chi Wo/Kat O/Ap Chau
