= Ngong Wo =

Village in Sai Kung, Hong Kong

Coordinates: 22.402402°N 114.285182°E

Ngong Wo (Chinese: 昂窩) is a village in Sai Kung District, Hong Kong.

== Administration ==
Wong Chuk Wan, including Ngong Wo, is a recognized village under the New Territories Small House Policy.
