= Tung Sam Kei =

Village in Hong Kong

Coordinates: 22.437873°N 114.344611°E

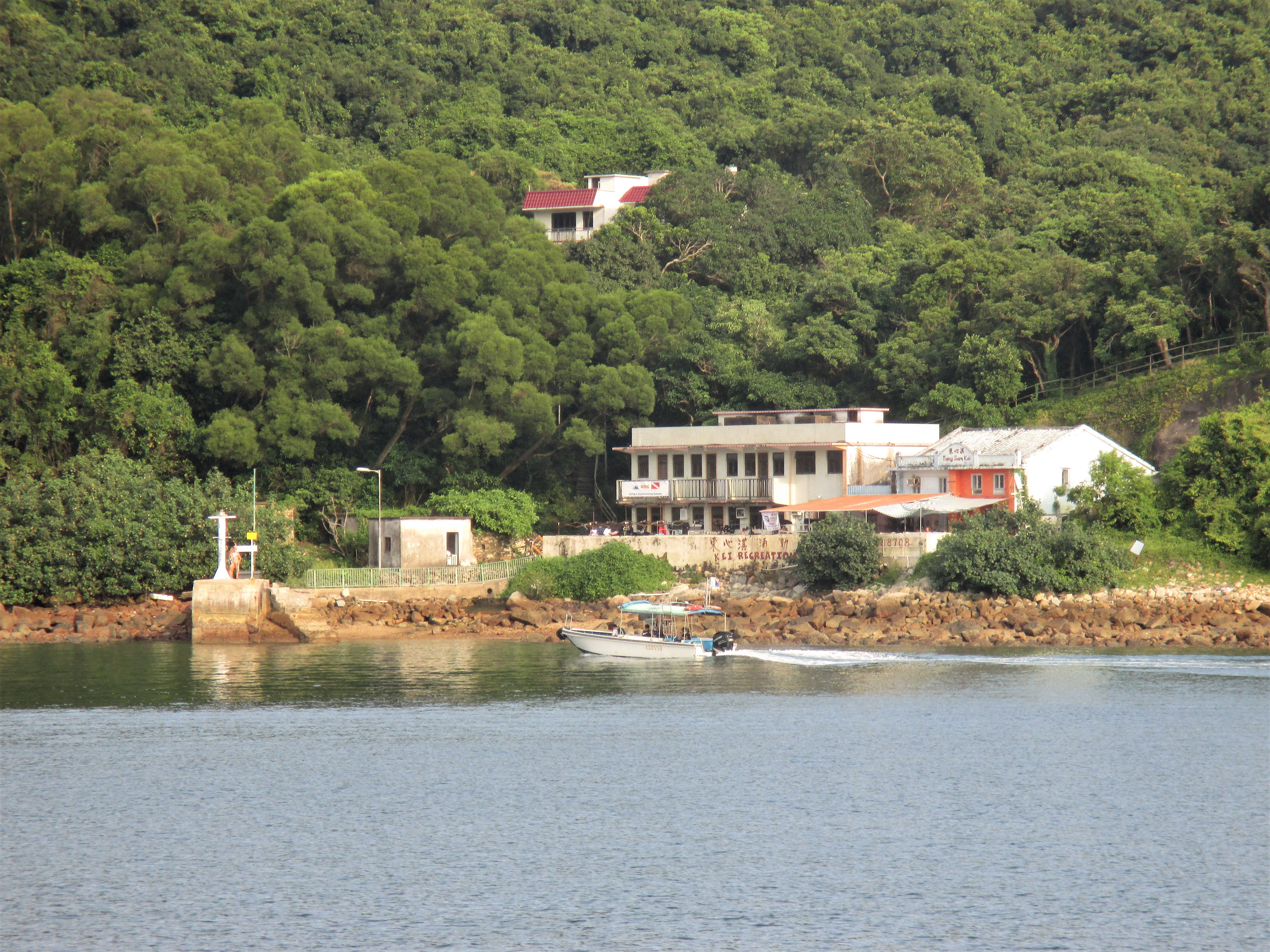
Tung Sam Kei viewed from Long Harbour. The building on the right is Village House, No. 3 Tung Sam Kei.

Tung Sam Kei (Chinese: 東心淇) is a village of in the Sai Kung North area of Tai Po District, Hong Kong.

== Administration ==
Tung Sam Kei is a recognized village under the New Territories Small House Policy.
