= Ko Lau Wan =

Village in Hong Kong

Coordinates: 22.459544°N 114.361737°E

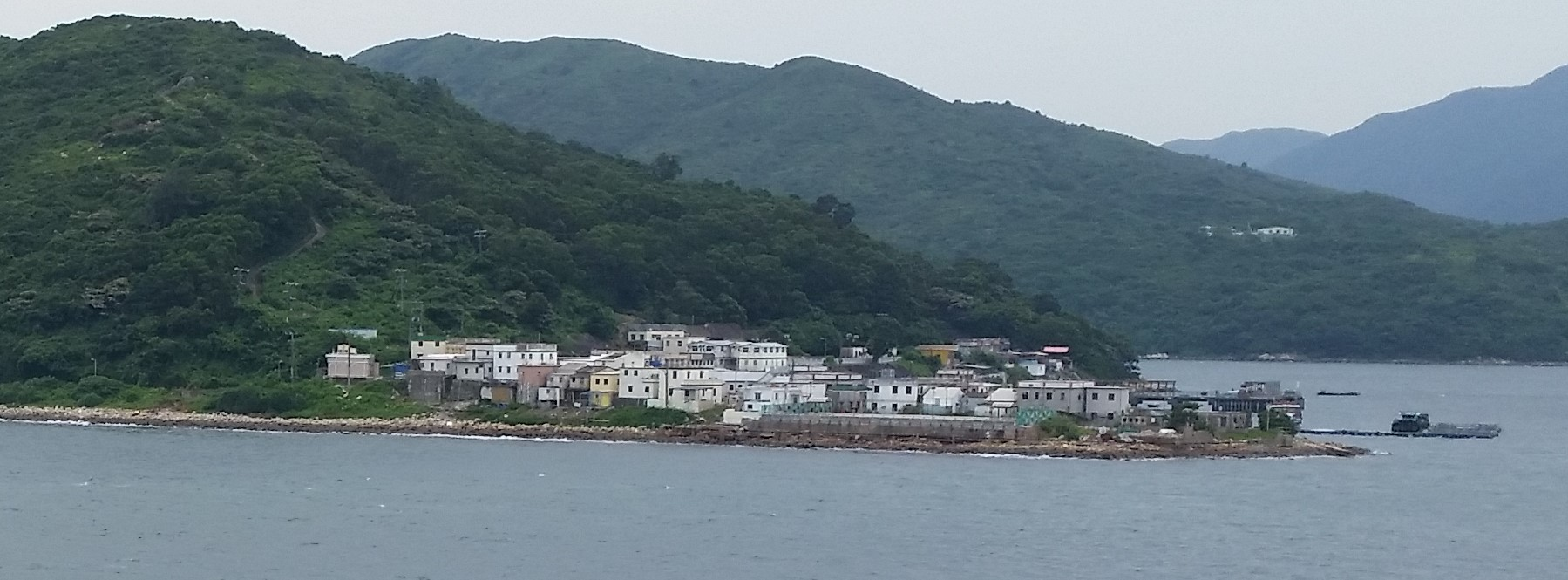
Ko Lau Wan as seen looking south from nearby Tap Mun in October 2016.

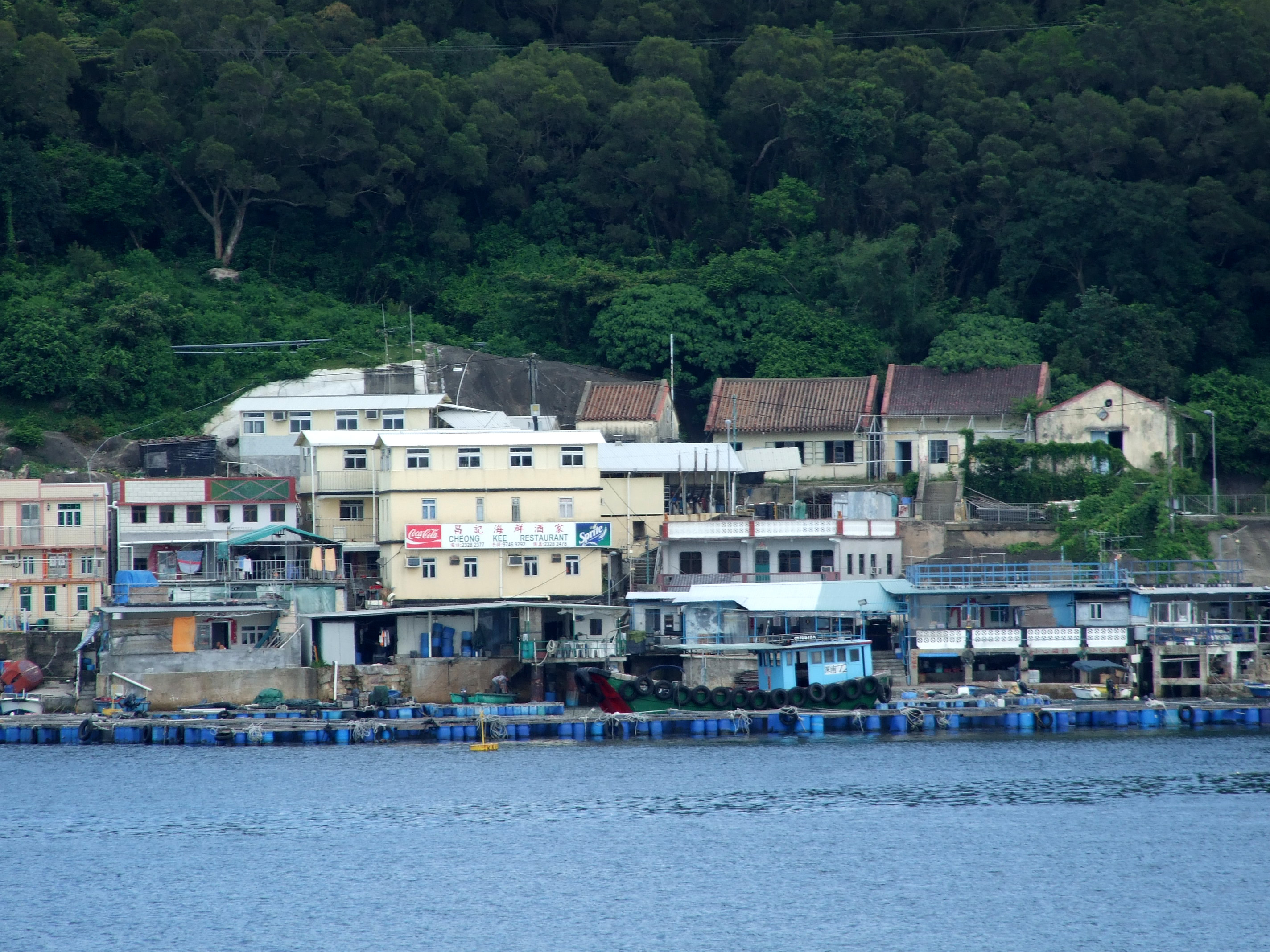
Ko Lau Wan in July 2011.

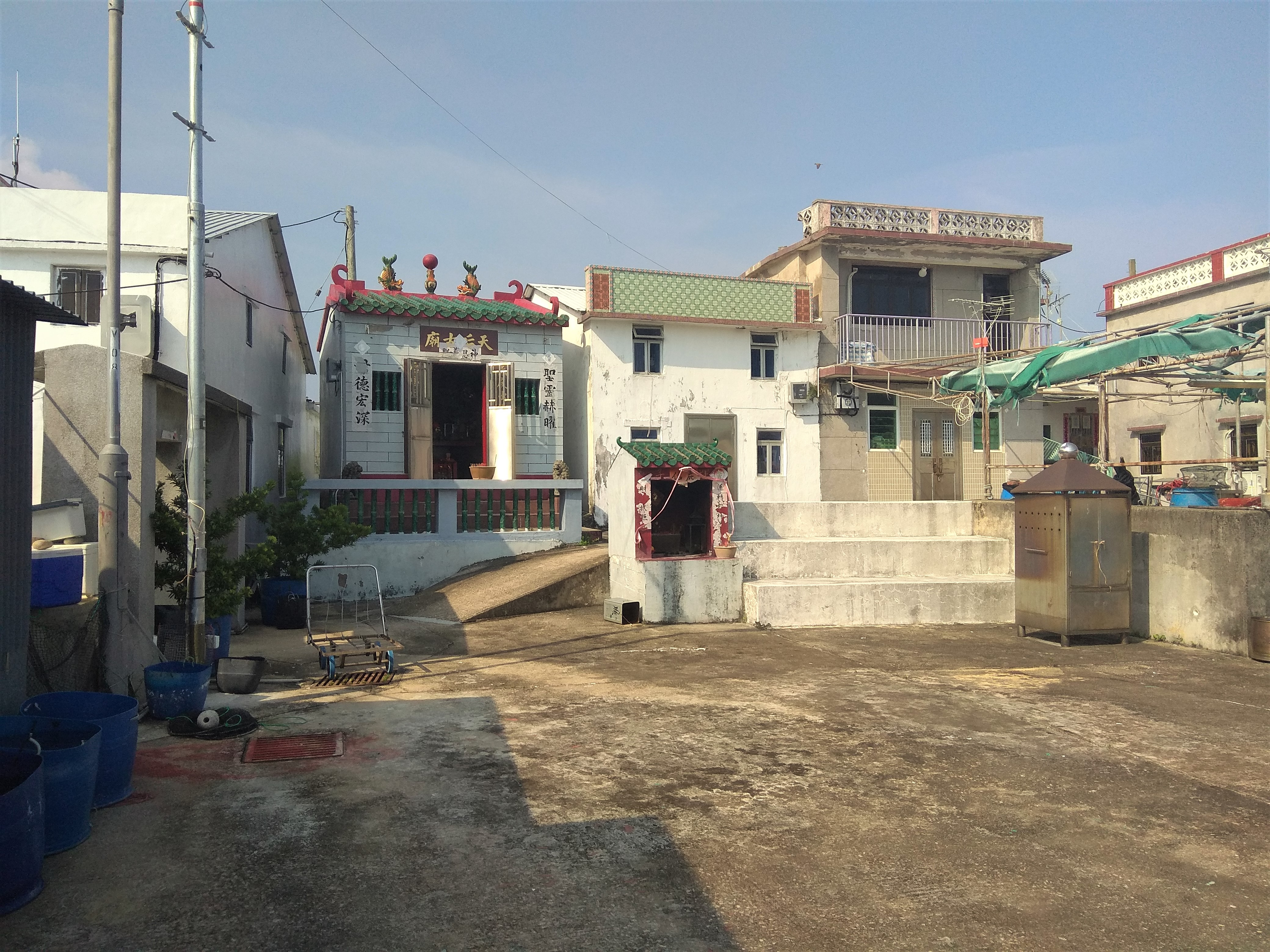
Tin Hau Temple on Ko Lau Wan in 2020.

Ko Lau Wan (Chinese: 高流灣) a.k.a. Kau Lau Wan (較流灣) is a remote village in the north of Sai Kung Peninsula, Hong Kong. Administratively, it is under the jurisdiction of Tai Po District.

== Administration ==
Kau Lau Wan is a recognised village under the New Territories Small House Policy.

== Geography ==
Together with nearby Tan Ka Wan, Ko Lau Wan forms an enclave within Sai Kung East Country Park.

== Features ==
A Tin Hau Temple is located in the village.

== In fiction ==
The 2005 French film The Moustache was partially filmed in Ko Lau Wan.

== Transport ==
There is no road for vehicles to head to Ko Lau Wan. The area can be accessed by kai-to ferries from Ma Liu Shui or Wong Shek Pier. There is also a hiking path from Pak Tam Au which normally takes about 5 hours for hikers to pass through.
