= Tan Ka Wan =

Village in Hong Kong

Coordinates: 22.451428°N 114.361364°E

Tan Ka Wan (Chinese: 蛋家灣) is a village in the Sai Kung North area of Tai Po District, Hong Kong.

== Administration ==
Tan Ka Wan is a recognized village under the New Territories Small House Policy.

== Geography ==
Tan Ka Wan comprises several smaller villages: Tse Uk (謝屋), Lau Uk (劉屋), Lam Uk (林屋) and Mo Uk (巫屋). The village cluster is mainly concentrated near the coast of Long Harbour.

Together with nearby Ko Lau Wan, Tan Ka Wan forms an enclave within Sai Kung East Country Park.

A natural stream in Tan Ka Wan flows from south to north towards Long Harbour. Estuarine mangrove can be found at the coastal area.

== Features ==
In 2014, the village was described as "sparsely populated with abandoned houses in dilapidated condition".

St. Peter's Chapel (聖伯多祿小堂) in Tan Ka Wan was built in 1873. It is one of the historic churches of Sai Kung Peninsula.

A drug rehabilitation centre, the Ling Oi Tan Ka Wan Centre, managed by the Evangelical Lutheran Church of Hong Kong is situated in Tan Ka Wan. The rehabilitation centre in Tan Ka Wan started in 1984.
