= Wong Chuk Wan =

Village in Hong Kong

Coordinates: 22.398889°N 114.284146°E

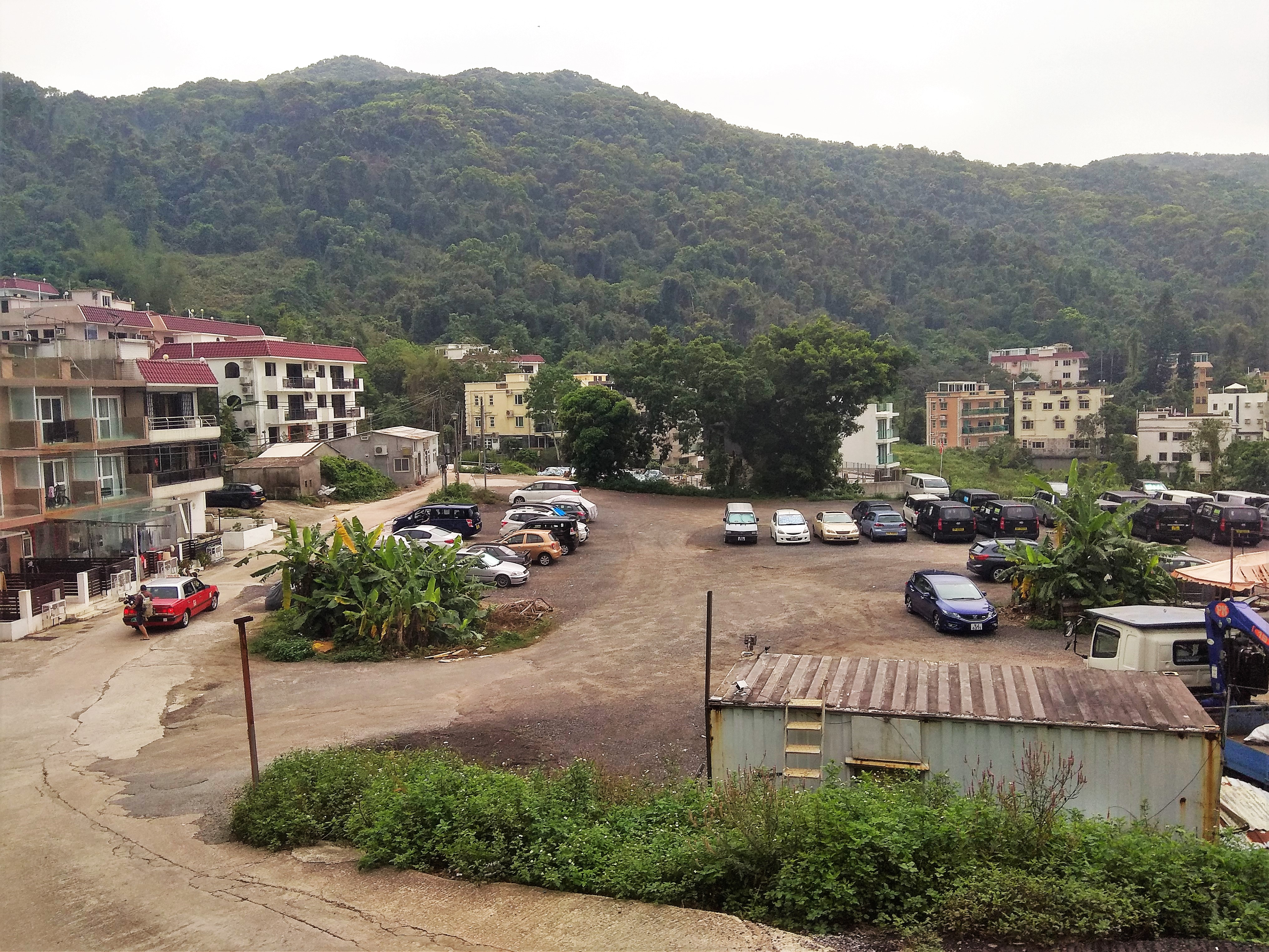
Wong Chuk Wan viewed from a bus on Sai Sha Road.

Wong Chuk Wan (Chinese: 黃竹灣) is a village in Sai Kung District, Hong Kong.

== Administration ==
Wong Chuk Wan, including Ngong Wo, is a recognized village under the New Territories Small House Policy.

== See also ==
- Sai Kung West Country Park
