= Kung Chau =

Uninhabited island of Hong Kong

弓洲
- Interactive map of Kung Chau

Geography
- Location: East of Grass Island
- Coordinates: 22°29′00″N 114°22′15″E

Administration
- Hong Kong

Demographics
- Population: Uninhabited

Kung Chau
- Traditional Chinese: 弓洲
Transcriptions

Kung Chau (Chinese: 弓洲) is an uninhabited island of Hong Kong, located east of Grass Island.
