= Chek Keng =

Area and village in Hong Kong

Coordinates: 22.421462°N 114.350025°E

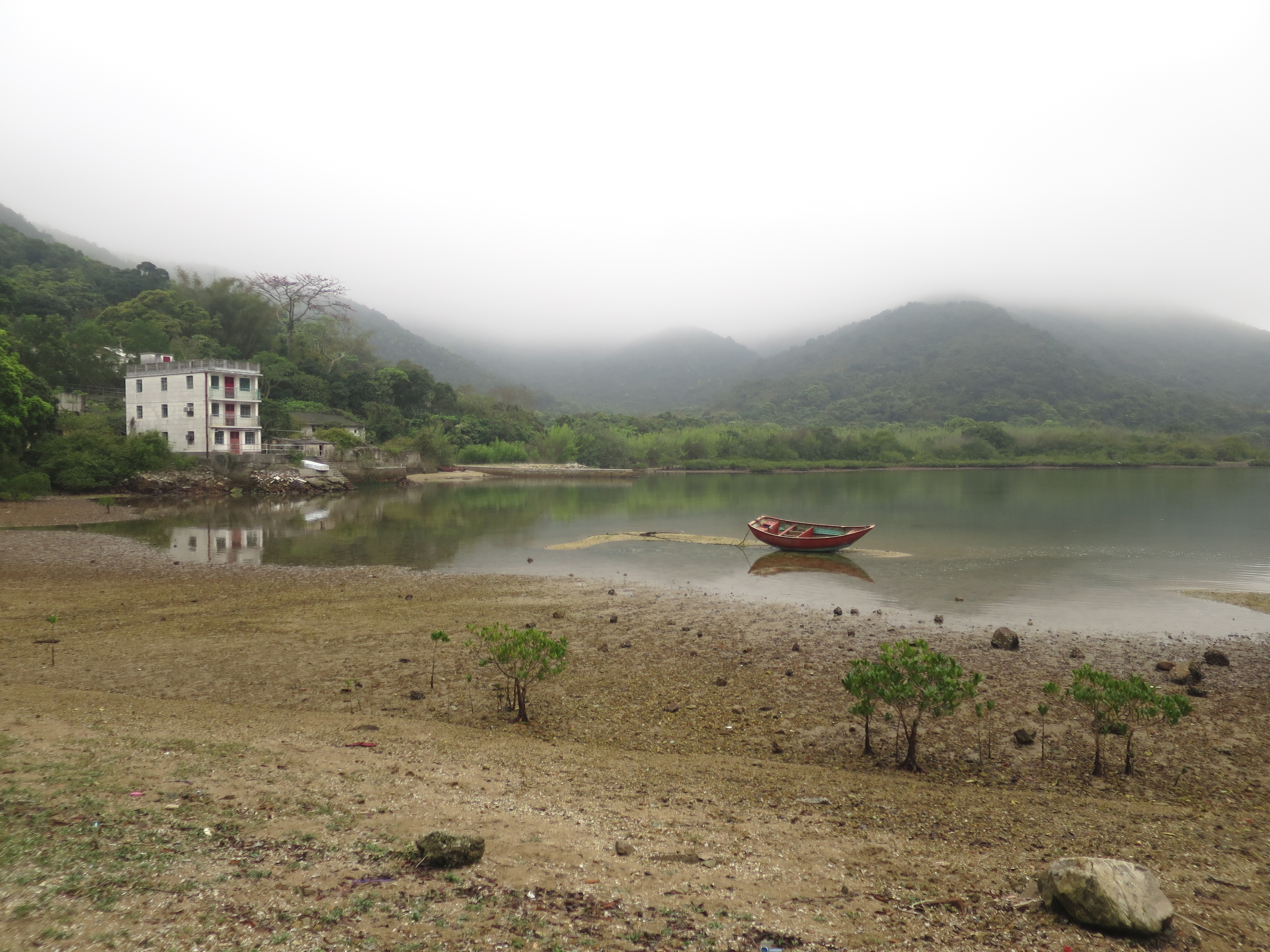
Chek Keng and Chek Keng Hau (赤徑口 on a foggy spring day.

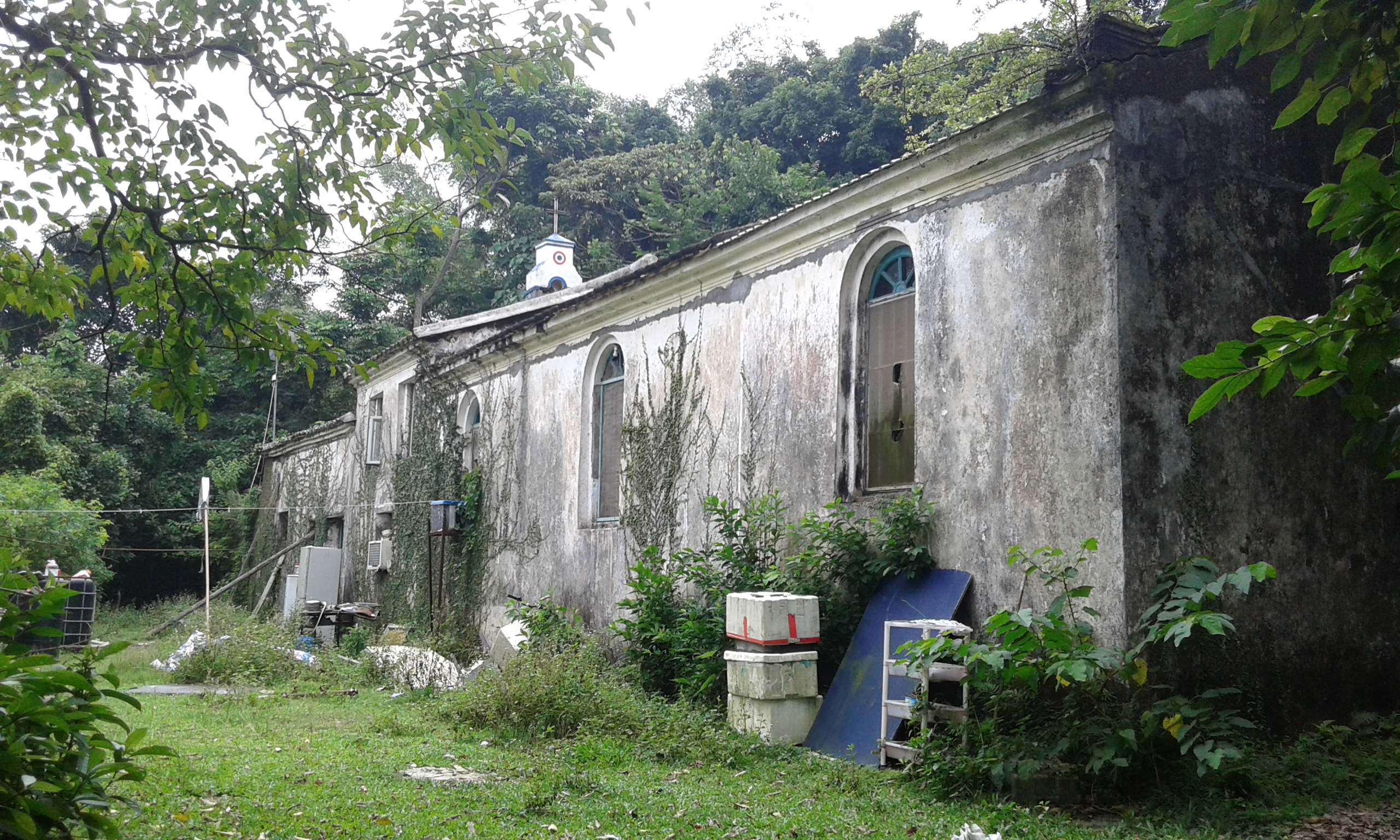
Holy Family Chapel in Chek Keng.

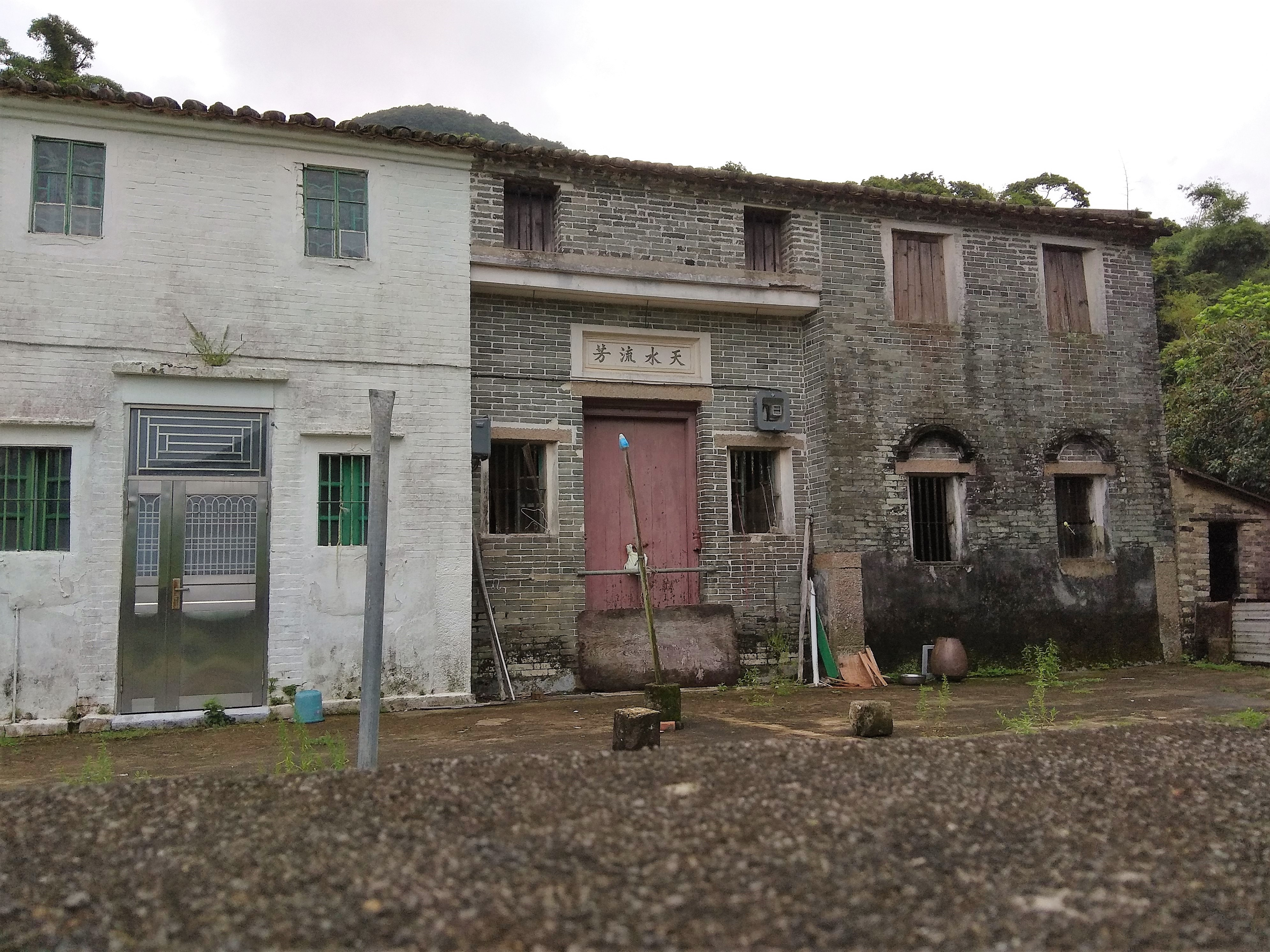
Village houses in Chek Keng.

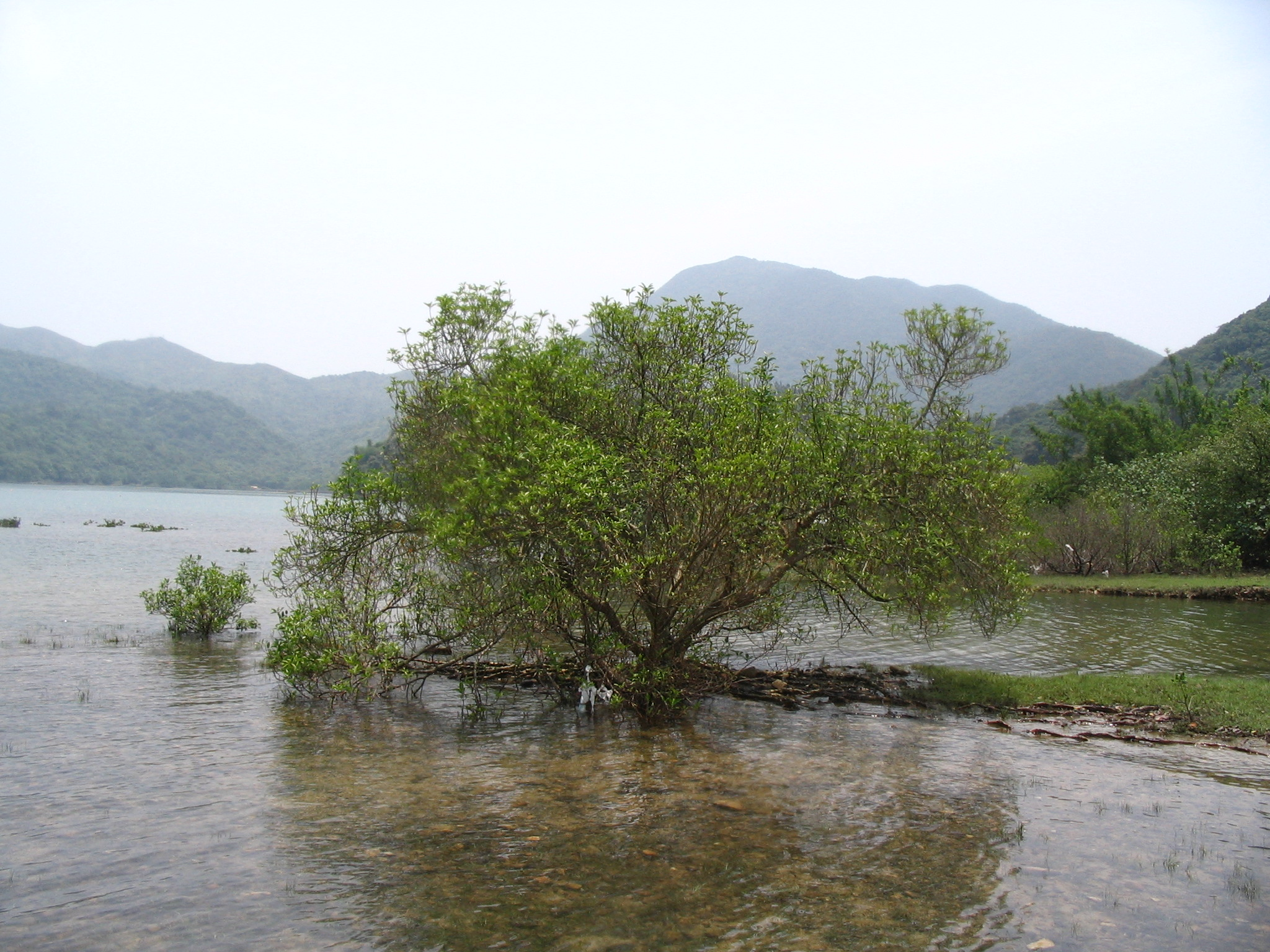
Mangrove at Chek Keng.

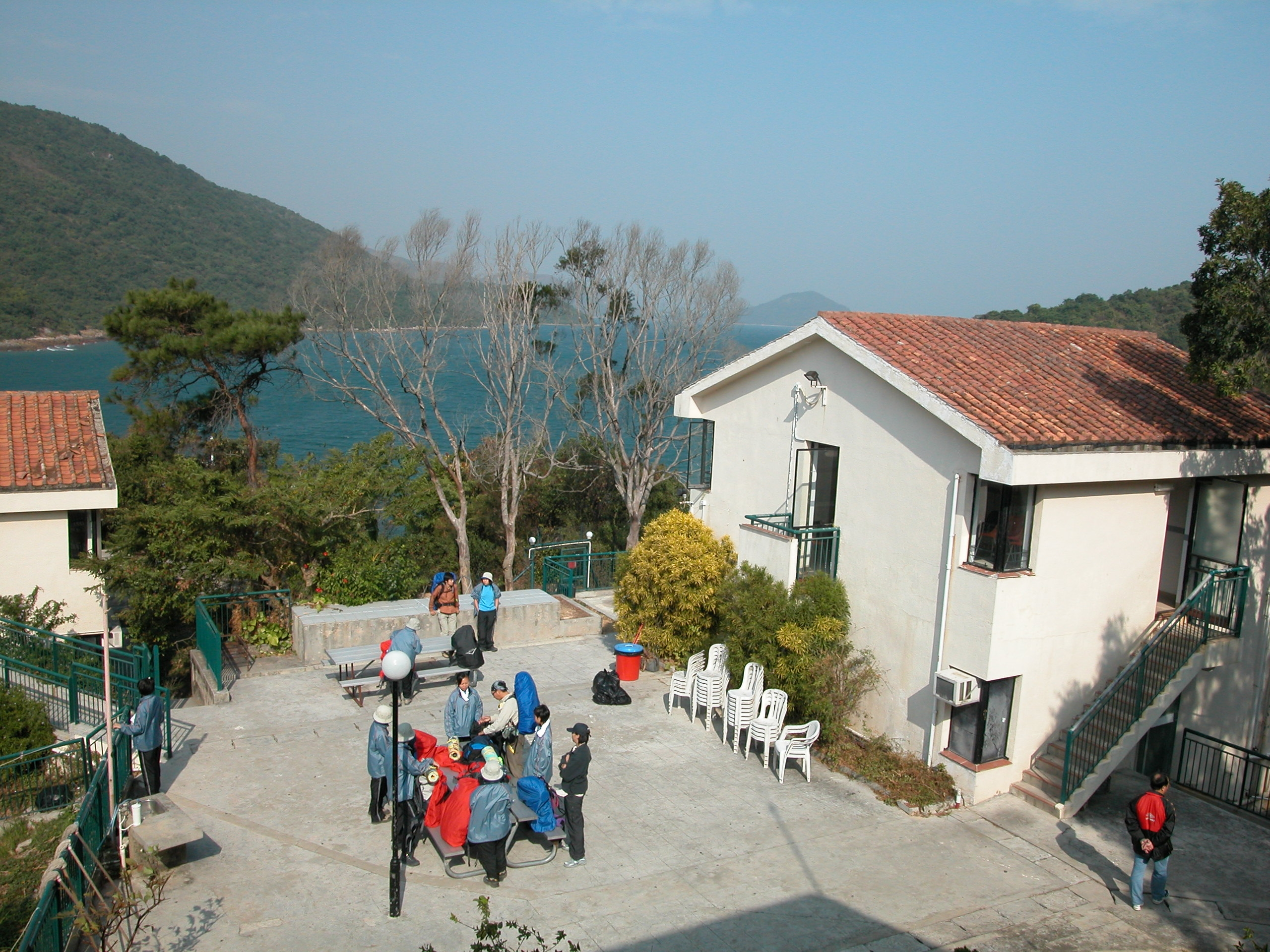
Bradbury Hall youth hostel.

Chek Keng (Chinese: 赤徑) is an area and village of Sai Kung North in Hong Kong. It is administratively part of Tai Po District.

== Location ==
Chek Keng is located within Sai Kung East Country Park, on the northern coast of Sai Kung Peninsula and facing the Chek Keng Hau (赤徑口) a.k.a. East Arm Bay of Long Harbour.

== Administration ==
Chek Keng is a recognized village under the New Territories Small House Policy.

== History ==
Chek Keng was probably founded more than 200 years ago. It was historically a multi-surname Hakka village. It was reported in 2003 that Chek Keng had only one resident, an 84 year old woman.

== Features ==
=== Chapel ===
The Holy Family Chapel (聖家小堂) in Chek Keng was built in 1874 to replace an earlier chapel that had been severely damaged by a storm in 1867. The whole village later converted to Catholicism. During the Japanese Occupation of Hong Kong, the chapel was a base of the Hong Kong-Kowloon Independent Battalion of the East River Guerrilla (東江縱隊港九獨立大隊). The chapel is listed as a Grade II historic building.

=== Others ===
- Chek Keng Pier
- Bradbury Hall youth hostel

== Transportation ==
Chek Keng is not accessible by car. It is located along the Stage 2 of the MacLehose Trail, about an hour's walk from Pak Tam Au.

A kai-to service is available between Wong Shek, Wan Tsai (Nam Fung Wan) and Chek Keng.
