= Sai Kung West Country Park =

Country park on the Sai Kung Peninsula in Hong Kong

Coordinates: 22.4271°N 114.3043°E

- Type: Country park
- Location: Sai Kung Peninsula, New Territories, Hong Kong
- Area: 3,000 hectares (7,400 acres)
- Designated: 3 February 1978; 48 years ago
- Manager: Agriculture, Fisheries and Conservation Department

Sai Kung West Country Park
- Traditional Chinese: 西貢西郊野公園
- Simplified Chinese: 西贡西郊野公园
Transcriptions
Standard Mandarin
- Hanyu Pinyin: Xīgòng Xī Jiāoyě Gōngyuán
Yue: Cantonese
- Jyutping: sai1 gung3 sai1 gaau1 je5 gung1 jyun4*2

Sai Kung West Country Park (Chinese: 西貢西郊野公園) is a 30 square kilometres (12 mi^{2}) country park on the Sai Kung Peninsula in northeast Hong Kong.

Opened in 1978, the park's sights include:

- Wong Chuk Wan (黃竹灣)
- Tai Mong Tsai (大網仔)
- Pak Tam Chung
- Yung Shue O
- Lai Chi Chong
- Hoi Ha Marine Park

== History ==
Sai Kung West Country Park was formally designated on 3 February 1978.

== See also ==
- Sai Kung West Country Park (Wan Tsai Extension)
