= Sai Kung West Country Park (Wan Tsai Extension) =

Country park in Hong Kong

Coordinates: 22.4674°N 114.3412°E

Sai Kung West Country Park (Wan Tsai Extension) (Chinese: 西貢西郊野公園 (灣仔擴建部份)) is a 1.23 square kilometres (0.47 sq mi) country park on the Sai Kung Peninsula in northeast Hong Kong. Opened in 1996, the park's sights include:

- Wan Tsai
- Ocean Point
