= Tap Mun =

Island in New Territories, Hong Kong

Grass Island
塔門
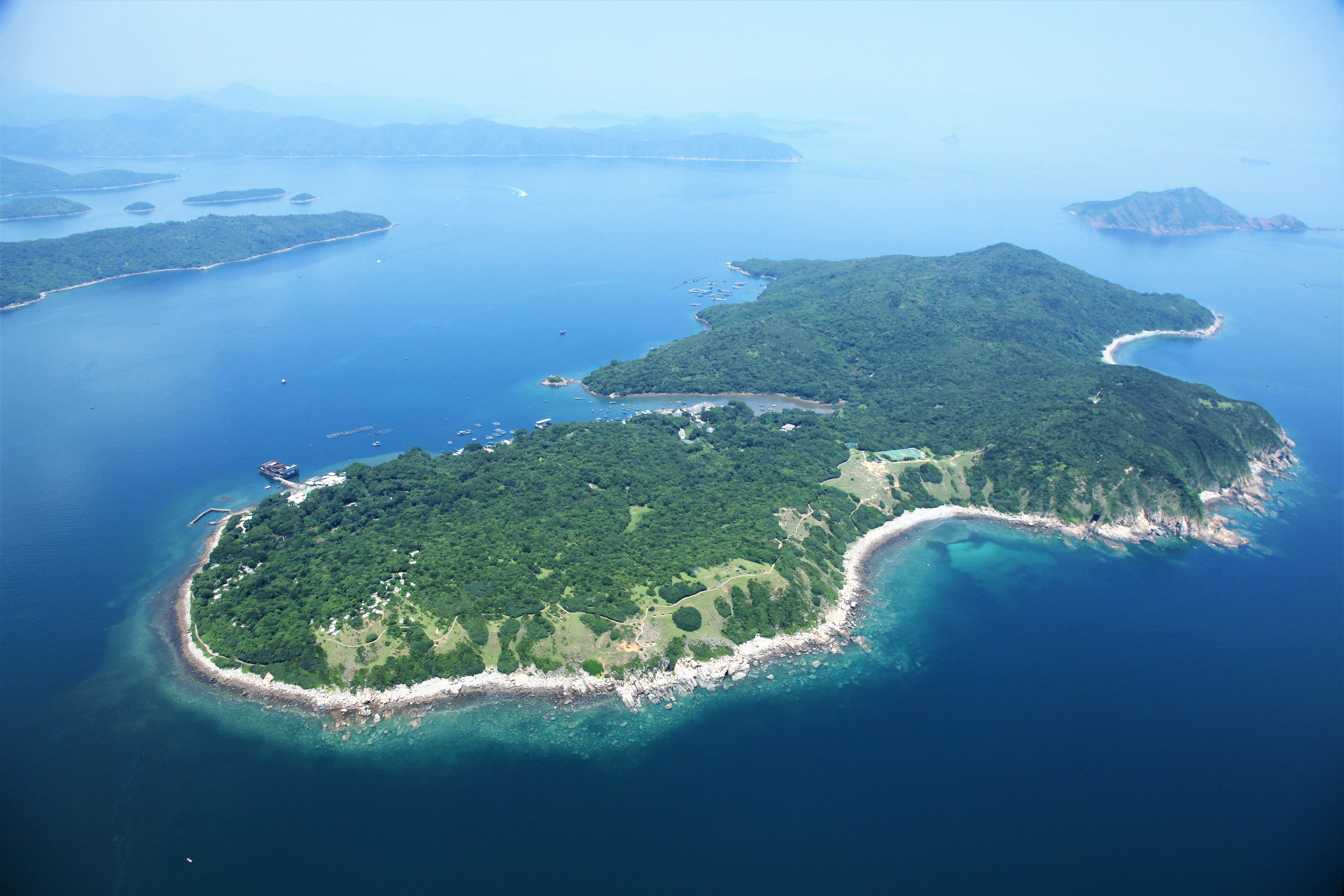

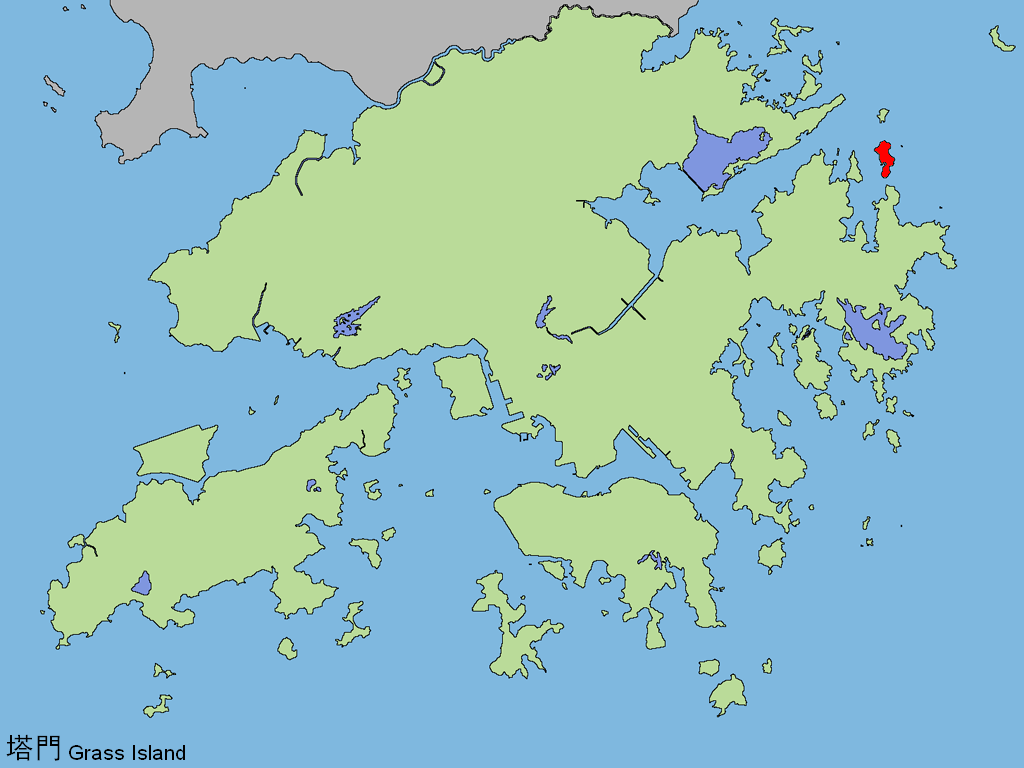
- Map showing the location of Grass Island within Hong Kong

Geography
- Location: Tai Po District
- Coordinates: 22°28′35″N 114°21′45″E
- Area: 1.69 km^{2} (0.65 sq mi)

Administration
- Hong Kong

Demographics
- Population: 100 (approx)

Tap Mun
- Traditional Chinese: 塔門
Transcriptions
Yue: Cantonese
- Yale Romanization: Taap mùhn
- Jyutping: Taap^{3} mun^{4}

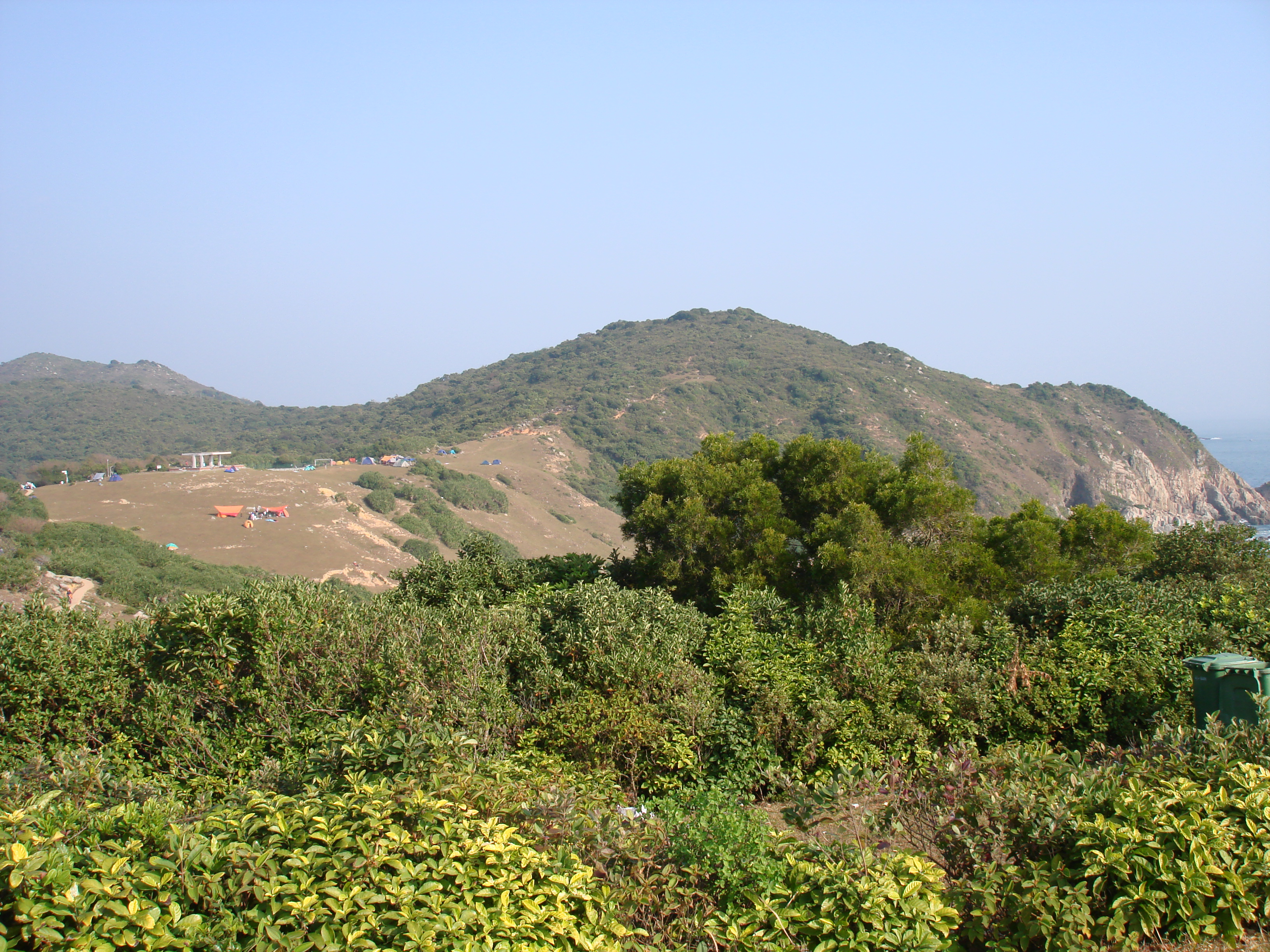
View from a Grass Island hilltop, a campsite can be seen atop the distant hill

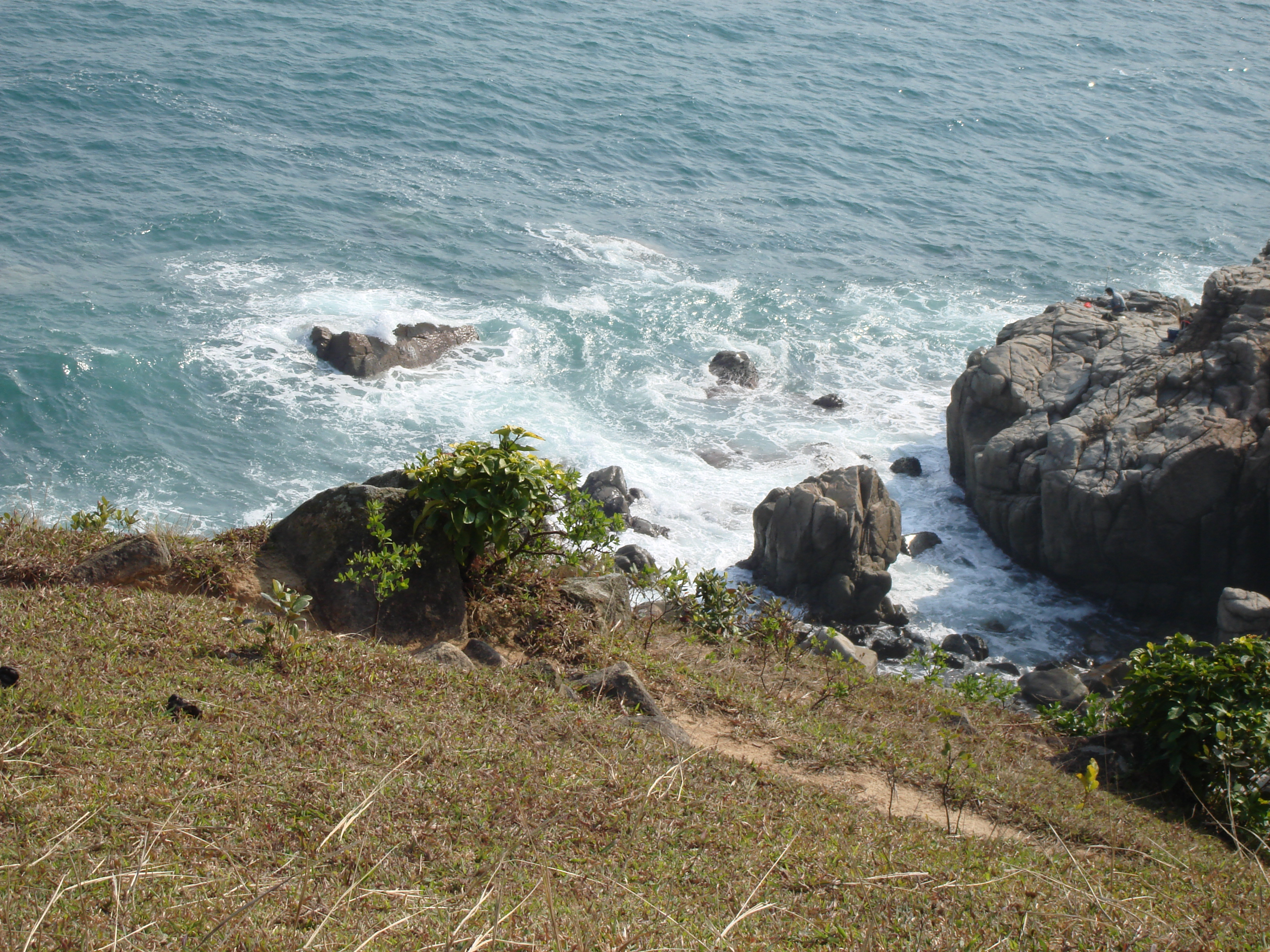
Dirt path on the edge of a Grass Island cliff

Grass Island or Tap Mun is an island in Hong Kong, located in the northeastern part of the territory. Its area is 1.69 km^{2} (0.65 sq mi). Administratively, it is part of the Tai Po District. There are about 100 people living on the island, and feral cattle are known on the island.

== Location ==
Tap Mun is located in the northeastern part of the Hong Kong territory, between Mirs Bay and the North Channel. It lies north of the Sai Kung East Country Park on the Sai Kung Peninsula. To the east is Kung Chau, to the south is the South Channel, to the west is Wan Tsai and to the southwest is Long Harbour.

== History ==
A tablet in the Tin Hau Temple on the island states Tap Mun, as part of Mirs Bay, was registered under the administration of the Dongguan County by the Tsui and Yip clans before 1573 and that they thus held the subsoil (地骨; dei^{6}gwat^{1}; 'the bones of the land') rights as taxpayer under the Customary Land Law. By the late 17th century, Tanka fishermen began to use the anchorage and built the temple, the topsoil (地皮; dei^{6}pei^{4}; 'the skin of the land') rights being granted to them in perpetuity by the subsoil title holders. As a result of a dispute over the land that arose in the mid-18th century, the Magistrate and Prefect of the Dongguan County Court ruled that the Customary Land Law took precedence over the Imperial Law, thus preserving the subsoil:topsoil rights status quo (including the rule that, though the tax-paid land area of the subsoil holder was only the temple itself and its immediately vicinity, the rights of the topsoil holders extended automatically to all adjoining waste and mountainous land, i.e. the entire island). Over time, the first topsoil holder's interest in the land will have passed to an ancestral trust of his family so that by the time of British colonial rule, the effective title holders in the topsoil will have been a trust of the villagers as a whole. The British refused to recognise all subsoil rights (their taxpaying status to the Imperial government being at odds with British sovereignty and its Crown land concept), leaving the only effective right in the land in the hands of the tenant topsoil rights holders, i.e. the village ancestral trust of the Tanka families.

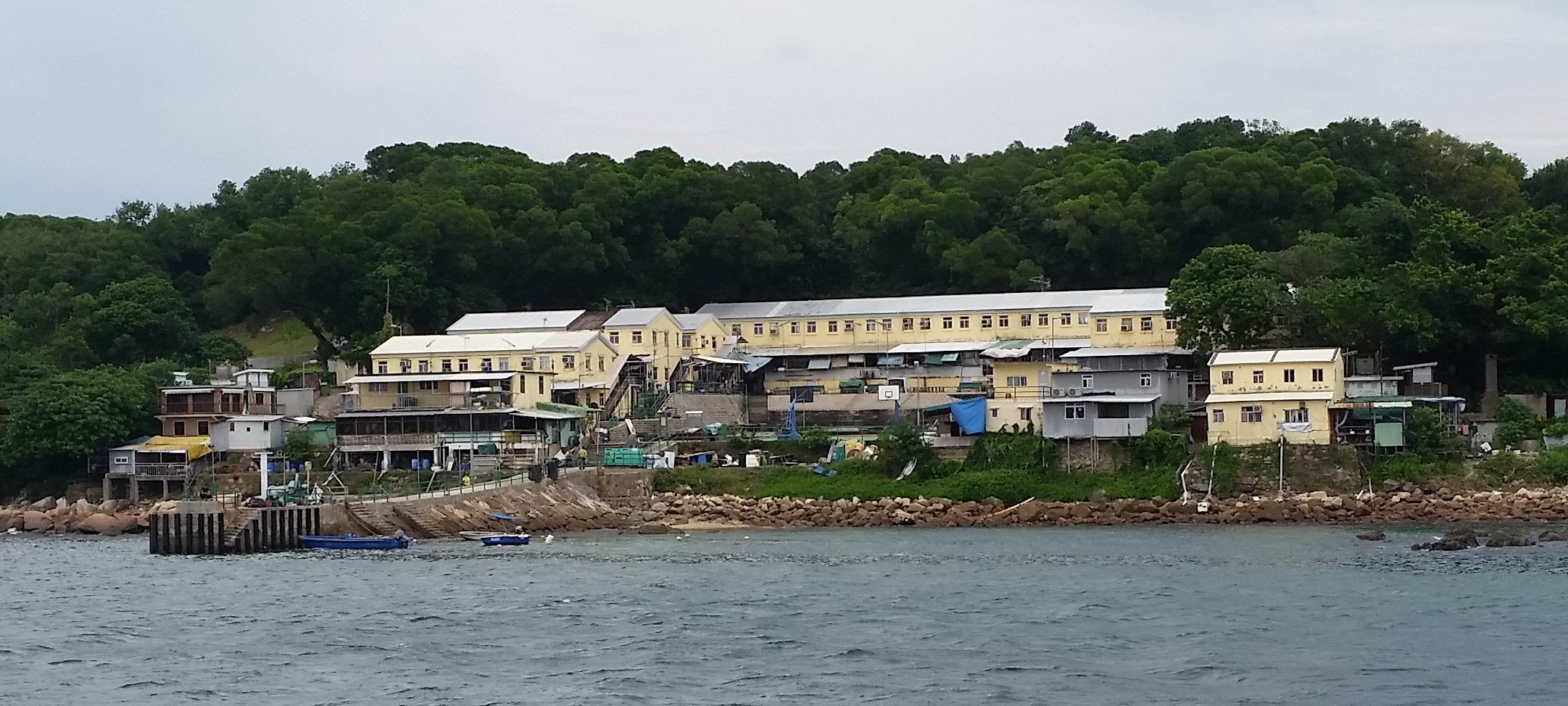
Tap Mun New Fishermen's Village, erected 1964, as seen looking east from Tit Shue Pai.

At the time of the 1911 census, the population of Tap Mun was 253. The number of males was 168.

By the 1960s, the Tankas were living in wretched conditions on the island and, in response to their need, a charity from New Zealand funded the erection of a New Village to house them. The structures, considered an eyesore but functional, were completed in 1964 and continued in use as of 2016.

== Demographics ==
At its peak, Tap Mun had 2,000 residents. However, many moved to the city centre to live. Now many residents run stores or restaurants for local tourists visiting the island. The villagers are mostly farmers, merchants or fishermen. The latter category has recently diminished as many youths from fishing families have chosen to work in the city instead. Due to the population outflow, the last school on the island closed down in 2003.

== Administration ==
Tap Mun is a recognised village under the New Territories Small House Policy.

== Attractions ==
=== Camping ===
The hilltop of Tap Mun is a popular camping site, renowned for the contrast in temperature and wind conditions between day and night. Temperatures drop and winds soar during the nighttime but die down as the day approaches, when the dawn marks the beginning of a temperature rise. It is also well known for providing panoramic views of the surrounding seas, and so provides a brief escape away from busy city life. The very gentle slopes of the hilltops are a favourite amongst campers, although there is the danger of the bordering cliffs.

=== Temples ===
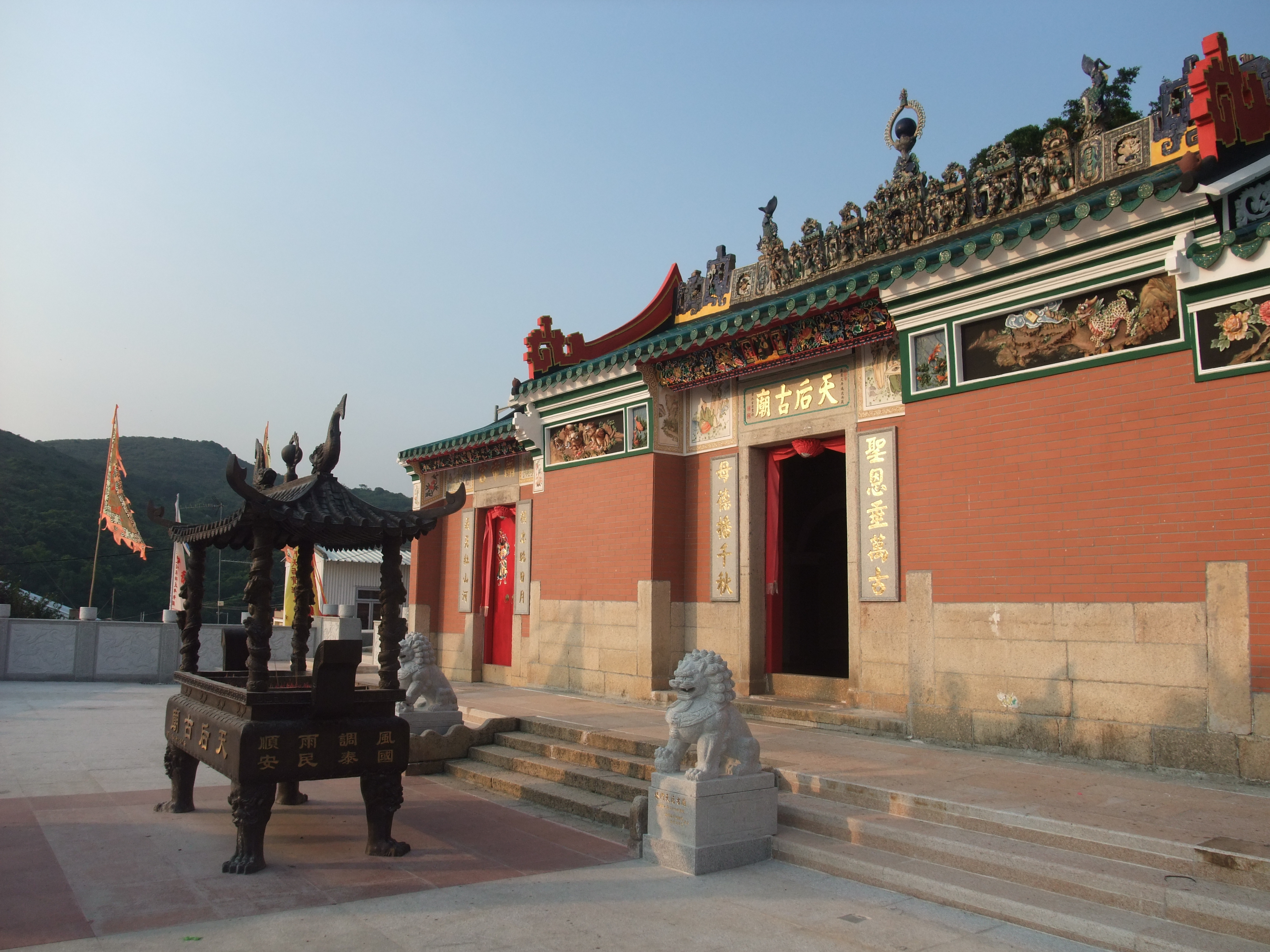
Tin Hau Temple on Grass Island

The temple complex at Tap Mun comprises three temples in two buildings: the first building is a Tin Hau Temple, built in 1737, to which an annex was later added, housing a Kwan Tai Temple. To its south, Shui Yuet Kung (水月宮; 'water moon temple'), built in 1788, is dedicated to Kwun Yam (Guan Yin) and the Earth God. The Tin Hau Temple is a Grade II historic building, while Shui Yuet Kung is listed as Grade III.

On festival days, such as Kwun Yam's birthday, on the 19th day of the second lunar month, many fishermen arrive at Tap Mun to pray for peace and calm. The Tin Hau Festival (天后誕) is celebrated annually on the 23rd day of the third lunar month. In addition, a marine parade is held once every ten years to celebrate the Tin Hau Festival. The temple at Grass Island is one of the two Tin Hau Temples in Hong Kong that have such a marine parade: the other one is the Tin Hau Temple on Leung Shuen Wan (High Island).

=== Dining ===
There is one seafood restaurant and a number of small tea restaurants on the Grass Island, many of which are known for 'ice-less' ice-cold milk tea and boiled squid dishes. Some fishermen of Grass Island make a living by selling their sun-dried catch. Sun-dried fish and shrimp are popular amongst local tourists.

=== Other attractions ===
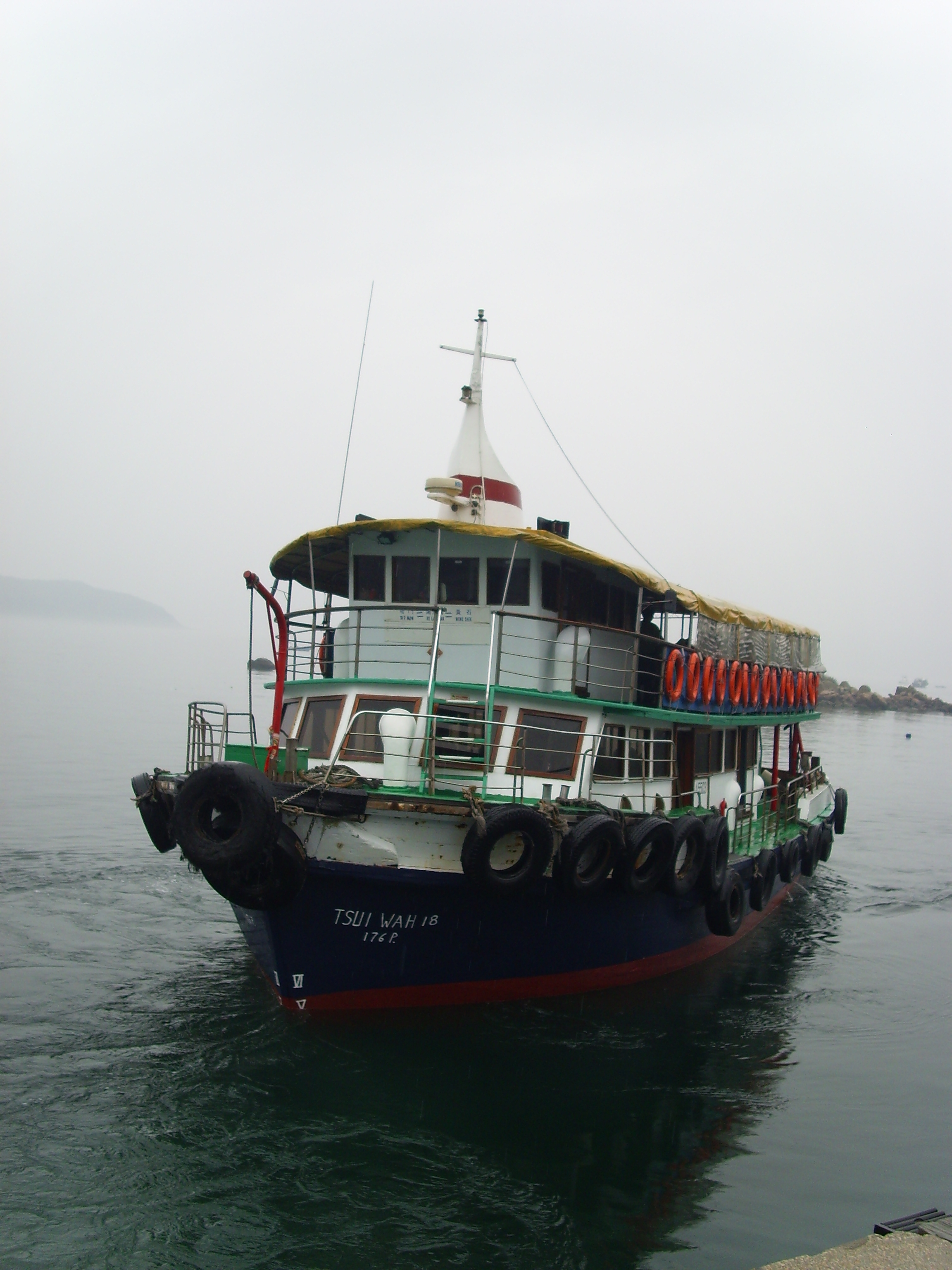
Tsui Wah Ferry at Grass Island.

- Tap Mun Cave (塔門洞)
- Layered Rock
- King Lam School (瓊林學校) was founded before 1913 and was originally housed in the Tin Hau Temple. A dedicated school building with three classrooms was built on the hill in 1957. The school closed in the summer of 2003, due to the low number of students. It is now a Grade III historic building.
- Ngau See Dong, the grave site of a resident buffalo. The skeletal remains of the decomposed buffalo was a spooky sight as it was situated right next to a frequently walked stone path. Although now removed by local officials, the site can still be identified as an unnatural depression into the border of surrounding shrubs.
- The Environmental Protection Department has an Air Pollution Index monitoring station on the island.

== Climate ==
Climate data for Tap Mun (1994–2020)
Month	Jan	Feb	Mar	Apr	May	Jun	Jul	Aug	Sep	Oct	Nov	Dec	Year
Record high °C (°F)	28.6 (83.5)	28.7 (83.7)	30.0 (86.0)	32.8 (91.0)	34.9 (94.8)	37.2 (99.0)	37.4 (99.3)	37.1 (98.8)	36.1 (97.0)	34.3 (93.7)	31.4 (88.5)	28.6 (83.5)	37.4 (99.3)
Mean daily maximum °C (°F)	18.9 (66.0)	19.1 (66.4)	21.3 (70.3)	24.8 (76.6)	28.5 (83.3)	30.9 (87.6)	31.9 (89.4)	31.6 (88.9)	30.7 (87.3)	28.6 (83.5)	25 (77)	20.7 (69.3)	26.0 (78.8)
Daily mean °C (°F)	15.2 (59.4)	15.8 (60.4)	18.2 (64.8)	21.7 (71.1)	25.3 (77.5)	27.5 (81.5)	28.3 (82.9)	27.9 (82.2)	27.3 (81.1)	25.1 (77.2)	21.4 (70.5)	16.7 (62.1)	22.5 (72.6)
Mean daily minimum °C (°F)	12.0 (53.6)	13.2 (55.8)	15.7 (60.3)	19.4 (66.9)	22.9 (73.2)	25.0 (77.0)	25.5 (77.9)	25.3 (77.5)	24.7 (76.5)	22.4 (72.3)	18.5 (65.3)	13.5 (56.3)	19.8 (67.7)
Record low °C (°F)	2.1 (35.8)	3.5 (38.3)	5.6 (42.1)	9.1 (48.4)	15.1 (59.2)	19.6 (67.3)	21.6 (70.9)	22.4 (72.3)	18.1 (64.6)	14.8 (58.6)	7.9 (46.2)	3.6 (38.5)	2.1 (35.8)
Average precipitation mm (inches)	38.4 (1.51)	39.9 (1.57)	70.7 (2.78)	154.1 (6.07)	277.1 (10.91)	397.9 (15.67)	300.3 (11.82)	355.0 (13.98)	215.7 (8.49)	59.7 (2.35)	35.0 (1.38)	26.6 (1.05)	1,970.4 (77.58)
Average relative humidity (%)	77	80	83	86	87	88	86	87	83	79	77	73	82
Source: Hong Kong Observatory (humidity 1994-2016)

== Transportation ==
Grass Island is served by Tsui Wah Ferry Service. The ferry/kai-to services are available from:

1. Wong Shek Pier in Sai Kung; about once every two hours, with higher frequency on weekends and holidays.
2. Ma Liu Shui Pier near Chinese University in Tai Po; twice daily, with an extra departure on weekends and holidays.

== See also ==
- Fishermen villages in Hong Kong
