= Pak Tam Au =

Area in the New Territories of Hong Kong

Coordinates: 22.420089°N 114.332527°E

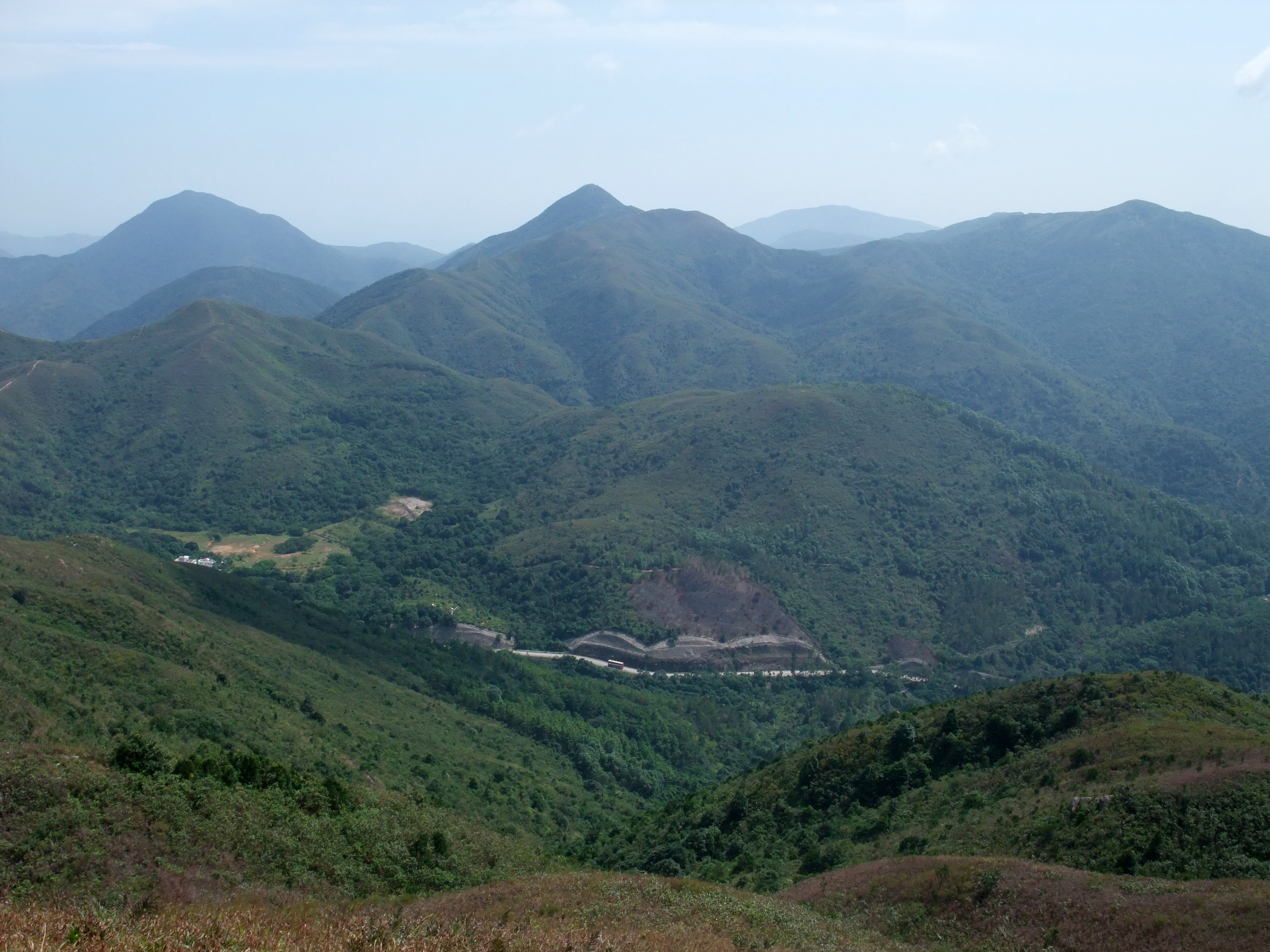
View of Pak Tam Road at Pak Tam Au

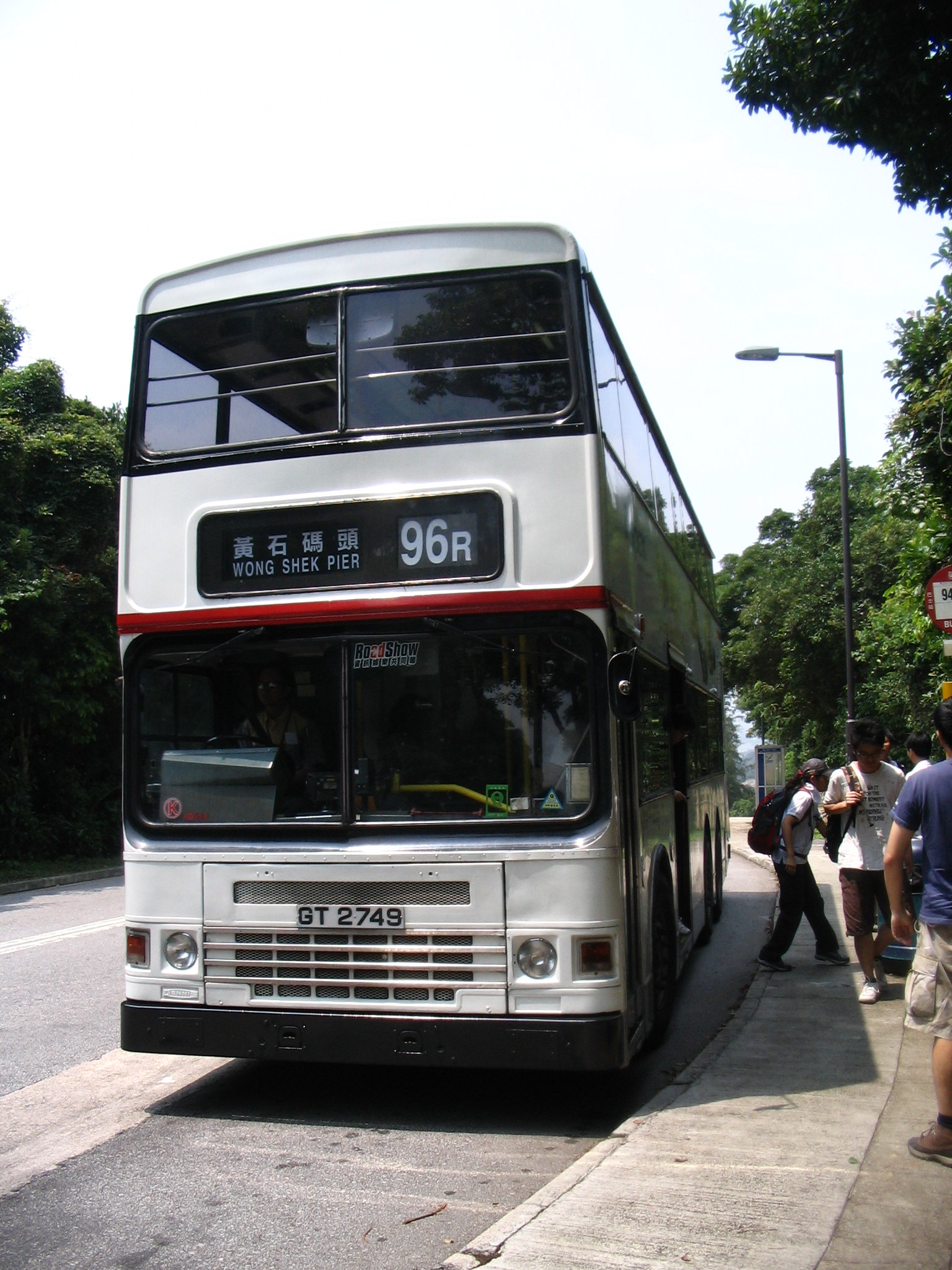
Pak Tam Au bus stop along Pak Tam Road

Pak Tam Au (Chinese: 北潭凹) is an area within the Sai Kung East Country Park, on the Sai Kung Peninsula in the New Territories of Hong Kong. It is administratively under the Tai Po District.

== Village ==
The small village at Pak Tam Au is said to have a history dating back to the second half of the 17th century. It was first settled by members of the Ho (何) and Chan (陳) families coming from Liaoning province. The Chans first settled in Ting Kok and then moved to the village. Historically, the villagers were mainly farmers growing rice and vegetable and rearing pigs and poultry. They collected firewood, which they sold to the lime and brick kilns in Pak Tam Chung.

Pak Tam Au is a recognized village under the New Territories Small House Policy.

== Tourism ==
Pak Tam Au, located at the junction between stages 2 and 3 of the MacLehose Trail, is a popular starting point for hiking activities. It is also the site of a campsite managed by the Agriculture, Fisheries and Conservation Department.

== Transportation ==
Pak Tam Au is served by Pak Tam Road (北潭路) and the Pak Tam Au bus stop.
