= Wan Tsai =

Peninsula at the Sai Kung Peninsula in Hong Kong

Coordinates: 22°28′2″N 114°20′33″E

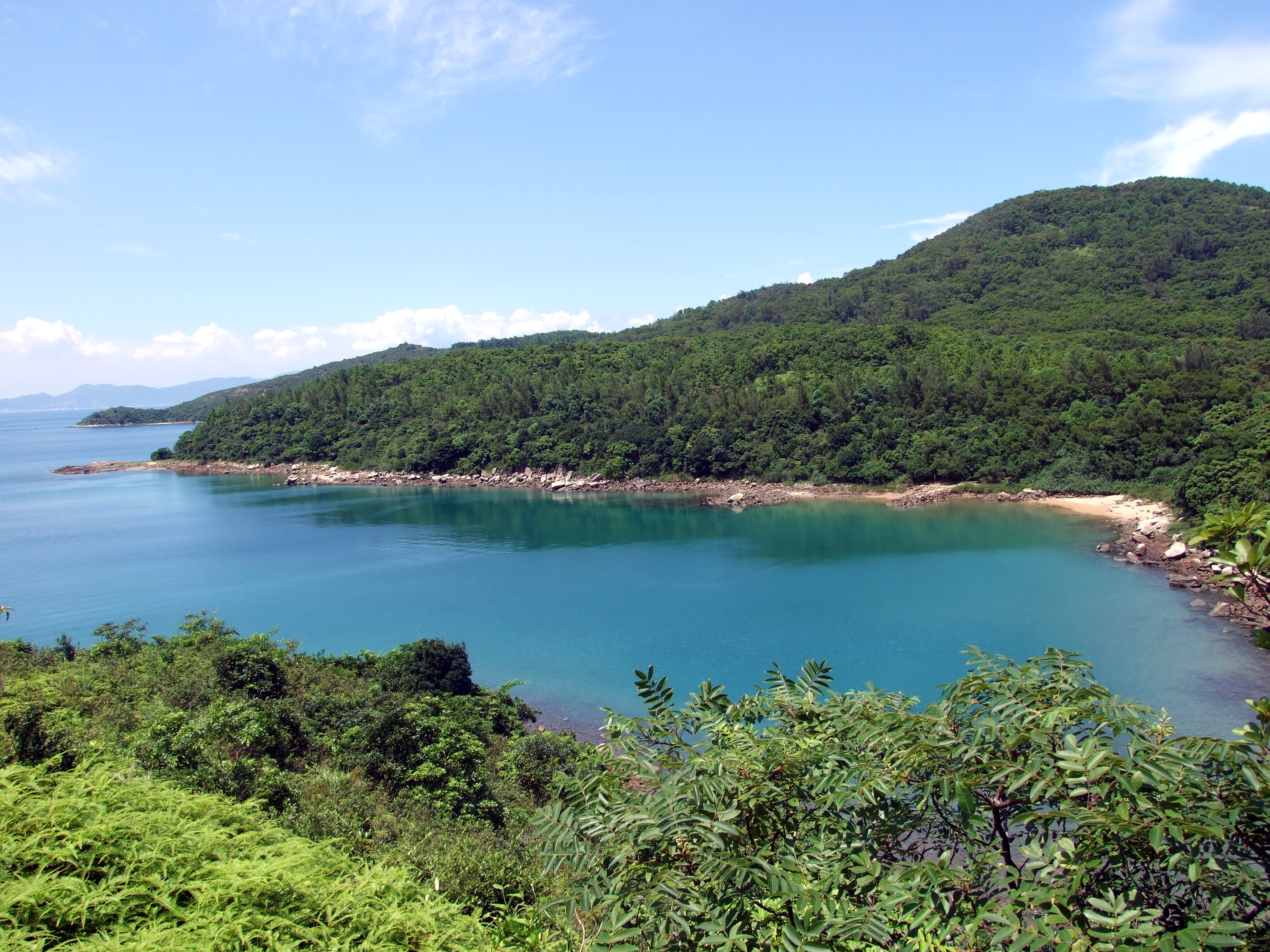
Western coast of Wan Tsai Peninsula.

Location of Wan Tsai within HKSAR.

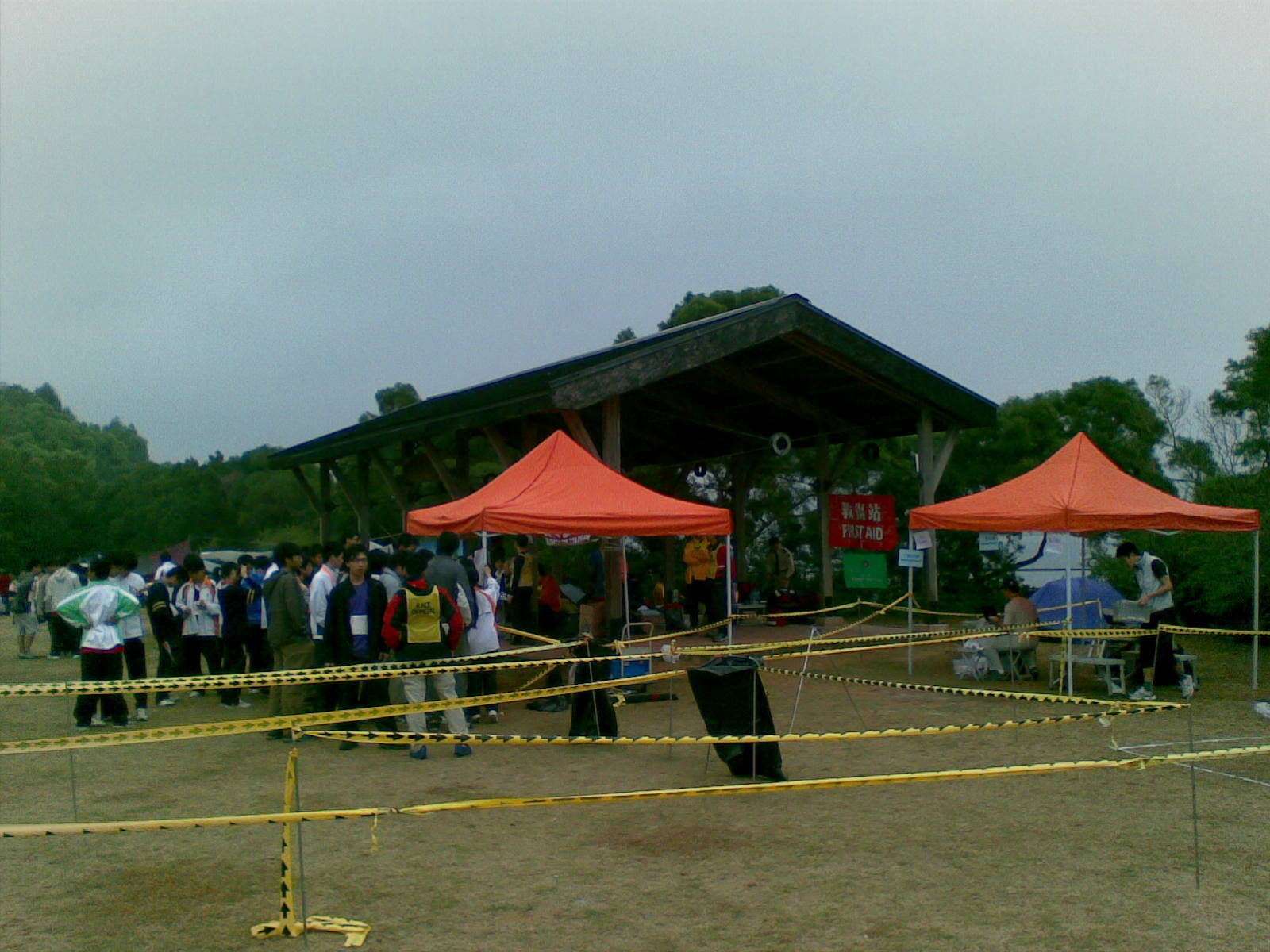
South campsite of Wan Tsai.

Wan Tsai (Chinese: 灣仔; Sidney Lau: Waan^{1} Jai^{2}) is a peninsula at the northern extremity of the north-western Sai Kung Peninsula, Hong Kong, with Hoi Ha Wan to its west and Long Harbour on its east. Grass Island lies east of the peninsula.

== Geography ==
Joined to the mainland by an isthmus at Lan Lo Au, Wan Tsai consists of the two hills Tai Leng Tun and Nam Fung Shan. Its northern tip is Ocean Point (棺材角; Goon^{1} Choi^{4} Gok^{3}).

== Facilities ==
Facilities are available at Wan Tsai for camping.

== Scouts ==
The Scout Association of Hong Kong organised a Jamboree for all Hong Kong and international Scouts on the peninsula for a week between 1999 and 2000 to celebrate the millennium. Another Jamboree was held there in 2001 to celebrate 90 years of Hong Kong Scouting.

== Conservation ==
The peninsula had been a restricted area before being opened to the public in late 1999. Since 1996, the peninsula has been designated the Wan Tsai Extension of Sai Kung West Country Park.

== Access ==
Wan Tsai is reachable by ferry from Wong Shek Pier in Wong Shek, situated on the south-western shore of Long Harbour.
