= Wong Shek Pier =

Public pier on the shore of Long Harbour in Hong Kong

Coordinates: 22.435590°N 114.337319°E

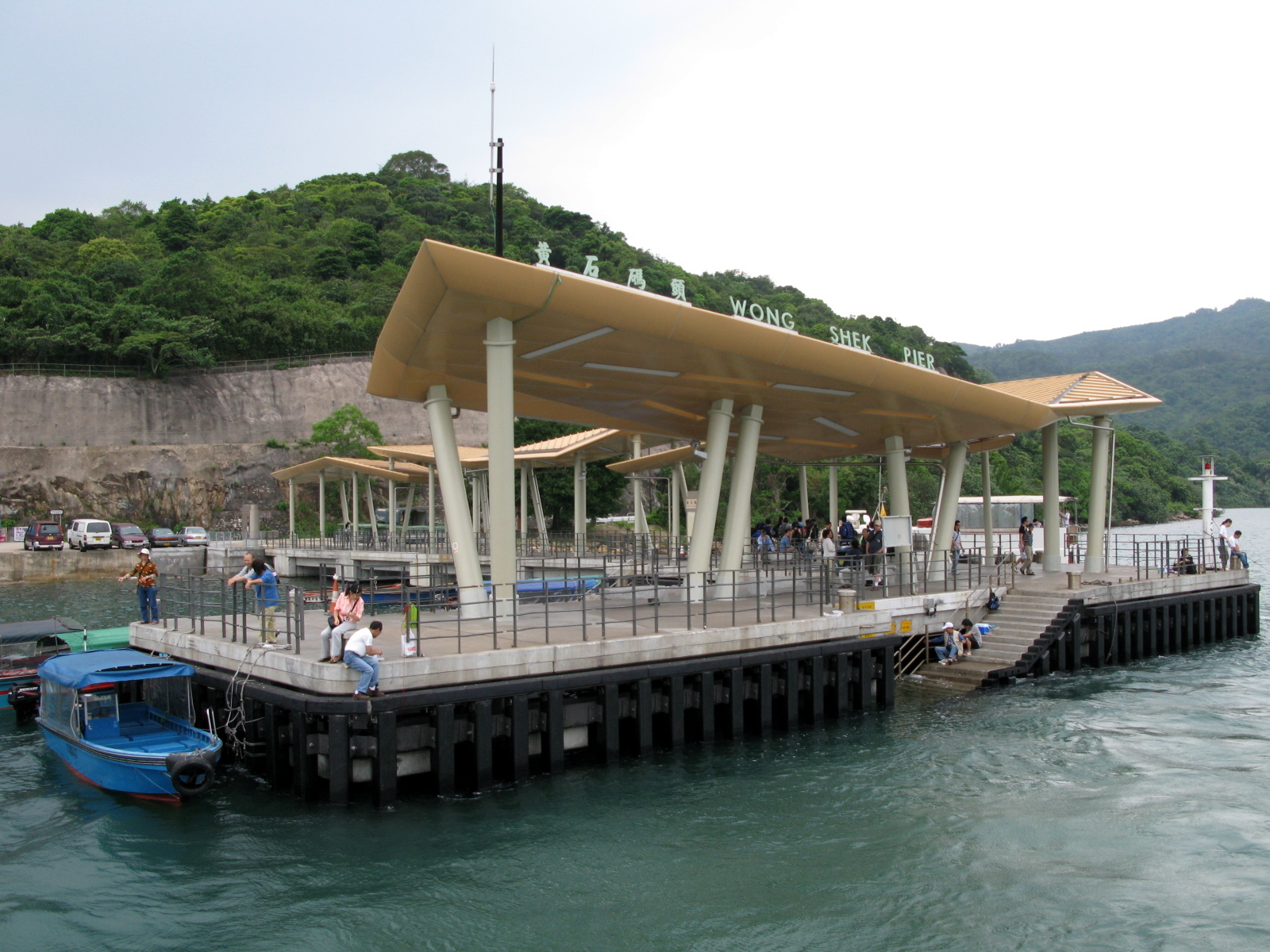
Wong Shek Pier after redevelopment

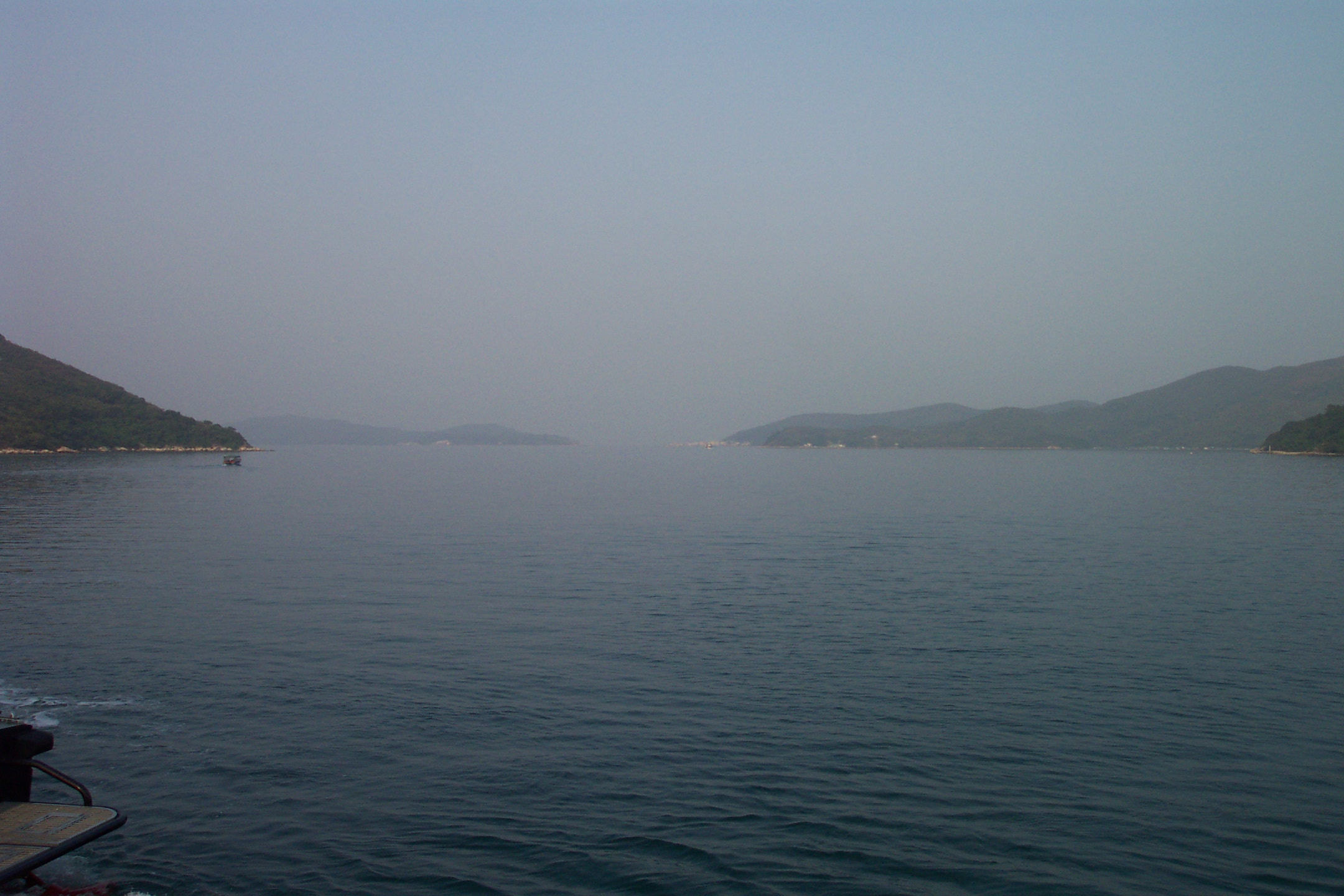
View down Long Harbour from the Wong Shek Pier

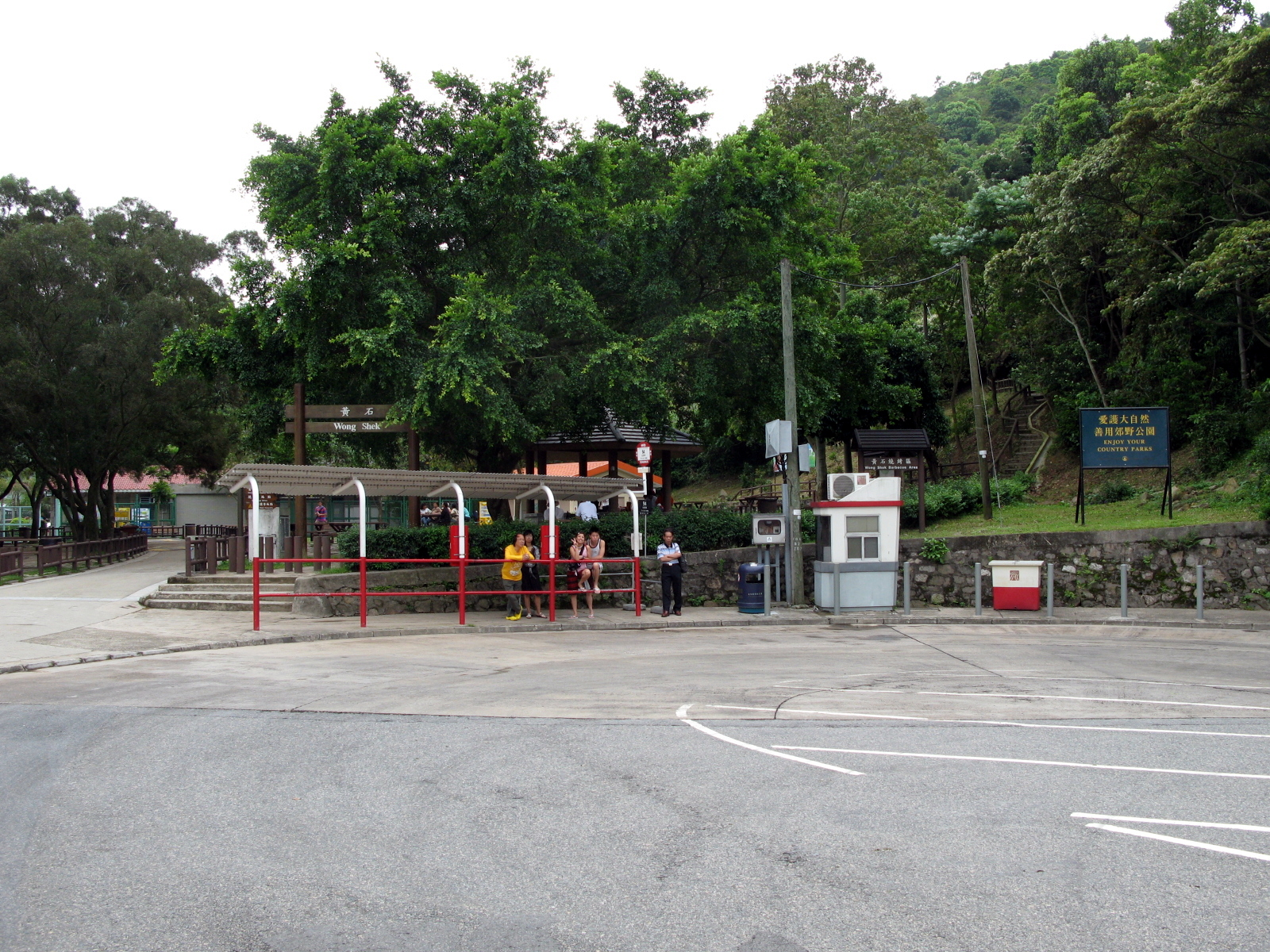
Wong Shek Pier Bus Terminus

Wong Shek Pier (Chinese: 黃石碼頭) is a public pier on the shore of Long Harbour (赤徑海) in the north-east of Hong Kong's New Territories. It is situated in the Wong Shek (黃石) area of the Sai Kung Peninsula. Administratively it is in Tai Po District.

The pier serves kai-to ferry routes to remote settlements on the peninsular and its outlying islands, such as Tap Mun (塔門), Wan Tsai (灣仔) and Chek Keng (赤徑), and provides their principal connection to the rest of Hong Kong. It was reconstructed in 2006.

== Transportation ==
=== Kowloon Motor Bus ===
- Route #94 - from Sai Kung Bus Terminus
- Route #96R - from Diamond Hill MTR Station
- Route #289R - from Sha Tin Central (New Town Plaza) Bus Terminus

Note: All routes ending in “R” run only on weekends and public holidays.

=== Kai-to ===
- Ma Liu Shui - Sham Chung - Lai Chi Chong - Tap Mun - Ko Lau Wan - Chek Keng - Wong Shek Pier
- Wong Shek Pier - Chek Keng - Tap Mun
- Wong Shek Pier - Wan Tsai - Chek Keng
