= Nai Chung =

Coordinates: 22.430940°N 114.257096°E

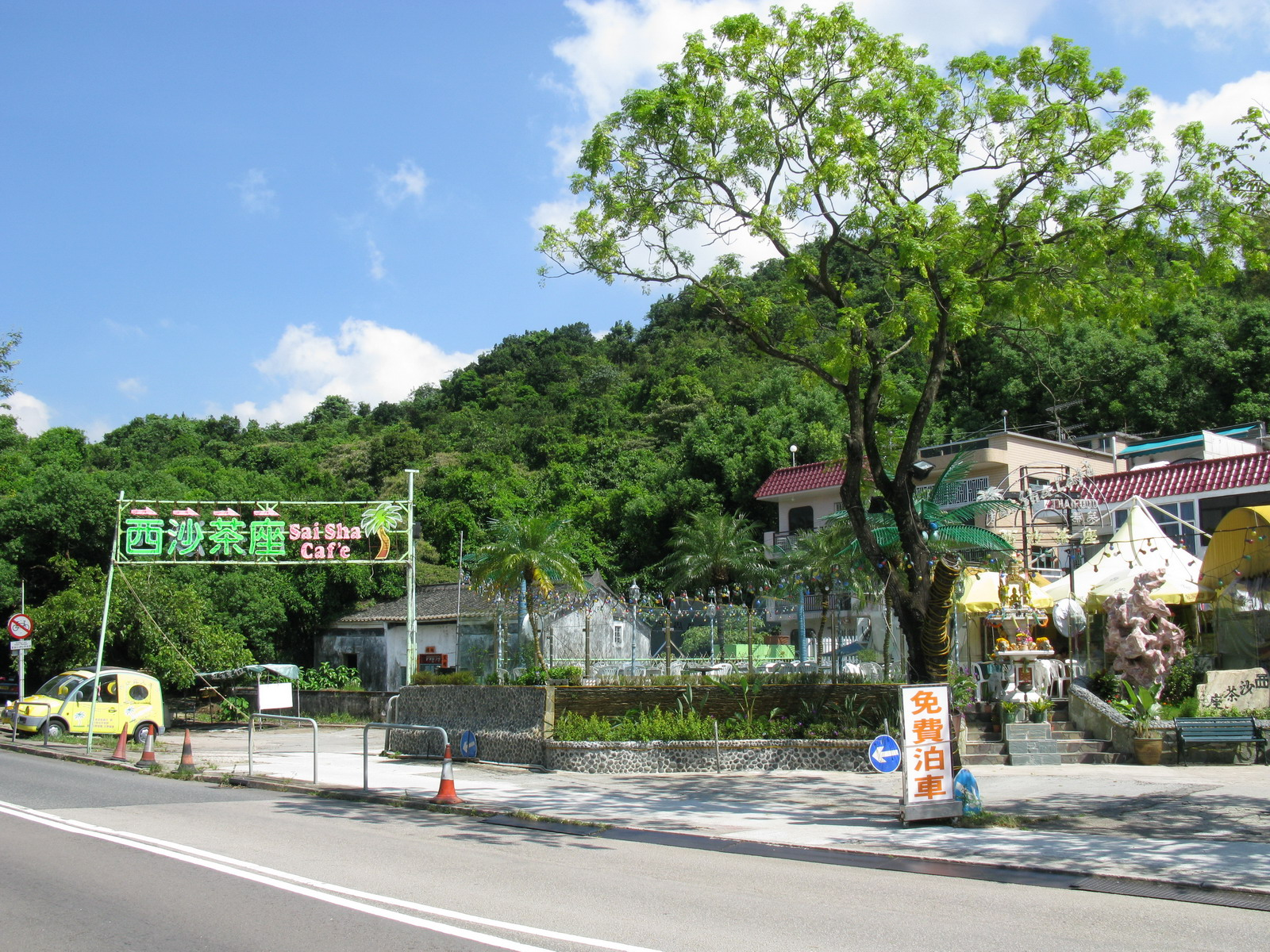
- Sai Sha Cafe along Sai Sha Road in Nai Chung
- Chinese: 泥涌
Transcriptions
Standard Mandarin
- Hanyu Pinyin: níchōng
Yue: Cantonese
- Jyutping: nai4 cung1
- IPA: [nɐ̏i tsʰʊ́ŋ]

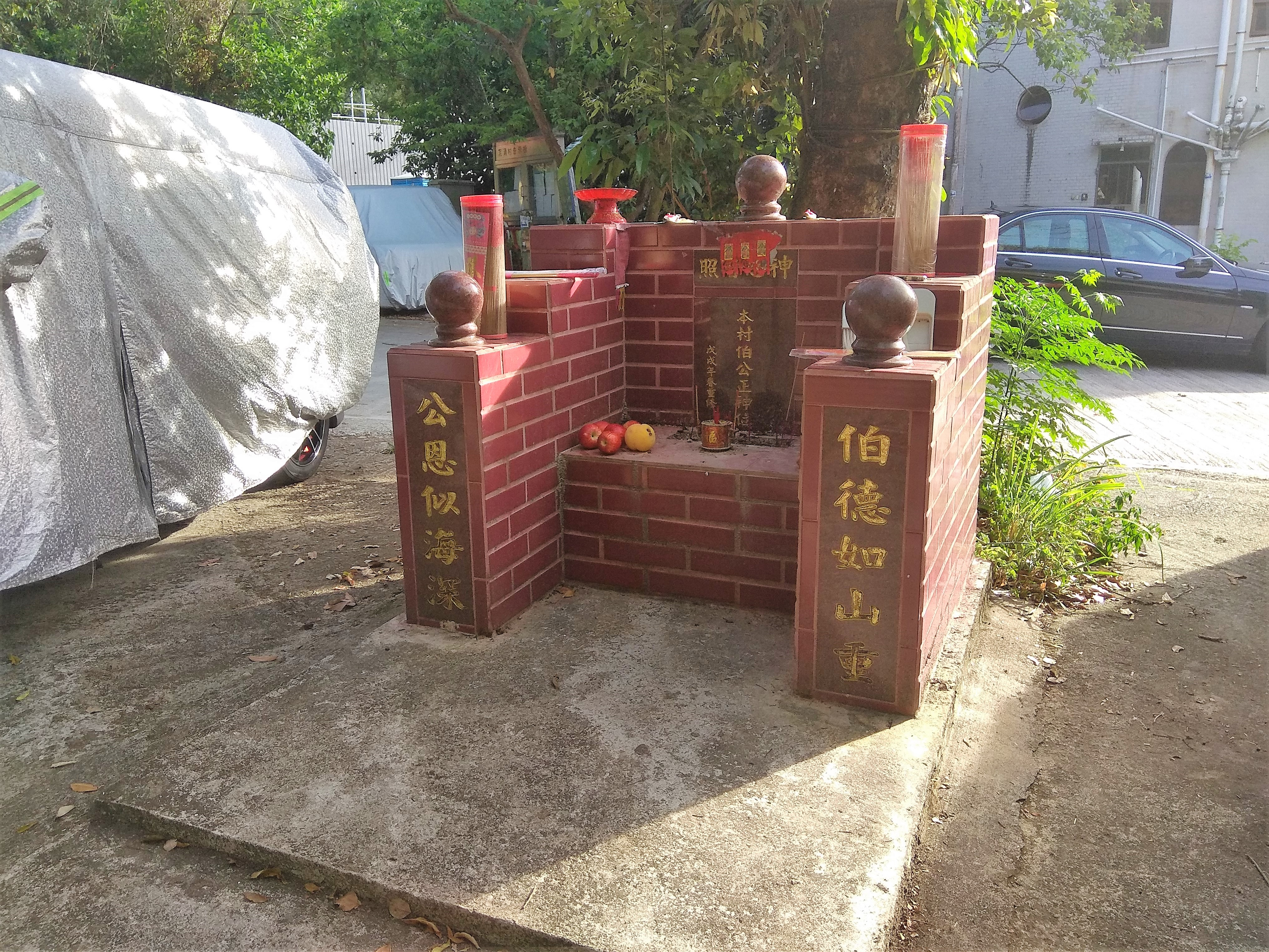
Earth God shrine in Nai Chung Old Village.

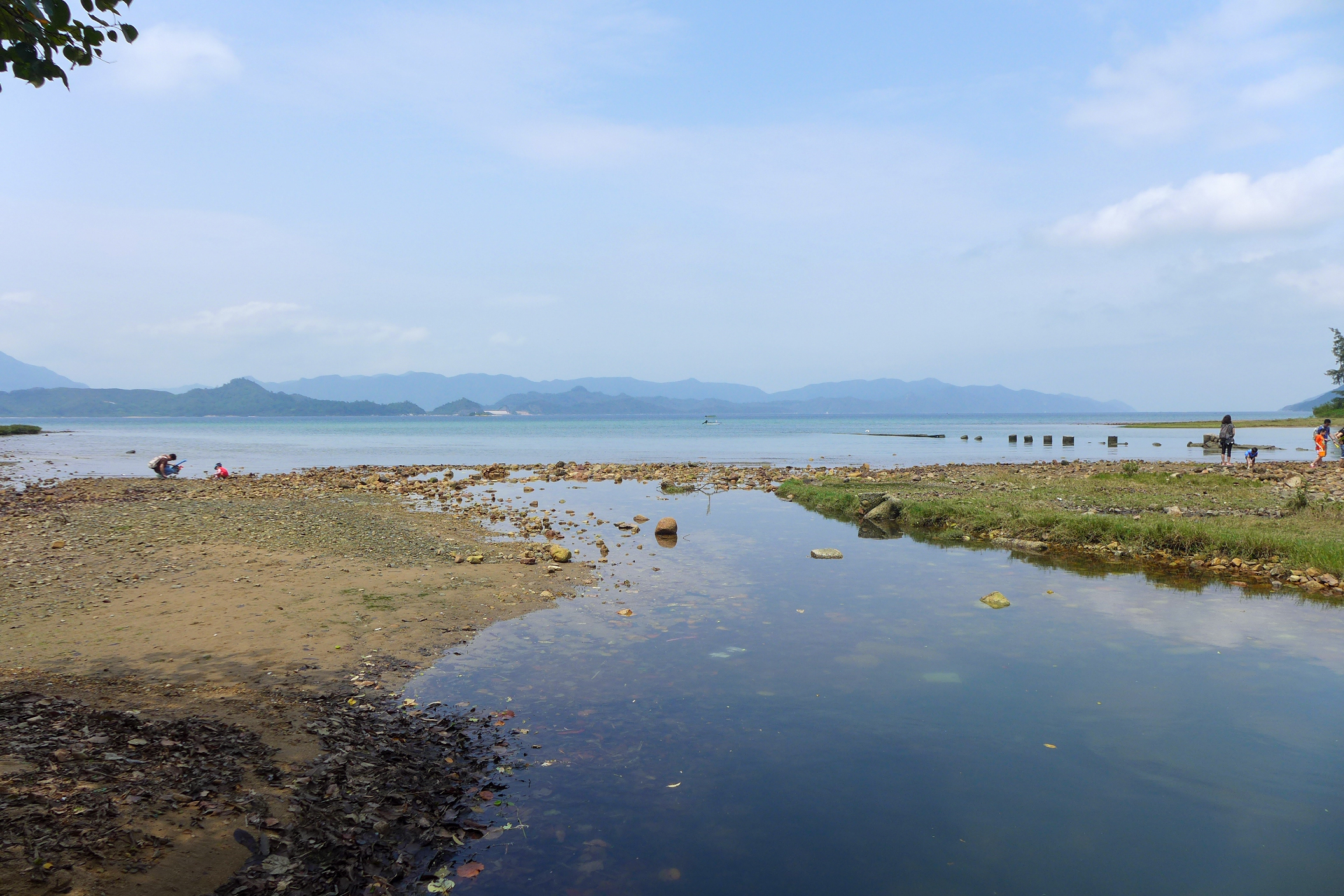
Nai Chung Pebbles Beach (泥涌石灘) facing Tolo Channel.

Nai Chung is a countryside and a village in northeastern New Territories, Hong Kong. It is located at the east of Ma On Shan, partly lying within the Ma On Shan Country Park. Nai Chung lies in a larger area collectively known as Shap Sze Heung.

== Administration ==
Despite its proximity to the neighbouring areas administered by Sha Tin and Sai Kung districts, Nai Chung is actually administered by Tai Po District. It is covered by the Sai Kung North constituency of the Tai Po District Council, which is currently represented by Ben Tam Yi-pui. Nai Chung is a recognized village under the New Territories Small House Policy.

== Features ==
It contains barbecue sites, which are popular destinations of school picnics, and some restaurants that serve Thai and Indian food.

== See also ==
- Sai O, another village of Shap Sze Heung, located directly West of Nai Chung
- Che Ha and Kwun Hang, two villages of Shap Sze Heung, located directly East of Nai Chung
