= Ma Kwu Lam =

Village in Hong Kong

Coordinates: 22.426746°N 114.262788°E

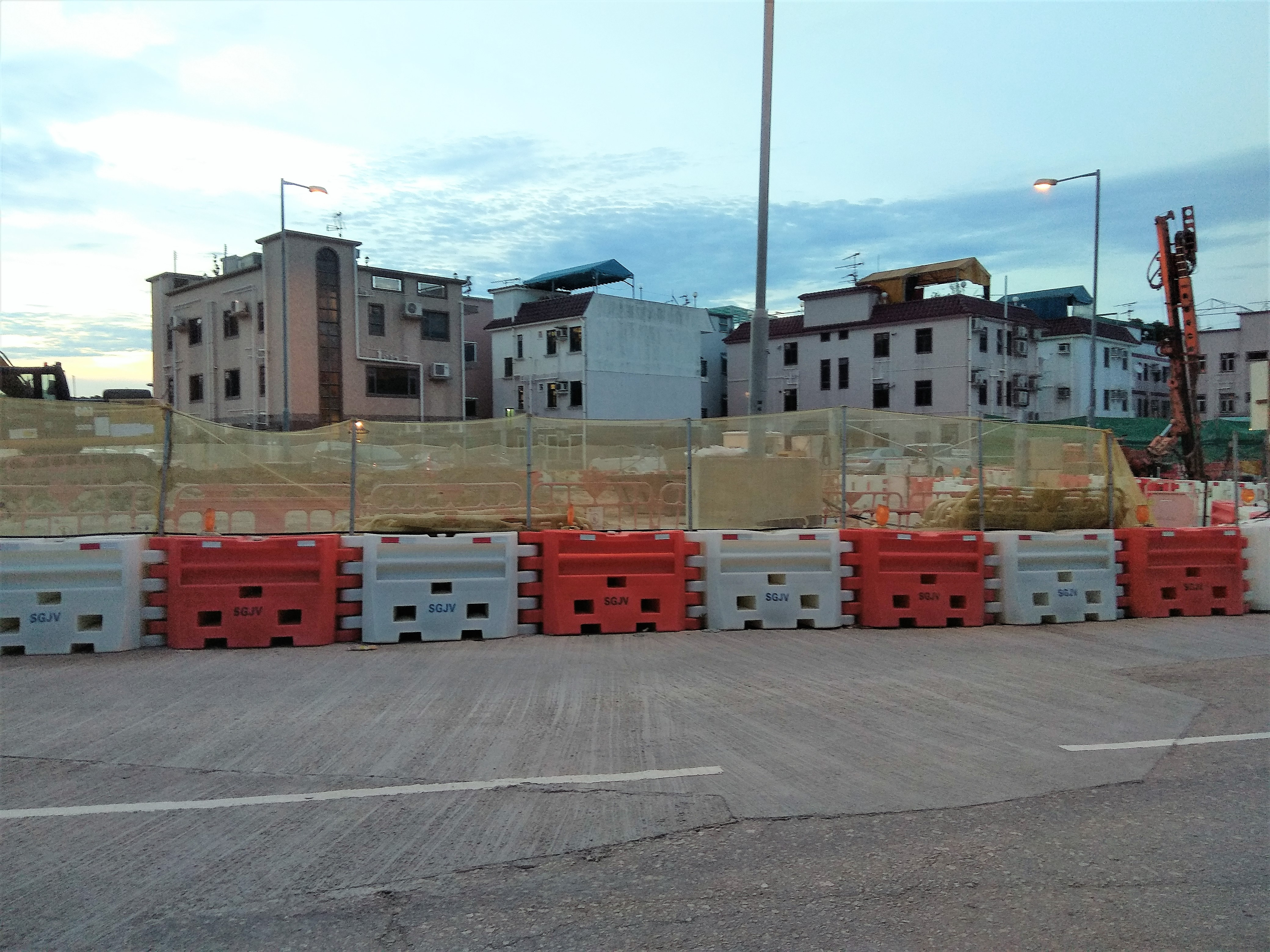
Ma Kwu Lam.

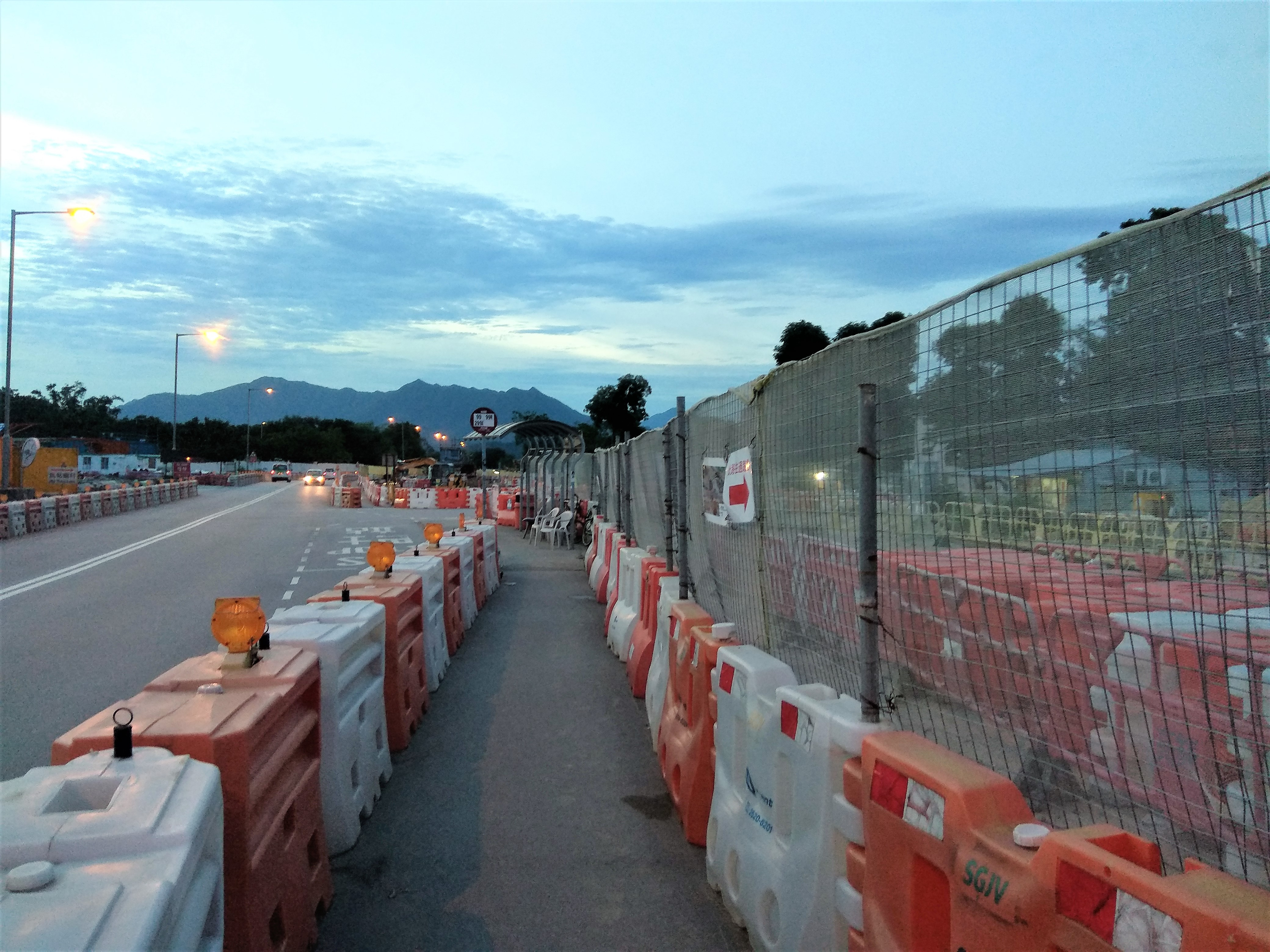
Ma Kwu Lam bus stop along Sai Sha Road. The Pat Sin Leng mountain range is visible in the background.

Ma Kwu Lam (Chinese: 馬牯纜) is a village of the Shap Sze Heung area of Sai Kung North, in Tai Po District, Hong Kong.

== Administration ==
Ma Kwu Lam is a recognized village under the New Territories Small House Policy.

== History ==
At the time of the 1911 census, the population of Ma Kwu Lam was 63. The number of males was 27.
