= Sai O =

Village in Hong Kong

Coordinates: 22.430016°N 114.254276°E

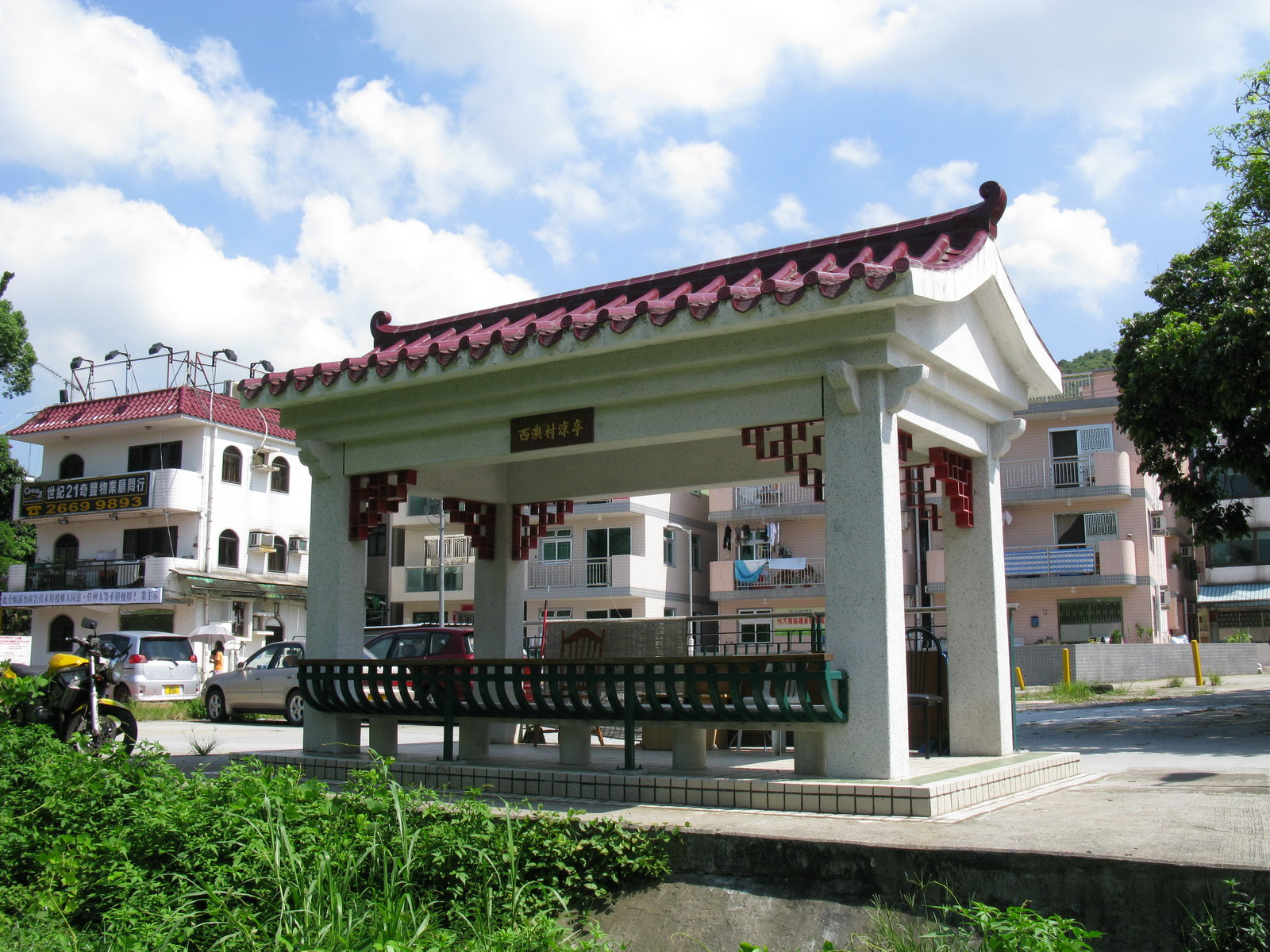
Pavilion in Sai O in August 2008.

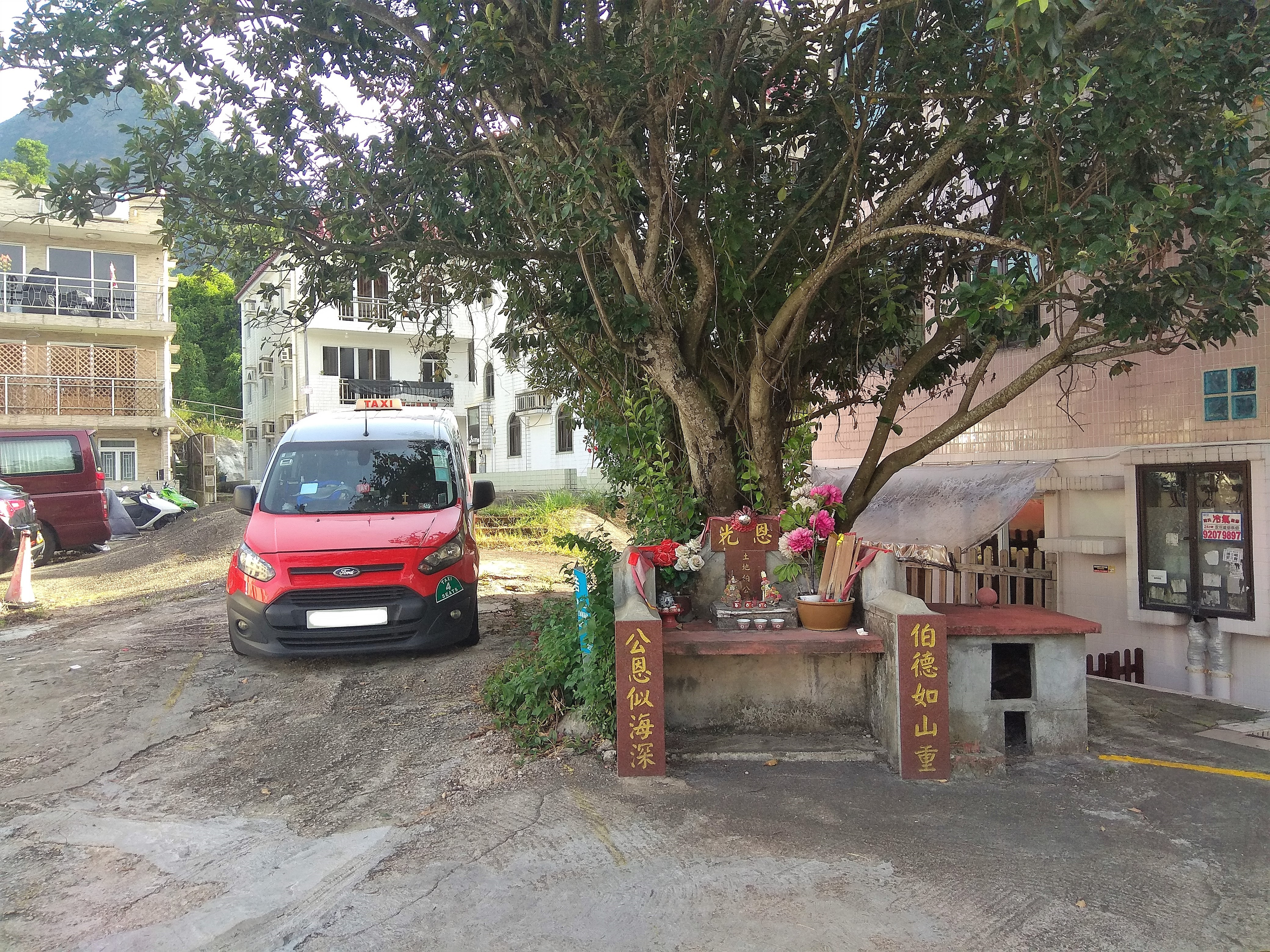
Earth God shrine in Sai O in 2020.

Sai O (Chinese: 西澳) is a village of in the Shap Sze Heung area of Sai Kung North, in Tai Po District, Hong Kong.

== Administration ==
Despite its proximity to the neighbouring areas administered by Sha Tin and Sai Kung districts, Sai O is actually administered by Tai Po District. It is covered by the Sai Kung North constituency of the Tai Po District Council, which is currently represented by Ben Tam Yi-pui. Sai O is a recognised village under the New Territories Small House Policy.

== See also ==
- Hong Kong Baptist Theological Seminary
- Nai Chung, another village of Shap Sze Heung, located directly east of Sai O
