= Tin Liu =

Tin Liu (田寮) is the name or part of the name of several places in Hong Kong, including:

- Tin Liu, Lantau (田寮), a village in the Tai Ho Wan area of northern Lantau Island, in the Islands District
- Tin Liu (Sai Kung District) (田寮), a village Sai Kung District
- Tin Liu (田寮) aka. Tai Tung Wo Liu (大洞禾寮), a village in Sai Kung North, Tai Po District
- Tin Liu (Sha Tin District) (田寮), in the vicinity of Pai Tau Village, in Sha Tin District
- Tin Liu Ha (田寮下), a village in Lam Tsuen, Tai Po District
- Tin Liu, Ma Wan (田寮), a village on Ma Wan island, in Tsuen Wan District
- Tin Liu Tsuen (田寮村), a walled village in Shap Pat Heung, Yuen Long District
