= Ko Tong Ha Yeung =

Village in Hong Kong

Coordinates: 22.435865°N 114.3306°E

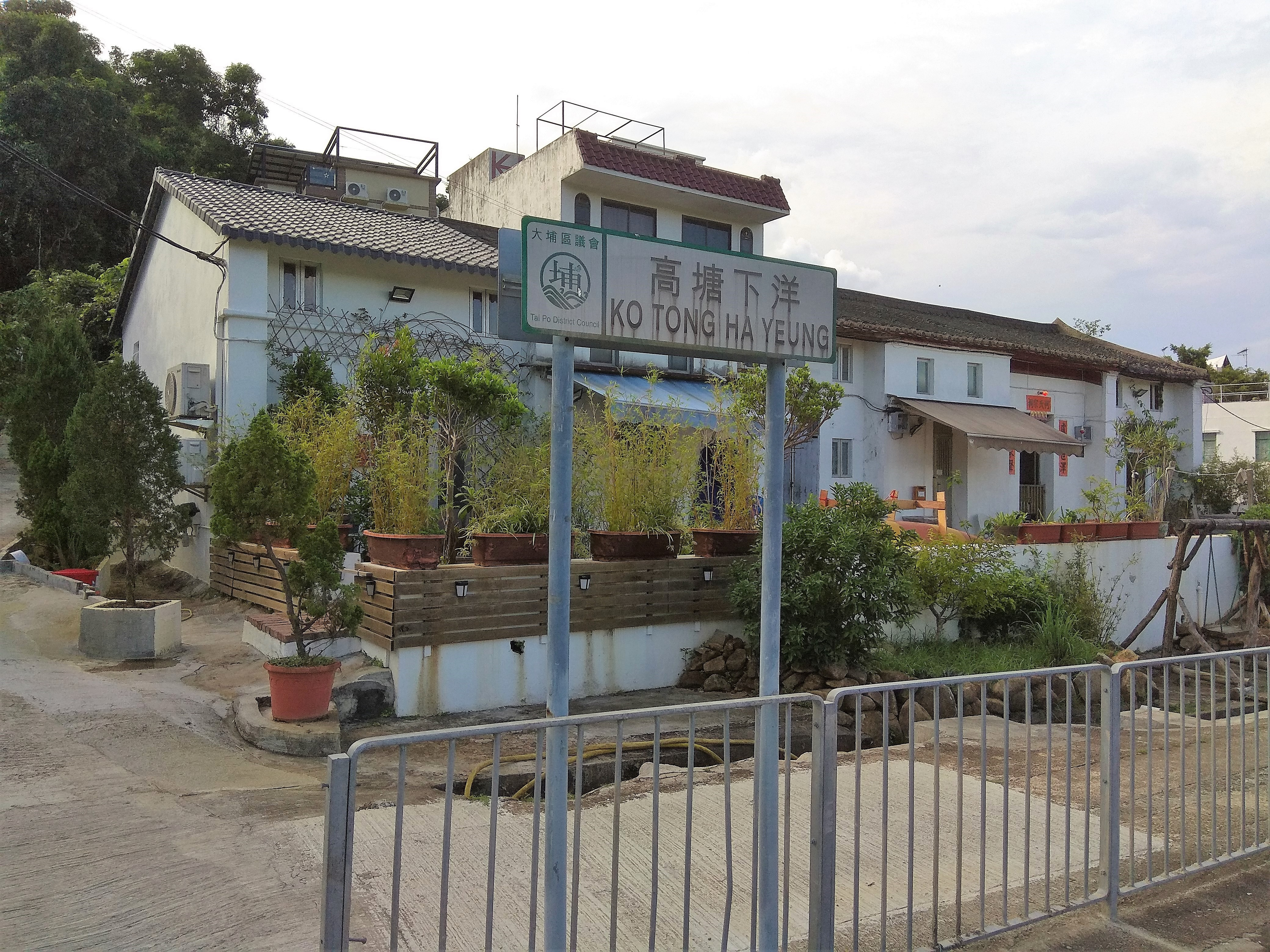
View of Ko Tong Ha Yeung along Pak Tam Road.

Ko Tong Ha Yeung (Chinese: 高塘下洋) or simply Ha Yeung (下洋) is a village of in the Sai Kung North area of Tai Po District, Hong Kong.

== Administration ==
Ha Yeung is a recognized village under the New Territories Small House Policy.

== See also ==
- Ko Tong
