= Ko Tong =

Village in Hong Kong

Coordinates: 22.431432°N 114.327045°E

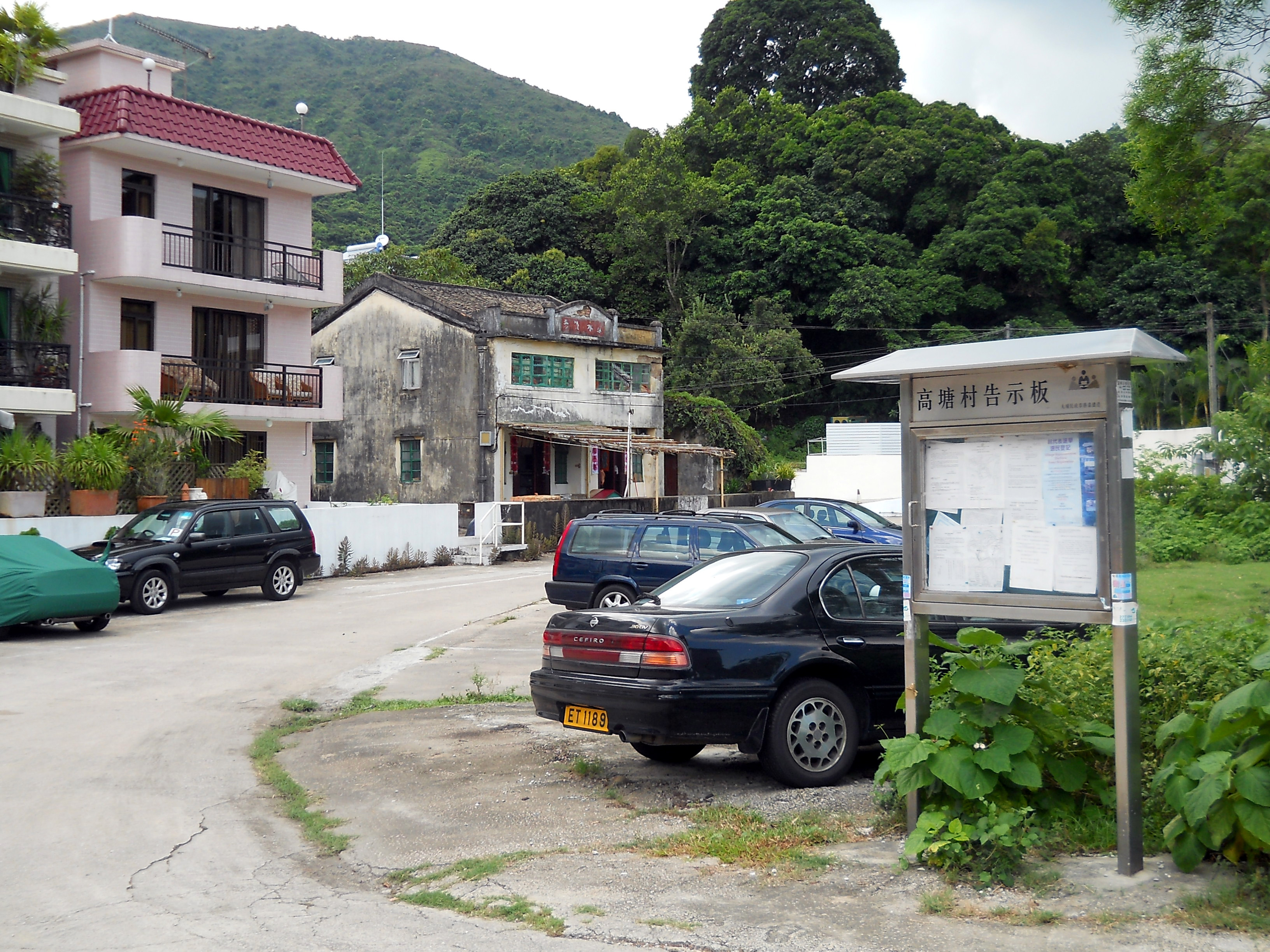
Ko Tong in August 2010

Ko Tong (Chinese: 高塘) is a village of in the Sai Kung North area of Tai Po District, Hong Kong.

== Administration ==
Ko Tong is a recognized village under the New Territories Small House Policy.

== History ==
At the time of the 1911 census, the population of Ko Tong was 80. The number of males was 34.

== See also ==
- Ko Tong Ha Yeung
