= Shap Sze Heung =

Area of Hong Kong

Coordinates: 22.4184°N 114.2615°E

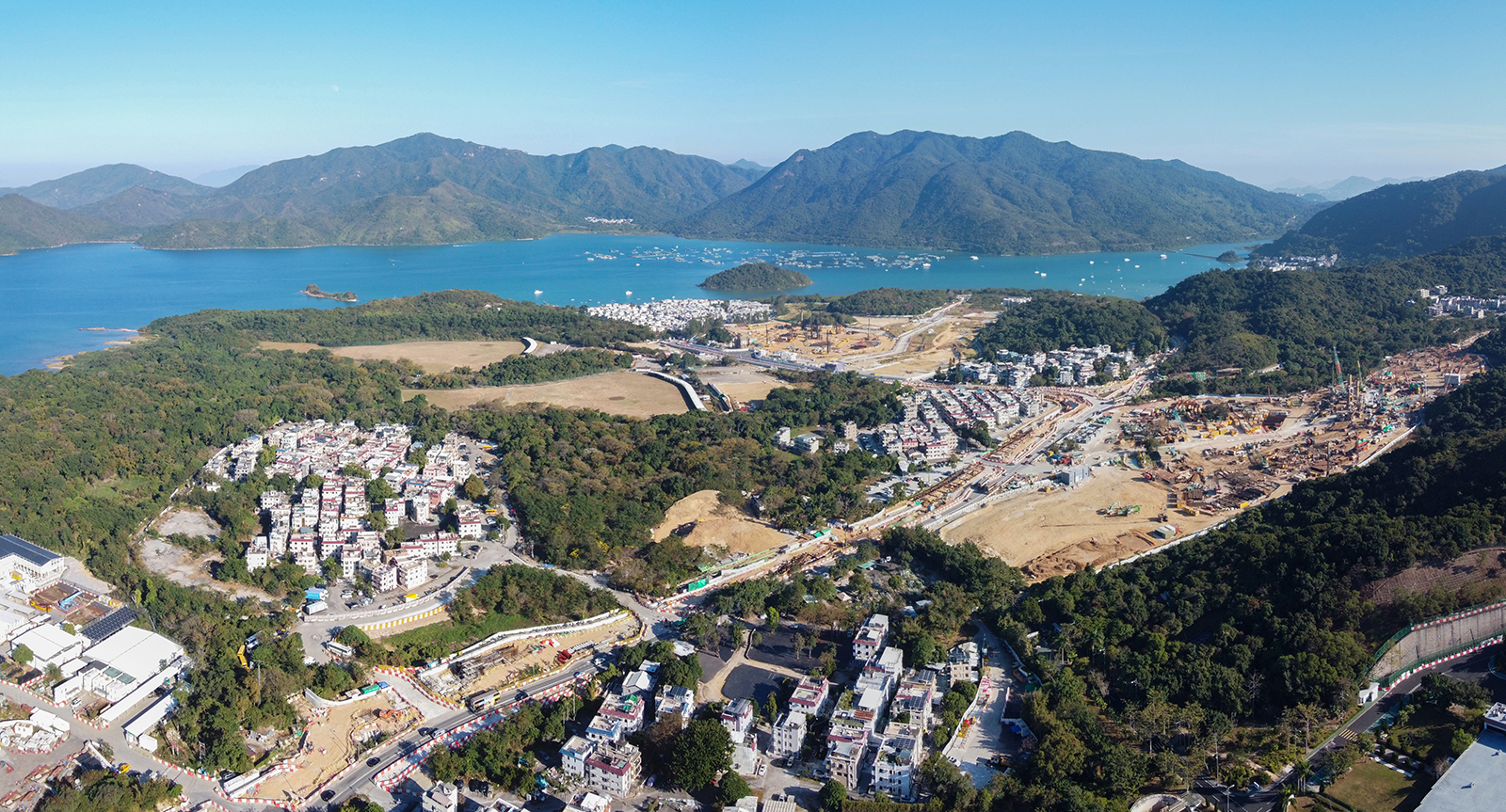
Aerial view of Shap Sze Heung, with Three Fathoms Cove in the background.

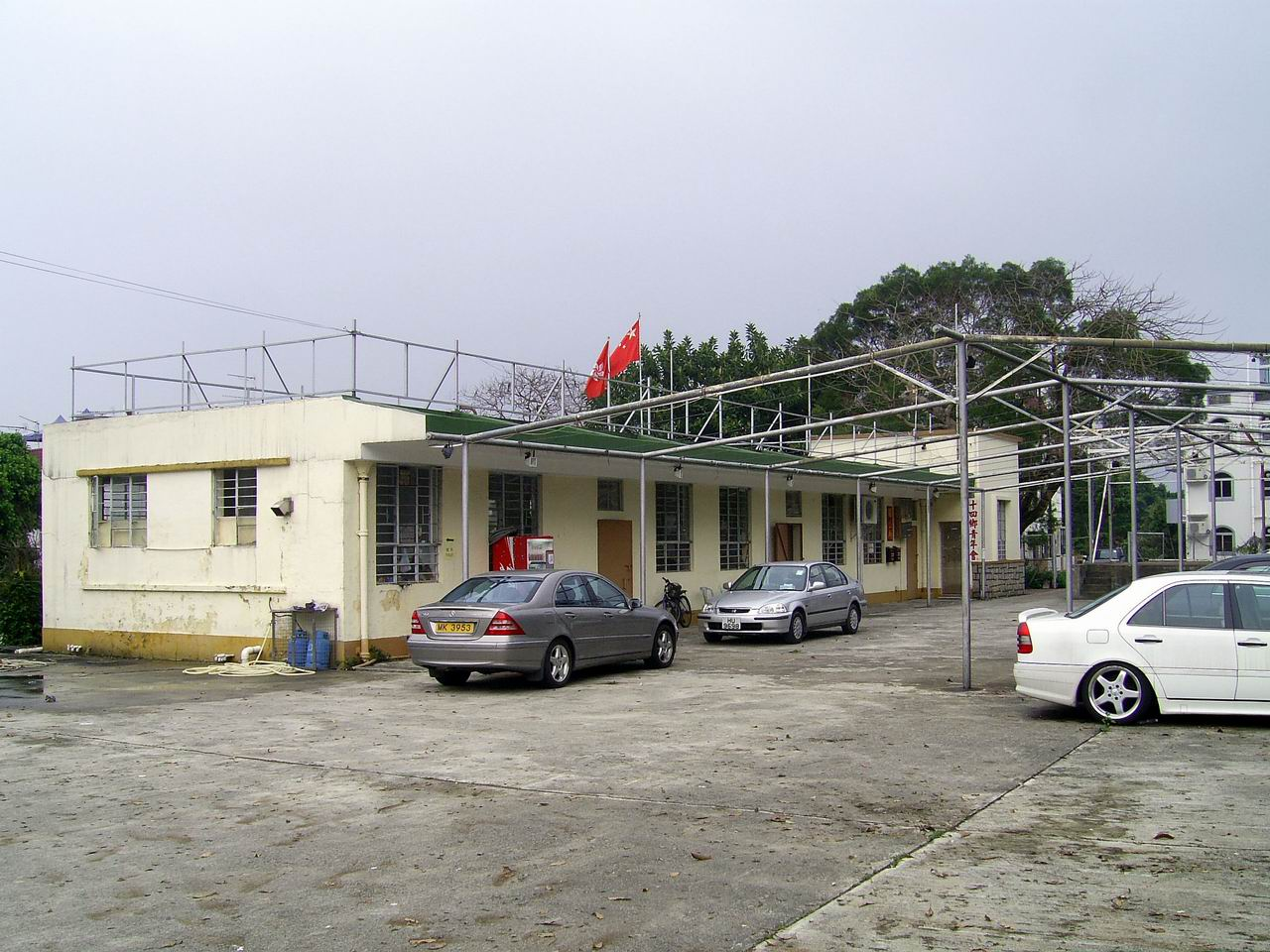
Shap Sze Heung Rural Committee Office in Kwun Hang.

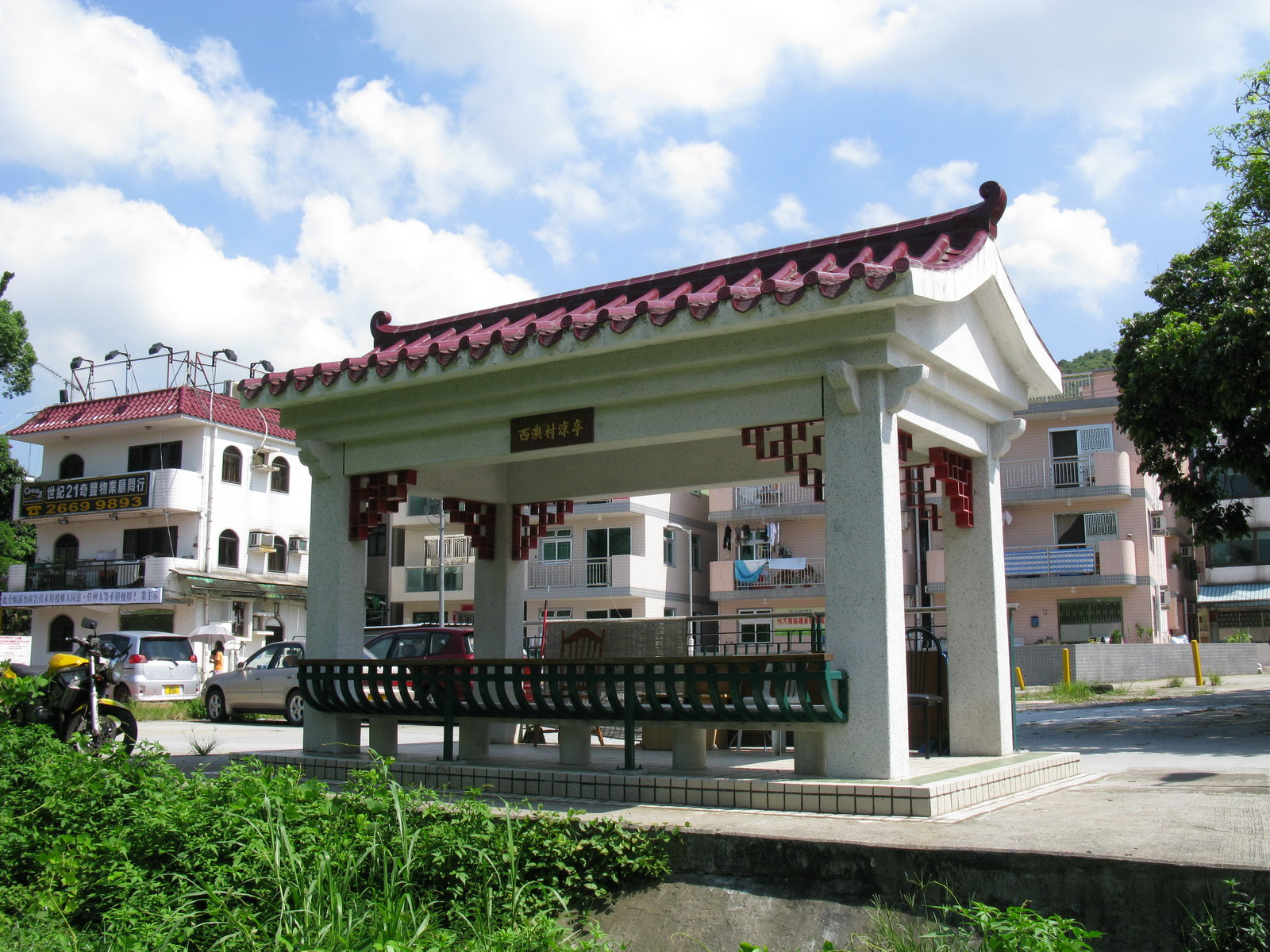
Pavilion in Sai O.

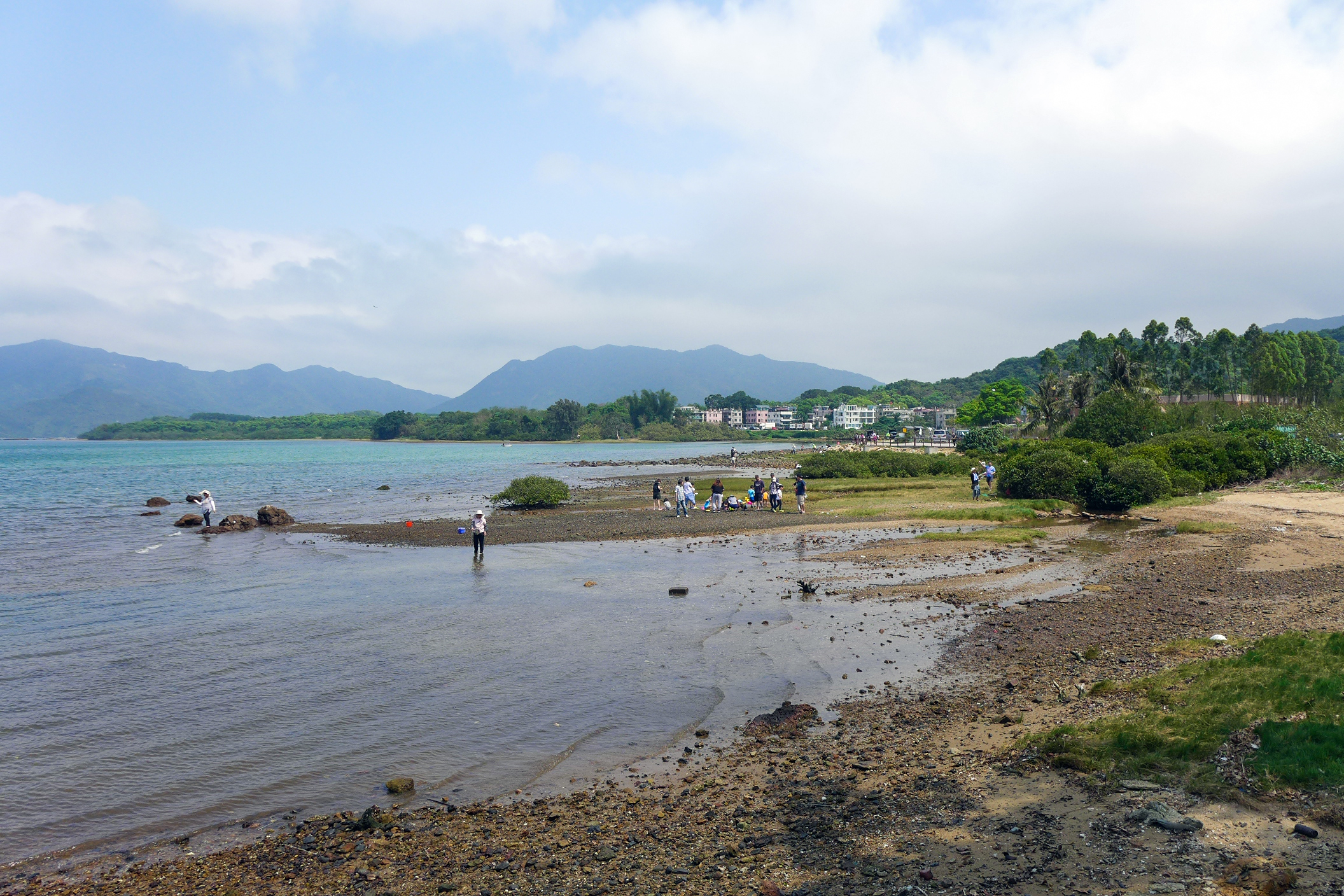
Tolo Harbour coastline in Nai Chung.

Shap Sze Heung, sometimes transliterated as Shap Sz Heung (Chinese: 十四鄉; lit. 'Fourteen Townships'), is an area in Hong Kong located in the northern part of the Sai Kung Peninsula.

== Administration ==
Despite its proximity to the neighbouring areas administered by Sha Tin and Sai Kung districts, Shap Sze Heung is actually administered by Tai Po District. It is covered by the Sai Kung North constituency of the Tai Po District Council, which is currently represented by Ben Tam Yi-pui.

== Villages ==
Shap Sze Heung consists of 14 villages:

- Kei Ling Ha Lo Wai (企嶺下老圍)
- Kei Ling Ha San Wai (企嶺下新圍)
- Sai Keng (西徑)
- Nga Yiu Tau (瓦窰頭) (鴨麻寮)
- Tin Liu (田寮) aka. Tai Tung Wo Liu (大洞禾寮)
- Tai Tung (大洞)
- Tseng Tau (井頭)
- Ma Kwu Lam (馬牯纜)
- Che Ha (輋下)
- Kwun Hang (官坑)
- Nai Chung (泥涌)
- Sai O (西澳)
- Tseung Kwan Lei (將軍里)
- Cheung Muk Tau (樟木頭)

== Education ==
Shap Sze Heung is in Primary One Admission (POA) School Net 89. Within the school net are multiple aided schools (operated independently but funded with government money); no government schools are in the net.

== See also ==
- Sai Sha Road
- Three Fathoms Cove
- Sai Kung North (constituency)
- Shap Pat Heung
