= Tai Tung =

Village in Hong Kong

Coordinates: 22.426096°N 114.263196°E

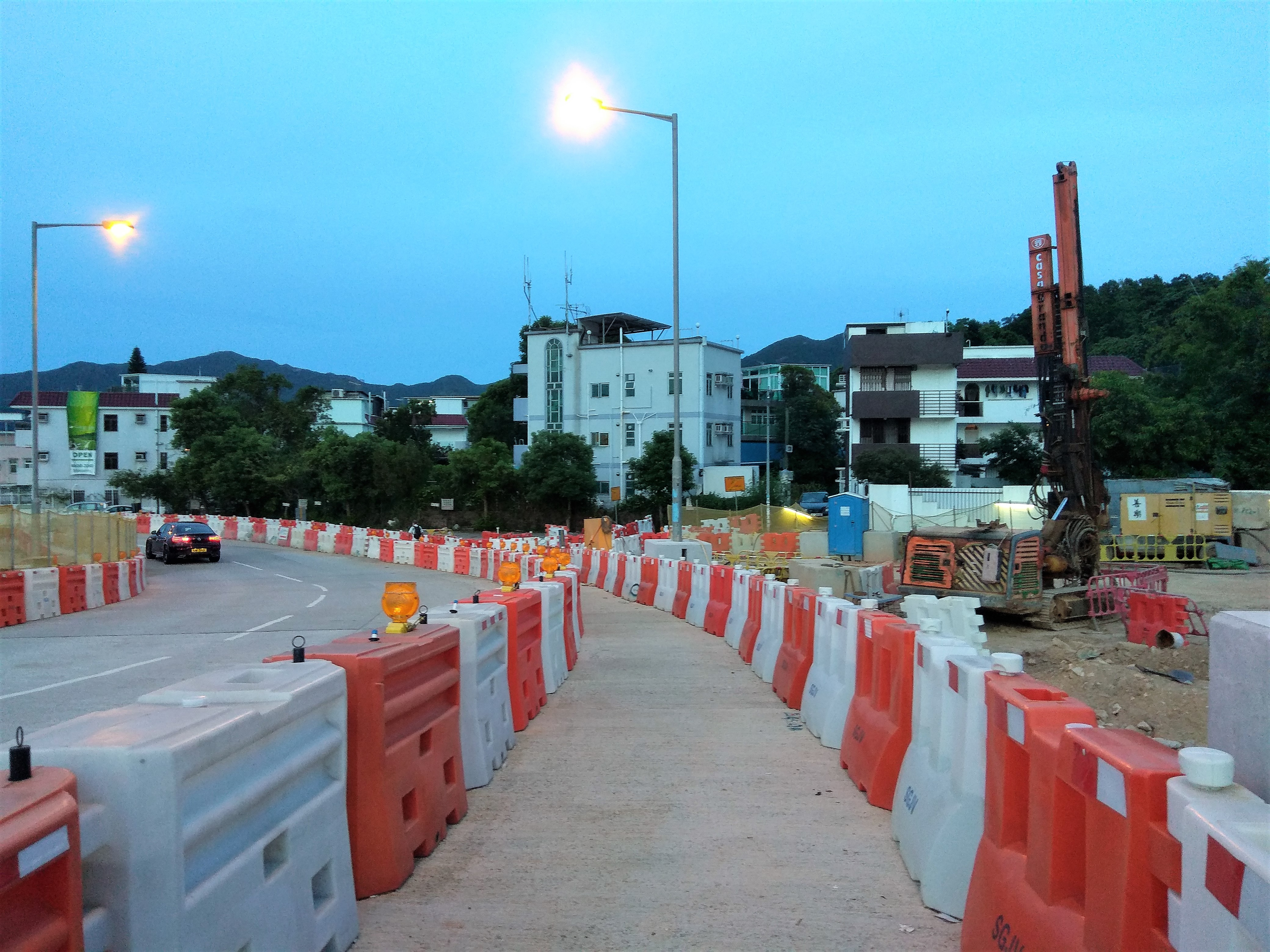
Tai Tung.

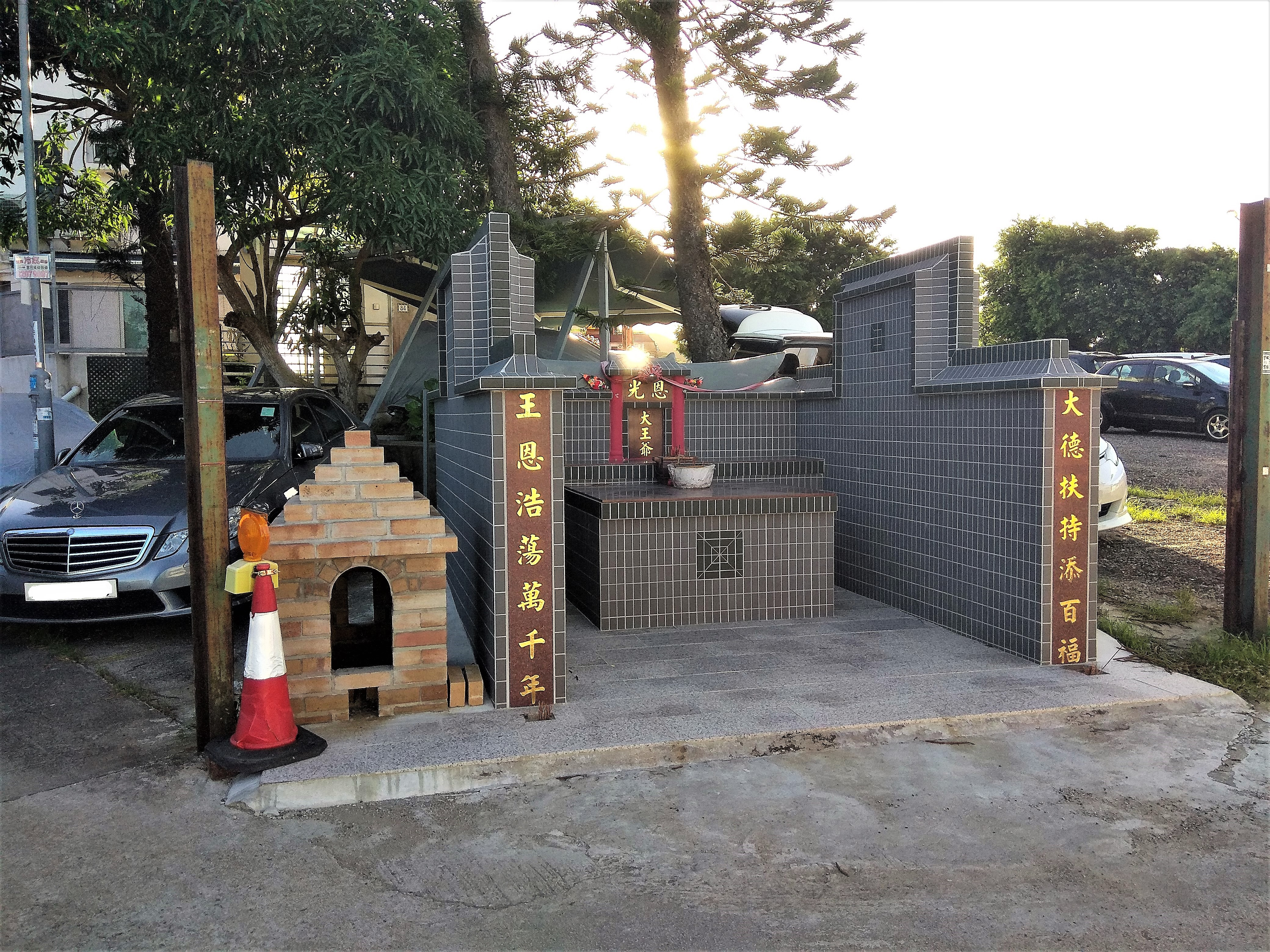
Tai Wong Yeh shrine in Tai Tung.

Tai Tung (Chinese: 大洞) is a village of in the Shap Sze Heung area of Sai Kung North, in Tai Po District, Hong Kong, located near the shore of Three Fathoms Cove.

== Administration ==
Tai Tung is a recognized village under the New Territories Small House Policy.
