= Cheung Muk Tau (Tai Po District) =

Village in Hong Kong

Coordinates: 22.42851°N 114.249537°E

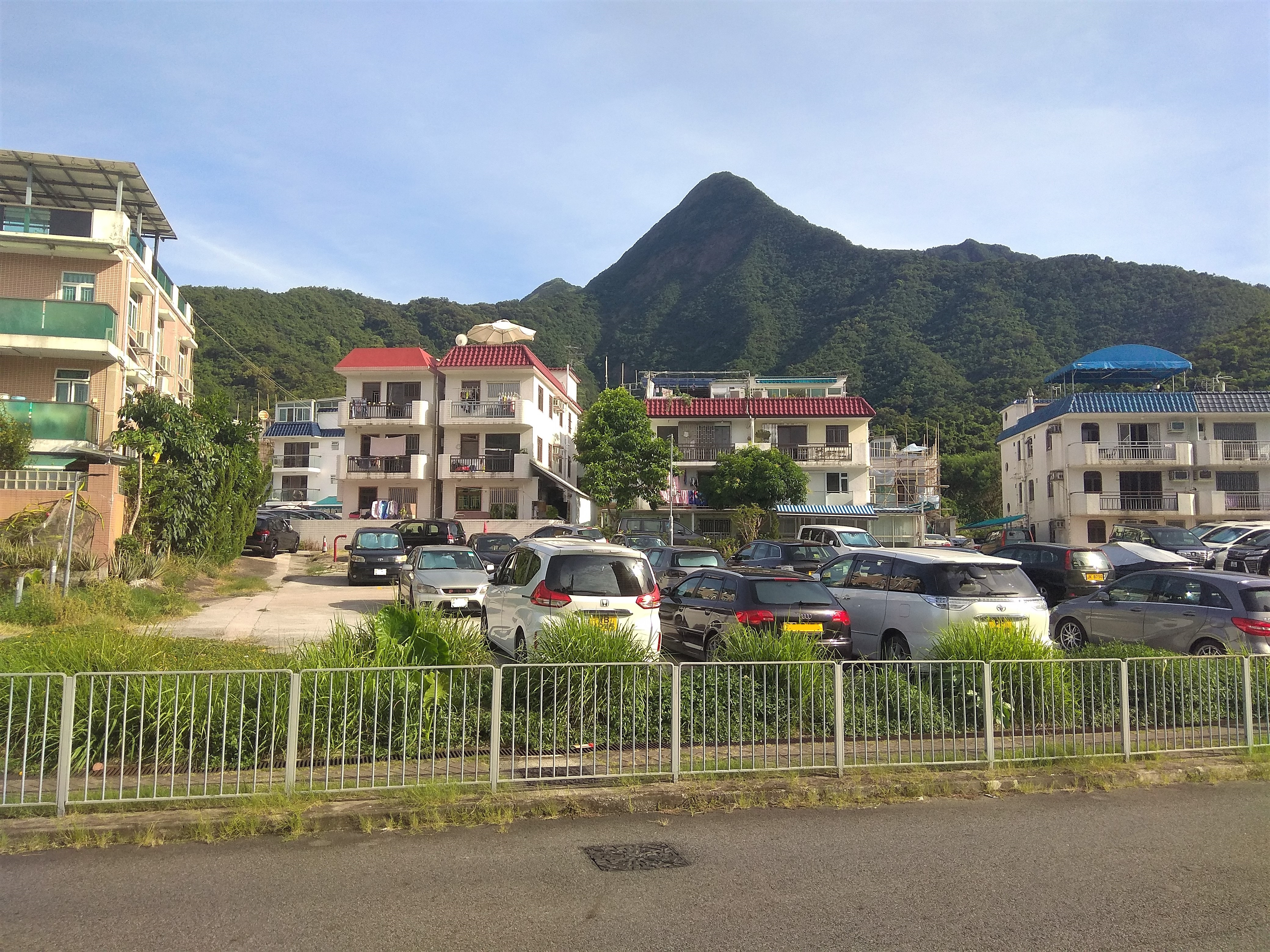
Cheung Muk Tau.

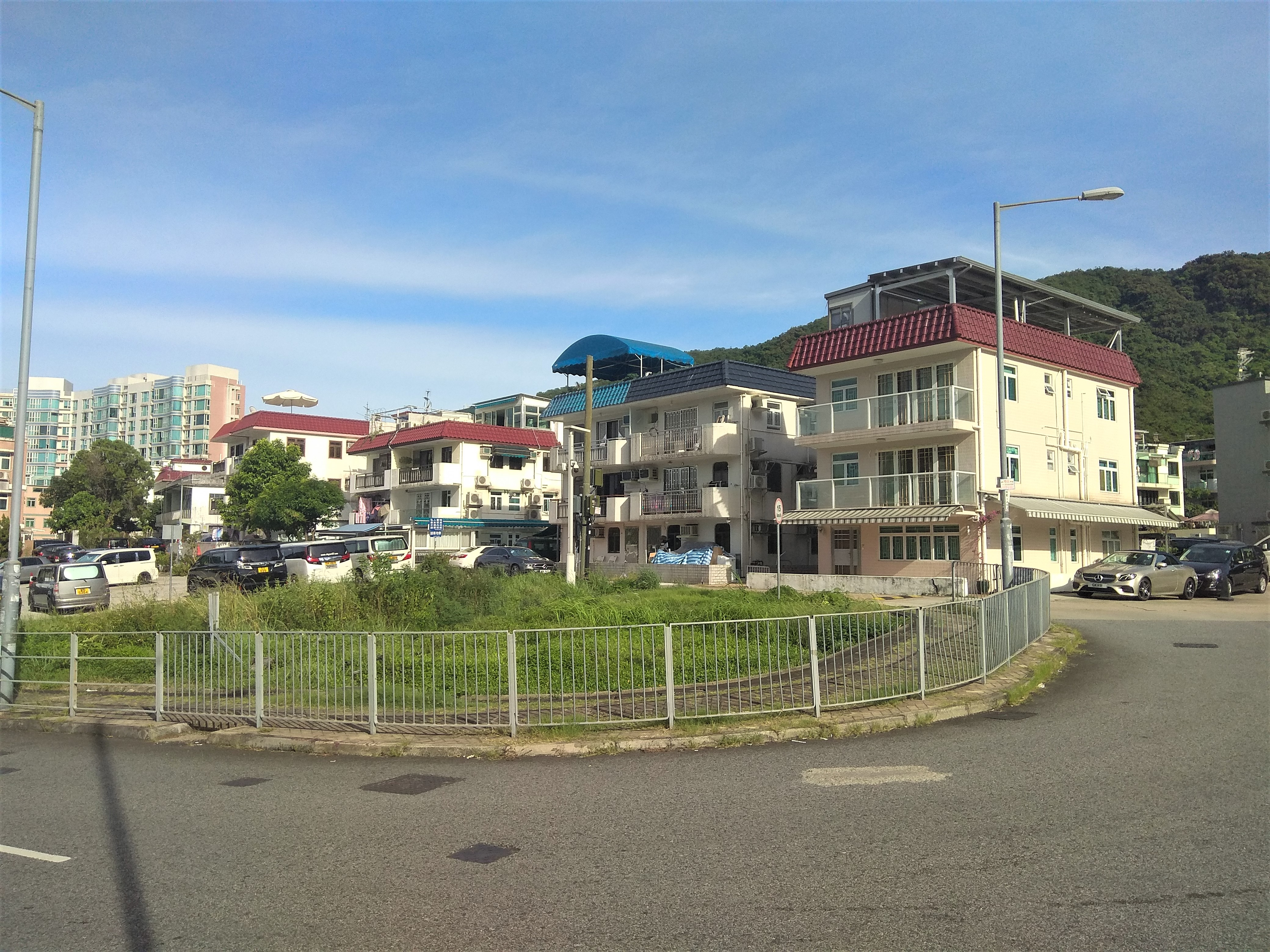
Cheung Muk Tau.

Cheung Muk Tau (Chinese: 樟木頭) is a village of in the Shap Sze Heung area of Sai Kung North, in Tai Po District, Hong Kong.

== Administration ==
Despite its proximity to the neighbouring areas administered by Sha Tin and Sai Kung districts, Cheung Muk Tau is actually administered by Tai Po District. It is covered by the Sai Kung North constituency of the Tai Po District Council, which is currently represented by Ben Tam Yi-pui. Cheung Muk Tau is a recognized village under the New Territories Small House Policy.
