= Sai Keng =

Sai Keng 西徑
- Village
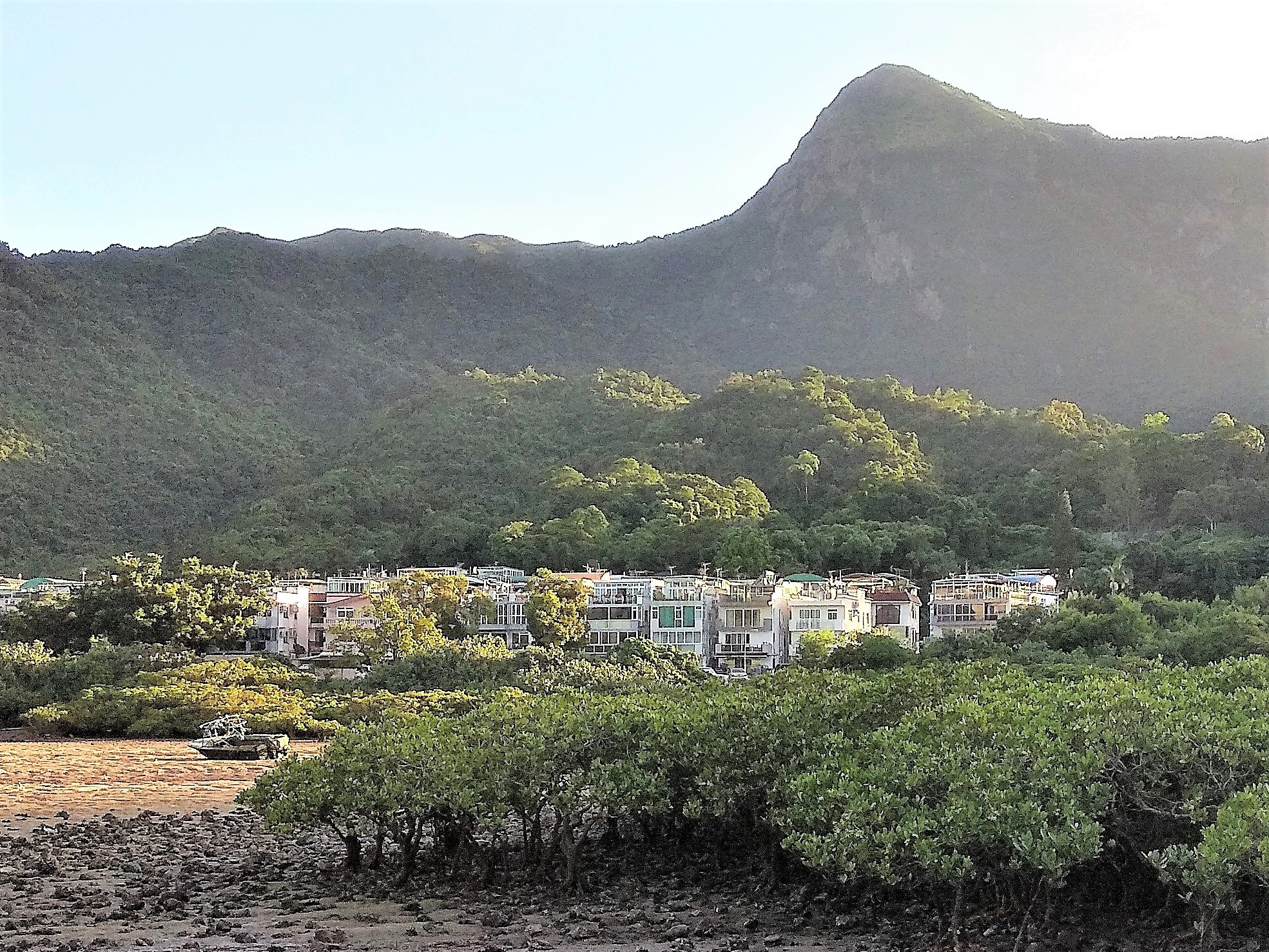
- Sai Keng

- Location in Hong Kong
- Coordinates: 22.418613°N 114.267270°E
- Country: China
- SAR: Hong Kong
- District: Tai Po District
- Time zone: UTC+8 (Hong Kong Time)

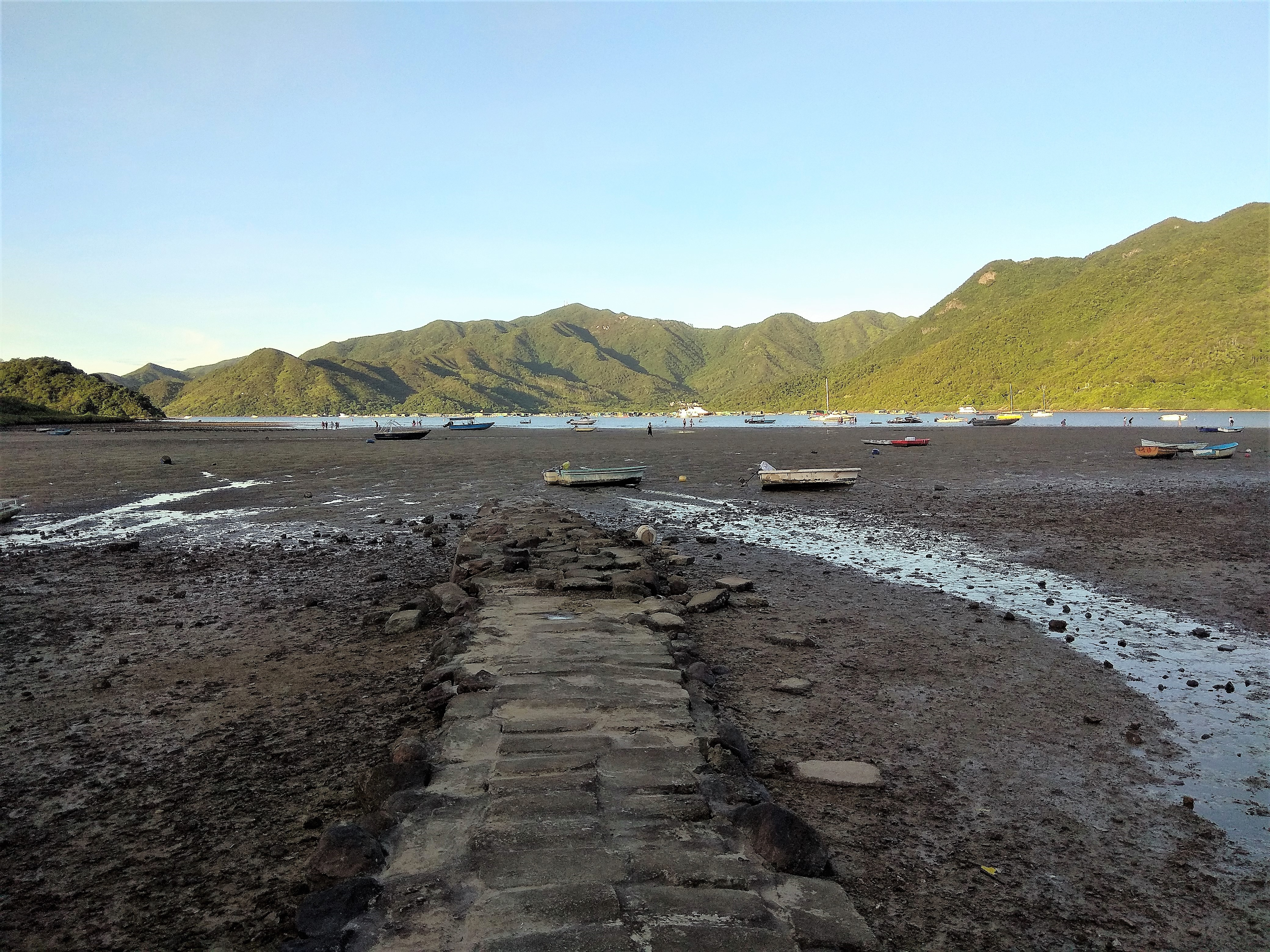
Seashore of Three Fathoms Cove at Sai Keng.

Sai Keng (Chinese: 西徑) is a village of in the Shap Sze Heung area of Sai Kung North, in Tai Po District, Hong Kong, located near the shore of Three Fathoms Cove.

== Administration ==
Sai Keng is a recognized village under the New Territories Small House Policy.
