= Cheung Muk Tau =

Cheung Muk Tau may refer to:

- Cheung Muk Tau (Islands District), an island of Hong Kong, part of the Soko Islands group
- Cheung Muk Tau (Tai Po District), a village in Shap Sze Heung, Tai Po District, Hong Kong
- Zhangmutou, a Town in Dongguan, Guangdong province, China
