= Kwun Hang =

Coordinates: 22.428468°N 114.259759°E

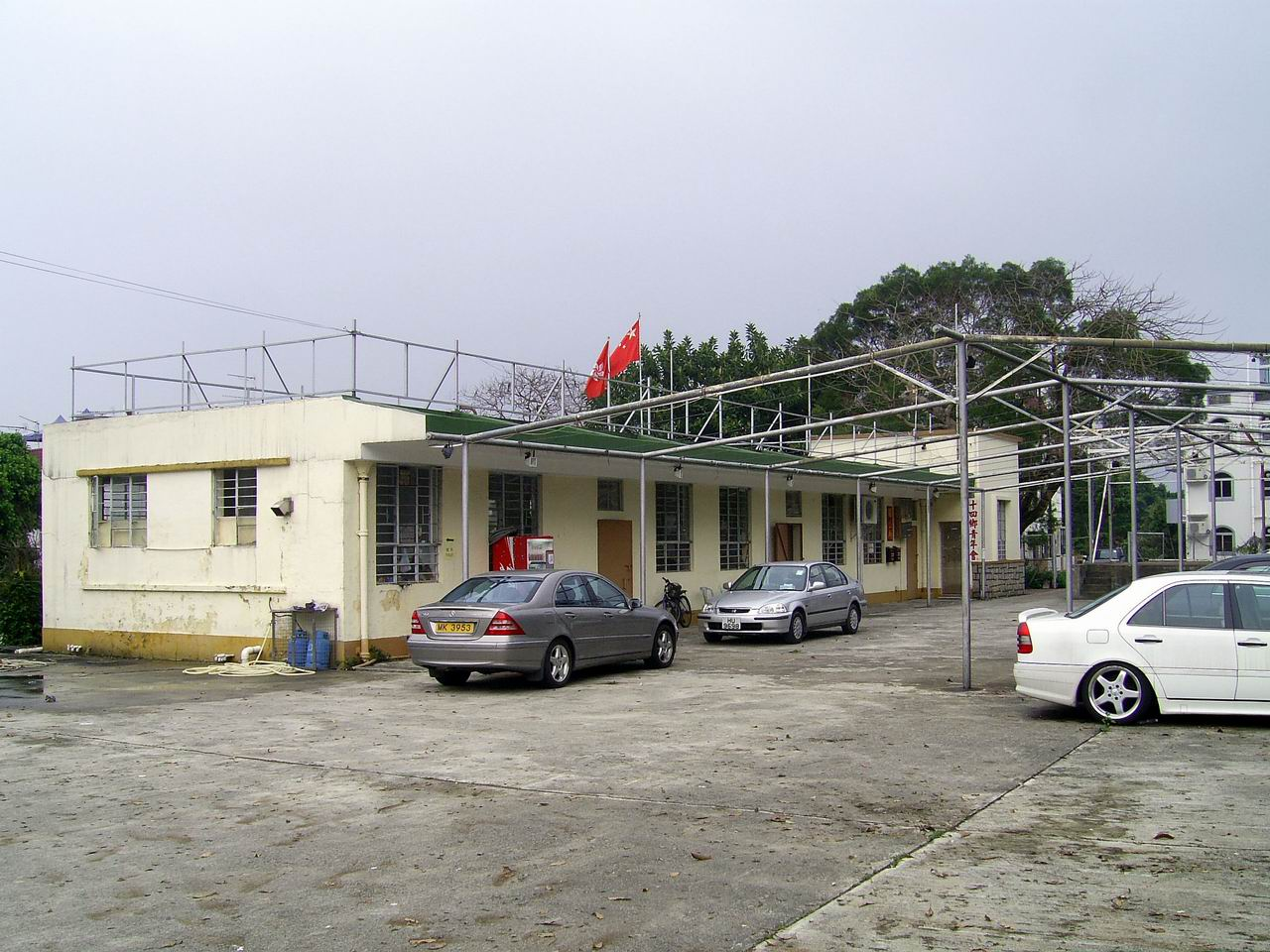
Shap Sze Heung Rural Committee Office in Kwung Hang.

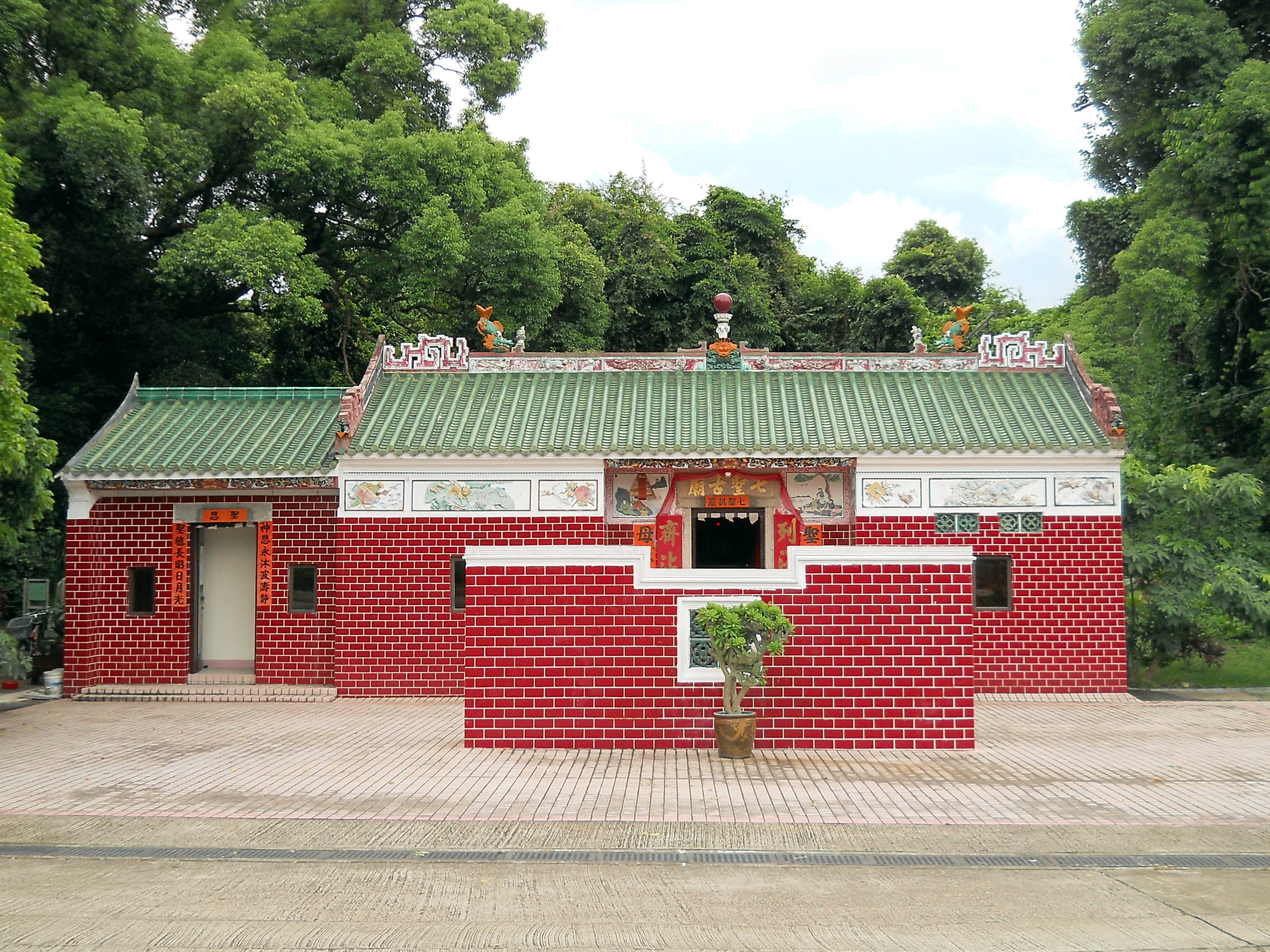
Chat Shing Temple (七聖古廟) in Kwung Hang.

Kwun Hang (Chinese: 官坑) is a village of in the Shap Sze Heung area of Sai Kung North, in Tai Po District, Hong Kong.

== Administration ==
Kwun Hang is a recognized village under the New Territories Small House Policy.

== Chat Shing Temple ==
The Chat Shing Temple (七聖古廟) in Kwung Hang was built in 1762 for the worship of the Seven Fairies (七姐) and the Mother of Heaven (王母).
