= Che Ha =

Village in Hong Kong

Coordinates: 22.430234°N 114.262279°E

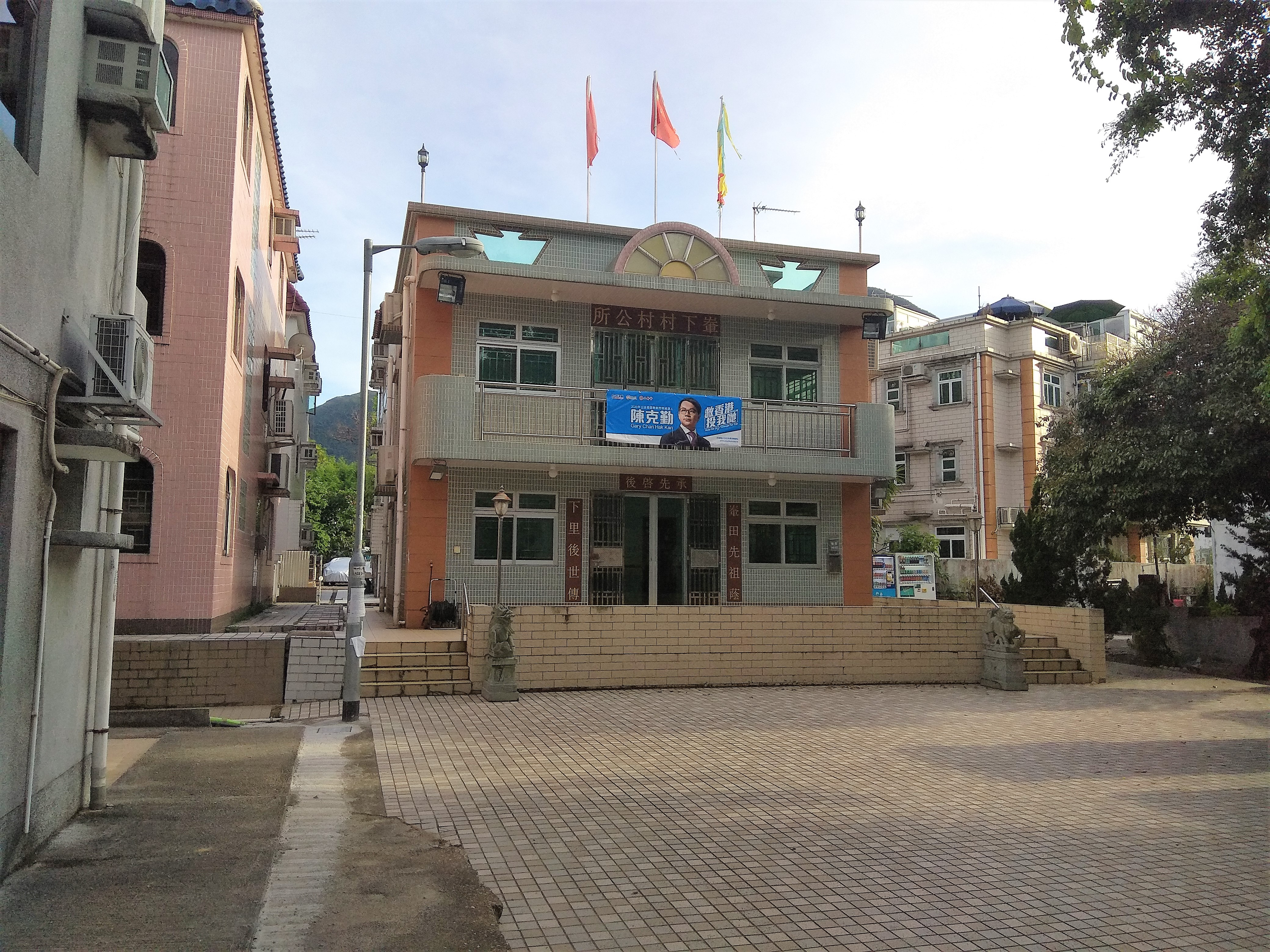
Che Ha village office.

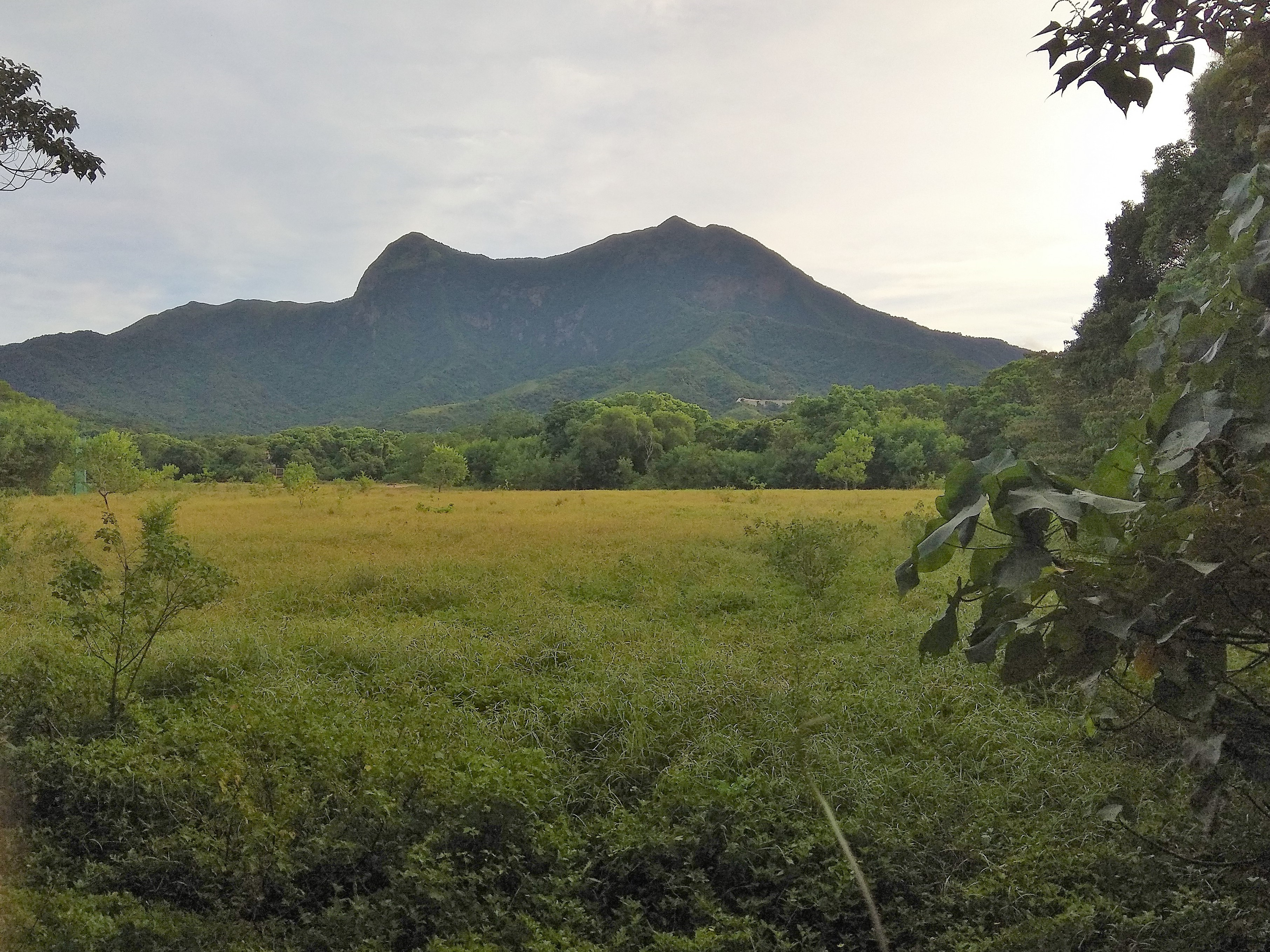
Ma On Shan viewed from the vicinity of Che Ha.

Che Ha (Chinese: 輋下) is a village of in the Shap Sze Heung area of Sai Kung North, in Tai Po District, Hong Kong.

== Administration ==
Che Ha is a recognized village under the New Territories Small House Policy.

== History ==
At the time of the 1911 census, the population of Sheung Yeung was 73. The number of males was 33.
