= Shui Long Wo =

Area of Hong Kong

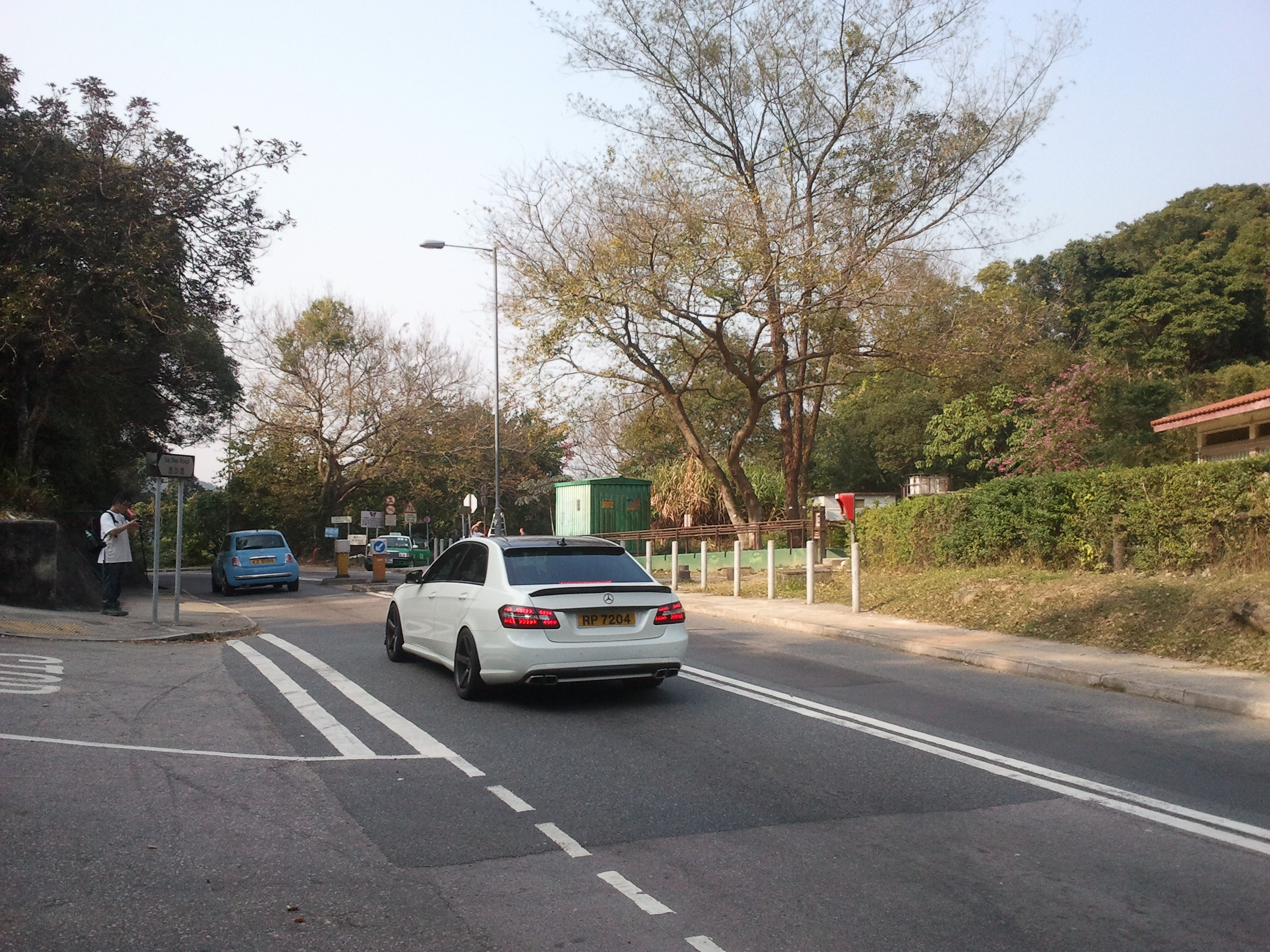
Sai Sha Road at Shui Long Wo.

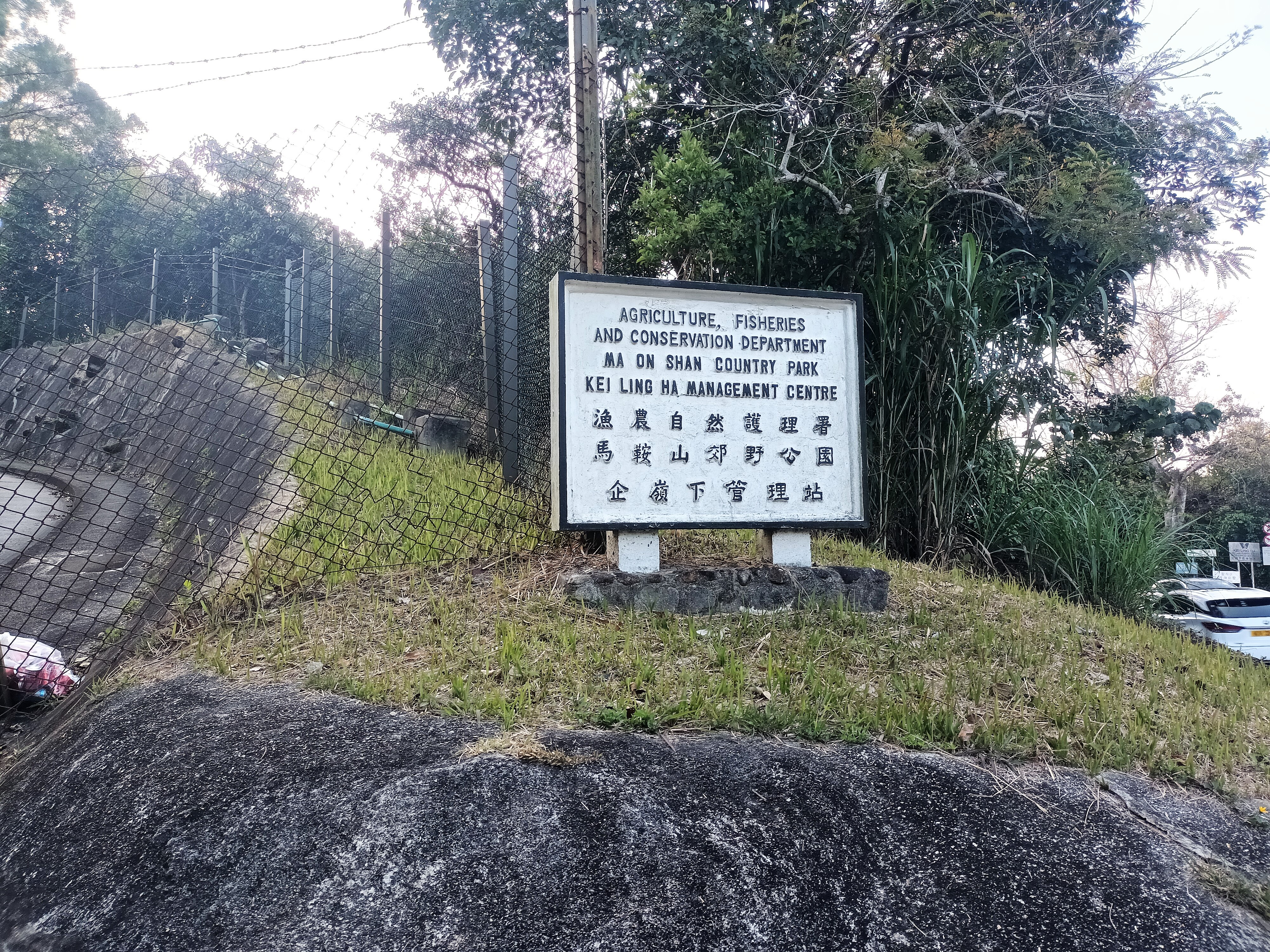
Ma On Shan Country Park Kei Ling Ha Management Centre at Shui Long Wo.

Shui Long Wo (Chinese: 水浪窩) is an area of Hong Kong, part of Kei Ling Ha, in the eastern New Territories of Hong Kong. Administratively, it is part of Tai Po District. The end of Stage 3 and start of Stage 4 of the MacLehose Trail is located at Shui Long Wo.

== Features ==
A barbecue area and a campsite are located at Shui Long Wo.

The Shui Long Wo Star Lookout (水浪窩 觀星台), a 6-metre-high stone structure, is a replica of the Gaocheng Astronomical Observatory.

== See also ==
- List of gaps in Hong Kong
