= Tin Liu (Sai Kung District) =

Village in Hong Kong

Coordinates: 22.35787°N 114.23823°E

Tin Liu (Chinese: 田寮) is a village in Sai Kung District, Hong Kong.

== Administration ==
Tin Liu, together with Tai No Sheung Yeung, is a recognized village under the New Territories Small House Policy.

== History ==
In 1955, Austin Coates reported that Tin Liu had a population of 30, surnamed Tsang (曾). He described the village as a subsidiary of Tai No, and that it was at a 45 minute walking distance from it, being located between Kai Ham and its subsidiary Wang Che.
