= Kai Ham =

Village in Hong Kong

Coordinates: 22.35886°N 114.236592°E

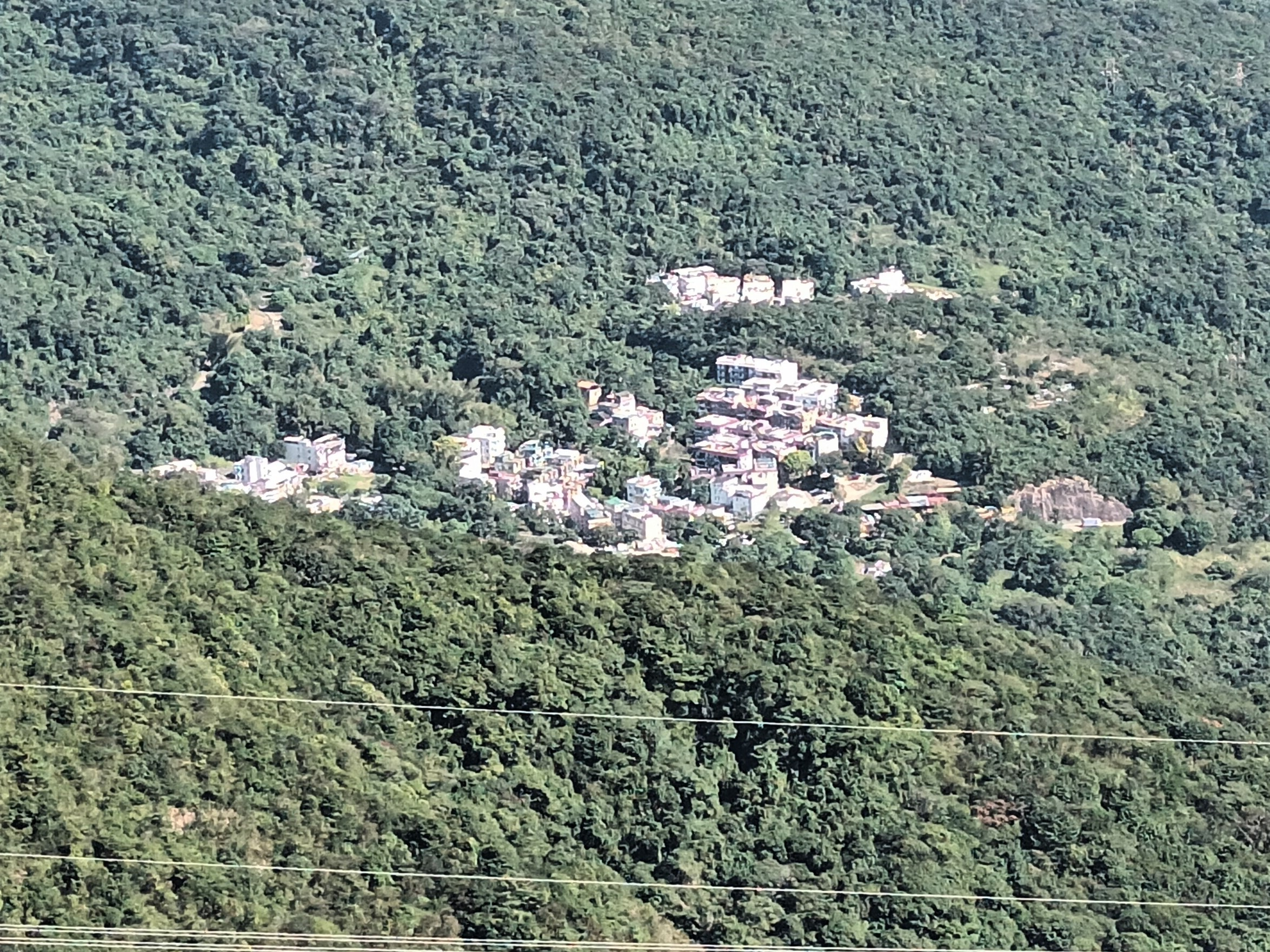
Kai Ham and Wang Che viewed from Cheung Shan.

Kai Ham (Chinese: 界咸) is a village in Sai Kung District, Hong Kong.

== Administration ==
Kai Ham, including Wang Che (橫輋), is a recognized village under the New Territories Small House Policy.

== History ==
At the time of the 1911 census, the population of Wang Che was 5, including 4 males.

== See also ==
- Tin Liu (Sai Kung District)
