= Tai Tung Wo Liu =

Village in Hong Kong

Coordinates: 22.420397°N 114.262497°E

Tai Tung Wo Liu (Chinese: 大洞禾寮) or Tin Liu (田寮) is a village of in the Shap Sze Heung area of Sai Kung North, in Tai Po District, Hong Kong.

== Administration ==
Tai Tung Wo Liu is a recognized village under the New Territories Small House Policy.
