= Kei Ling Ha =

Area in Hong Kong's New Territories

Kei Ling Ha Chinese: 企嶺下
- Area
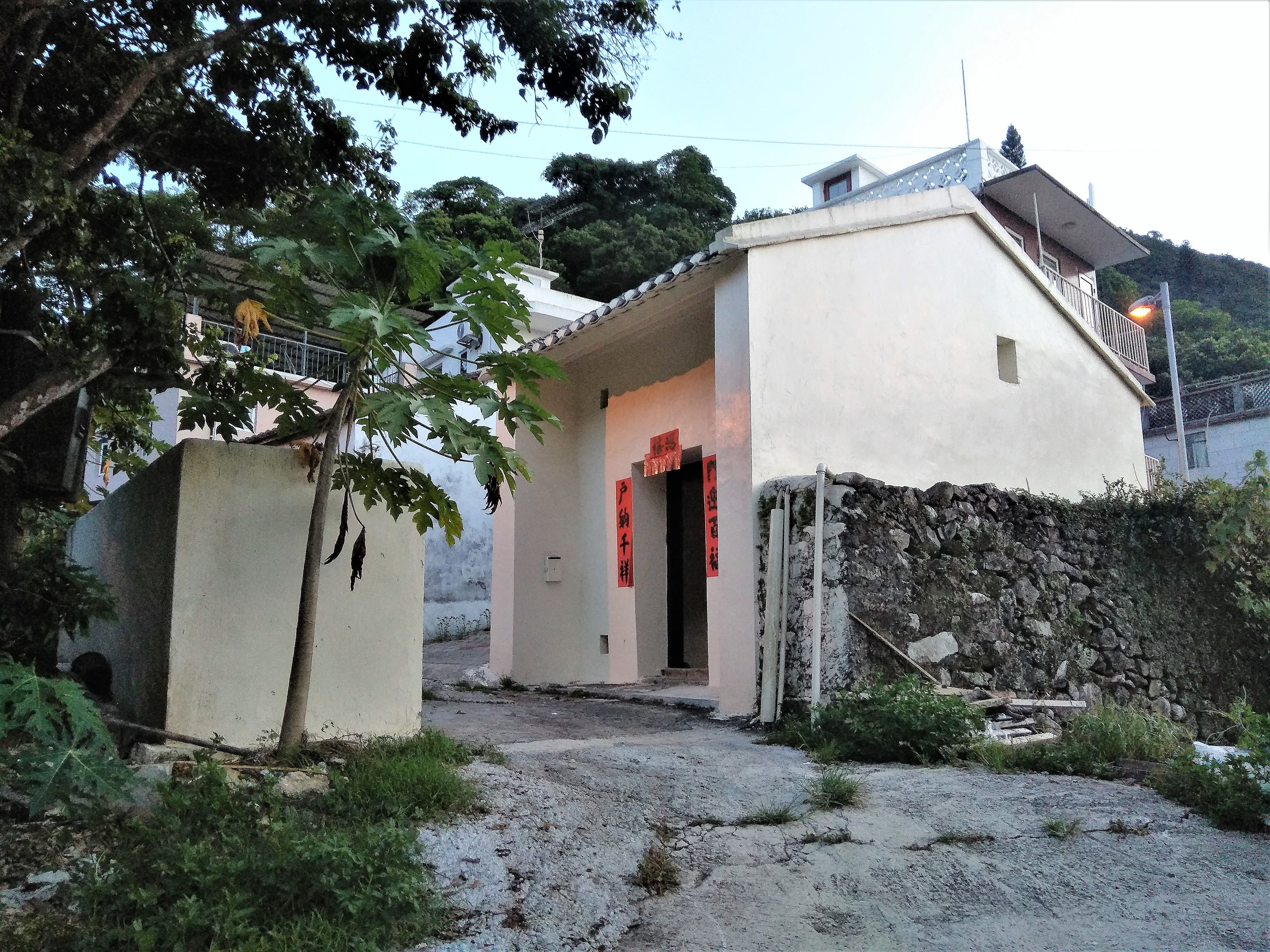
- Entrance gate of Kei Ling Ha Lo Wai

- Location within Hong Kong
- Coordinates: 22.413488°N 114.272404°E
- Country: People's Republic of China
- Special administrative region: Hong Kong
- Region: New Territories
- Area: Shap Sze Heung
- Time zone: UTC+8:00 (HKT)

Kei Ling Ha (Chinese: 企嶺下) is an area of Shap Sze Heung, on the Sai Kung Peninsula, in eastern New Territories of Hong Kong. Administratively, it is part of Tai Po District. It is a popular place for countryside visits, picnicking and bird watching.

== Location ==
Kei Ling Ha is located at the coastal area near Sai Sha Road, at the junction of Ma On Shan Country Park and Sai Kung West Country Park. It is located in the innermost shore of Three Fathoms Cove which is known as Kei Ling Ha Hoi indigenously.

== Villages ==
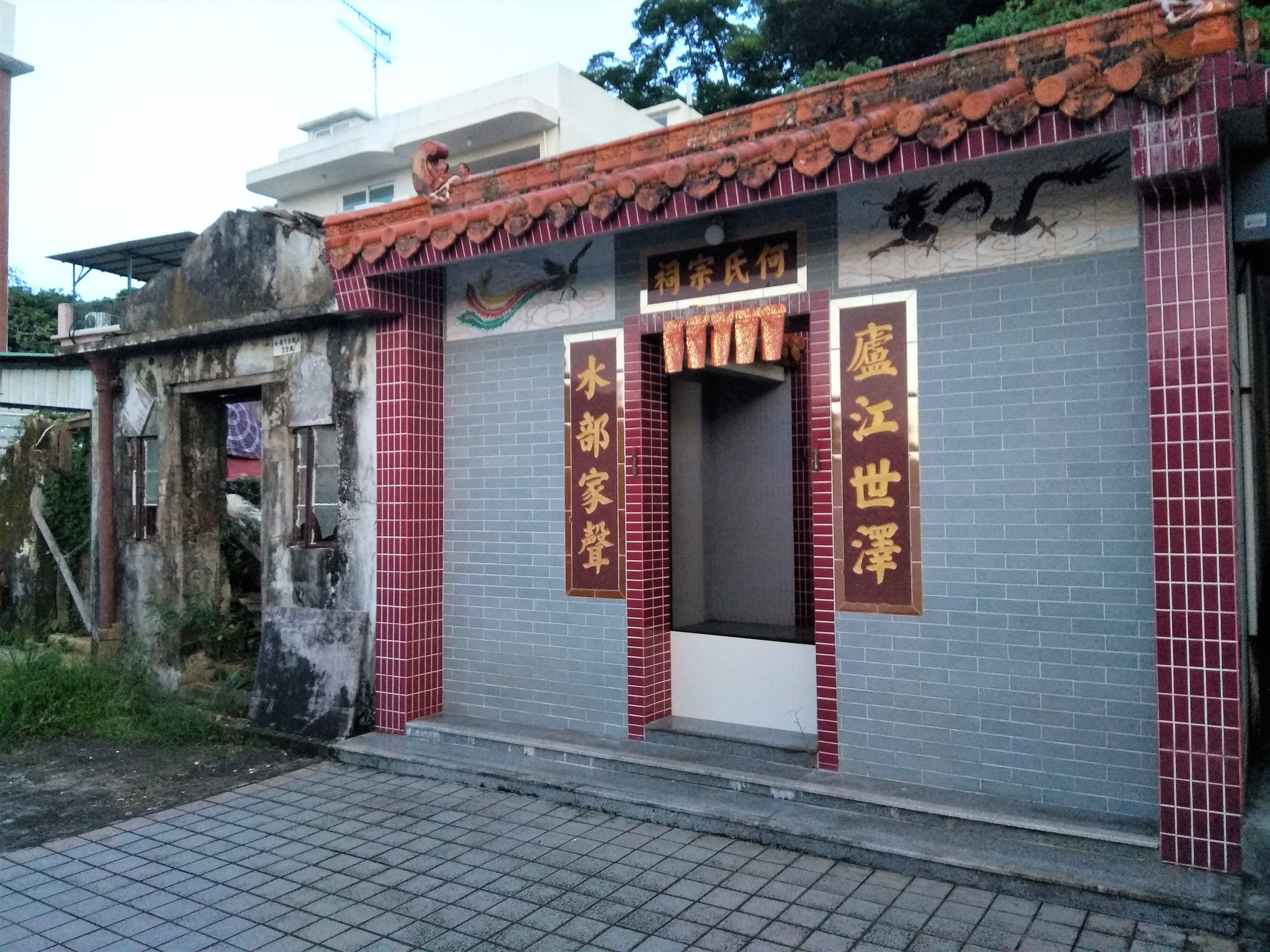
Ho Ancestral Hall in Kei Ling Ha Lo Wai.

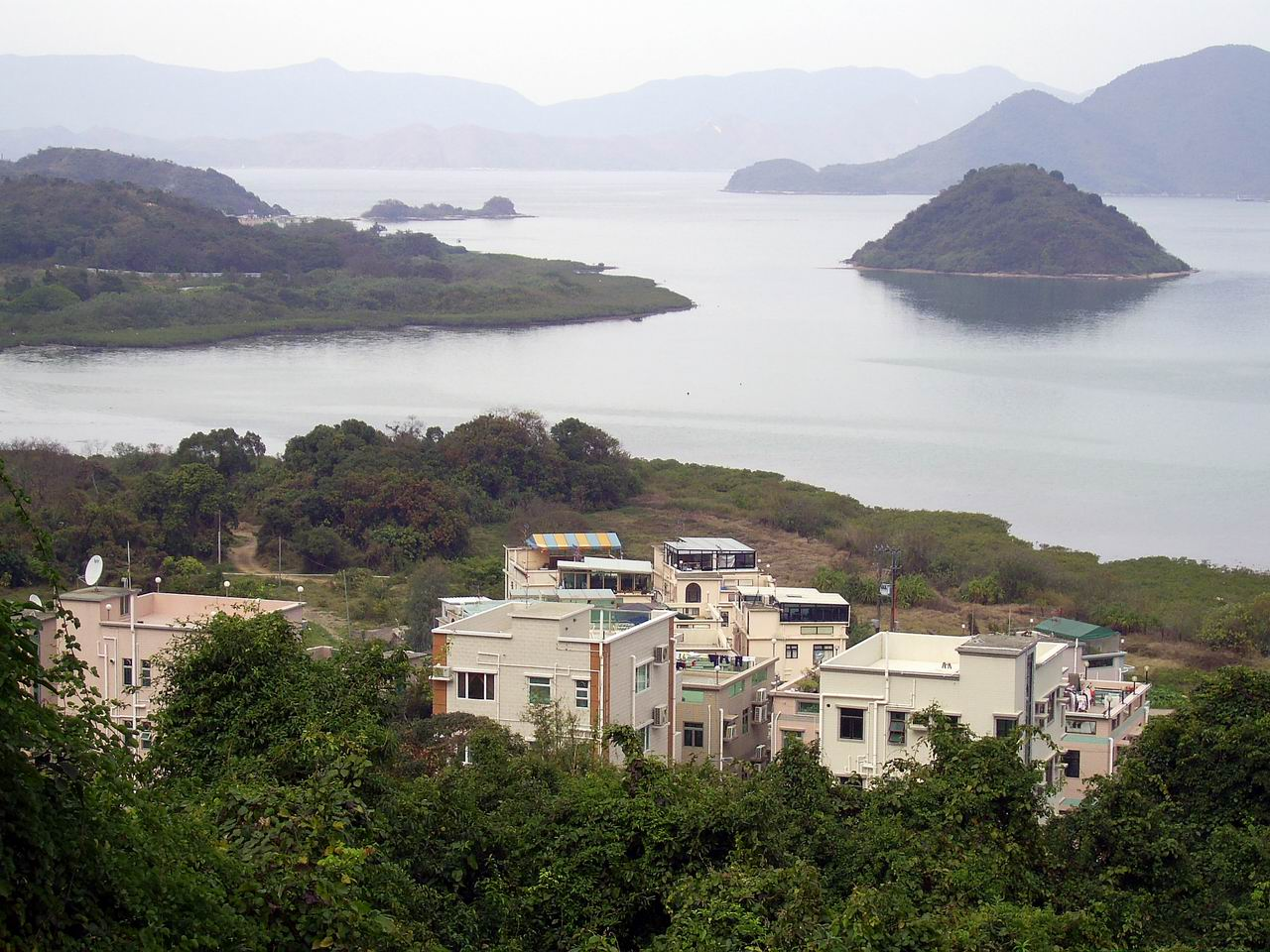
View of Three Fathoms Cove. The buildings in the foreground are part of Kei Ling Ha San Wai. The island on the right is Wu Chau.

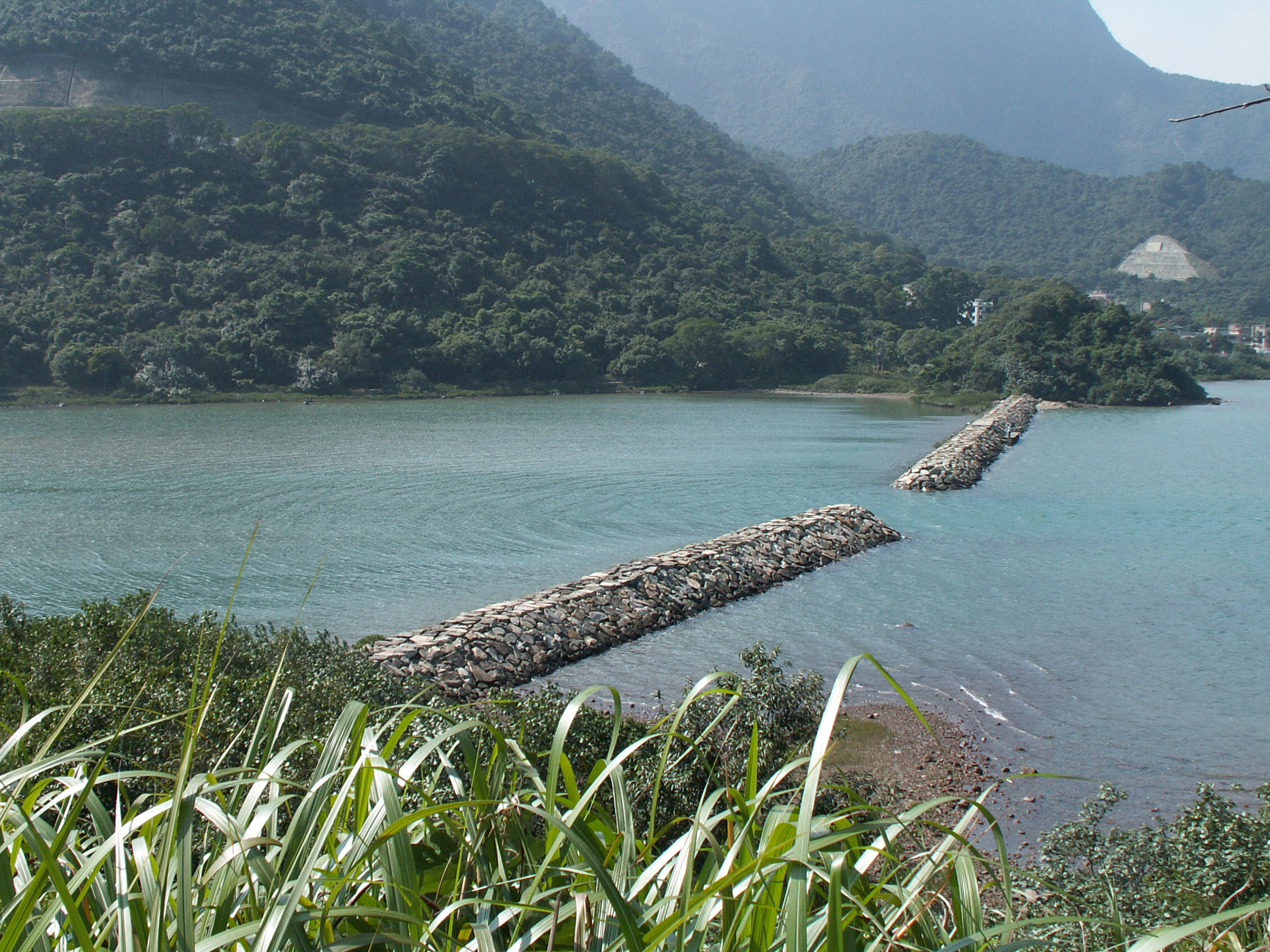
Three Fathoms Cove near Kei Ling Ha.

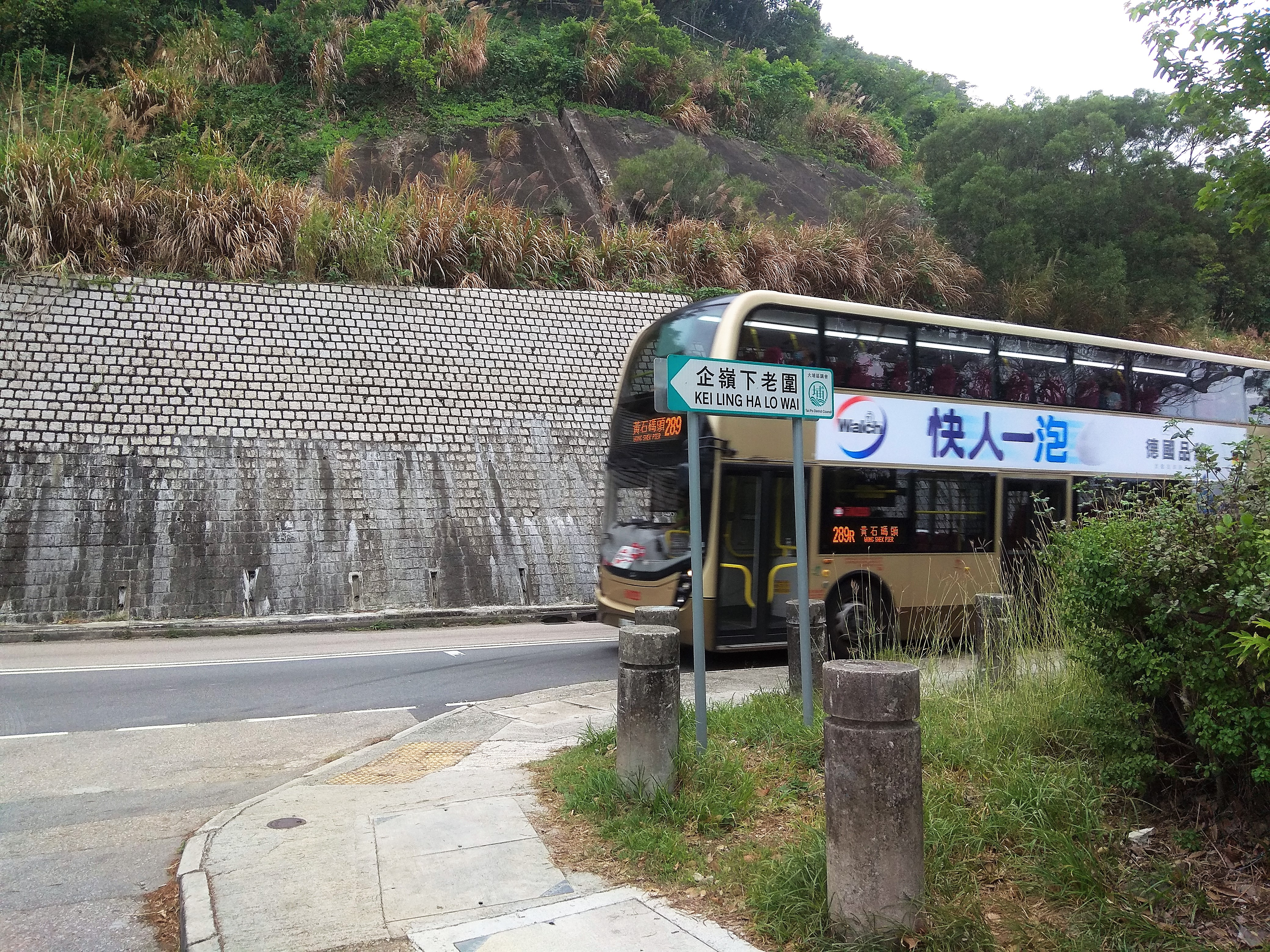
Sai Sha Road at Kei Ling Ha Lo Wai.

Kei Ling Ha Lo Wai (企嶺下老圍; 'old wai') and Kei Ling Ha San Wai (企嶺下新圍; 'new wai') are the two main villages within this area. Kei Ling Ha Lo Wai is a Hakka walled village. Both villages are occupied by members of the Ho (何) lineage.

The settlement of Kei Ling Ha Lo Wai probably dates back to the late 16th century. The New Village branched off from the "old Wai" around 1876. The combined population of the two villages was 135 in 1960.

As a walled village, Kei Ling Ha Lo Wai features an entrance gate and a Ho Ancestral Hall. A drystone wall marks the outer edge of the village platform on a piedmont site. The site faces almost directly north so that the wall has a most likely a geomantic as well as a practical function.

Kei Ling Ha Lo Wai and Kei Ling Ha San Wai are recognized villages under the New Territories Small House Policy.

== Ecology ==
Kei Ling Ha is the site of a rocky shore. Mangrove can be found at Kei Ling Ha Lo Wai, and the site has been a Site of Special Scientific Interest since 1994. It is the habitat of fiddler crabs.

== Transport ==
Kei Ling Ha is served by Sai Sha Road. The end of Stage 3 and start of Stage 4 of the MacLehose Trail is located at Shui Long Wo (水浪窩), part of Kei Ling Ha.

== See also ==
- Environment of Hong Kong
- List of places in Hong Kong
- Walled villages of Hong Kong
- List of villages in Hong Kong
