= Tai No =

Village in Hong Kong

Coordinates: 22.364876°N 114.234458°E

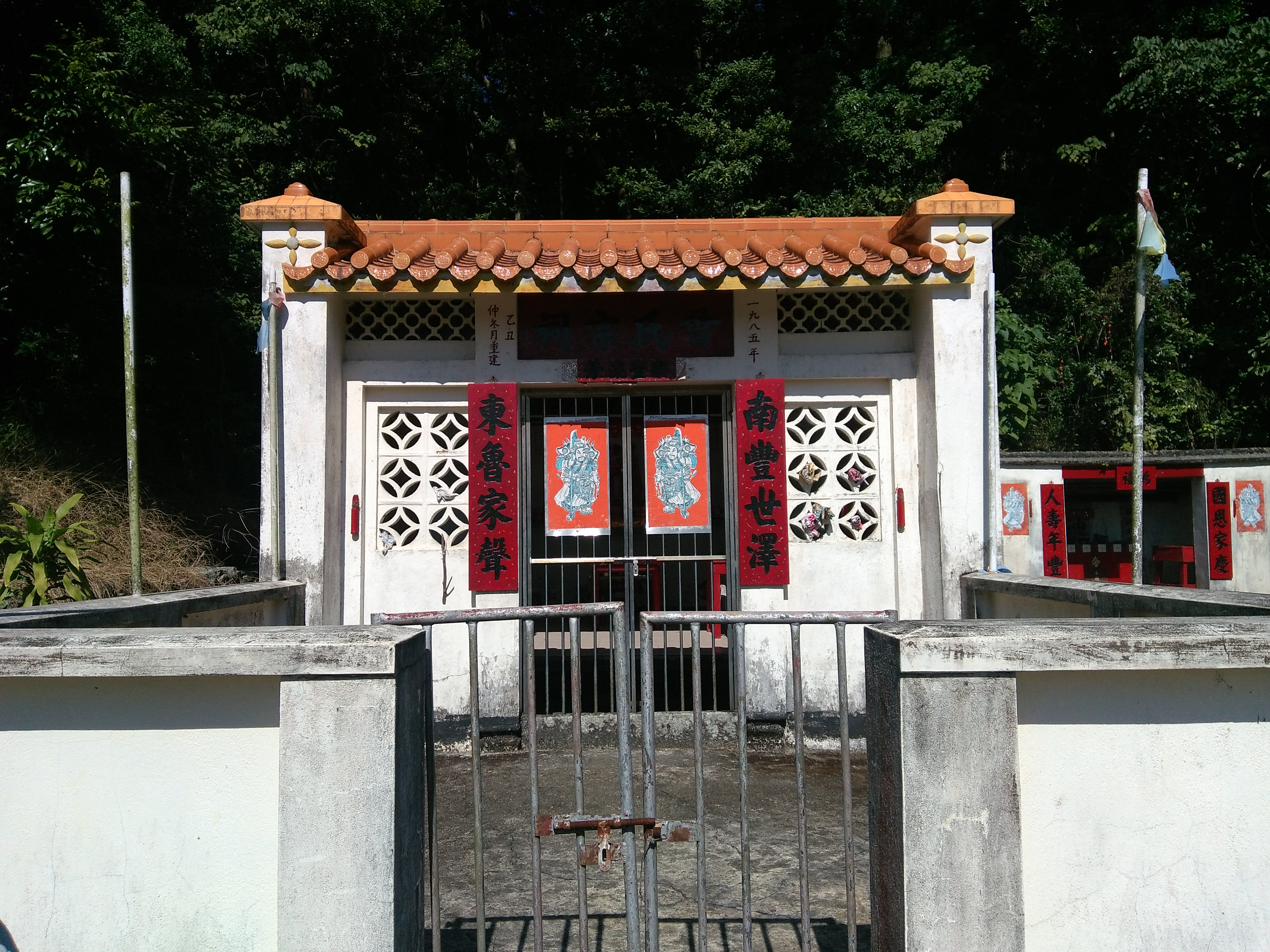
Tsang Ancestral Hall in Tai No.

Tai No (Chinese: 大腦) is a village in Sai Kung District, Hong Kong.

== Administration ==
Tai No is a recognized village under the New Territories Small House Policy.

== History ==
In 1955, Austin Coates described Tai No Sheung Yeung and Tin Liu as subsidiaries of Tai No.
