= List of gaps in Hong Kong =

This is a list of gaps and passes in Hong Kong.

== Hong Kong Island ==
- Chai Wan Gap (柴灣峽)
- Magazine Gap (馬己仙峽)
- Middle Gap (中峽)
- Pottinger Gap (馬塘坳)
- Quarry Gap (大風坳)
- Sandy Bay Gap (沙灣坳)
- Tai Tam Gap (大潭峽)
- Tsin Shui Wan Au (淺水灣凹)
- Victoria Gap (爐峰峽)
- Wan Chai Gap (灣仔峽)
- Windy Gap (大風坳, also 大風凹)
- Wong Nai Chung Gap (黃泥涌峽)

== New Territories ==
=== Between New Kowloon and New Territories ===
- Cha Liu Au (茶寮凹)
- Kowloon Pass (九龍凹)
- Ma Yau Tong Au (馬游塘坳)
- Pak Kung Au (伯公凹)
- Sha Tin Pass (沙田坳)
- Tate's Pass (大老坳)
- Tiu Keng Leng Au (調景嶺坳)
- Tiu Tso Ngam (吊草巖)

=== Mainland of New Territories ===
- Chui Fung Au (吹風坳)
- Chui Tung Au (吹筒坳)
- Lead Mine Pass (鉛礦坳)
- Ma On Au (馬鞍坳)
- Pak Tam Au (北潭坳)
- Pik Uk Au (壁屋凹)
- Shek Hang Au (石坑坳)
- Shui Long Wo (水浪窩)
- Tai Au Mun (大坳門, also 大澳門)
- Tai Long Au (大浪坳)
- Tai Miu Au (大廟坳)
- Tai Po Tsai Au (大埔仔坳)
- Tin Ha Au (田下坳)
- Tsuen Kam Au (荃錦坳), where Route Twisk passes by.
- Yung Pak Au (榕北坳)

=== Lantau Island ===
- Fan Shui Au (分水坳)
- Heung Chung Au (響鐘坳)
- Kan Tau Au (根頭坳)
- Mong To Au (望渡坳)
- Nam Shan (南山)
- Ngong Shuen Au (昂船凹)
- Pak Kung Au (also known as Tung Chung Gap, Tung Chung Au) (伯公坳, also 東涌坳)
- Sam Pak Au (三白坳)
- Shap Long Au (十塱坳)
- Sheung Tung Au (雙東坳)
- Sze Pak Au (四白坳)
- Tai Fung Au (大風坳)
- Wo Sheung Au (禾上坳)
- Yi Pak Au (二白坳)
