= Tai No Sheung Yeung =

Coordinates: 22.3689316°N 114.2332215°E

Tai No Sheung Yeung (Chinese: 大腦上陽) is a village in Sai Kung District, Hong Kong.

== Administration ==
Tai No Sheung Yeung is a recognized village under the New Territories Small House Policy.

== History ==
In 1955, Austin Coates described Tai No Sheung Yeung as a subsidiary of Tai No.
