= Sai Sha Road =

Road in Hong Kong

Coordinates: 22.4148415°N 114.2682027°E

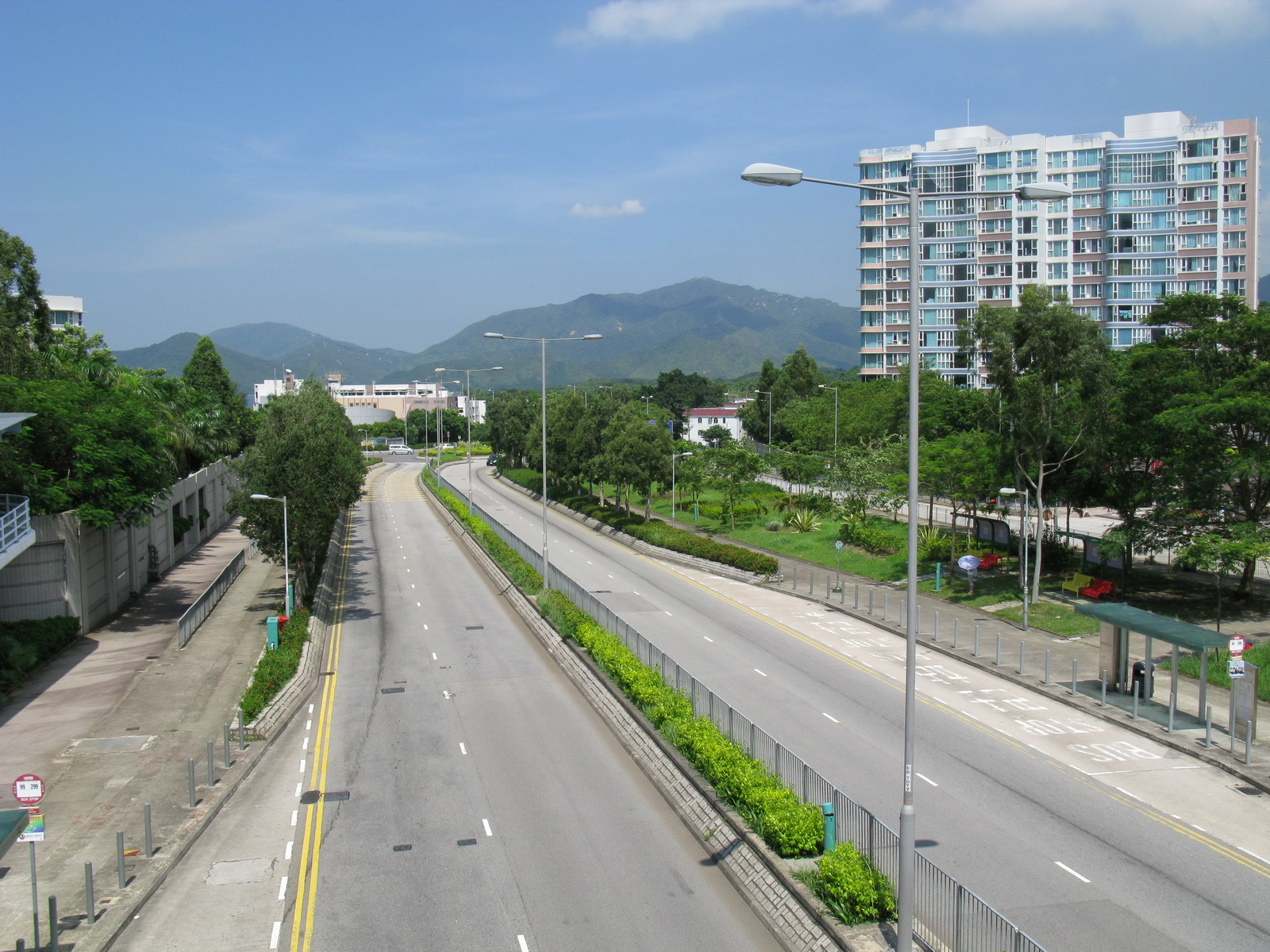
- Section of Sai Sha Road near Symphony Bay

- Location within Hong Kong
- Native name: 西沙路 (Chinese)
- Former name: Nai Chung Access Road
- Length: 11.2 kilometres
- Location: New Territories, Hong Kong

Construction
- Construction start: Late 1970s
- Inauguration: 27 October 1988; 37 years ago

Sai Sha Road
- Traditional Chinese: 西沙路
- Simplified Chinese: 西沙路
Transcriptions
Standard Mandarin
- Hanyu Pinyin: xī shā lù
Yue: Cantonese
- Yale Romanization: sai1 saa1 lou6

Sai Sha Road (Chinese: 西沙路) is a main road connecting Sai Kung and Ma On Shan. It begins at the roundabout at Mak Pin, Sai Kung and passes through Three Fathoms Cove and Shap Sze Heung before traversing the new town of Ma On Shan and Wu Kai Sha and ending at Hang Tak Street in Tai Shui Hang.

The MTR Tuen Ma line track section between Heng On station and Wu Kai Sha station is placed directly above Sai Sha Road. Other than MTR stations, several estates lie next to the road. The length of the road is approximately 11.2 km. Despite the road having close to no slope, it includes many bends.

Cycling is prohibited along most of Sai Sha Road on Sundays and public holidays along the section from near Nai Chung bus stop to Mak Pin roundabout, where the road is narrow and busy with continuous double white lines and few passing places.

== History ==
Construction of the road began in the late 1970s. It originally stretched from Tai Mong Tsai to Nai Chung, hence the original name of the road was Nai Chung Access Road. In 1986, its name was altered to Sai Sha Road and has retained this name since then. Two years later, it was open to traffic, with the connection between Sha Tin New Town and Ma On Shan finally complete.

== See also ==
- Shui Long Wo
