= Sai Kung North (constituency) =

- 西贡北
- Elected constituency for the Tai Po District Council
- Boundary of Sai Kung North in Tai Po District
- District: Tai Po
- Legislative Council constituency: New Territories North East
- Population: 14,102 (2019)
- Electorate: 6,814 (2019)

Current constituency
- Created: 1982
- Number of members: One
- Member(s): Vacant

Sai Kung North is one of the 19 constituencies in the Tai Po District. The constituency returns one district councillor to the Tai Po District Council, with an election every four years.

Sai Kung North constituency is loosely based on northern part of the Sai Kung Peninsula, also called 'Sai Kung North', with estimated population of 14,102.

== Councillors represented ==
Election	Member	Party
1982	Wong Lap-kwong	Nonpartisan
1988	David Ho Tai-wai	Nonpartisan
2012	David Ho Tai-wai	Economic Synergy
2013	David Ho Tai-wai	BPA
2015	Rex Li Wah-kwong	BPA
2019	Ben Tam Yi-pui→Vacant	Nonpartisan

== Election results ==
=== 2010s ===
Tai Po District Council Election, 2019: Sai Kung North
Party	Candidate	Votes	%	±%
Nonpartisan	Ben Tam Yi-pui	2,730	58.16	
BPA	Rex Li Wah-kwong	1,964	41.84	−8.65
Majority		766	16.32	
Turnout		4,711	69.16	
Nonpartisan gain from BPA		Swing		

Tai Po District Council Election, 2015: Sai Kung North
Party	Candidate	Votes	%	±%
BPA	Rex Li Wah-kwong	1,024	50.49	
Nonpartisan	Victor Li Kwai-yau	1,004	49.51	
Majority		20	0.98	
Turnout		2,028	35.25	
BPA hold		Swing		

Tai Po District Council Election, 2011: Sai Kung North
Party	Candidate	Votes	%	±%
Nonpartisan	David Ho Tai-wai	1,404	66.41	+1.22
Nonpartisan	Li Yiu-ban	710	33.59	
Majority		694	32.82	+1.56
Nonpartisan hold		Swing		

=== 2000s ===
Tai Po District Council Election, 2007: Sai Kung North
Party	Candidate	Votes	%	±%
Nonpartisan	David Ho Tai-wai	1,079	65.63	
Nonpartisan	Luen Kwok-fai	565	34.37	
Majority		514	31.26	
Nonpartisan hold		Swing		

Tai Po District Council Election, 2003: Sai Kung North
Party	Candidate	Votes	%	±%
Nonpartisan	David Ho Tai-wai	Uncontested		
Nonpartisan hold		Swing		

=== 1990s ===
Tai Po District Council Election, 1999: Sai Kung North
Party	Candidate	Votes	%	±%
Nonpartisan	David Ho Tai-wai	Uncontested		
Nonpartisan hold		Swing		

Tai Po District Board Election, 1994: Sai Kung North
Party	Candidate	Votes	%	±%
Nonpartisan	David Ho Tai-wai	Uncontested		
Nonpartisan hold		Swing		

Tai Po District Board Election, 1991: Sai Kung North
Party	Candidate	Votes	%	±%
Nonpartisan	David Ho Tai-wai	Uncontested		
Nonpartisan hold		Swing		

=== 1980s ===
Tai Po District Board Election, 1988: Sai Kung North
Party	Candidate	Votes	%	±%
Nonpartisan	David Ho Tai-wai	886	75.47	
Nonpartisan	Wong Lap-kwong	288	25.53	−49.52
Majority		598	49.95	
Nonpartisan gain from Nonpartisan		Swing		

Tai Po District Board Election, 1985: Sai Kung North
Party	Candidate	Votes	%	±%
Nonpartisan	Wong Lap-kwong	409	75.05	+22.01
Nonpartisan	Shek Kai-man	136	25.95	
Majority		273	49.06	
Nonpartisan hold		Swing		

Tai Po District Board Election, 1982: Sai Kung North
Party	Candidate	Votes	%	±%
Nonpartisan	Wong Lap-kwong	199	60.67	
Nonpartisan	Lam Ping	129	39.33	
Majority		70	21.34	
Nonpartisan win (new seat)				
