= Sai Kung North =

Area in the New Territories, Hong Kong

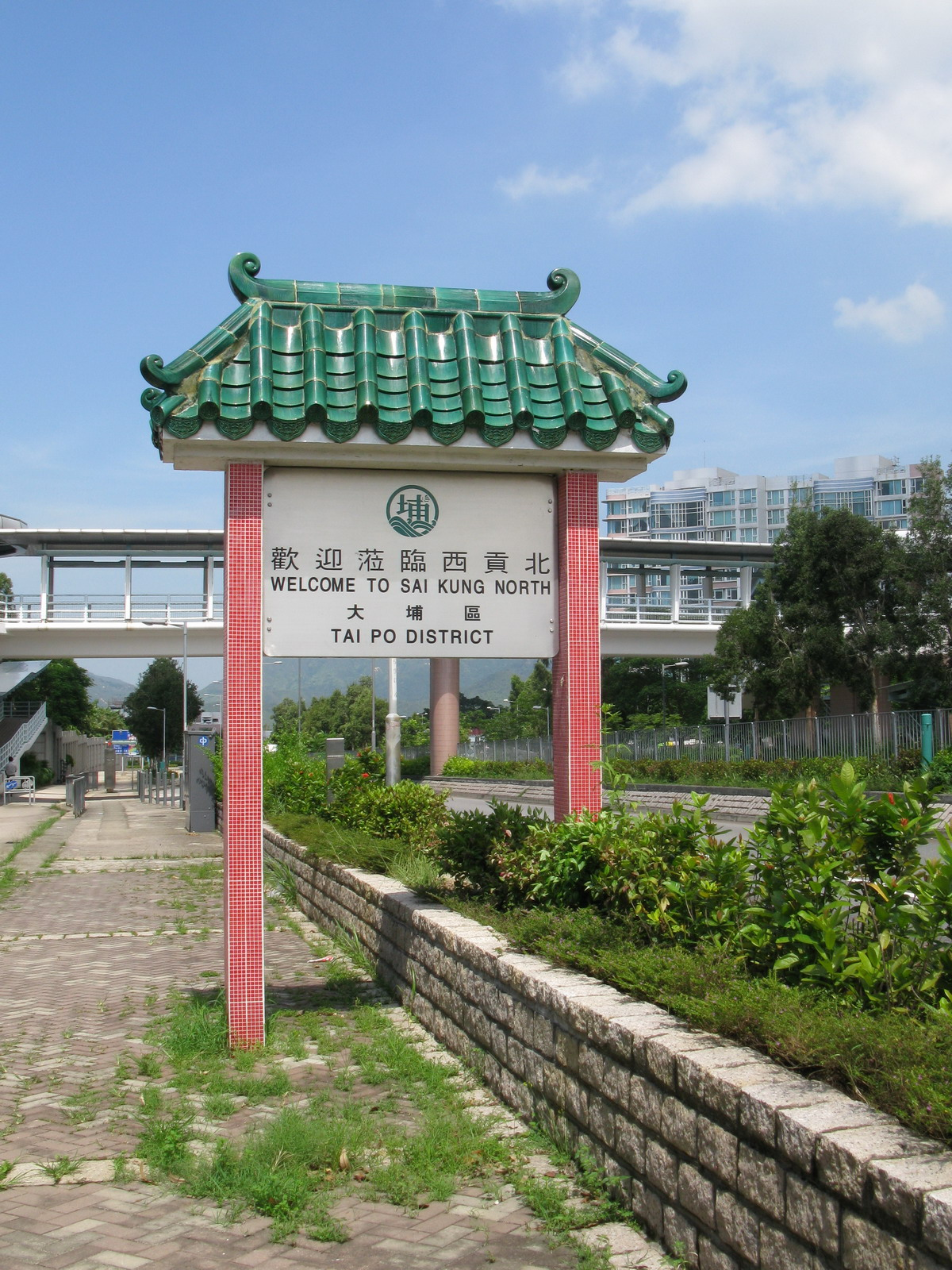
- "Welcome to Sai Kung North" sign along Sai Sha Road in Wu Kai Sha.
- Traditional Chinese: 西貢北
Transcriptions
Yue: Cantonese
- Yale Romanization: Sāi gung bāk
- Jyutping: Sai1 gung3 bak1
- IPA: [sɐ́i.kōŋ.pɐ́k̚]

Sai Kung North refers collectively to the areas on the southern side of Tolo Harbour and the northernmost part of the Sai Kung Peninsula. Part of this broad area is served by Sai Sha Road, a motorway between Sai Kung and Ma On Shan.

== Geography ==
Geographically it is a practical exclave of Tai Po District, along with Shek Ngau Chau, Tap Mun and Tung Ping Chau.

It includes the following areas:

- Hoi Ha
- Kei Ling Ha
- Nai Chung
- Pak Tam Au
- Port Island (Chek Chau)
- Sham Chung
- Tap Mun
- Wong Shek
- Wong Tei Tung

== Transport ==
The area historically relied on ferry transport from Tai Po Kau, until the pier there was relocated to Ma Liu Shui. The opening of Sai Sha Road and the development of Ma On Shan has made road transport available to the areas to the west of Three Fathoms Cove.

== Politics and rural affairs ==
Sai Kung North is covered by the Sai Kung North constituency in the Tai Po District Council. The Sai Kung North Rural Committee comprises the villages in the area, some of which known collectively as Shap Sze Heung.

== See also ==
- Hoi Ha Wan
- Three Fathoms Cove
