= Sham Chung =

Village and area of Neolithic settlement in Hong Kong

Coordinates: 22.4426°N 114.2885°E

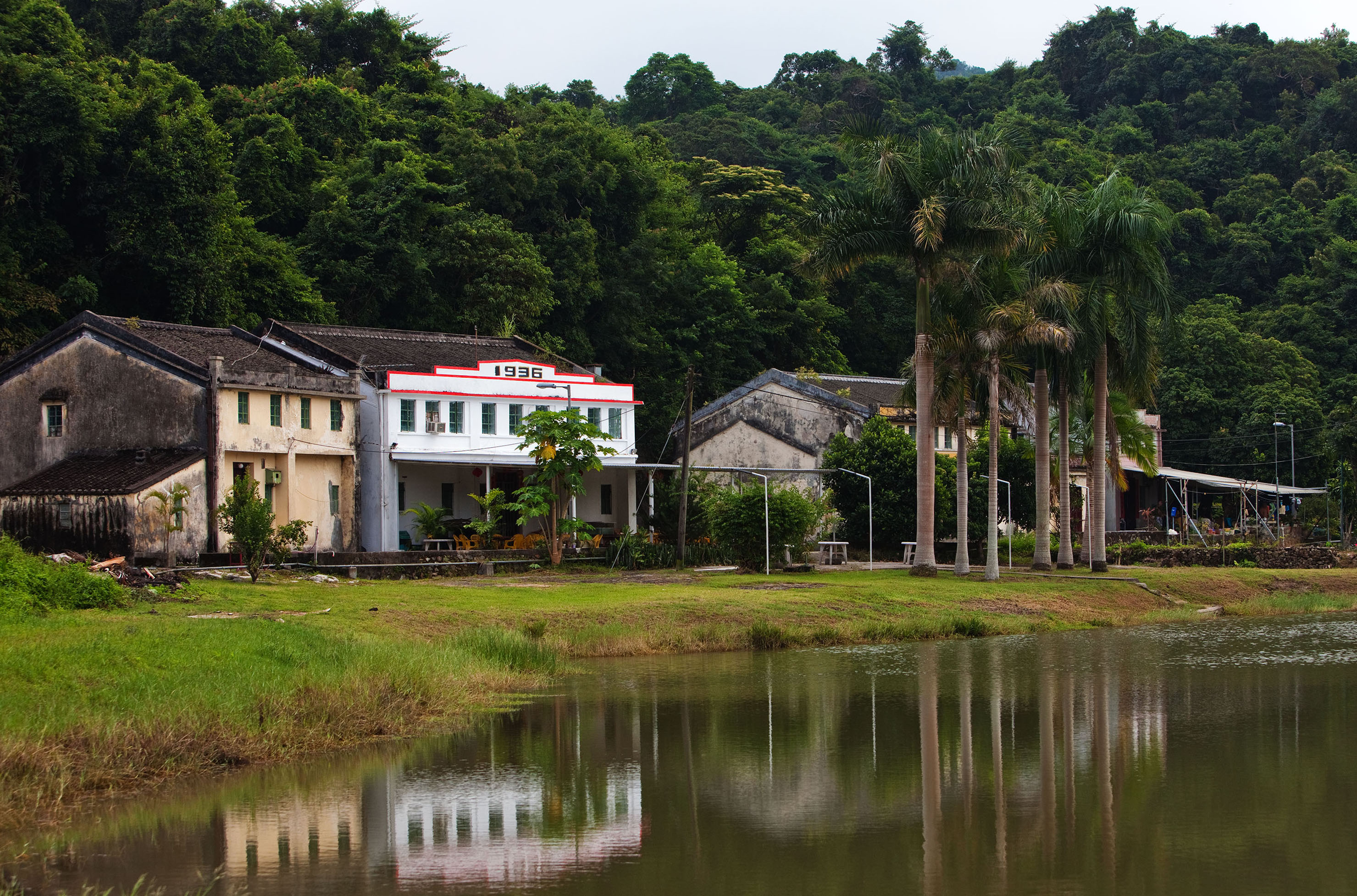
Sham Chung, Hong Kong.

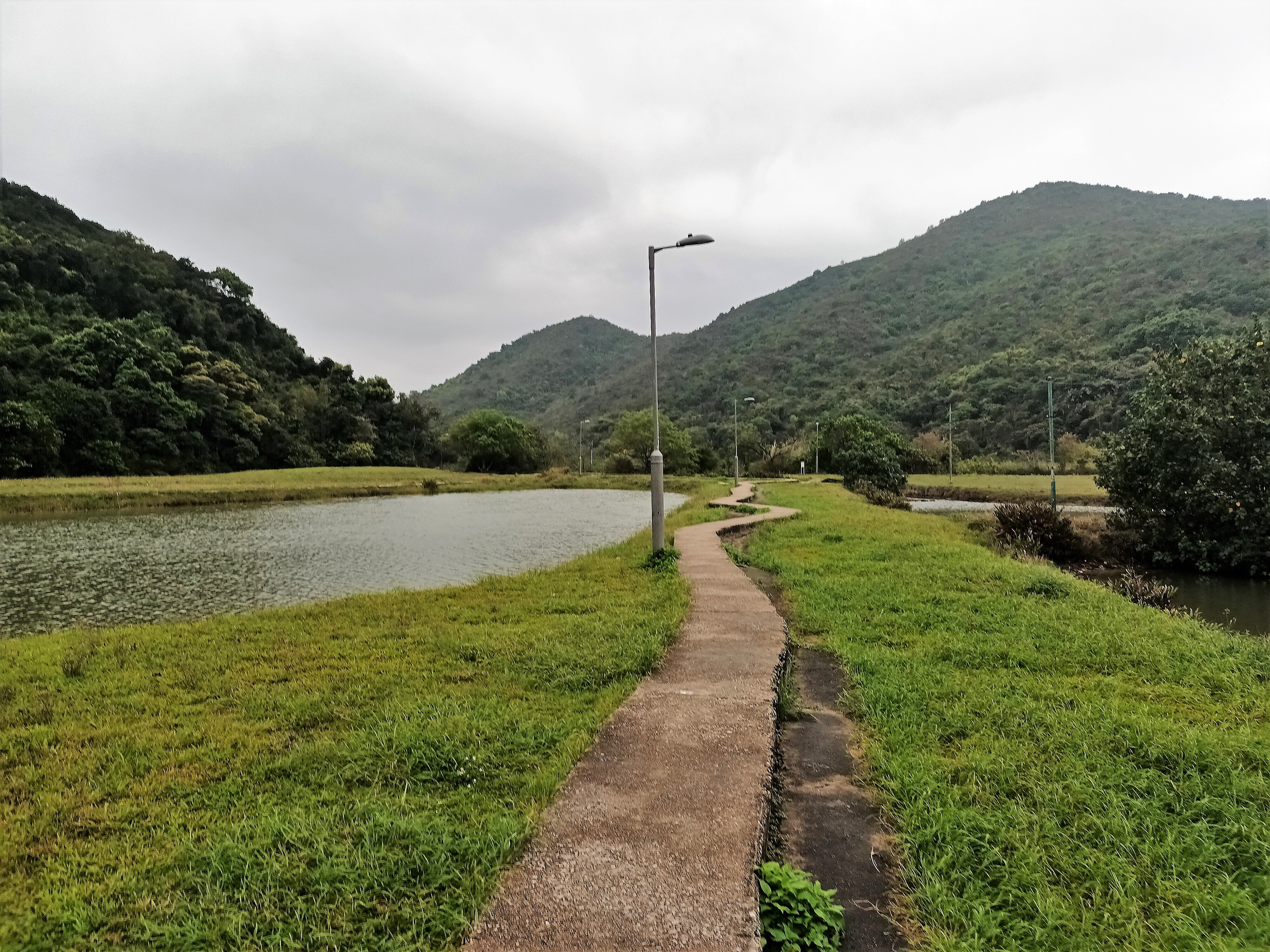
Sham Chung.

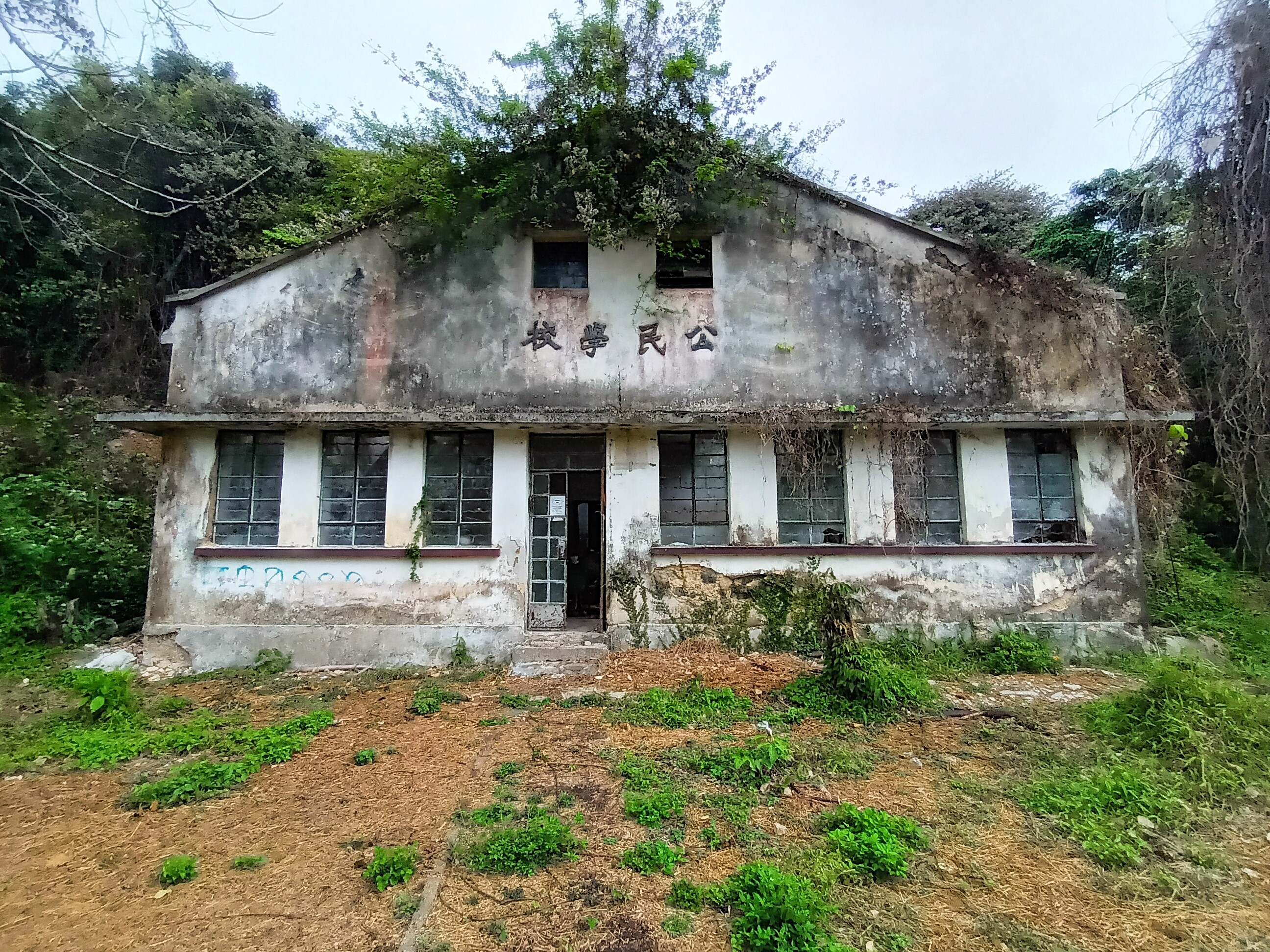
Epiphany of Our Lord Chapel in Sham Chung in 2022. The inscription on the facade reads "公民學校" (Kung Man School).

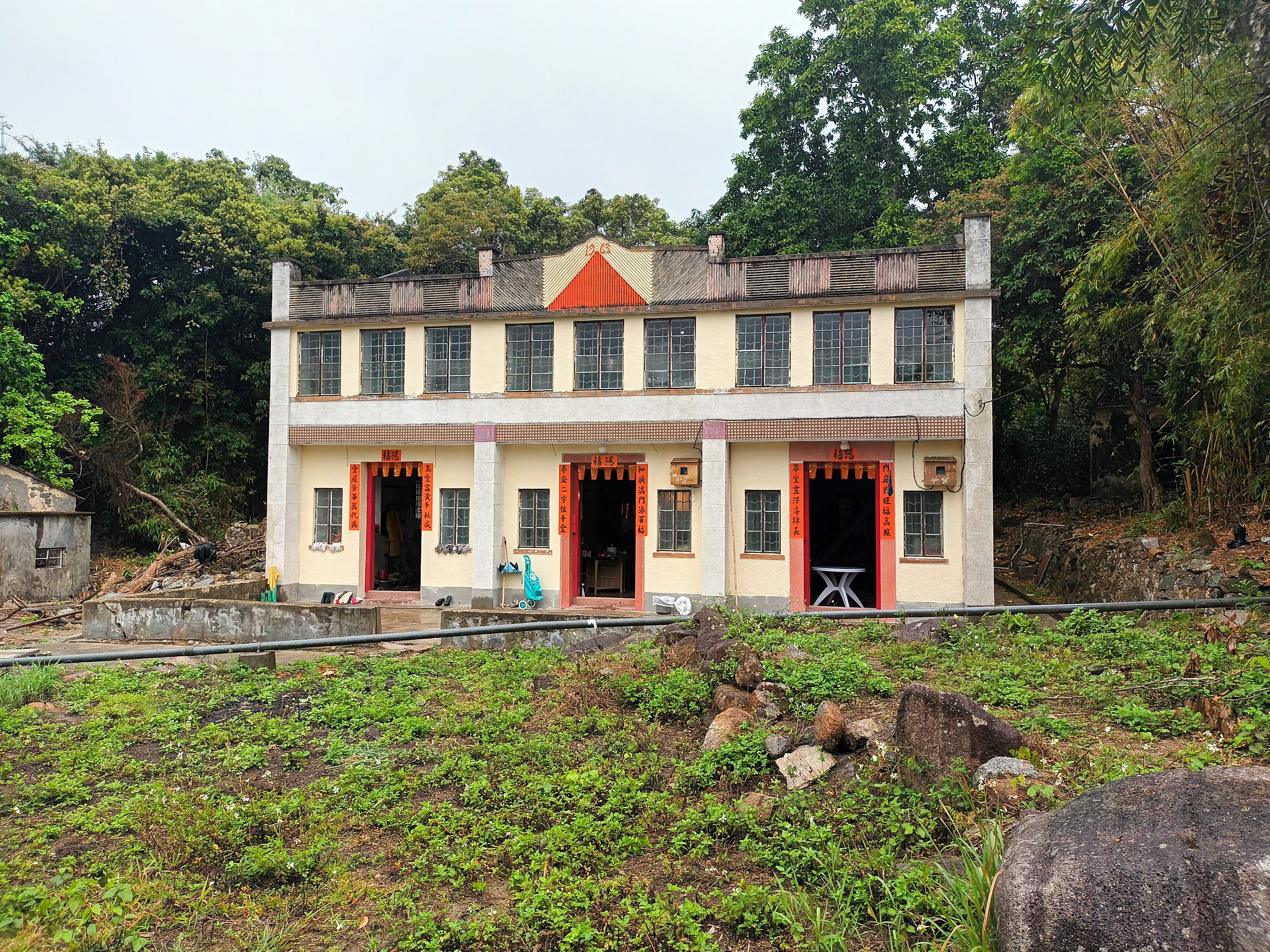
House in Sham Chung.

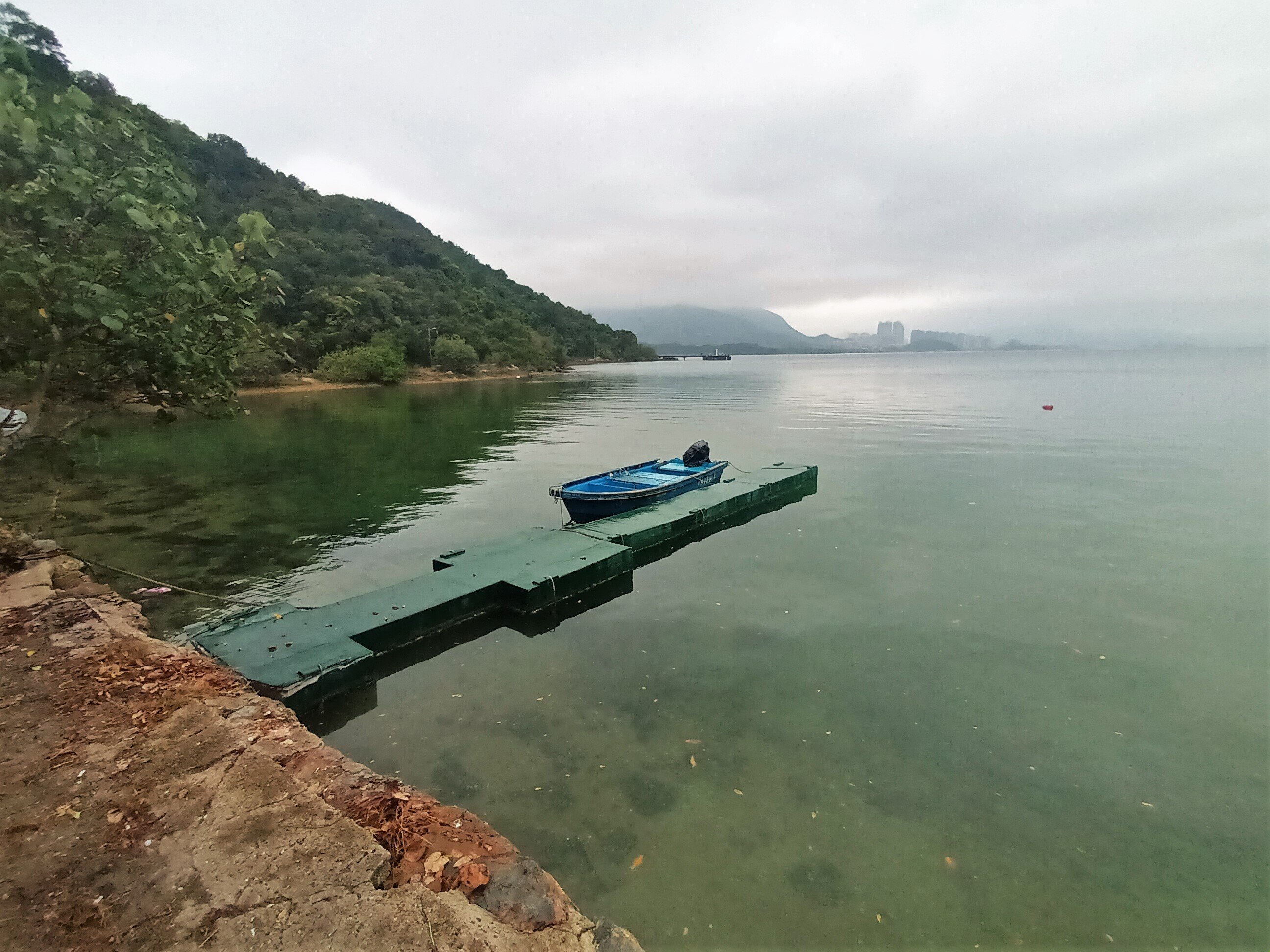
Coast at Sham Chung. Sham Chung Pier is visible in the background.

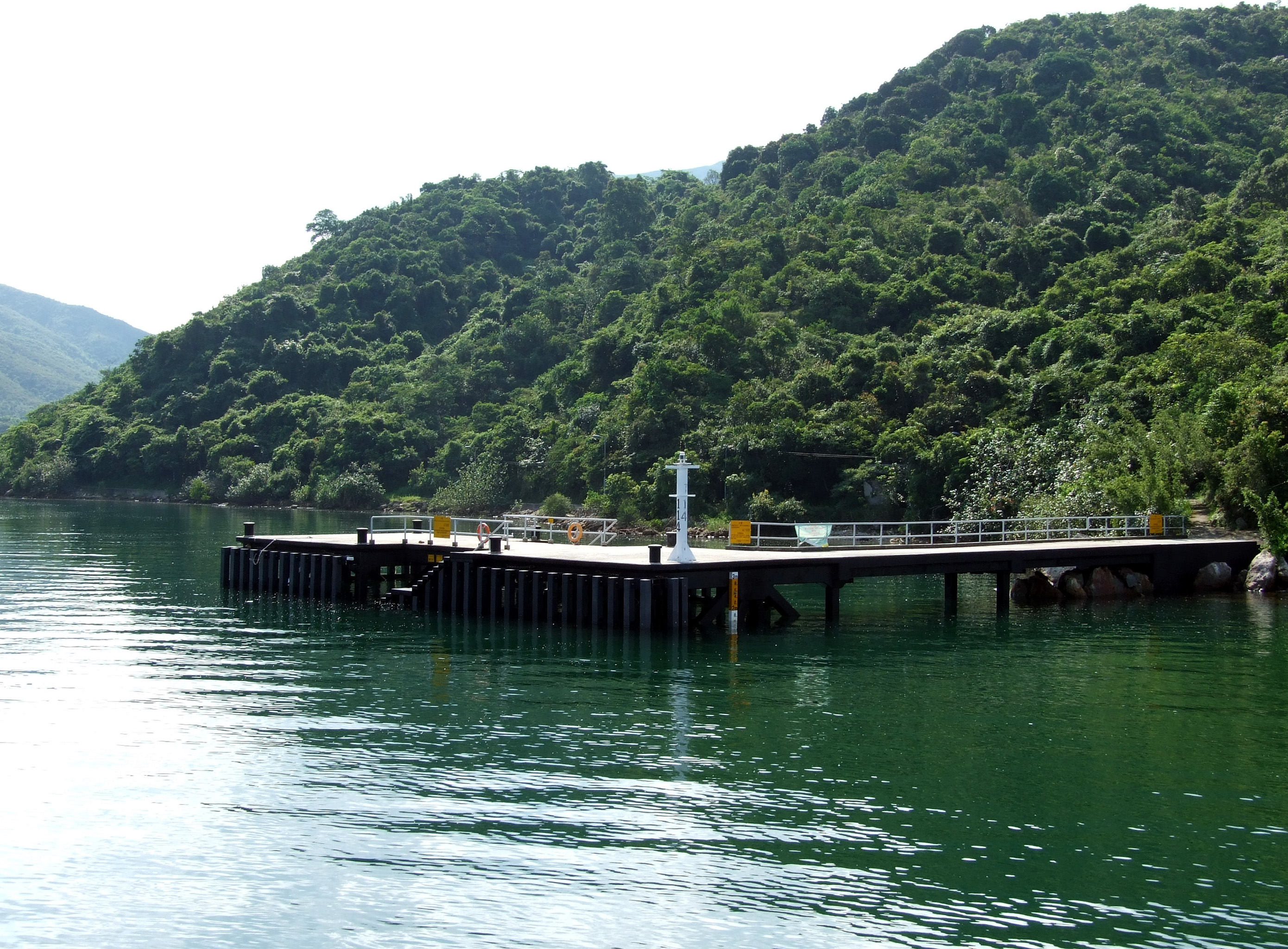
Sham Chung Pier.

Sham Chung (Chinese: 深涌) is a Hakka village and an area of Neolithic settlement in Hong Kong. It is located in the south of Tolo Channel, beside Three Fathoms Cove on the Sai Kung Peninsula. Administratively, it is part of Tai Po District.

== Administration ==
Sham Chung is a recognized village under the New Territories Small House Policy.

== History ==
Late Paleolithic and Early Neolithic have been excavated at the nearby Wong Tei Tung site.

Sham Chung Village was first settled by members of the Lee (李) clan and later by members of the Wong (黃) clan. The Lees came from Wu Kau Tang, in today's northeastern New Territories, during the reign of Qianlong Emperor (1736-1795). It has been reported that the villages of Sham Chung, Lai Chi Chong and Pak Sha O had historically close social ties.

In 1870, Father Luigi Piazzoli, who later became Apostolic Vicar of Hong Kong (1895-1904), left the mission station in Ting Kok and started his missionary work in Sham Chung, helping the farmers build a dam.

In the late 1990s and 2000s, Sun Hung Kai Properties planned to build a golf course and a recreation centre in Sham Chung. In 1999, part of the natural wetland was converted into a grass field, but the application for the change of land use was eventually rejected by the Town Planning Board.

== Features ==
Sham Chung can be sub-divided into five areas: Ha Wai (下圍), Shek Tau King (石頭徑), Pao Wai Tsai or Pao Nei Tsai (包圍仔 or 包蘺仔), Wan Tsai (灣仔) and Dui Min Tsuen (對面村).

The Epiphany of Our Lord Chapel (三王來朝小堂) in Ha Wai, is a former Catholic church and one of the historic churches of Sai Kung Peninsula. It was established in 1879 and rebuilt in 1956. The Chapel housed a school called Kung Man School (公民學校), which had about 50 pupils and two teachers.

== Fauna ==
It was reported in 2006, that Sham Chung was home to 27 bird species, 19 freshwater fish species and 28 butterfly species. A survey conducted by Green Power in 2011 listed rare species found in Sham Chung. They included the endemic Hong Kong paradise fish (Macropodus hongkongensis), dragonflies including the sapphire flutterer (Rhyothemis triangularis), at least 68 butterfly species (in Sham Chung and Yung Shue O), including the very rare Commander (Moduza procris) and the rare broadtail royal (Creon cleobis).

== Conservation ==
In 2004, Sham Chung was listed as one of the 12 Most Ecologically Valued Conservation Sites by the Hong Kong Government.

Sham Shung Coast, a belt of coast between Sham Chung Wan (深涌灣; 'Sham Chung Bay') and Tung King Pai (aka. Flat Reef or Bun Sha Pai), located on the southern side of Tolo Channel and in the north-eastern part of Sai Kung Peninsula, covering an area of 26 hectares, was designated as a Site of Special Scientific Interest in 1985. The site has been described as containing rich assemblages of fossil, including bivalves, micro fossils, plant fossils, ammonites, gastropods and crinoids.

== Transport ==
Sham Chung is served by a scheduled kai-to ferry service, along the route Ma Liu Shui – Sham Chung – Lai Chi Chong – Tap Mun – Ko Lau Wan – Chek Keng – Wong Shek Pier. Sham Chung Pier was built in the 1960s.

Hiking paths connect Sham Chung to Lai Chi Chong, Pak Sha O and Yung Shue O.

== See also ==
- Prehistoric Hong Kong
- Site of Special Scientific Interest (Hong Kong)
