= Three Fathoms Cove =

Cove in Hong Kong

Coordinates: 22.424982°N 114.27678°E

- Traditional Chinese: 企嶺下海
- Simplified Chinese: 企岭下海
- Cantonese Yale: Kéihlíhnghahhói
Transcriptions
Standard Mandarin
- Hanyu Pinyin: Qílǐngxiàhǎi
- Wade–Giles: Ch‘i^{2}-ling^{3}-hsia^{4}-hai^{3}
- IPA: [tɕʰǐ.lìŋ.ɕjâ.xàɪ]
Yue: Cantonese
- Yale Romanization: Kéihlíhnghahhói
- Jyutping: kei5 ling5 haa6 hoi2
- IPA: [kʰej˩˧.lɪŋ˩˧.ha˨.hɔj˧˥]

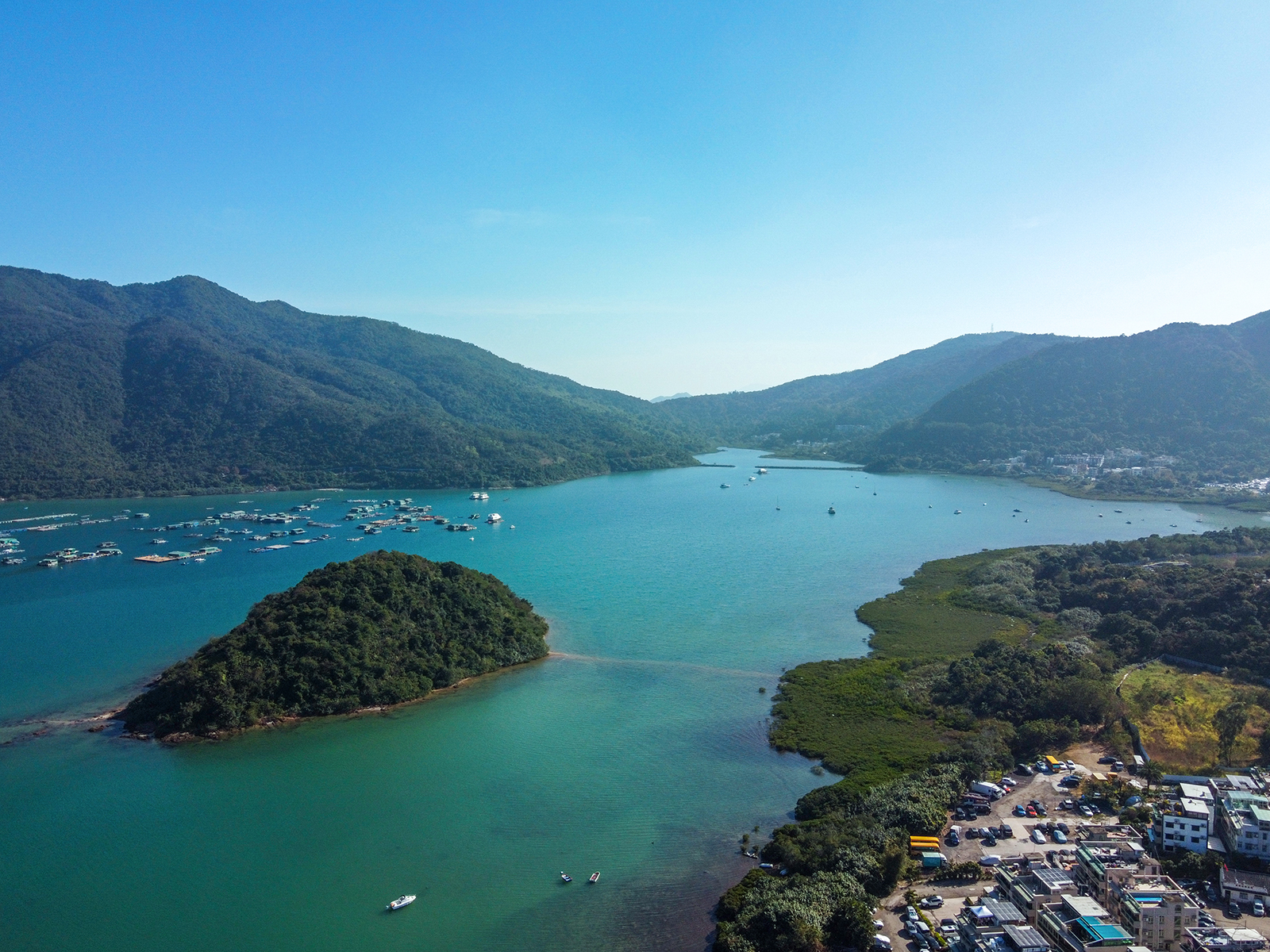
Wu Chau in Three Fathoms Cove. The village on the right is Tseng Tau.

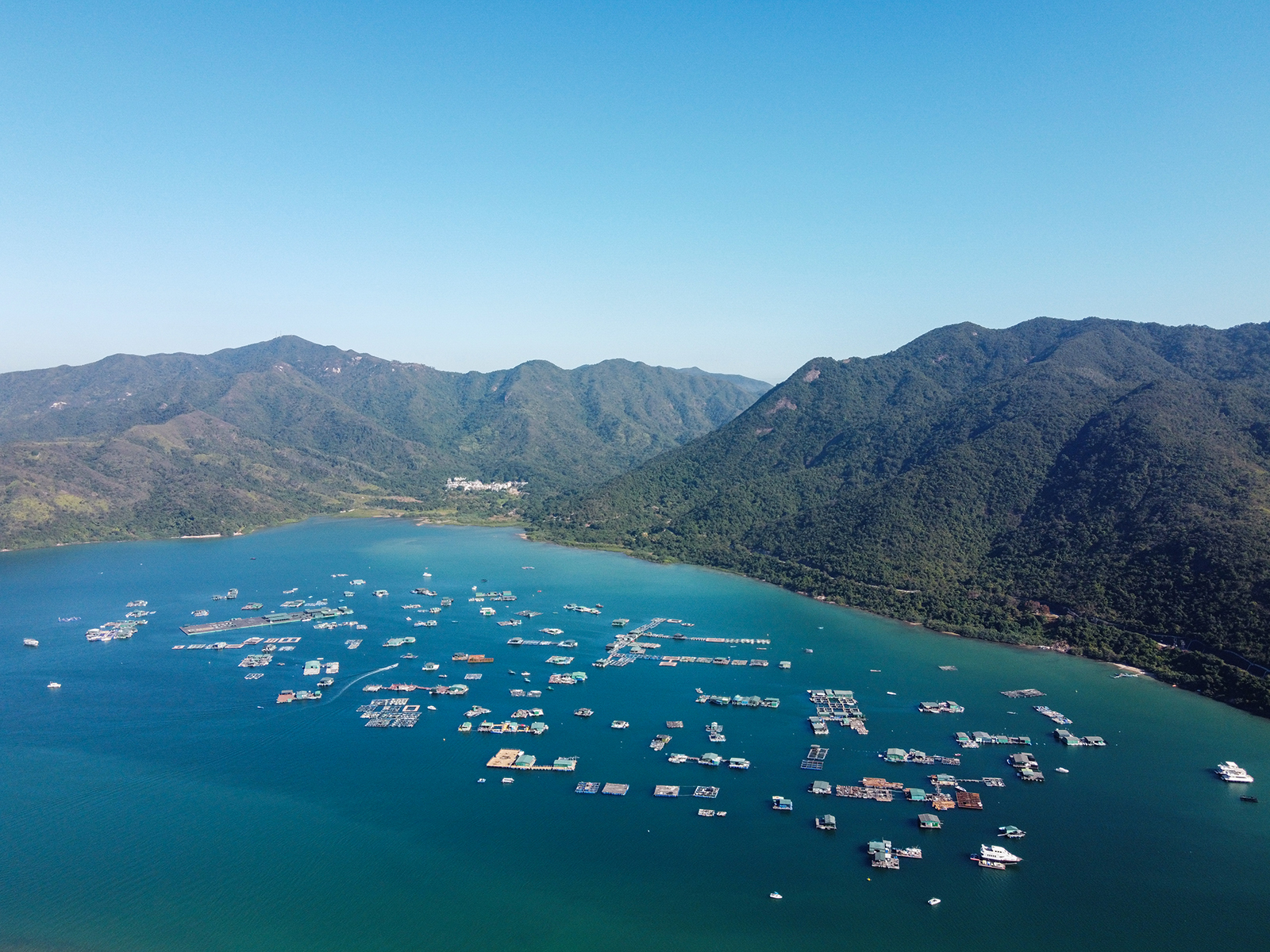
Distant view of Yung Shue O across Three Fathoms Cove. The marine fish culture zone is visible in the foreground.

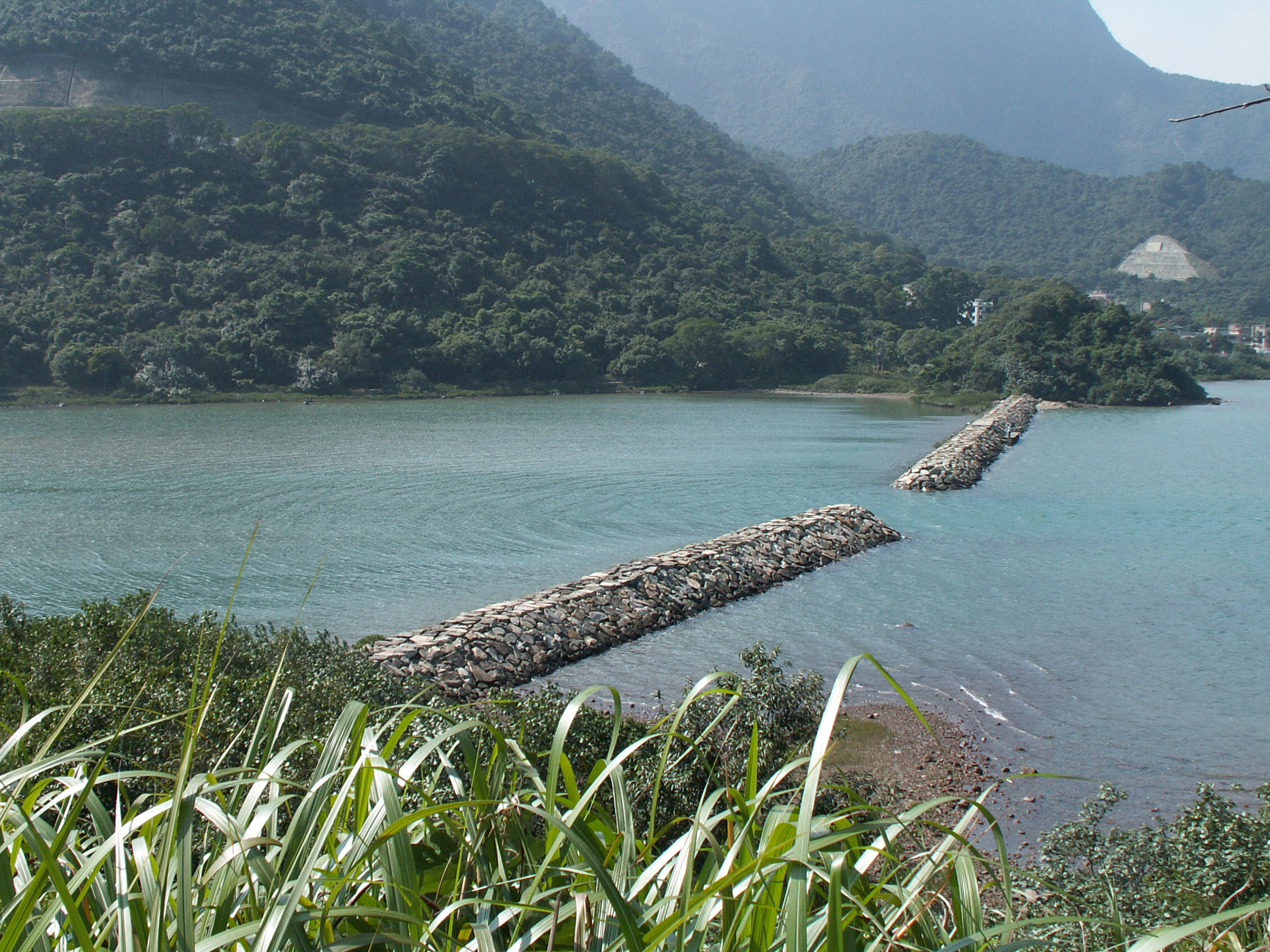
Breakwater at Kei Ling Ha, near the innermost section of Three Fathoms Cove.

Three Fathoms Cove or Kei Ling Ha Hoi (Chinese: 企嶺下海) is a cove in Tai Po District, Hong Kong.

== Geography ==
Three Fathoms Cove is surrounded by Shap Sze Heung (Tseng Tau, Nga Yiu Tau, Sai Keng and Kei Ling Ha are along the coast), Yung Shue O, Wong Tei Tung and Sham Chung. Most of its east shore constitutes part of the Sai Kung West Country Park.

To the north the cove is connected to Tolo Harbour and the Tolo Channel. The islands of Sam Pui Chau (三杯酒) and Wu Chau (烏洲) are located within the cove.

== Features ==
A section of Three Fathoms Cove located offshore of Yung Shue O is one of the 26 designated marine fish culture zones in Hong Kong.

== Conservation ==
Tseng Tau Coast, a coastal area of 1 km in length located north of Tseng Tau village and facing Three Fathom Cove, covering an area of 4.3 hectares, was designated as a Site of Special Scientific Interest in 1994.
