= Wu Chau =

Wu Chau is the name of two islands of Hong Kong:

- Wu Chau (North District)
- Wu Chau (Tai Po District)

Wu Chau is also an old transliteration of the Chinese city of Wuzhou
