= Bluff Head =

Bluff Head may refer to:

- Bluff Head, Hong Kong, also known as Wong Ma Kok, a cape at Stanley Peninsula, Hong Kong Island, Hong Kong
- Wong Chuk Kok Tsui, previously known as Bluff Head, a cape at Wong Chuk Kok Peninsula, New Territories, Hong Kong
