= Pak Sha O =

Village and area in Hong Kong

Coordinates: 22.4489°N 114.31955°E

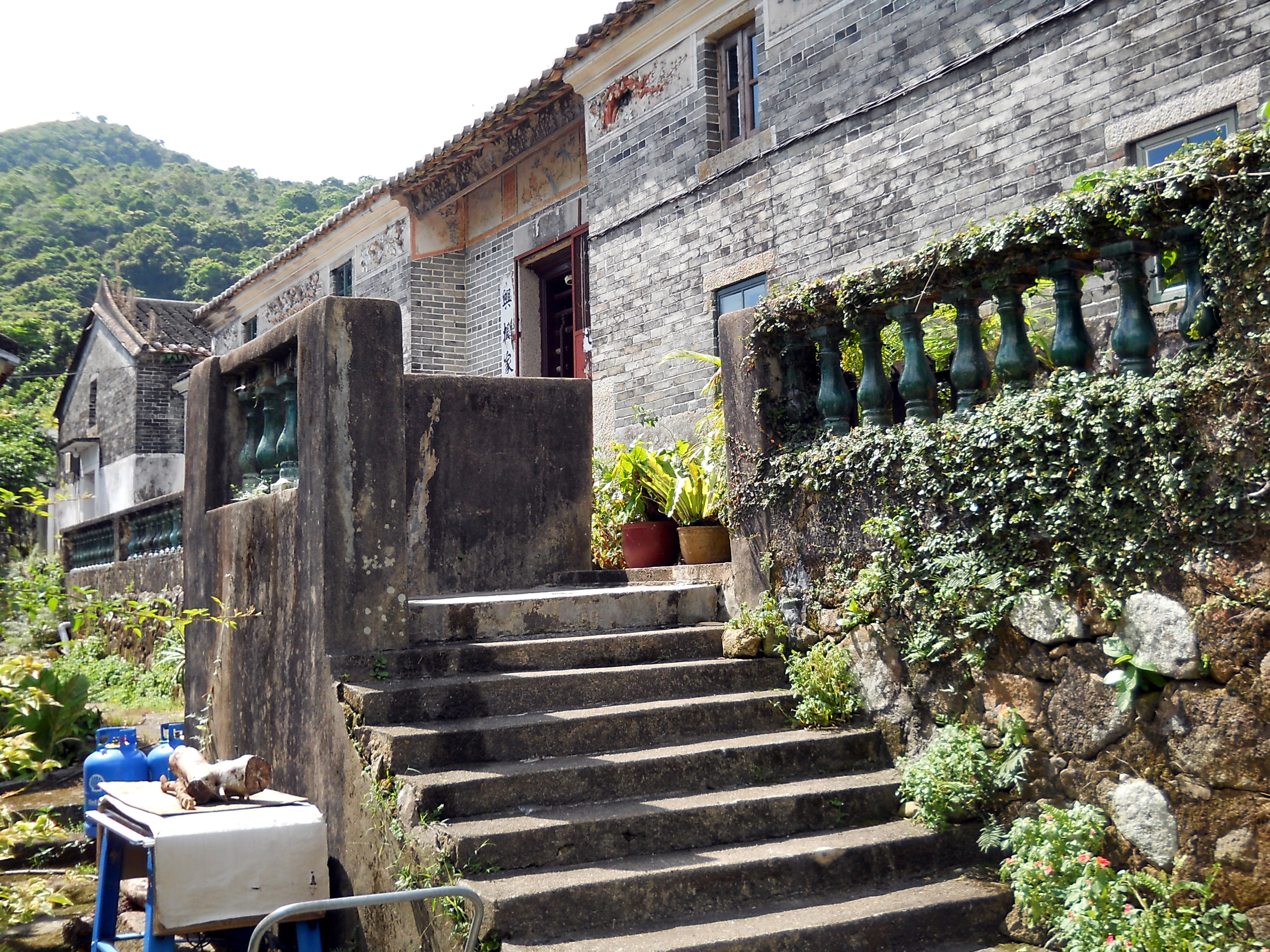
Entrance Hall of Ho Residence in Pak Sha O.

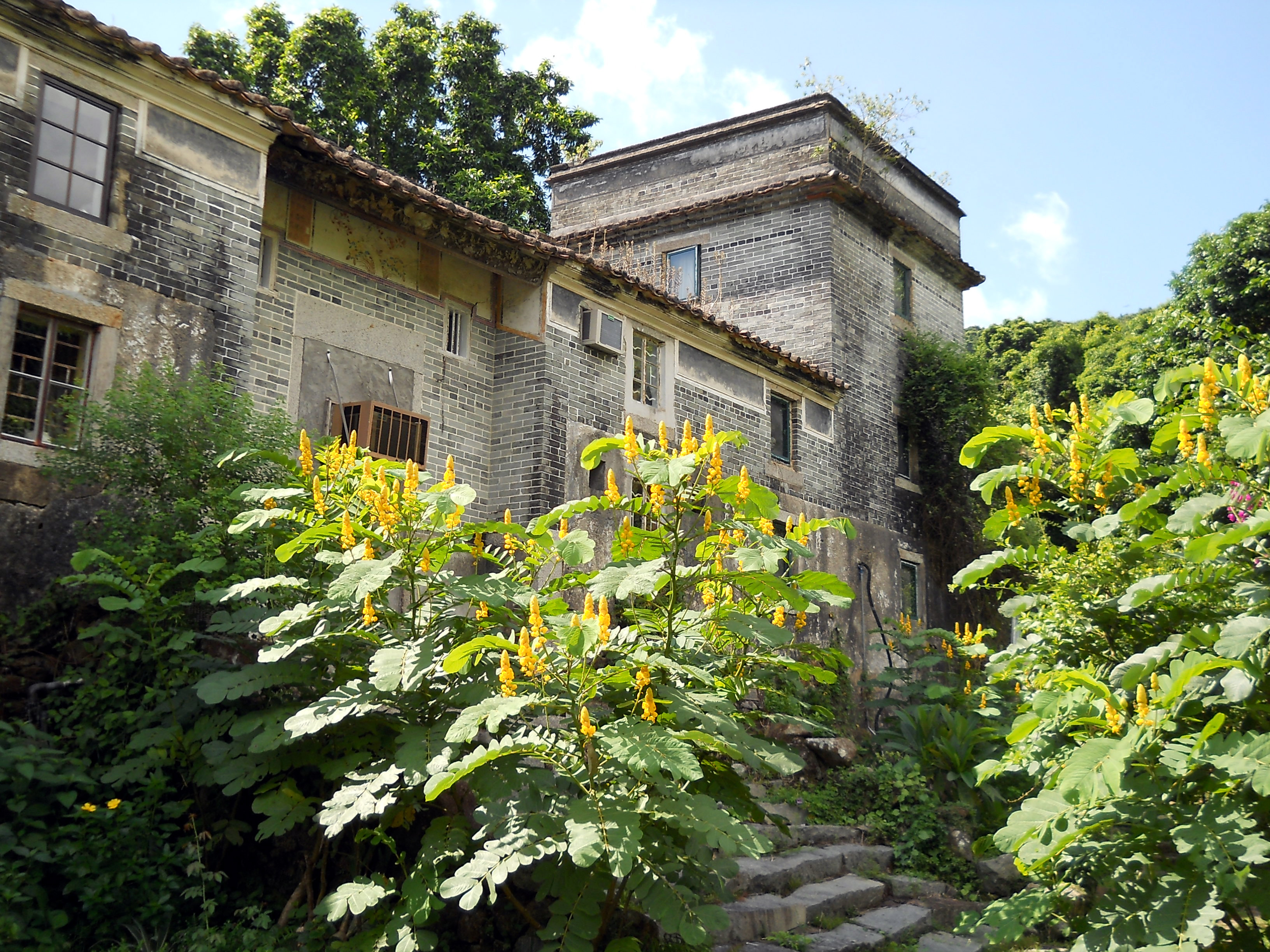
Watchtower Ho Residence in Pak Sha O.

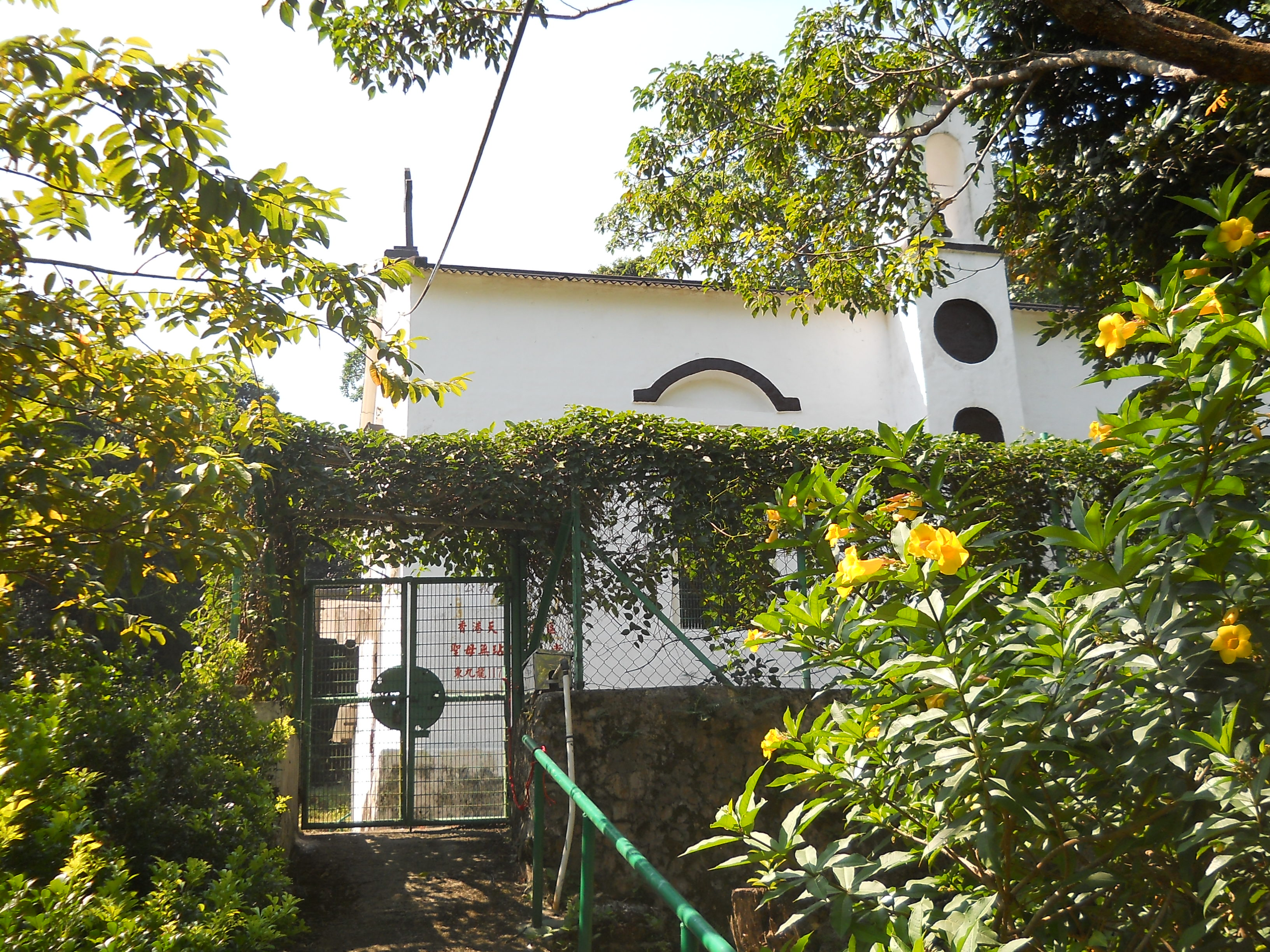
Immaculate Heart of Mary Chapel.

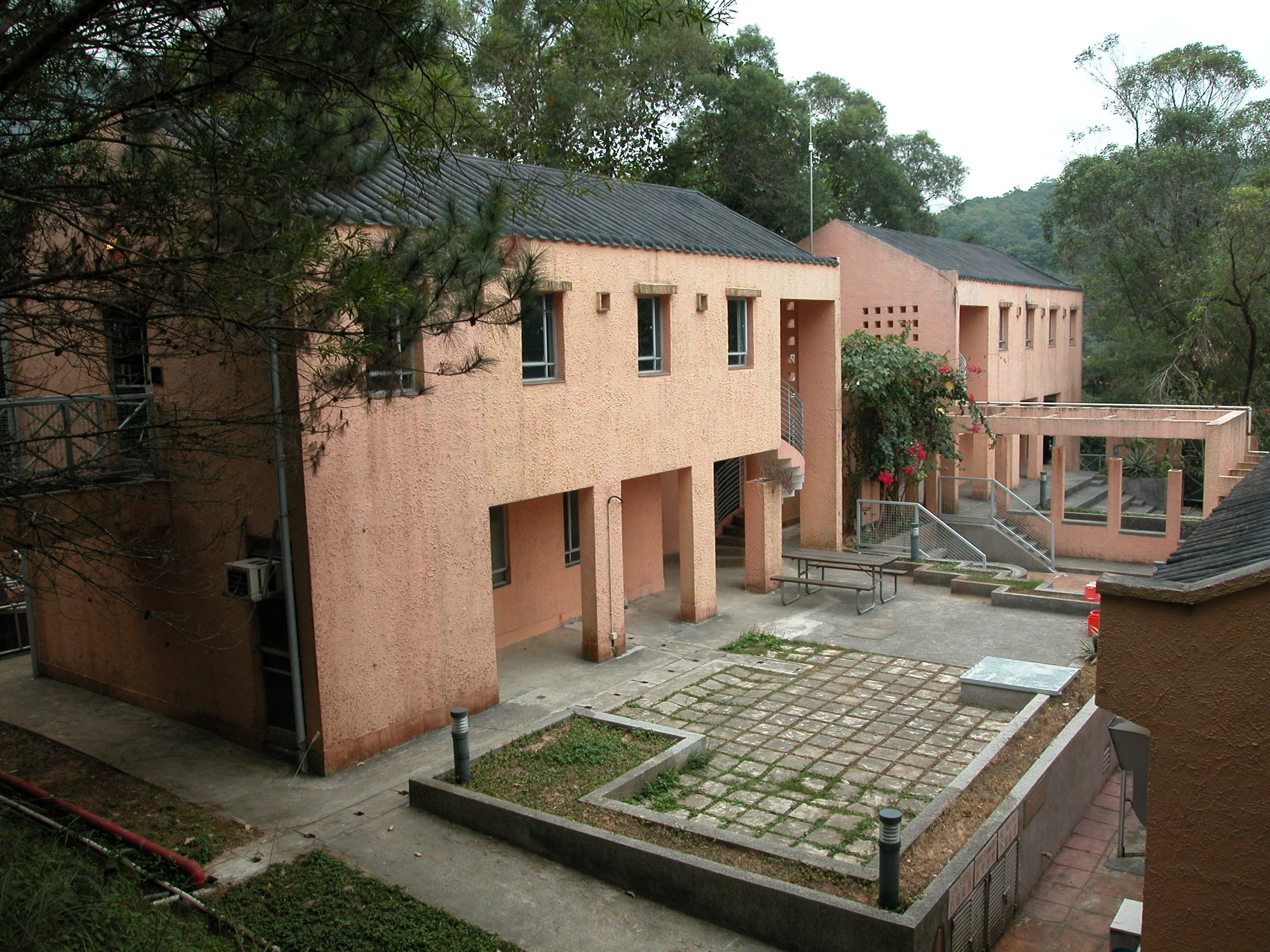
Pak Sha O Youth Hostel.

Pak Sha O (Chinese: 白沙澳) is an area and a village of Sai Kung North, in Tai Po District, Hong Kong.

== Administration ==
Pak Sha O and Pak Sha O Ha Yeung (白沙澳下洋) are recognized villages under the New Territories Small House Policy.

== History ==
Pak Sha O Village, located south of Pak Hoi Ha in Sai Kung, New Territories, has a history dating back to the 17th century.

It has been reported that the villages of Sham Chung, Lai Chi Chong and Pak Sha O had historically close social ties.

At the time of the 1911 census, the population of Pak Sha O was 117. The number of males was 52.

In 1799, a Hakka family surnamed Yung arrived in Hong Kong from mainland China and settled in Sai Kung's Hoi Ha. A descendant of the Yung family, Yung Shi-chiu, dissatisfied with the crowded housing, relocated his family to nearby Pak Sha O Ha Yang in 1918, establishing a large mansion and renaming it "King Siu Sai kui" His close friend and fellow Hakka, Ho Yi-ko, built the Ho Clan House in Pak Sha O Village across the street, establishing his home there. However, in the 1970s, the government constructed the High Island Reservoir and a dam at Hoi Ha, significantly reducing the flow of the Pak Sha O River, a phenomenon known as "water diversion." Farmland became uncultivable, forcing villagers to leave their homes and some even emigrate.

== Chapel ==
Pak Sha O is the site of the Immaculate Heart of Mary Chapel (聖母無玷之心小堂). A first chapel was built in Pak Sha O in 1880 on another site. The conversion of Pak Sha O into a Catholic village partly resulted from the desire of the villagers to combat the harassment of the tax-lords of Sheung Shui. The current chapel was built between 1915 and 1923. The site is now used as a training campsite by the Catholic Scout Guild.

== Other features ==
- Several buildings of the former Ho Residence and the Ho Ancestral Hall, as well as the King Siu Sai Kui and Hau Fuk Mun in Pak Sha O are Grade I historic buildings.
- Pak Sha O Youth Hostel (白沙澳青年旅舍)
- King Siu Sai Kui and Hau Fuk Mun in nearby Pak Sha O Ha Yeung (白沙澳下洋) are Grade I historic buildings.
