= Bun Sha Pai =

Uninhabited island in Tai Po District, Hong Kong

Native name: 崩紗排
- Location within Hong Kong

Geography
- Coordinates: 22.459290°N 114.287485°E

Administration
- Hong Kong
- District: Tai Po

Demographics
- Population: 0

Bun Sha Pai (Chinese: 崩紗排) is a small uninhabited island in Tai Po District, Hong Kong. It is located south of Che Lei Pai, within Tolo Channel.

== Name ==
The name 'Bun Sha Pai' is derived from it being in the shape of a butterfly, which was known as "Bun Sha" in Chinese historically. Other names of the islet include 'Tung King Pai' and 'Flat Reef'.
