= Wu Chau (Tai Po District) =

Uninhabited island of Hong Kong

Coordinates: 22.425441°N 114.273032°E

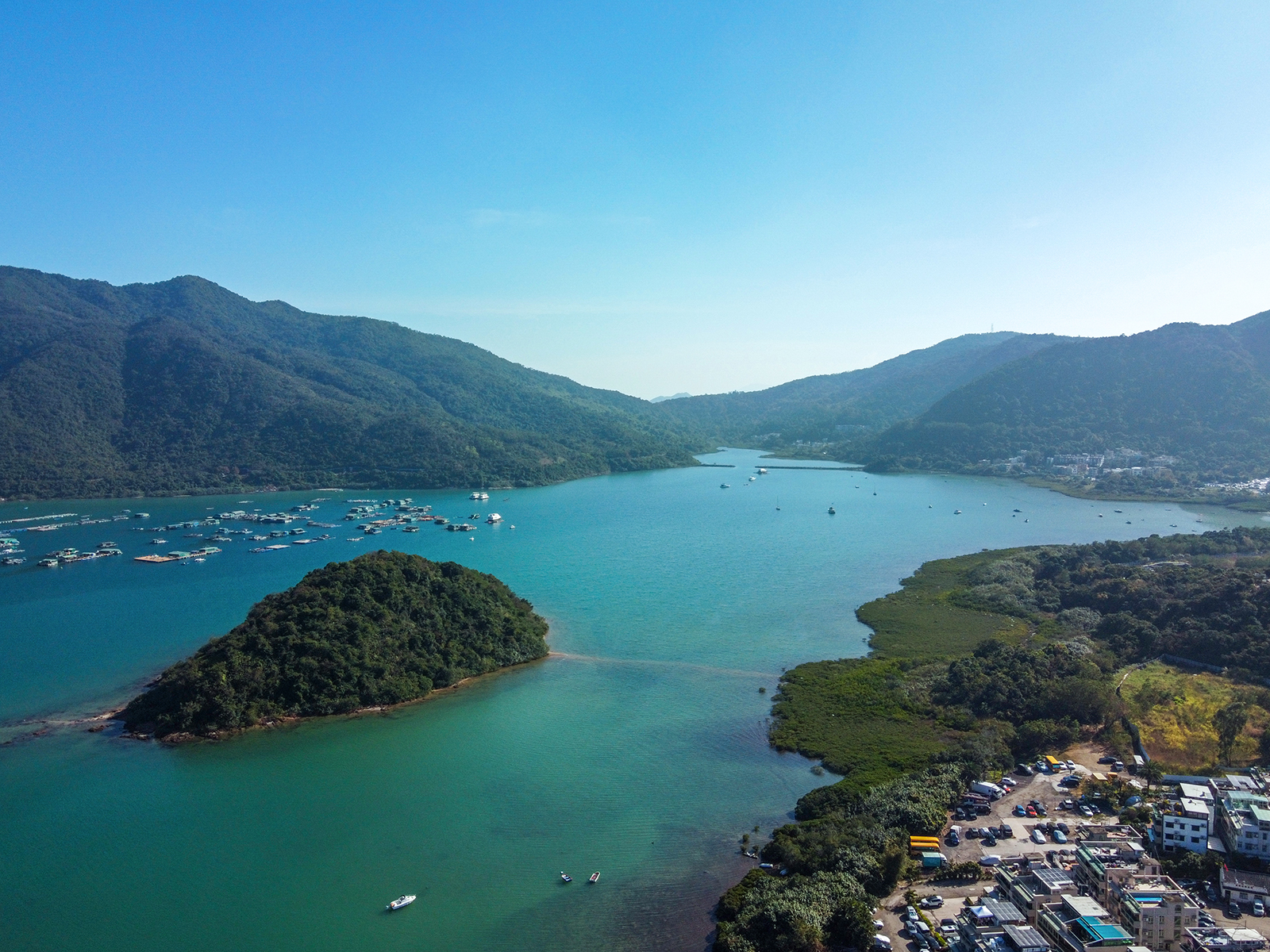
Wu Chau in Three Fathoms Cove. The village on the right is Tseng Tau. The Yung Shue O marine fish culture zone is visible on the left.

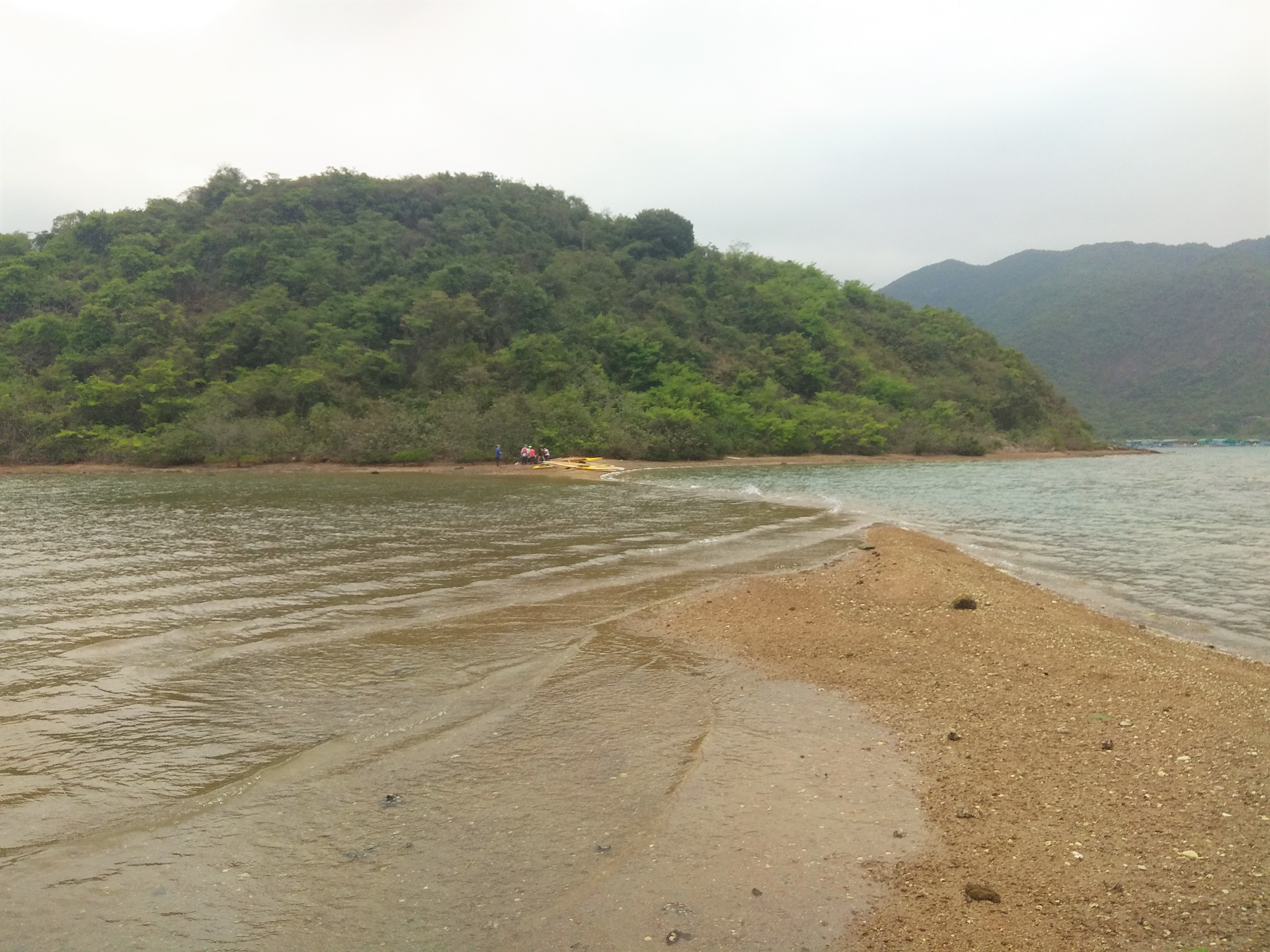
Wu Chau and its tombolo.

Wu Chau (Chinese: 烏洲) is an uninhabited island of Hong Kong, located in Three Fathoms Cove, in Tai Po District.

Wu Chau is connected to the mainland near Tseng Tau via a tombolo.

== See also ==
- List of islands and peninsulas of Hong Kong
