= Wong Chuk Kok Tsui =

Cape in Wong Chuk Kok Peninsula, New Territories, Hong Kong

Coordinates: 22°30′28.85″N 114°20′4.67″E

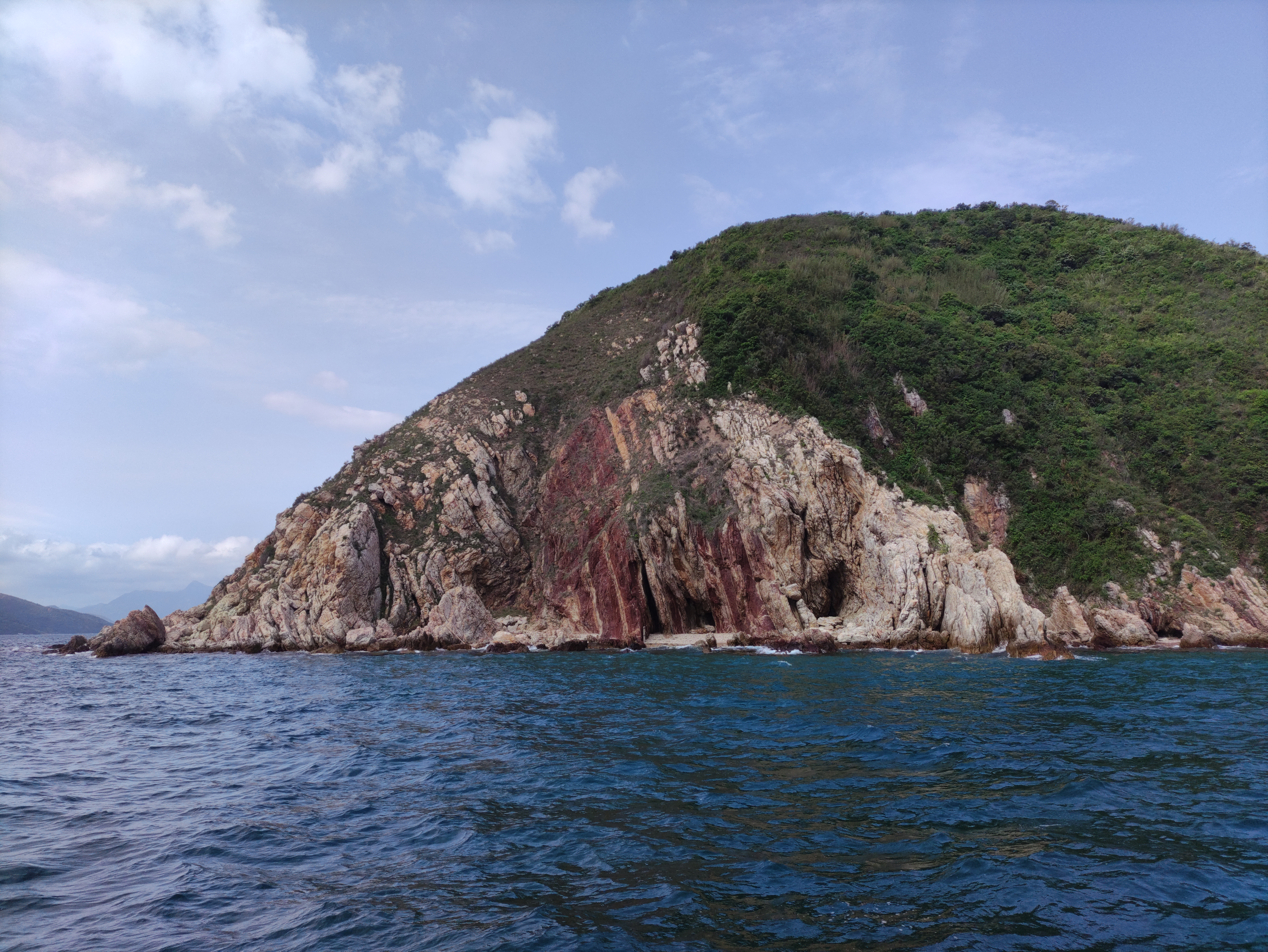
Wong Chuk Kok Tsui in 2022

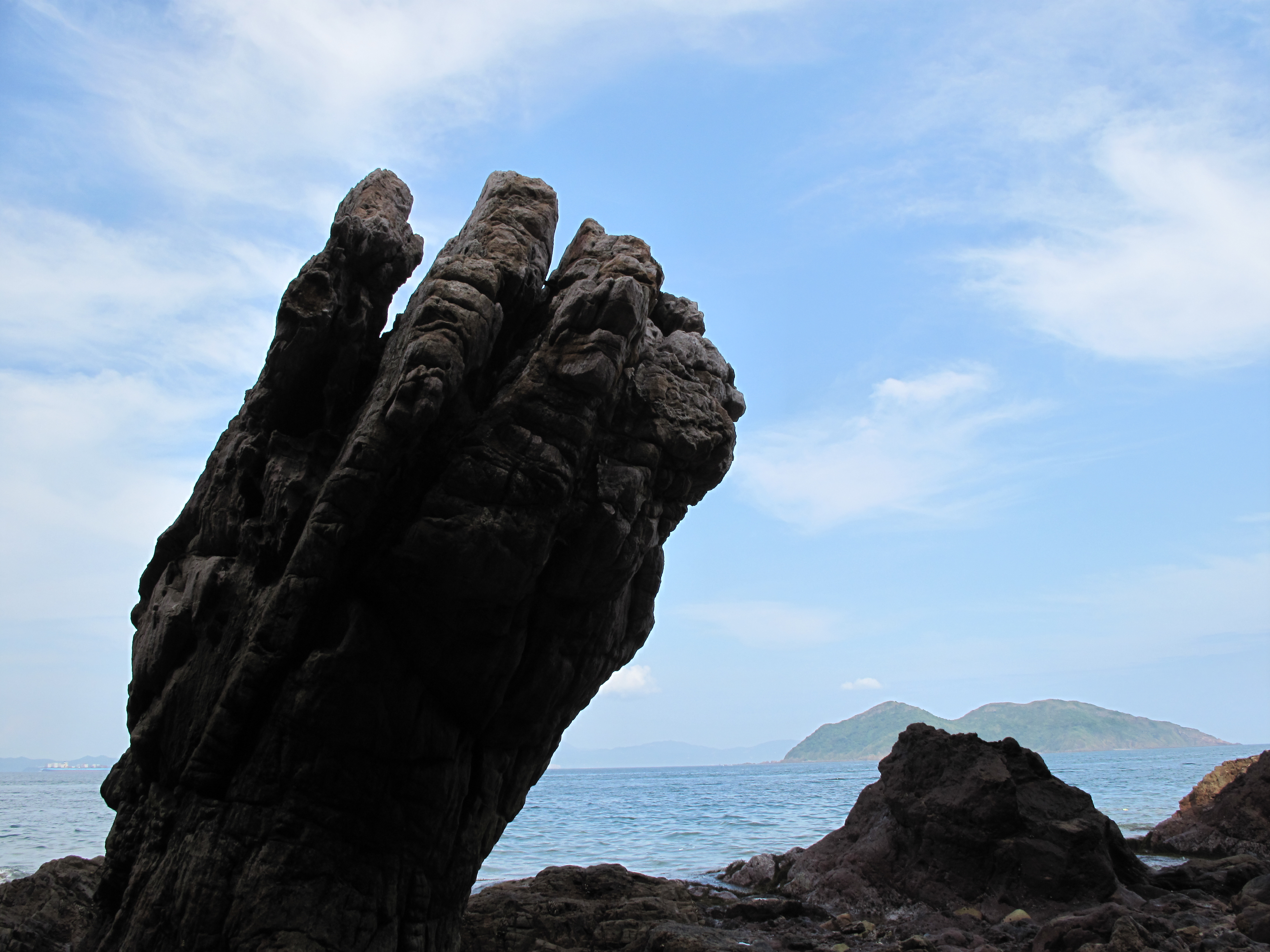
Devil's Fist at Wong Chuk Kok Tsui. The island visible in the background is Port Island (Chek Chau)

Wong Chuk Kok Tsui (Chinese: 黃竹角咀; lit. 'Cape of the Yellow Bamboo Point'), formerly known as Bluff Head, is a cape in north east New Territories, Hong Kong. Administratively, it is part of North District and Tai Po District.

== Geography ==
Wong Chuk Kok Tsui separates North Channel, the northern part of Tolo Channel, to its south and Wong Chuk Kok Hoi to its north. It is reputed as the extremity of north east New Territories, due to its remoteness for access on land.

== Conservation ==
It is part of Plover Cove Country Park and the Hong Kong National Geopark. It holds some of the oldest rocks in Hong Kong.
