= Tseng Tau =

Village in Hong Kong

Coordinates: 22.427539°N 114.269473°E

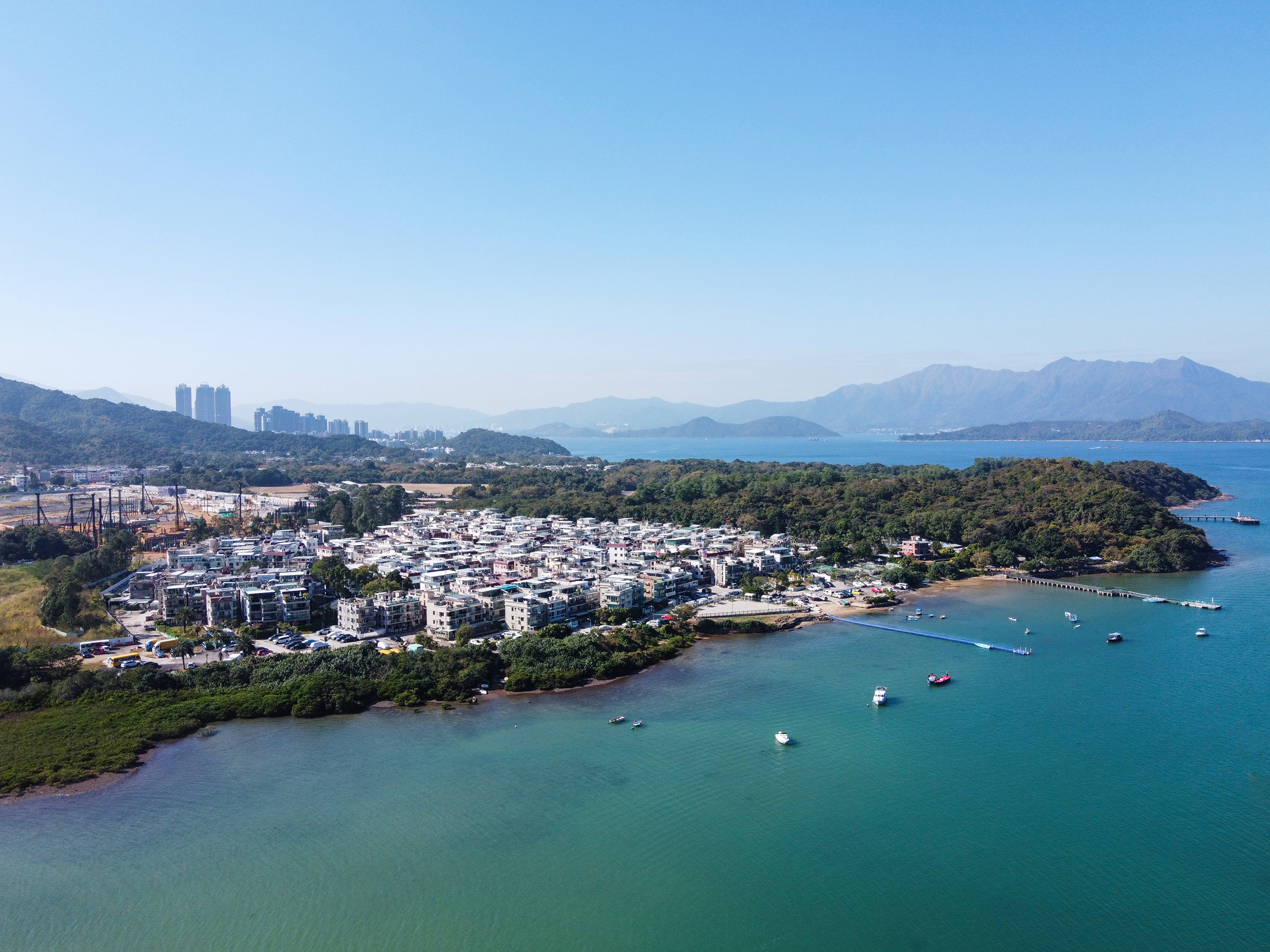
Tseng Tau along Three Fathoms Cove.

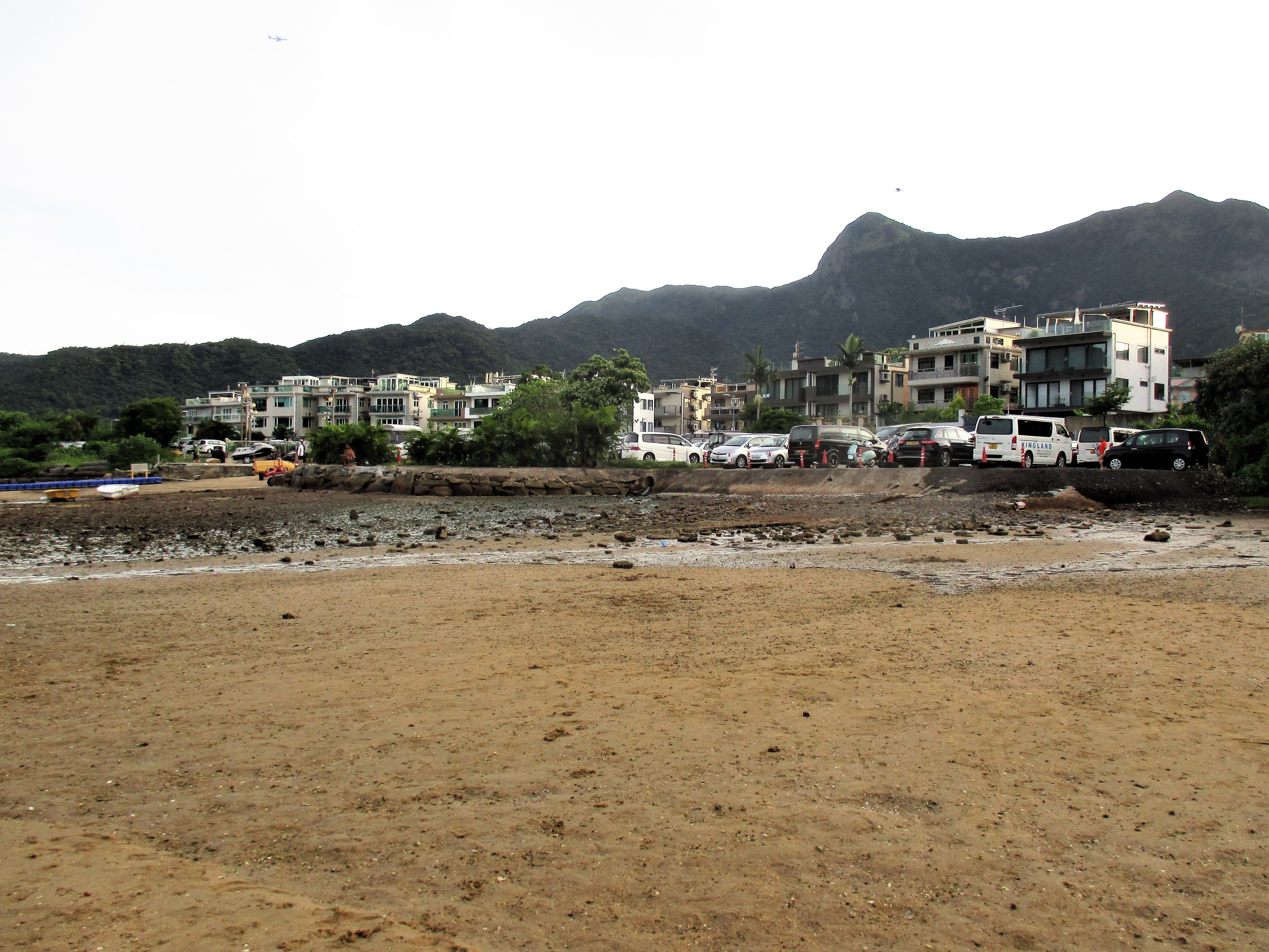
Tseng Tau viewed from the beach along Three Fathoms Cove. Ma On Shan is visible in the background.

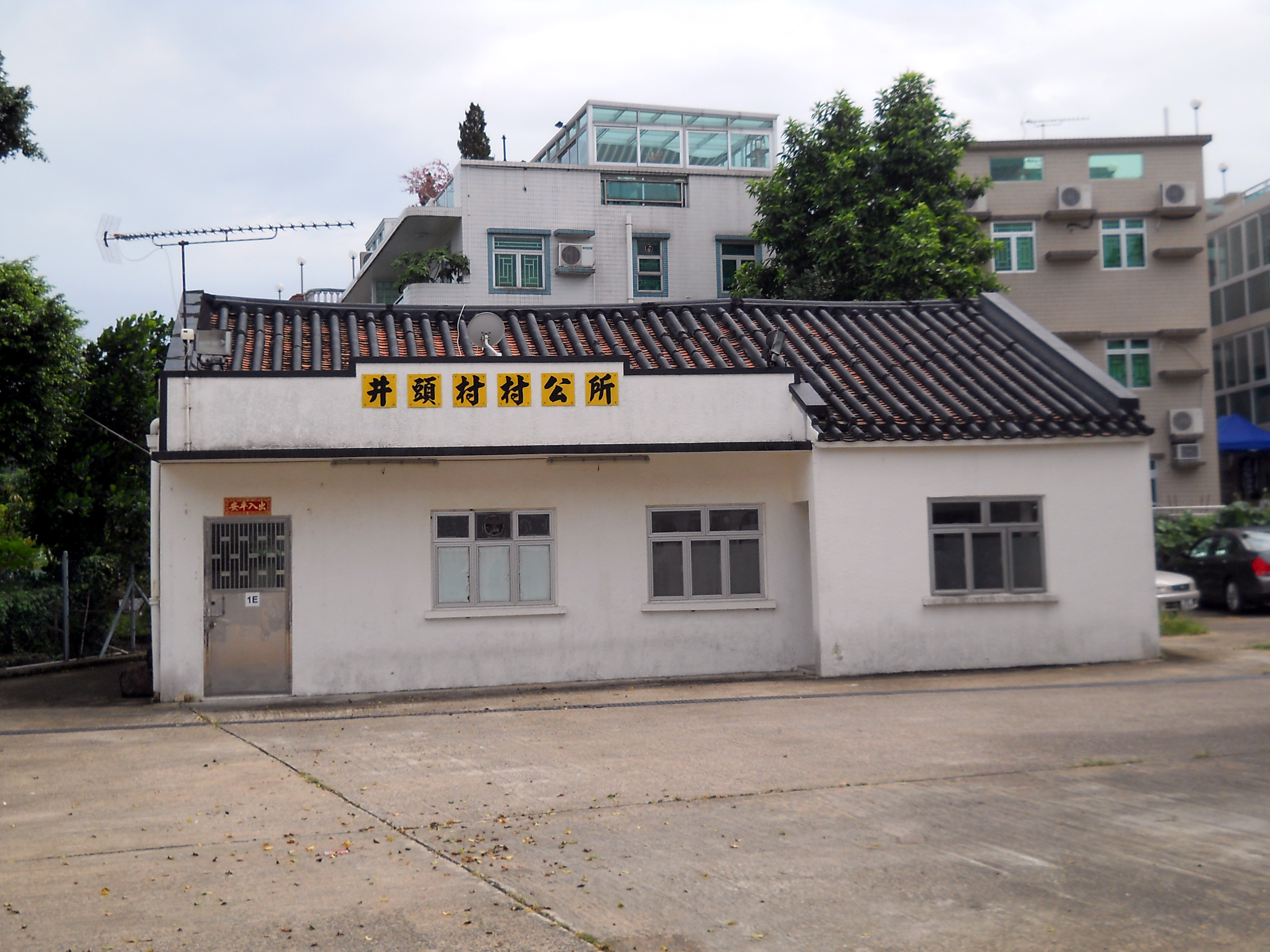
Former Yat Sun School (日新學校), housing the Tseng Tau Village Office (井頭村村公所).

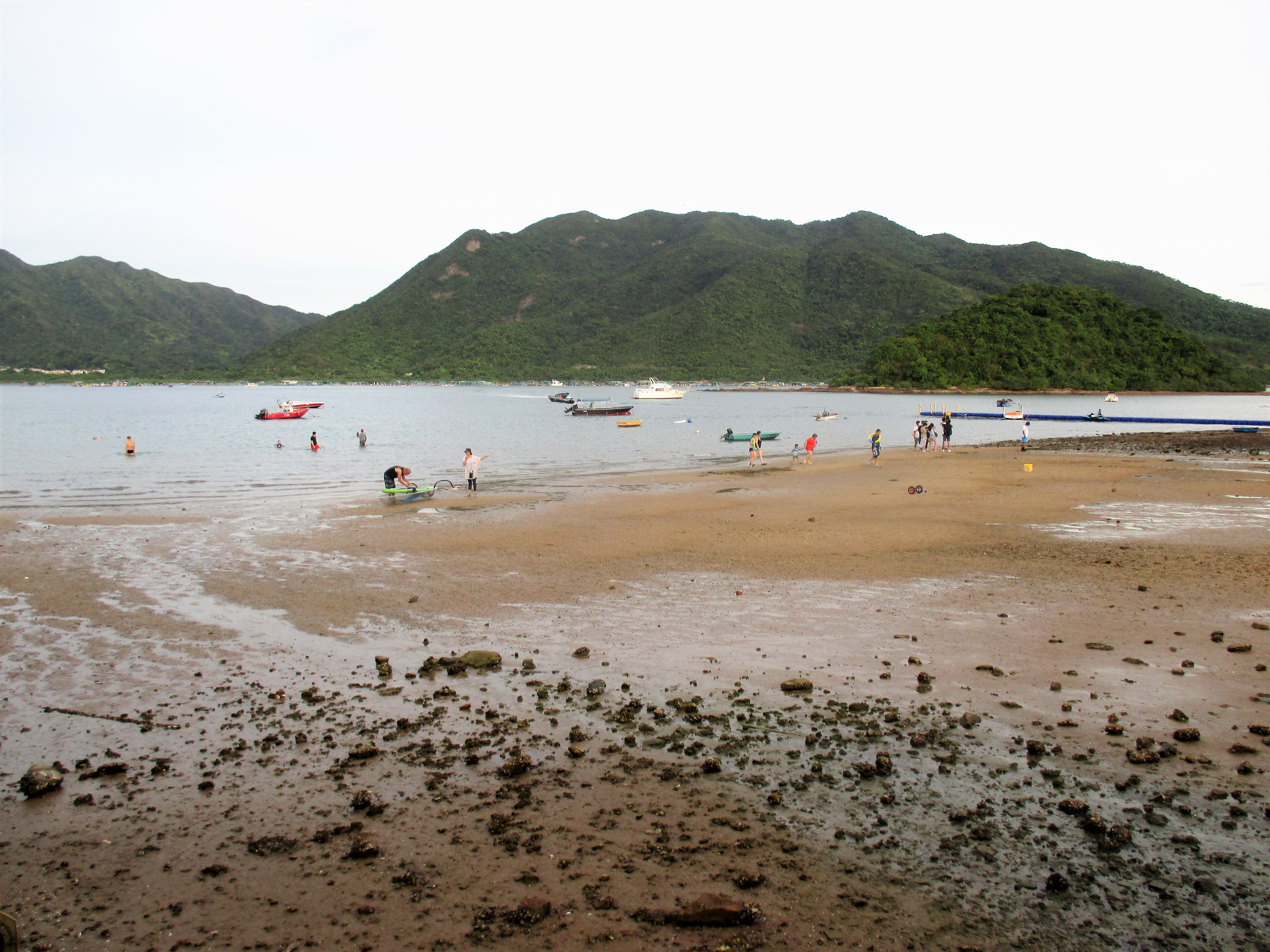
Three Fathoms Cove viewed from the beach at Tseng Tau.

Tseng Tau (Chinese: 井頭) is a village of in the Shap Sze Heung area of Sai Kung North, in Tai Po District, Hong Kong, located near the shore of Three Fathoms Cove.

== Administration ==
Tseng Tau is a recognized village under the New Territories Small House Policy.

== History ==
The Shap Sze Heung Tsung Tsin Church (十四鄉崇真堂) of the Tsung Tsin Mission of Hong Kong was initially located in the Yat Sun School (日新學校) of Tseng Tau starting from 1954. A dedicated church building was later built in Nga Yiu Tau in 1960. The building is now vacant.

== Conservation ==
Tseng Tau Coast, a coastal area of 1 km in length located north of the village and facing Three Fathom Cove, covering an area of 4.3 hectares, was designated as a Site of Special Scientific Interest in 1994.

== See also ==
- Wu Chau
