= Nga Yiu Tau, Tai Po District =

Village in Hong Kong

Coordinates: 22.422164°N 114.267815°E

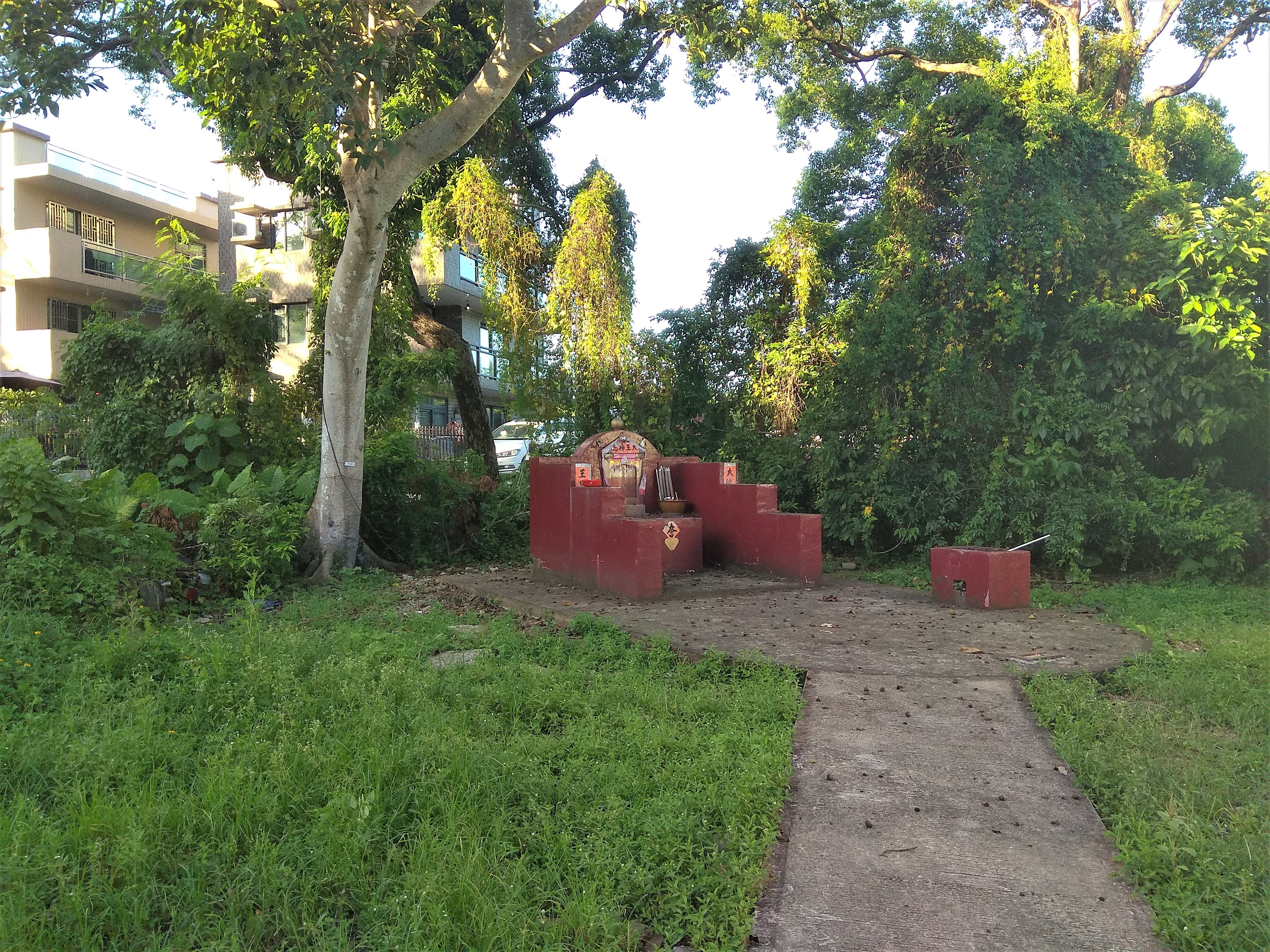
Earth God shrine in Nga Yiu Tau, Tai Po District.

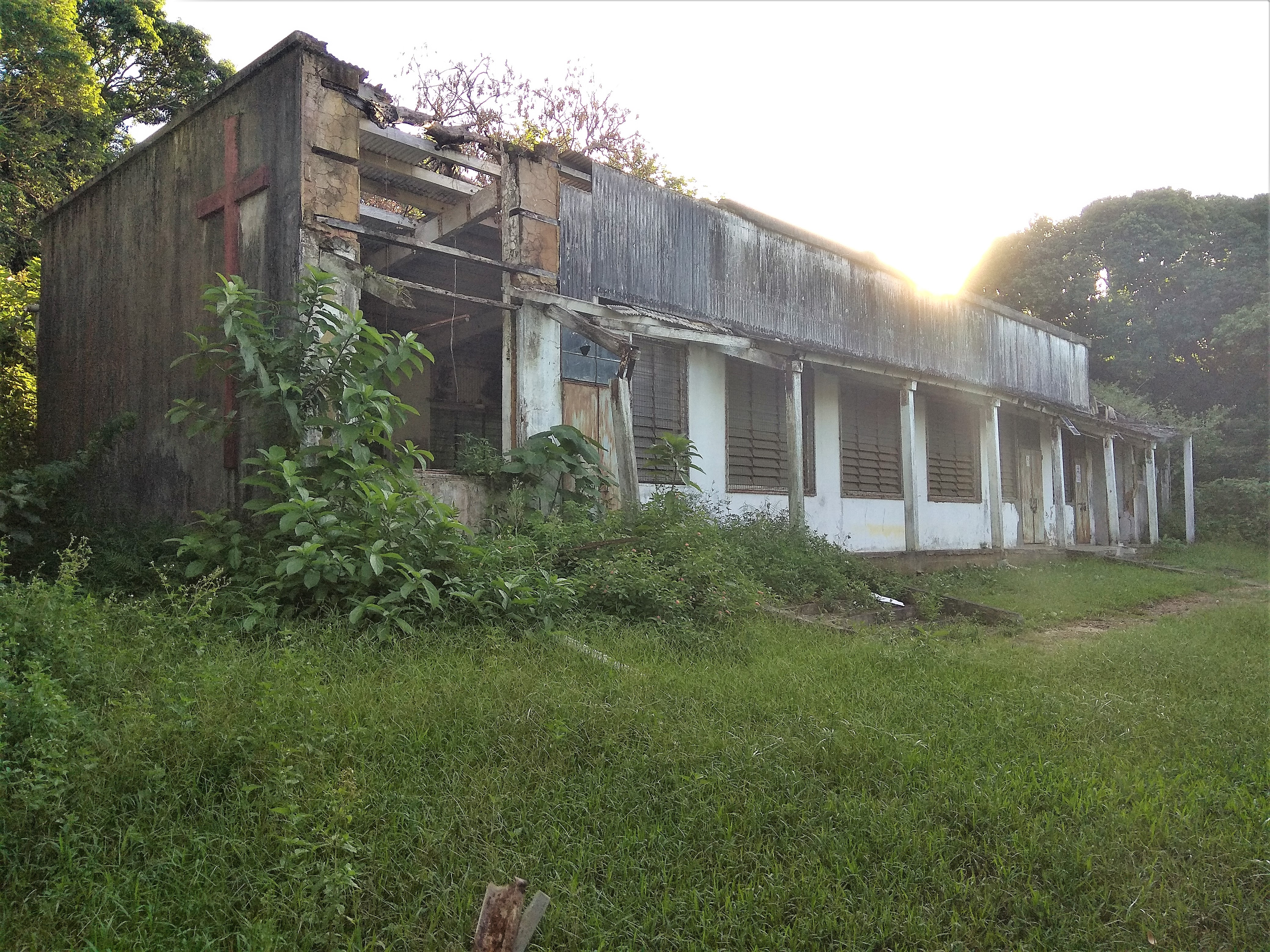
Shap Sze Heung Tsung Tsin Church in 2020.

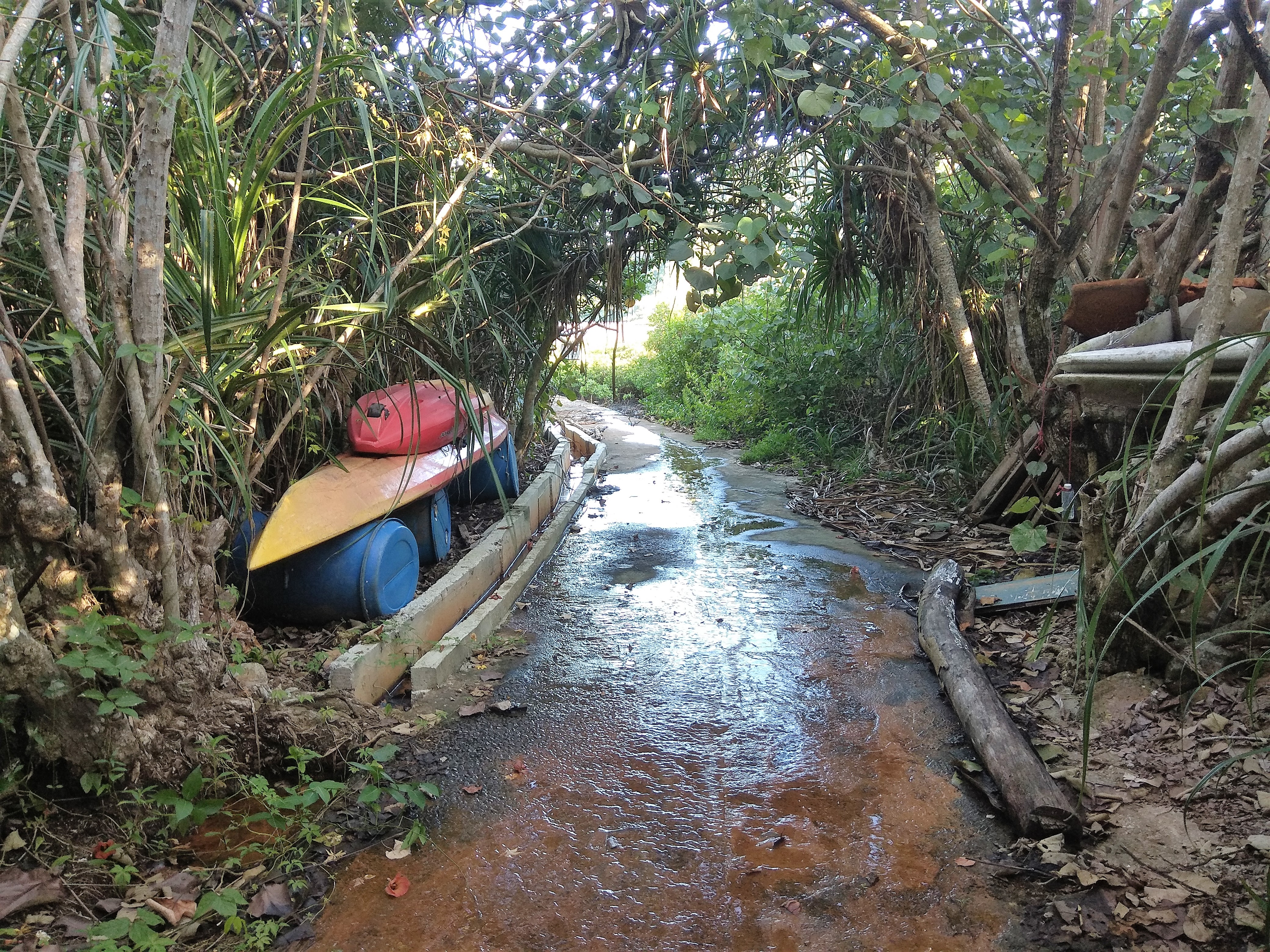
Path leading to the seashore of Three Fathoms Cove at Nga Yiu Tau, Tai Po District.

Nga Yiu Tau (Chinese: 瓦窰頭) is a village of in the Shap Sze Heung area of Sai Kung North, in Tai Po District, Hong Kong, located near the shore of Three Fathoms Cove.

== Features ==
The Shap Sze Heung Tsung Tsin Church (十四鄉崇真堂) of the Tsung Tsin Mission of Hong Kong was built in Nga Yiu Tau in 1960. It had been initially located in the Yat Sun School (日新學校) in nearby Tseng Tau since 1954. The building is now vacant.
