= Lai Chi Chong =

Village and area in Hong Kong

Coordinates: 22.451412°N 114.300959°E

- Traditional Chinese: 荔枝莊
- Simplified Chinese: 荔枝庄
Transcriptions
Standard Mandarin
- Hanyu Pinyin: Lìzhī Zhuāng
Yue: Cantonese
- Jyutping: lai6 zi1 zong1

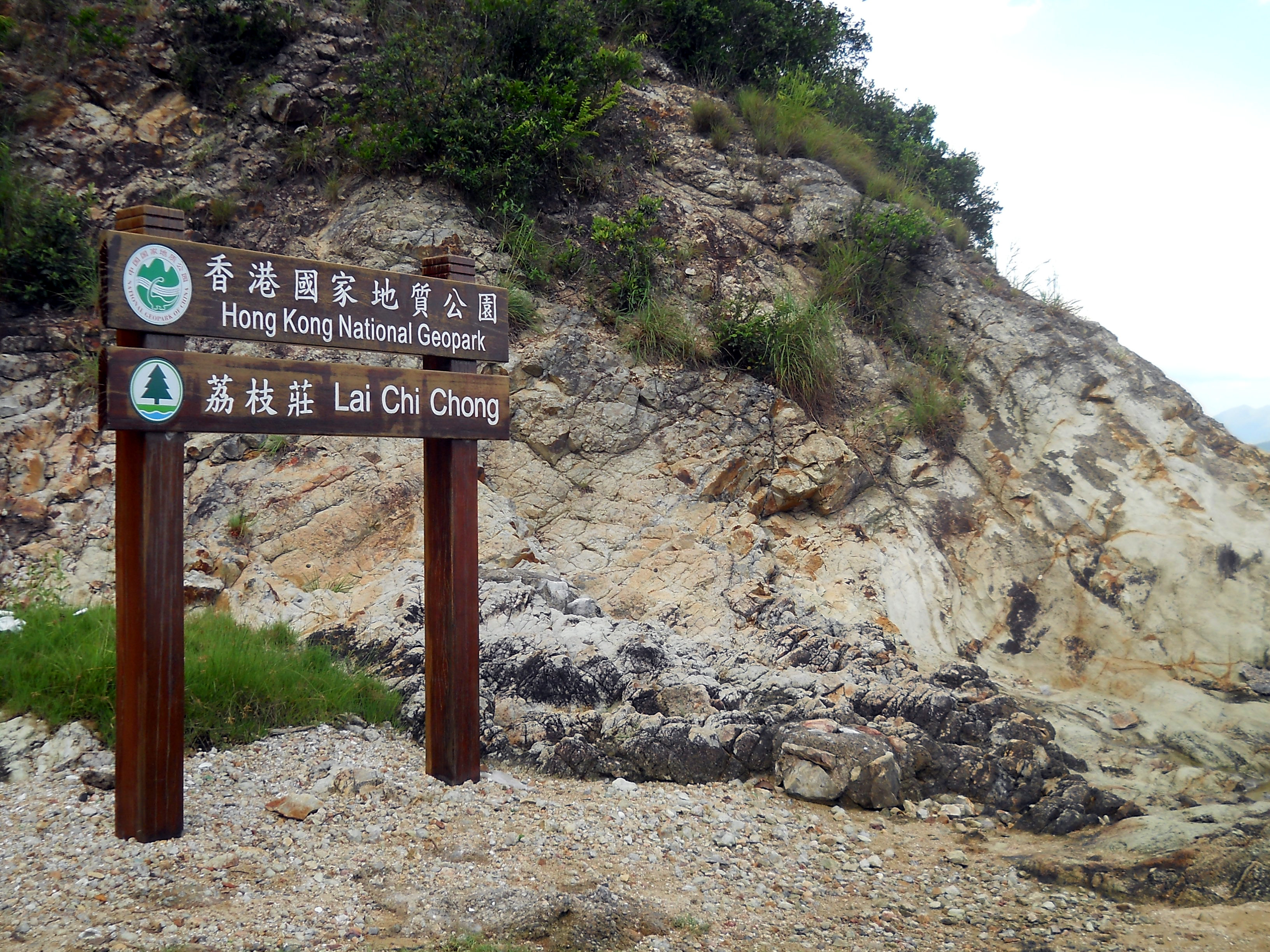
Hong Kong National Geopark sign in Lai Chi Chong.

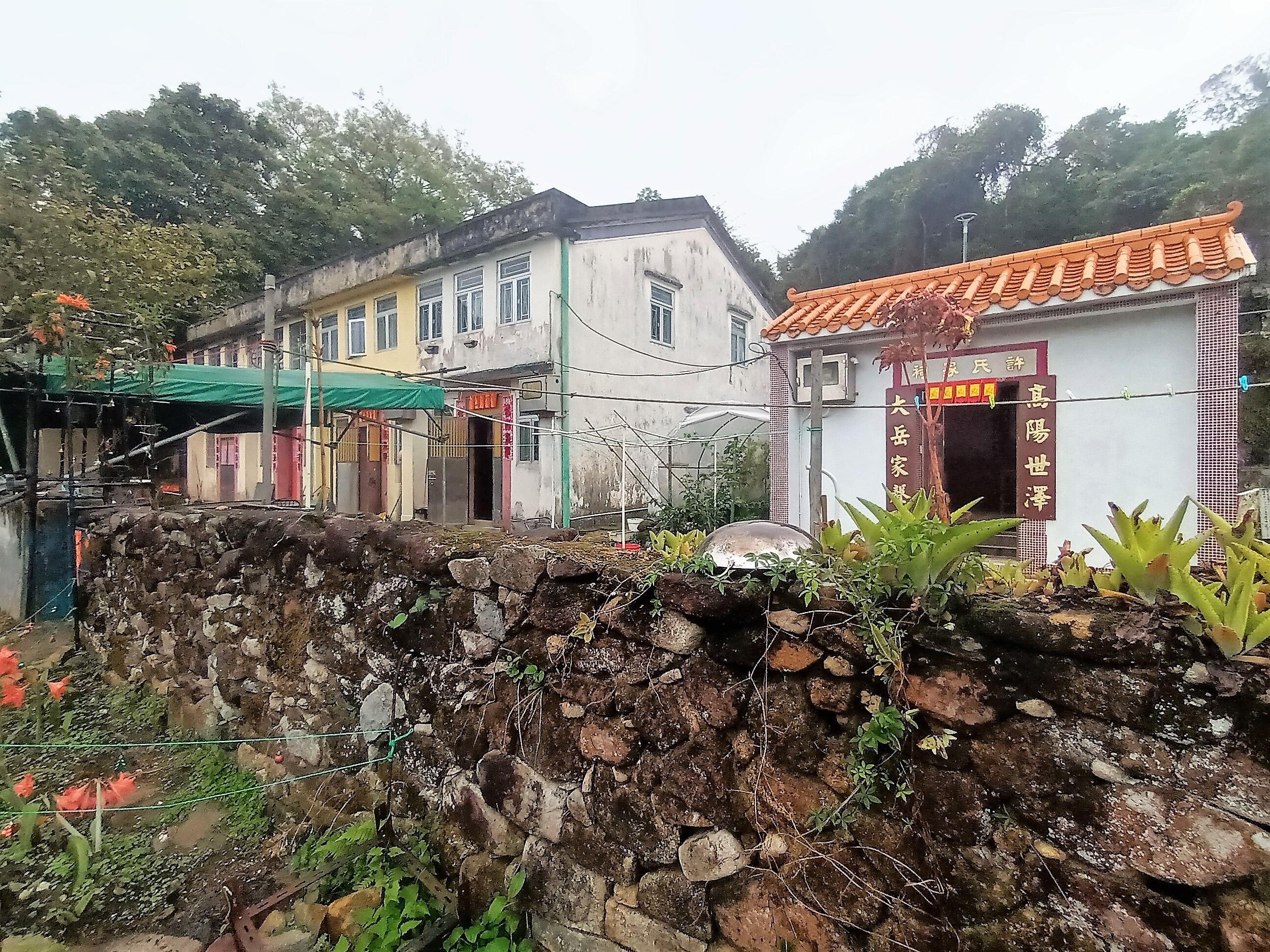
Residential houses and Hui (許) Ancestral Hall in Lai Chi Chong.

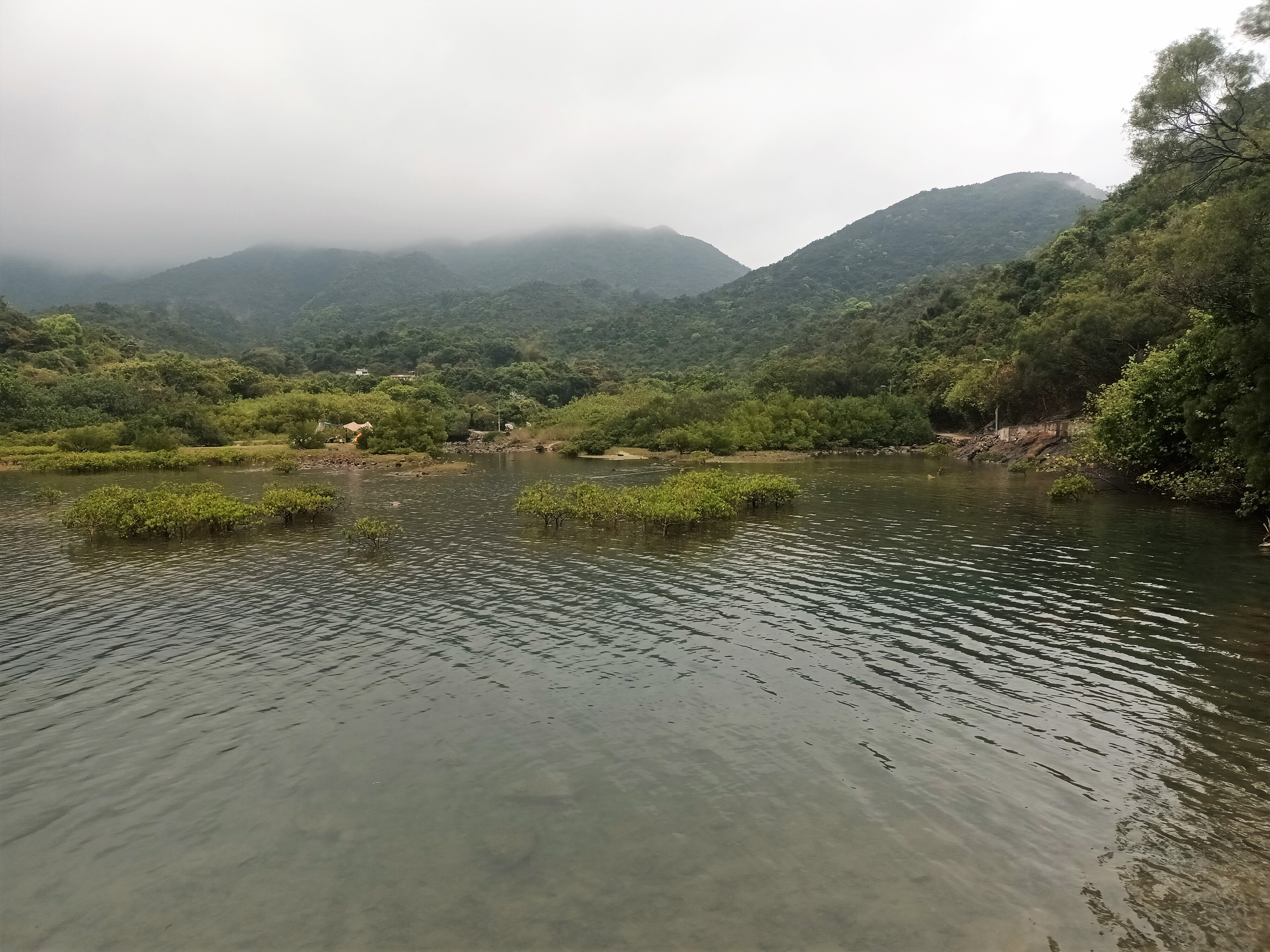
Mangroves at Lai Chi Chong.

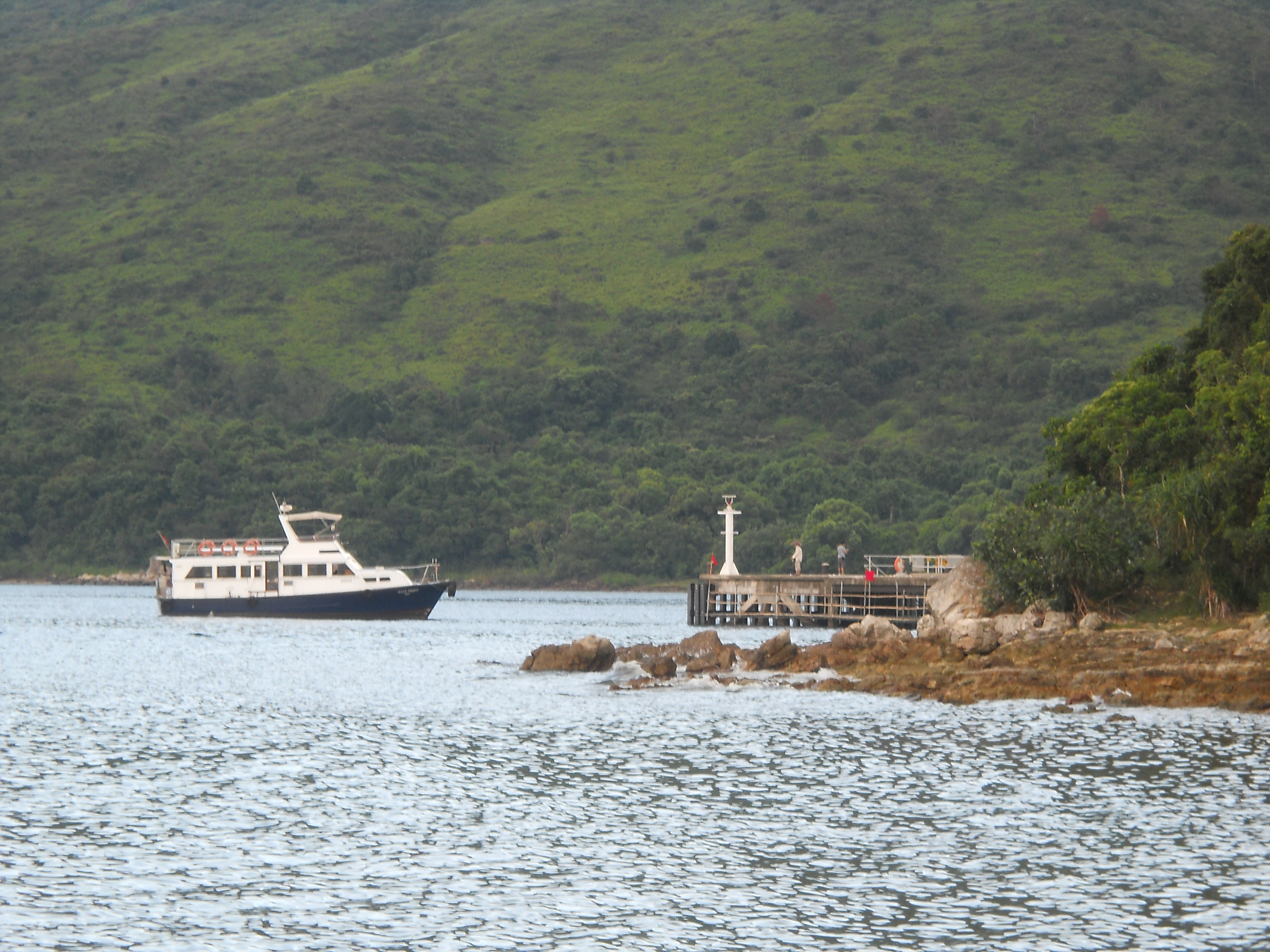
Lai Chi Chong ferry pier.

Lai Chi Chong (Chinese: 荔枝莊) is a village and an area of Hong Kong, located on the southeastern shore of Tolo Channel, and on the northern shore of the Sai Kung Peninsula, in the Eastern New Territories. Administratively, it is part of Tai Po District.

== Administration ==
Lai Chi Chong is a recognized village under the New Territories Small House Policy.

== History ==
It has been reported that the villages of Sham Chung, Lai Chi Chong and Pak Sha O had historically close social ties.

== Features ==
The coast of Lai Chi Chong near Lai Chi Chong Pier is the site the "Lai Chi Chong Formation", a set of Early Cretaceous volcaniclastic sedimentary rock strata.

The Caritas Jockey Club Siu Tong holiday camp is located in Lai Chi Chong.

== Conservation ==
Lai Chi Chong is located within Sai Kung West Country Park, that was established in 1978.

Lai Chi Chong has been designated as a Site of Special Scientific Interest since 1985, because of its geological interest. The Lai Chi Chong Formation is part of the Hong Kong UNESCO Global Geopark, that was inaugurated in 2009.

== Access ==
Lai Chi Chong is served by a scheduled kai-to ferry service, along the route Ma Liu Shui – Sham Chung – Lai Chi Chong – Tap Mun – Ko Lau Wan – Chek Keng – Wong Shek Pier. The Lai Chi Chong Pier was built in 1962.

Lai Chi Chong can also be accessed via a 3.5 km hiking path from Pak Sha O.
