= Che Lei Pai =

Islet in Hong Kong

Coordinates: 22.46375°N 114.290798°E

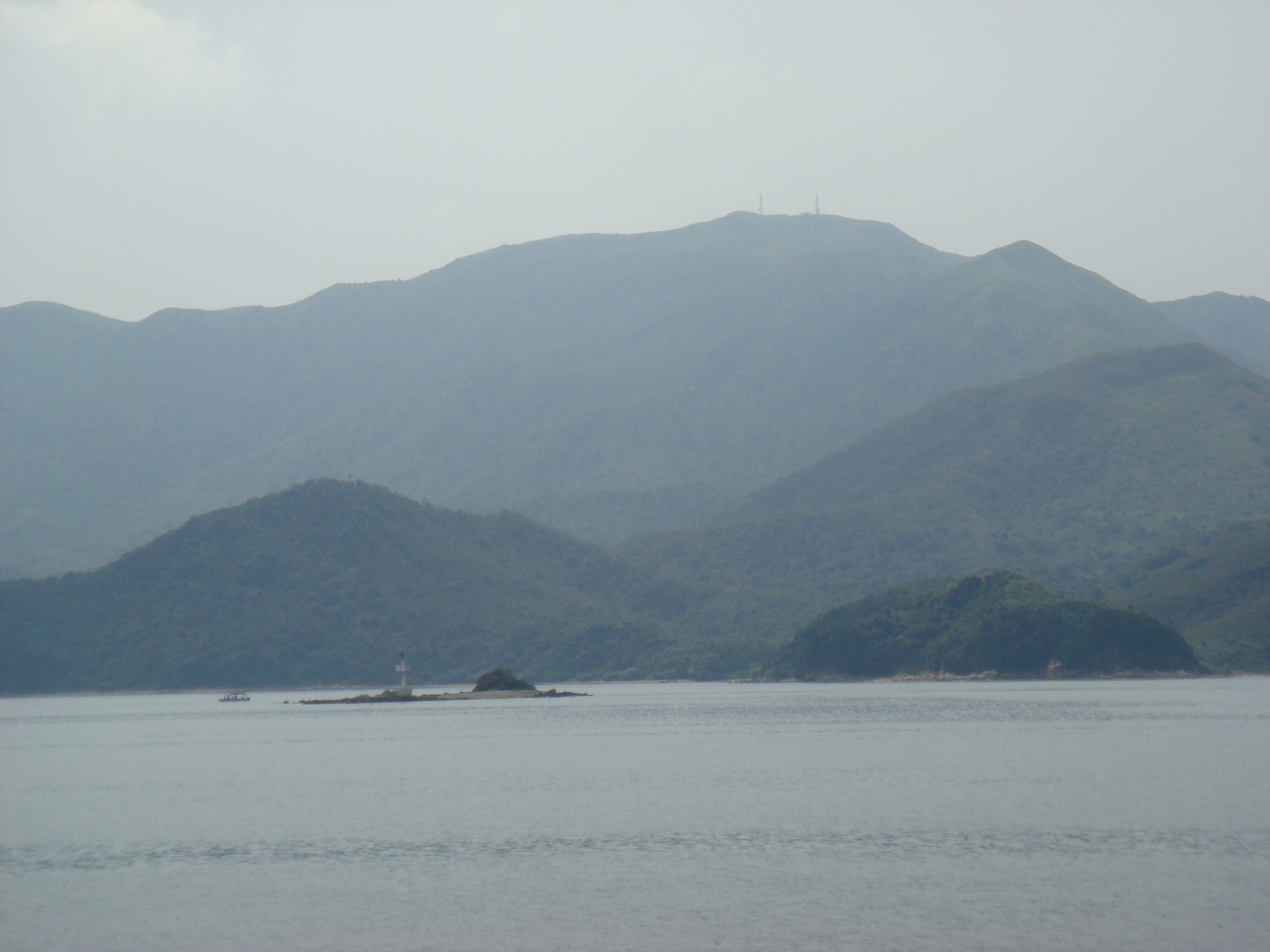
View of Che Lei Pai within Tolo Channel. The headland on the right is Pak Kok Chai (白角仔). The mountain at the back, with a radio station at its top, is Shek Uk Shan.

Che Lei Pai (Chinese: 扯𢃇排), also known as Knob Reef, is an islet in Tolo Channel in the northeastern New Territories of Hong Kong. The island is north of Pak Kok Chai (白角仔) and south of Fu Tau Sha. It is under the administration of the Tai Po District.

Investigations into pollution levels in the waters around Hong Kong has found that Che Lei Pai has the greater ecosystem multifunctionality and health as compared to other, nearby bodies of water.
