= Yung Shue O =

Coordinates: 22.42716°N 114.293238°E

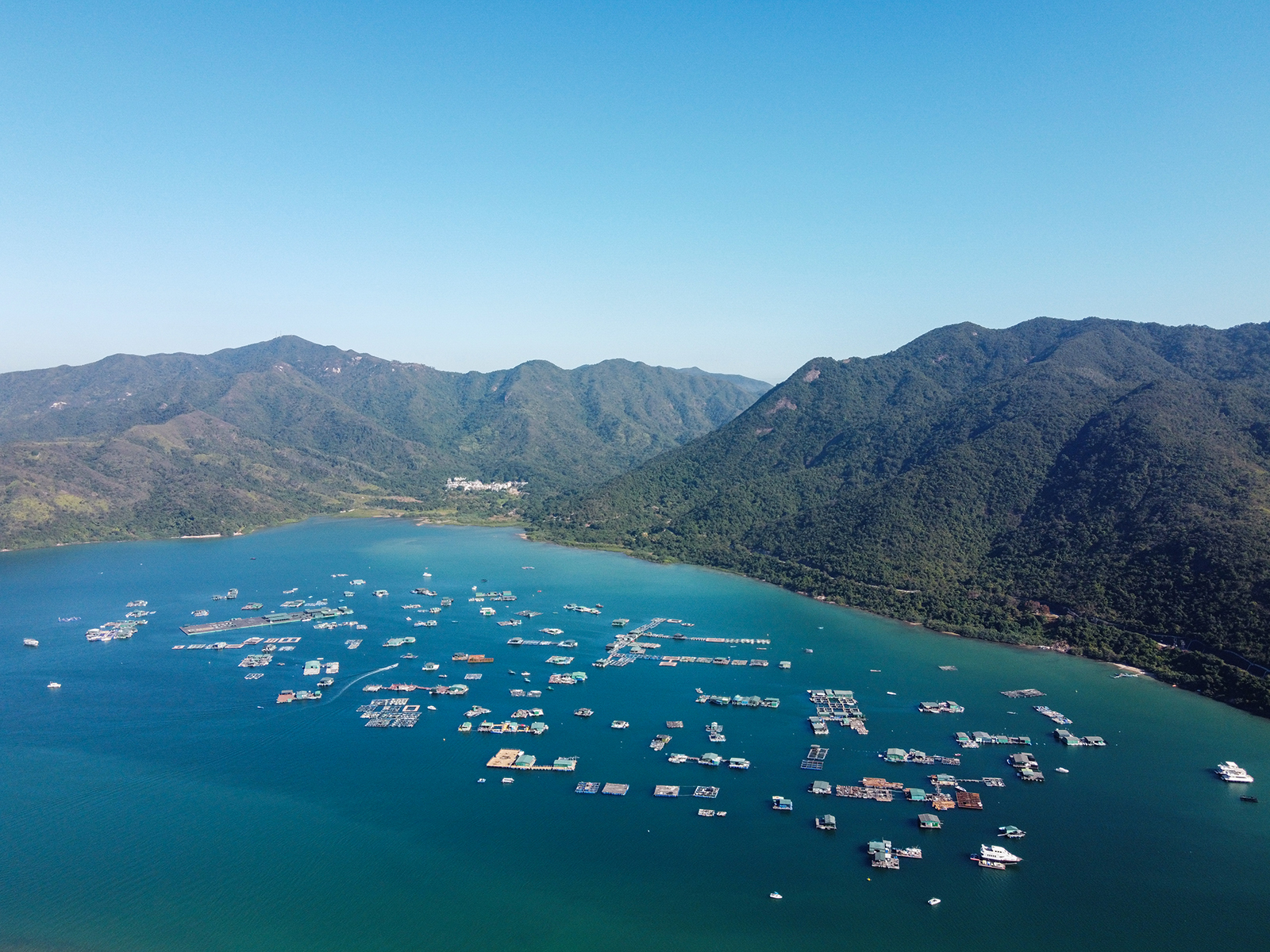
Distant view of Yung Shue O across Three Fathoms Cove. The marine fish culture zone is visible in the foreground.

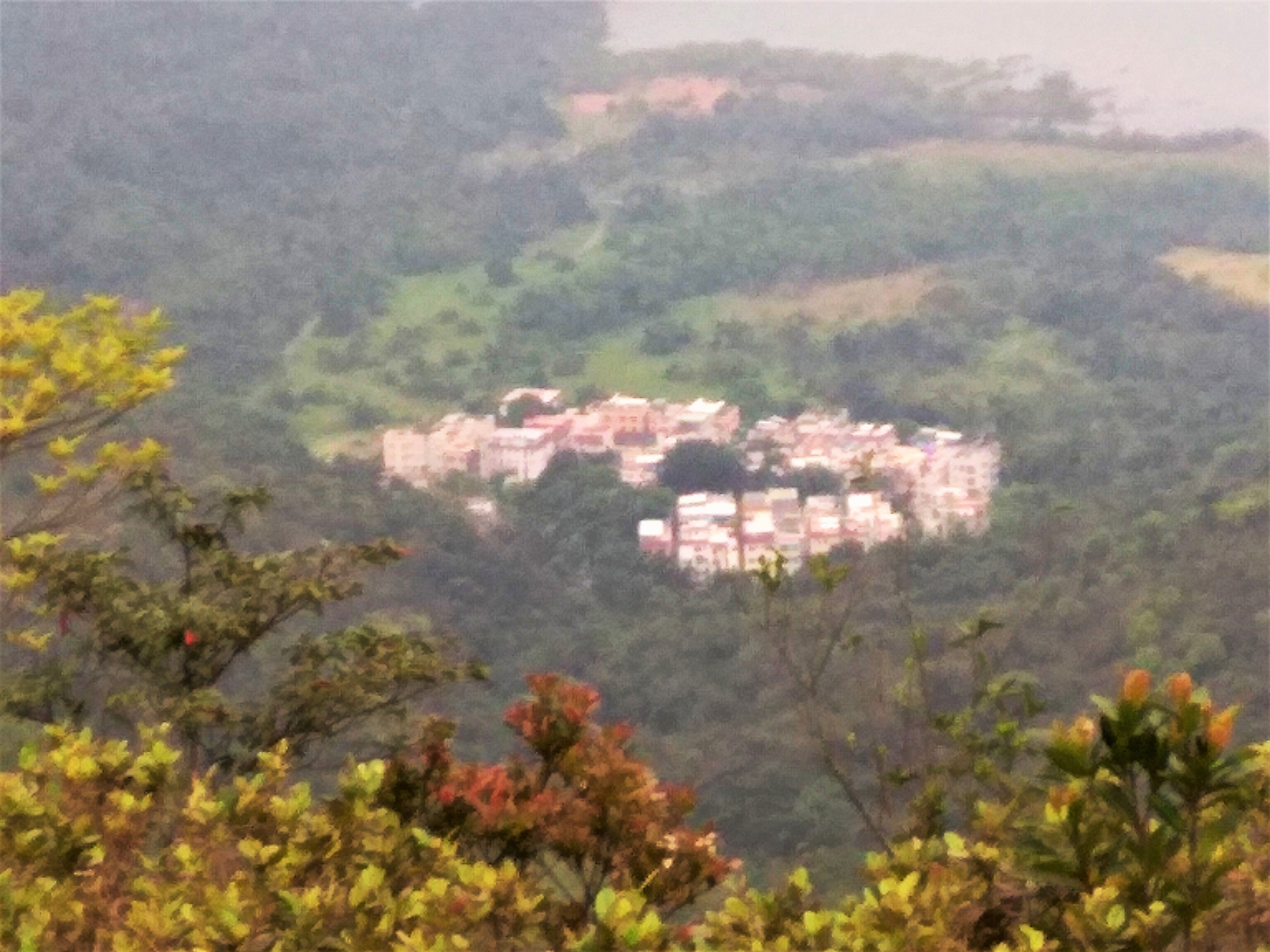
Distant view of Yung Shue O.

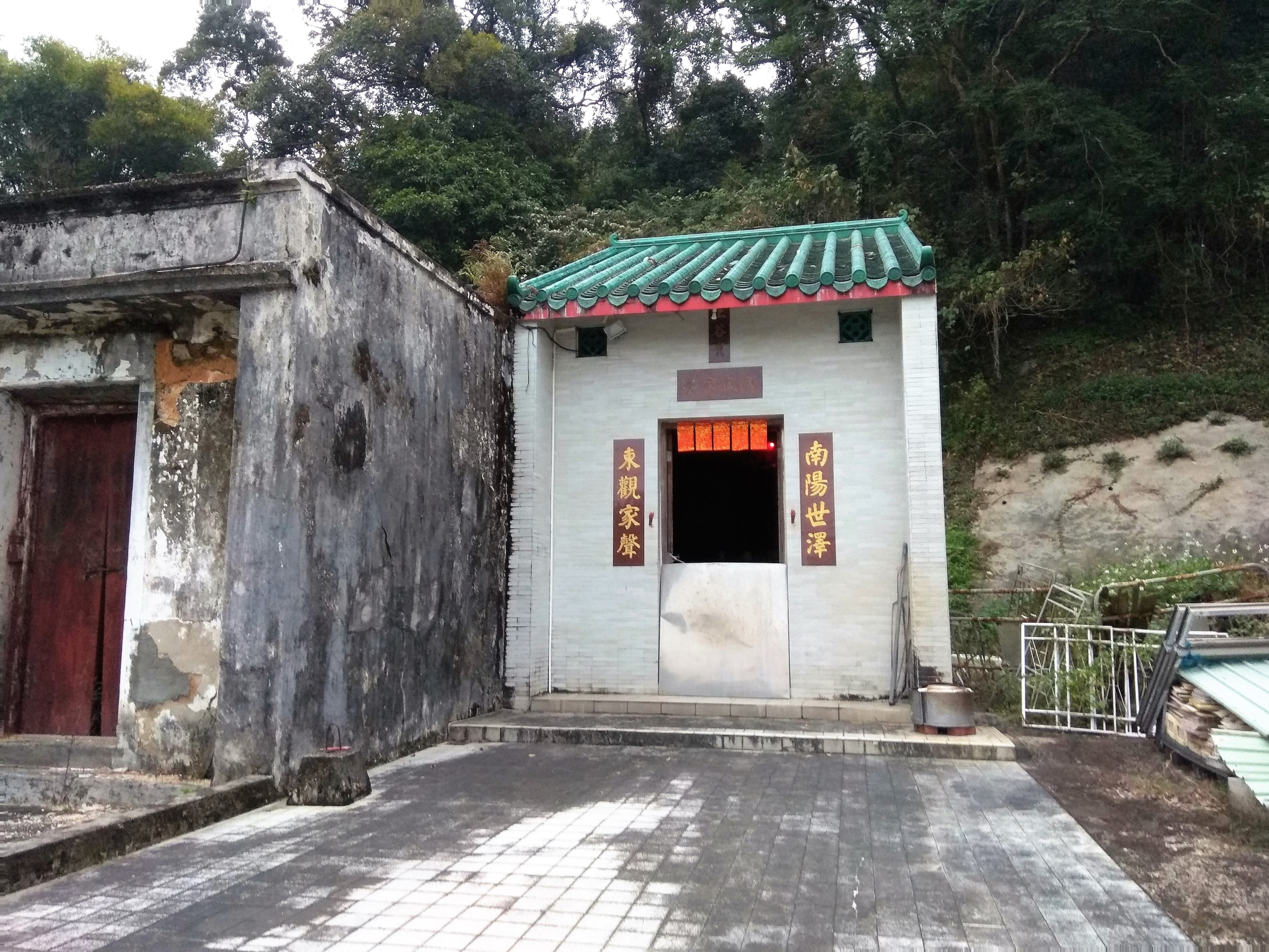
Ancestral hall in Yung Shue O.

Yung Shue O (Chinese: 榕樹澳) is a village of Sai Kung North, in Tai Po District, Hong Kong, located near the shore of Three Fathoms Cove.

== Administration ==
Fat Tau Chau is a recognized village under the New Territories Small House Policy.

== Features ==
A section of Three Fathoms Cove located offshore of Yung Shue O is one of the 26 designated marine fish culture zones in Hong Kong.

== Transport ==
A road connects Yung Shue O to Sai Sha Road.

A hiking path connects Yung Shue O to Sham Chung.
