= Chek Chau =

Island in Hong Kong New Territories

Native name: 赤洲
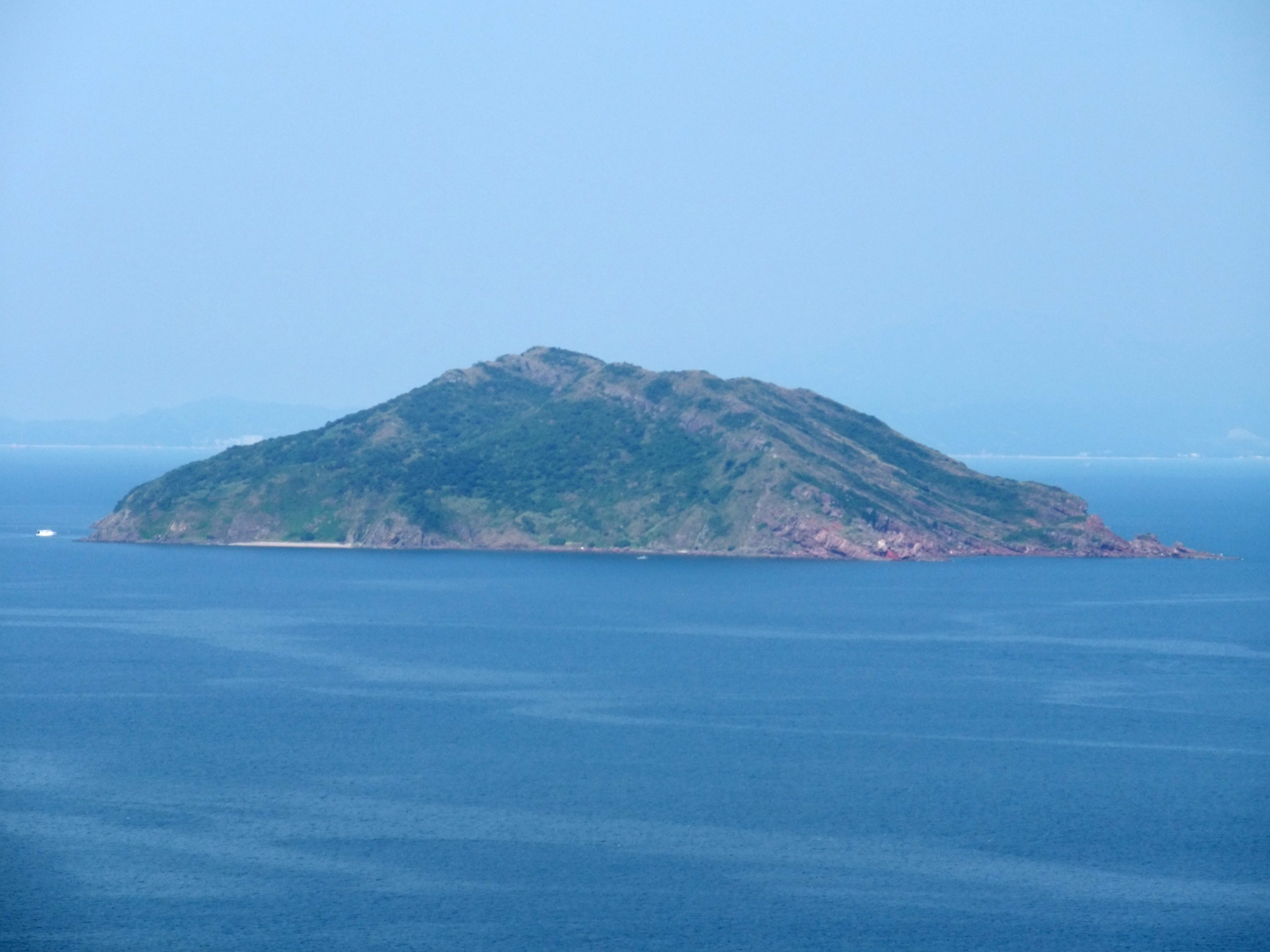
- Port Island viewed from Wan Tsai.

- Location within Hong Kong

Geography
- Coordinates: 22.501094°N 114.358975°E

Administration
- Hong Kong
- Districts: Tai Po District

Demographics
- Population: 0

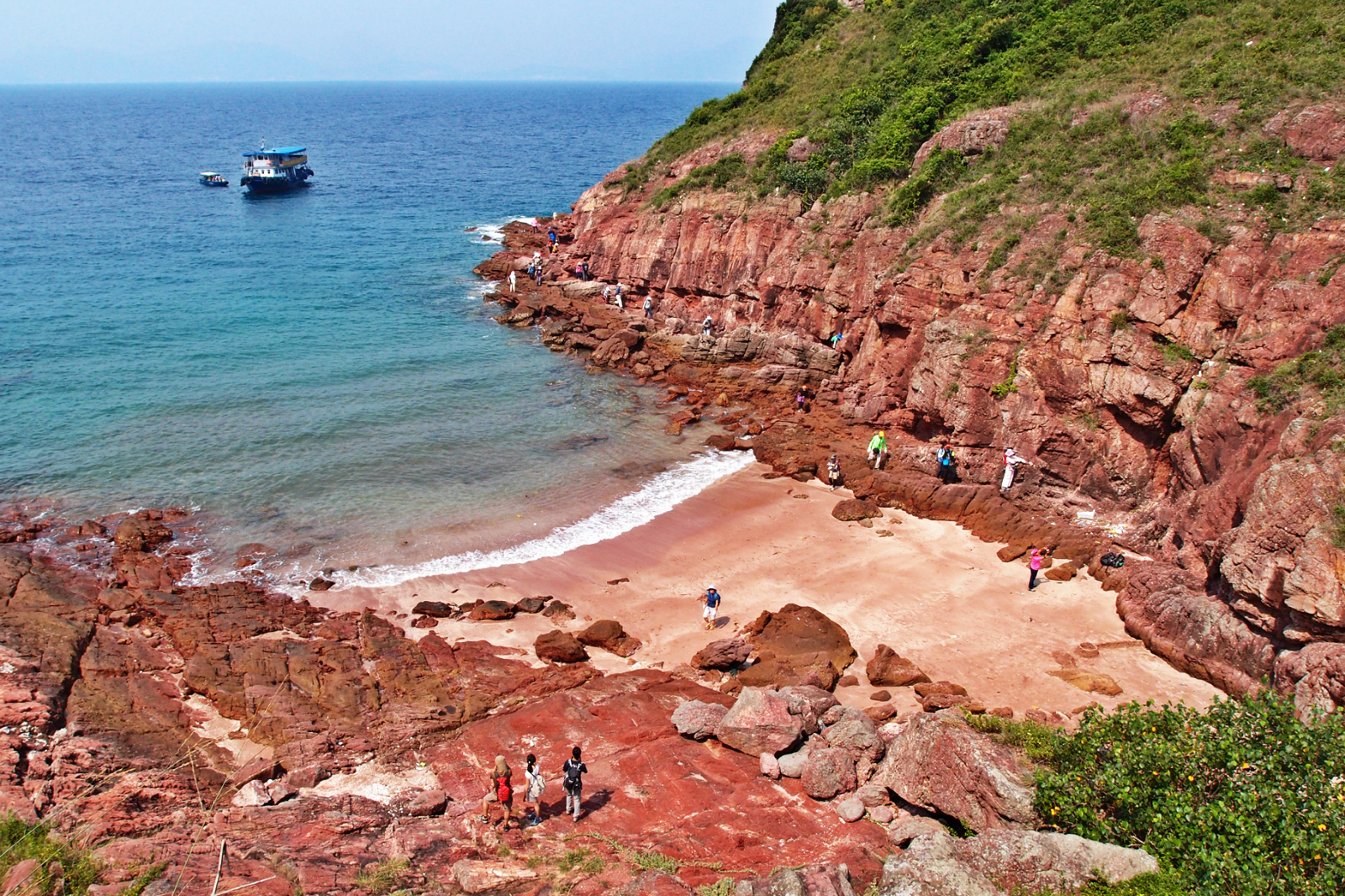
Port Island

Port Island or Chek Chau (Chinese: 赤洲) (cek3 zau1) is an island of Hong Kong under the administration of Tai Po District. It is located in Tolo Channel, in the northeastern New Territories. Its Chinese name literally means red island; after the sedimentary rocks rich in iron that form this island.

== Dinosaur fossils discovery ==
On October 23, 2024, the Development Bureau announced that experts discovered dinosaur skeletons fossils in Chek Chau, which was the first time dinosaur fossils were discovered in Hong Kong. According to expert estimates, the fossil belongs to the Cretaceous period, about 145 million to 66 million years ago; the dinosaur may have been buried under sand and gravel after death, then washed out of the surface by floods, and then buried again until its fossilized form was discovered.

The Agriculture, Fisheries and Conservation Department later admitted that the fossils were discovered back in 2013 but the department has to prioritize other work and so the fossils were stuck in identification for 11 years.

== Conservation ==
Port Island has been designated as a Site of Special Scientific Interest since 1979 because of its ornithological interest.

== See also ==
- Hong Kong National Geopark
- List of islands and peninsulas of Hong Kong
