= Tolo Channel =

Channel in Hong Kong

Coordinates: 22°28′47″N 114°18′36″E

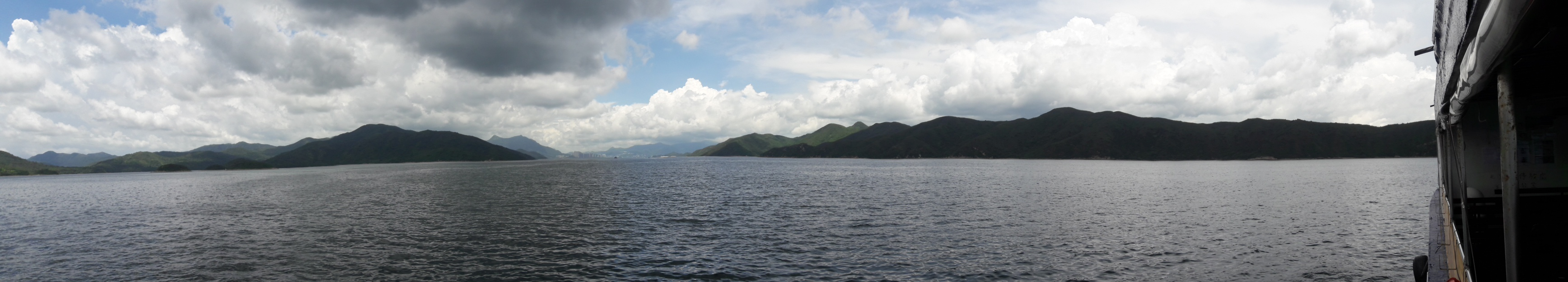
Tolo Channel towards Sha Tin, Hong Kong

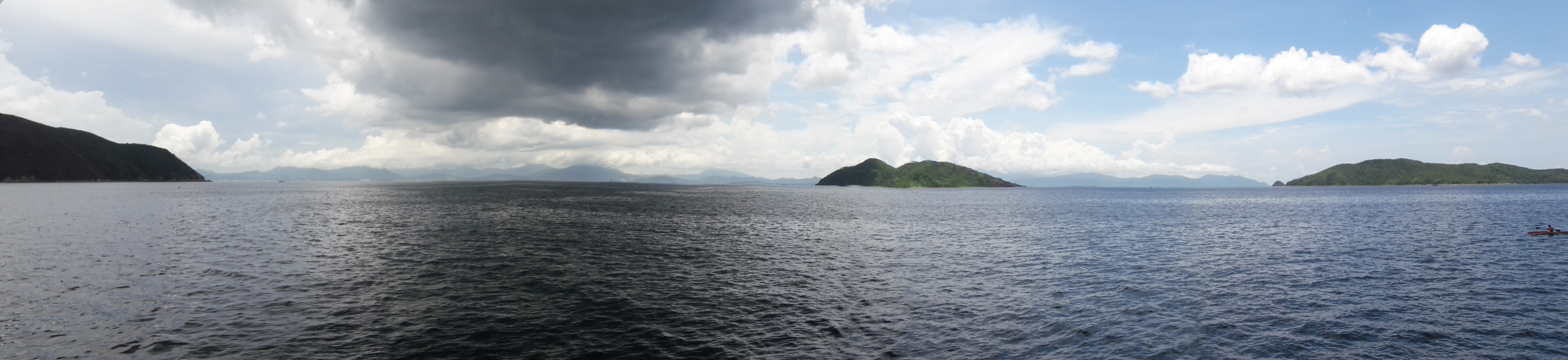
Tolo Channel towards Yantian, Shenzhen

Tolo Channel or Chek Mun Hoi Hap (Chinese: 赤門海峽) is a channel south of Plover Cove in Hong Kong connecting Tolo Harbour to Mirs Bay. At Mirs Bay end, it is named North Channel.

The Chinese name Chek Mun means Red Gate. Hoi Hap is the modern term for a sea channel. It is named red gate for the distinctive red-coloured sedimentary rocks (rich in iron) to its north.

== Geology ==
The channel is the most obvious geologic fault in Hong Kong; the fault line runs in a south-westerly direction through Tide Cove towards Lai Chi Kok. The rocks at the north of the channel are sedimentary while those at the south are igneous. The rocks along the north coast of Tolo Channel and at Wong Chuk Kok Tsui are the oldest in Hong Kong.

== Conservation ==
Sham Shung Coast, a belt of coast between Sham Chung Wan (深涌灣; 'Sham Chung Bay') and Tung King Pai (Flat Reef), located on the southern side of Tolo Channel and in the north-eastern part of Sai Kung Peninsula, covering an area of 26 hectares, was designated as a Site of Special Scientific Interest in 1985.

== See also ==
- Hong Kong National Geopark
- Lai Chi Chong
- Sham Chung
- Bun Sha Pai
- Che Lei Pai
- Chek Chau
