= List of place names used during the Japanese occupation of Hong Kong =

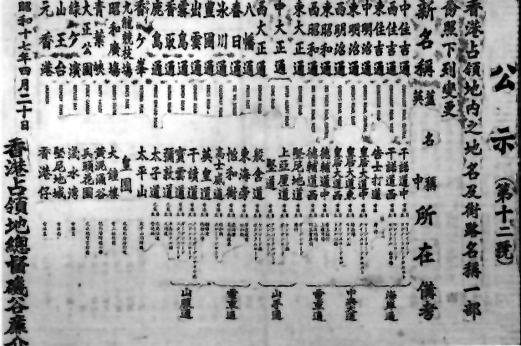
Announcement by the Japanese government on the renaming of streets and places

During the Japanese occupation of Hong Kong, as part of their assimilation policy, Japanese governors advocated for the changing of English and Chinese place names of streets and buildings into Japanese, the official lingua franca. This is a partial list of all street names changed during the Japanese occupation; due to incomplete historical data, it is difficult to verify some place names in the table according to phonetic or transcript.

== Administrative divisions ==
=== Hong Kong ===
Original Name	Name	Kanji	Notes
Hong Kong (香港)	Hong Kong Occupied Territory ^{Honkon-senryochi} Hong Kong Region ^{Honkon-chiku}	香港占領地 香港地區	Now Hong Kong Special Administrative Region (香港特別行政區)

=== Districts ===
District	Name	Kanji	Notes
Hong Kong Island (香港島, Honkon-tō)	Naka-ku	中區	Now Central District (中環)
Hong Kong Island (香港島, Honkon-tō)	Nishi-ku	西區	Now Sheung Wan (上環)
Hong Kong Island (香港島, Honkon-tō)	Mizuki-ku	水城區	Now Sai Ying Pun (西營盤)
Hong Kong Island (香港島, Honkon-tō)	Kuramae-ku	藏前區	Now Shek Tong Tsui (石塘嘴)
Hong Kong Island (香港島, Honkon-tō)	Sanno-ku	山王區	Now Kennedy Town (堅尼地城)
Hong Kong Island (香港島, Honkon-tō)	Higashi-ku	東區	Now Wan Chai (灣仔)
Hong Kong Island (香港島, Honkon-tō)	Kasuga-ku	春日區	Now Canal Road (鵝頸)
Hong Kong Island (香港島, Honkon-tō)	Aoba-ku	青葉區	Now Happy Valley (跑馬地)
Hong Kong Island (香港島, Honkon-tō)	Dorawan-ku	銅鑼灣區	Now Causeway Bay (銅鑼灣)
Hong Kong Island (香港島, Honkon-tō)	Shokiwan-ku	筲箕灣區	Now Shau Kei Wan (筲箕灣) and North Point (北角)
Hong Kong Island (香港島, Honkon-tō)	Motominato-ku	元港區	Now Aberdeen (香港仔) and Pok Fu Lam (薄扶林)
Hong Kong Island (香港島, Honkon-tō)	Sekichū-ku	赤柱區	Now Stanley (赤柱)
Kowloon (九龍, Kyūryū)	Minato-ku	湊區	Now Tsim Sha Tsui (尖沙咀)
Kowloon (九龍, Kyūryū)	Yamashita-ku	山下區	Now Hung Hom (紅磡)
Kowloon (九龍, Kyūryū)	Katori-ku	香取區	Now Yau Ma Tei (油麻地)
Kowloon (九龍, Kyūryū)	Daikaku-ku	大角區	Now Tai Kok Tsui (大角咀) and Mong Kok (旺角)
Kowloon (九龍, Kyūryū)	Aoyama-ku	青山區	Now Sham Shui Po (深水埗)
Kowloon (九龍, Kyūryū)	Kajima-ku, Kashima-ku	鹿島區	Now Kowloon Tong (九龍塘)
Kowloon (九龍, Kyūryū)	Moto-ku	元區	Now Kowloon City (九龍城)
Kowloon (九龍, Kyūryū)	Keitoku-ku	啓德區	Now East Kowloon (東九龍)
Kowloon (九龍, Kyūryū)	Senwan-ku	荃灣區	Now Tsuen Wan (荃灣)
Kowloon (九龍, Kyūryū)	Saiko-ku	西貢區	Now Sai Kung District (西貢)
New Territories (新界, Shinkai)	Shaden-ku	沙田區	Now Sha Tin (沙田)
New Territories (新界, Shinkai)	Taiho-ku	大埔區	Now Tai Po (大埔)
New Territories (新界, Shinkai)	Josui-ku	上水區	Now Sheung Shui (上水) and Fanling (粉嶺)
New Territories (新界, Shinkai)	Shinden-ku	新田區	Now New Territories North (新界北)
New Territories (新界, Shinkai)	Shatokaku-ku	沙頭角區	Now Sha Tau Kok (沙頭角)
New Territories (新界, Shinkai)	Genro-ku	元朗區	Now Yuen Long (元朗) and Tuen Mun (屯門)

== Location names ==
=== Hong Kong Island ===
Name	Kanji	Notes
Nioigamine	香ヶ峯	Now Victoria Peak (太平山)
Honkon-kō	香港港	Now Victoria Harbour (維多利亞港)
Midorigahama	綠ヶ濱	Now Repulse Bay (淺水灣)
Midorigahama Hoteru	綠ヶ濱ホテル	Now Repulse Bay Hotel (淺水灣酒店)
Shōwahiroba	昭和廣塲	Now Statue Square (皇后像廣場)
—	青葉峽競馬場	Now Happy Valley Racecourse (跑馬地馬場)
Taishō Koyen	大正公園, 香港神社	Now the Zoological and Botanical Gardens (香港動植物公園)
Sanno-dai	山王台	Now Kennedy Town (堅尼地城)
Motohonkon	元香港	Now Aberdeen Harbour (香港仔)
Motohonkonwan	元香港灣	Now Aberdeen Bay (石排灣)
Motohonkonkaikyo	元香港海峽	Now Aberdeen Channel (香港仔海峽)
Yawatadori-Hiroba	八幡通廣場	Now the Southorn Playground (修頓球場)
—	琉璜海峽	Now Sulphur Channel (硫磺海峽)
Chuo-Ichiba	中央市場	Now Central Market (中環街市)

=== Kowloon ===
Name	Kanji	Notes
Toa Hoteru	東亞ホテル	Now the Peninsula Hotel (半島酒店)
Kyuriu-Kyogijio	九龍競技塲	Now King's Park (京士柏)
Mukōjima	向島	Now Stonecutters Island (昂船洲)
—	官富山	Now Ping Shan (平山)
—	中興市場	Now Chung King Market (重慶市場)

=== New Territories ===
Kanji	Notes
巨洲	Now Kau Sai Chau (滘西洲)
高洲	Now High Island (粮船灣)
黃麖山	Now Tiu Tang Lung (吊燈籠)
吉澳洲	Now Kat O (吉澳)
大嶼島	Now Lantau Island (大嶼山)
博寮島	Now Lamma Island (南丫島)
長洲島	Now Cheung Chau (長洲)
坪洲島	Now Peng Chau (坪洲)
青衣島	Now Tsing Yi (青衣)
馬灣島	Now Ma Wan (馬灣)
屯門澳	Now Castle Peak Bay (青山灣)
平山	Now Ping Shan (屏山)
鳳洲	Now Tai Long Wan (大浪灣)
鳳山	Now Tai Long Au (大浪坳)
鴉洲	Now Tai A Chau (大鴉洲)
海關凹	Now Duckling Hill (鴨仔山)

== Street names ==
District	Name	Kanji	Notes
Hong Kong Island	Nishisumiyoshi-dori	西住吉通	Now Connaught Road West (干諾道西)
Hong Kong Island	Nakasumiyoshi-dori	中住吉通	Now Connaught Road Center (干諾道中)
Hong Kong Island	Higashisumiyoshi-dori	東住吉通	Now Gloucester Road (告士打道)
Hong Kong Island	Nishimeiji-dori	西明治通	Now Queen's Road West (皇后大道西)
Hong Kong Island	Nakameiji-dori	中明治通	Now Queen's Road Central (皇后大道中)
Hong Kong Island	Higashimeiji-dori	東明治通	Now Queen's Road East (皇后大道東) and Queensway (金鐘道)
Hong Kong Island	Nishishōwa-dori	西昭和通	Now Des Voeux Road West (德輔道西)
Hong Kong Island	Higashishōwa-dori	東昭和通	Now Des Voeux Road Central (德輔道中)
Hong Kong Island	Nishitaishō-dori	西大正通	Now Bonham Road (般咸道)
Hong Kong Island	Nakataishō-dori	中大正通	Now Caine Road (堅道) and Upper Albert Road (上亞厘畢道)
Hong Kong Island	Higashitaishō-dori	東大正通	Now Kennedy Road (堅尼地道)
Hong Kong Island	Yawata-dori	八幡通	Now Hennessy Road (軒尼詩道) and Johnston Road (莊士敦道)
Hong Kong Island	Kasuga-dori	春日通	Now Yee Wo Street (怡和街)
Hong Kong Island	Higawa-dori	氷川通	Now Causeway Road (高士威道)
Hong Kong Island	Hokoku-dori	豐國通	Now King's Road (英皇道)
Hong Kong Island	Izumo-dori	出雲通	Now Conduit Road (干德道)
Hong Kong Island	Kirishima-dori	霧島通	Now Bowen Road (寶雲道)
Kowloon	Katori-dori	香取通	Now Nathan Road (彌敦道)
Kowloon	Kashima-dori	鹿島通	Now Prince Edward Road (太子道)
