= Sai Wan (disambiguation) =

Sai Wan is the name or part of the name of several places in Hong Kong.

- Sai Wan (西環) means Western District:
  - Sai Wan, Western District
- Sai Wan (西灣) means West bay:
  - Sai Wan, Cheung Chau
  - Sai Wan, Ma Wan
  - Sai Wan, Sai Kung
  - Sai Wan, Tai A Chau
  - Fan Lau Sai Wan
  - Kau Sai Wan

Sai Wan is also the former name of Chai Wan:

- Sai Wan War Cemetery

== See also ==
- Sai Wan Shan (disambiguation)
- Siu Sai Wan
- Sai Wan Ho
