= Tai Long Sai Wan =

Beach in Hong Kong

Coordinates: 22°23′57.35″N 114°22′24.14″E

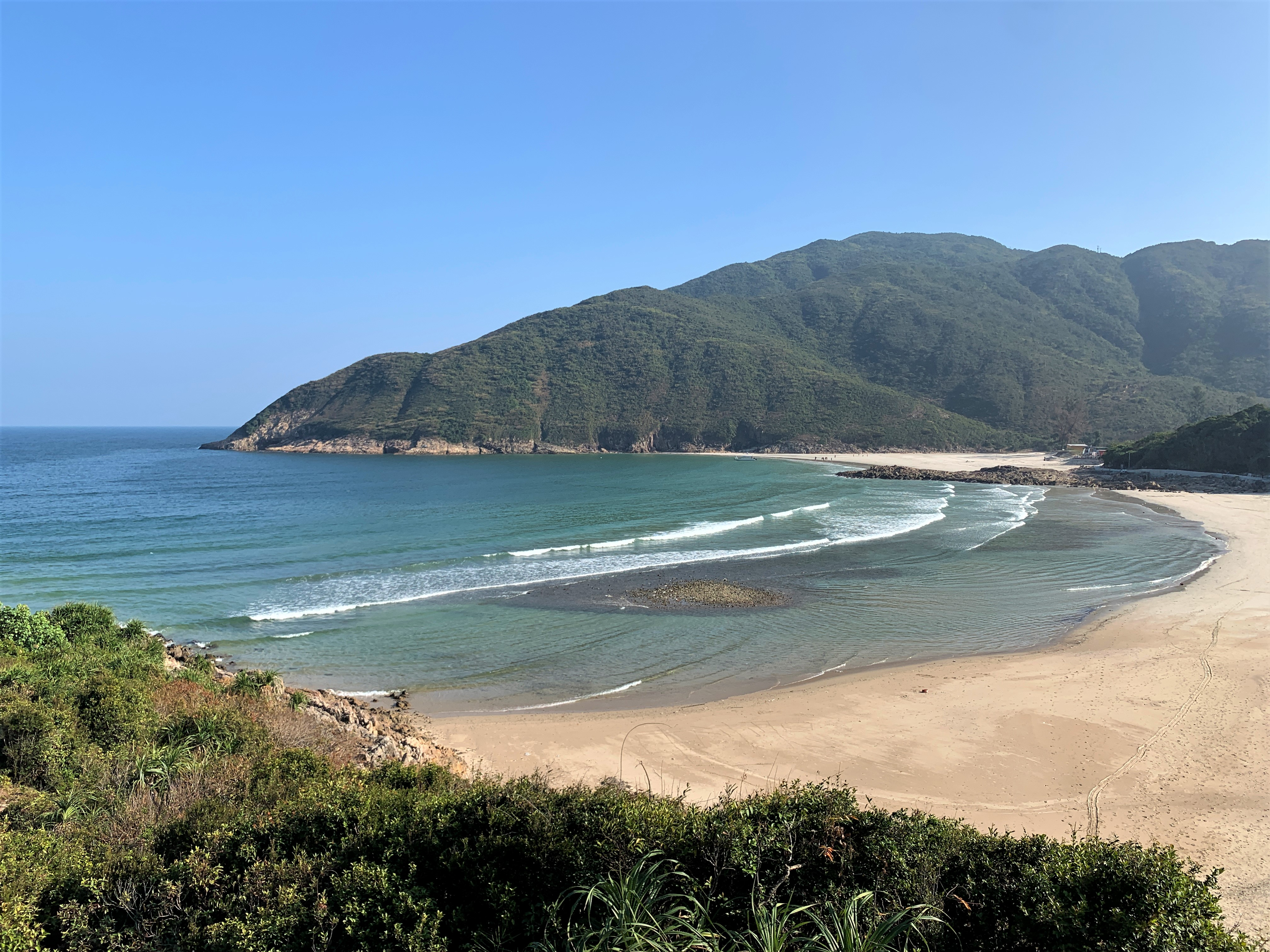
Overlooking Sai Wan.

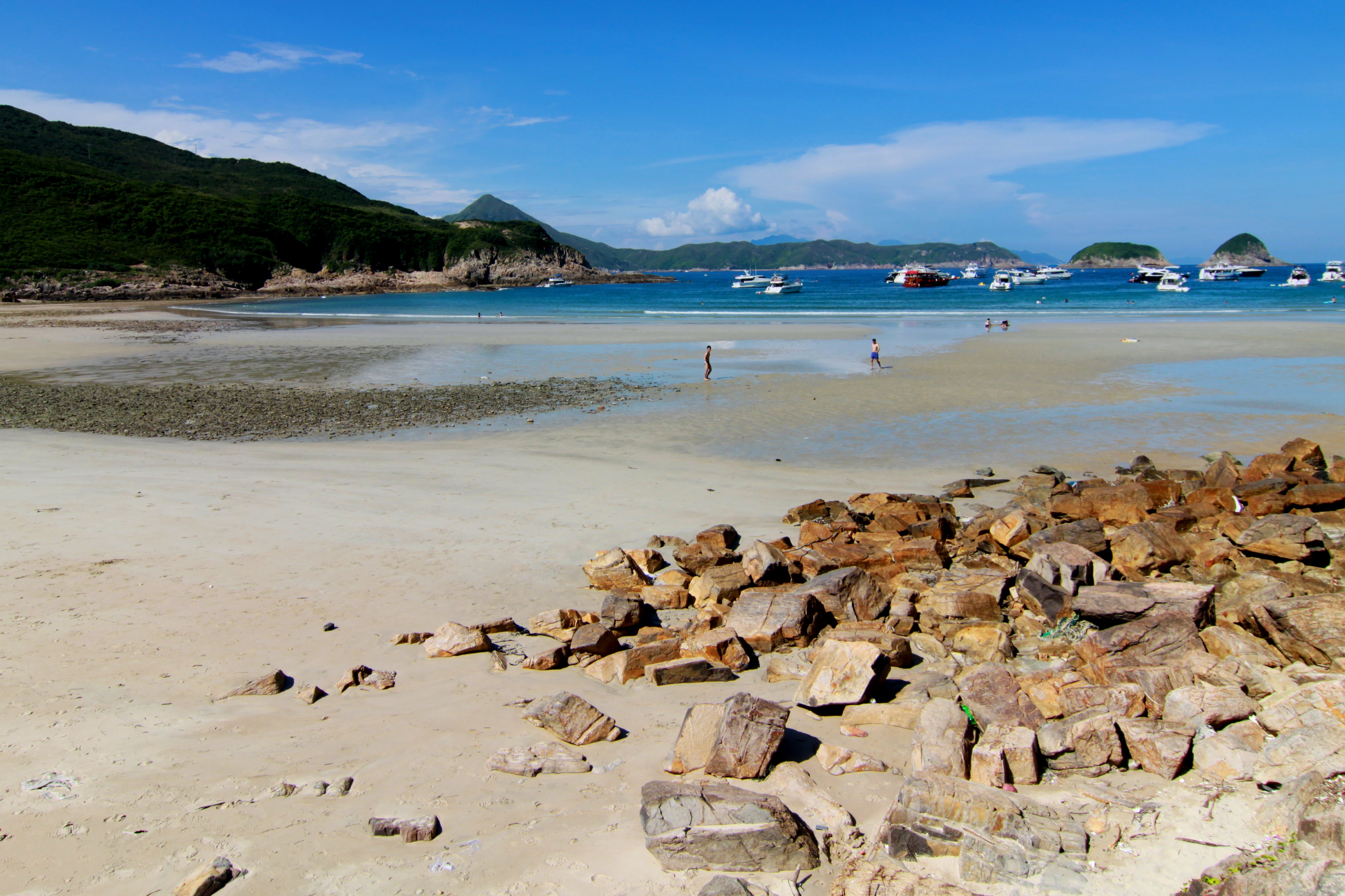
Sai Wan.

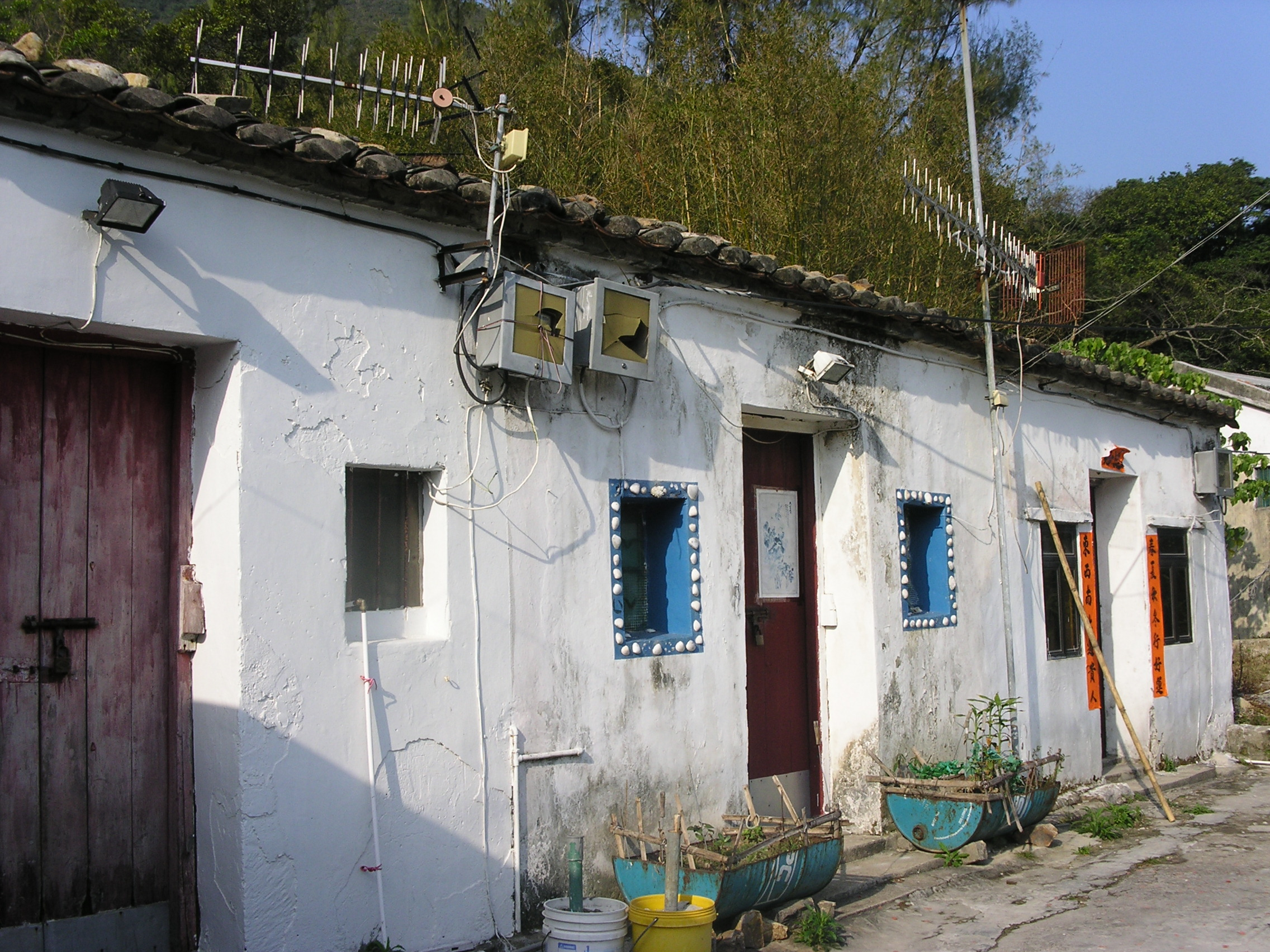
Houses in Sai Wan.

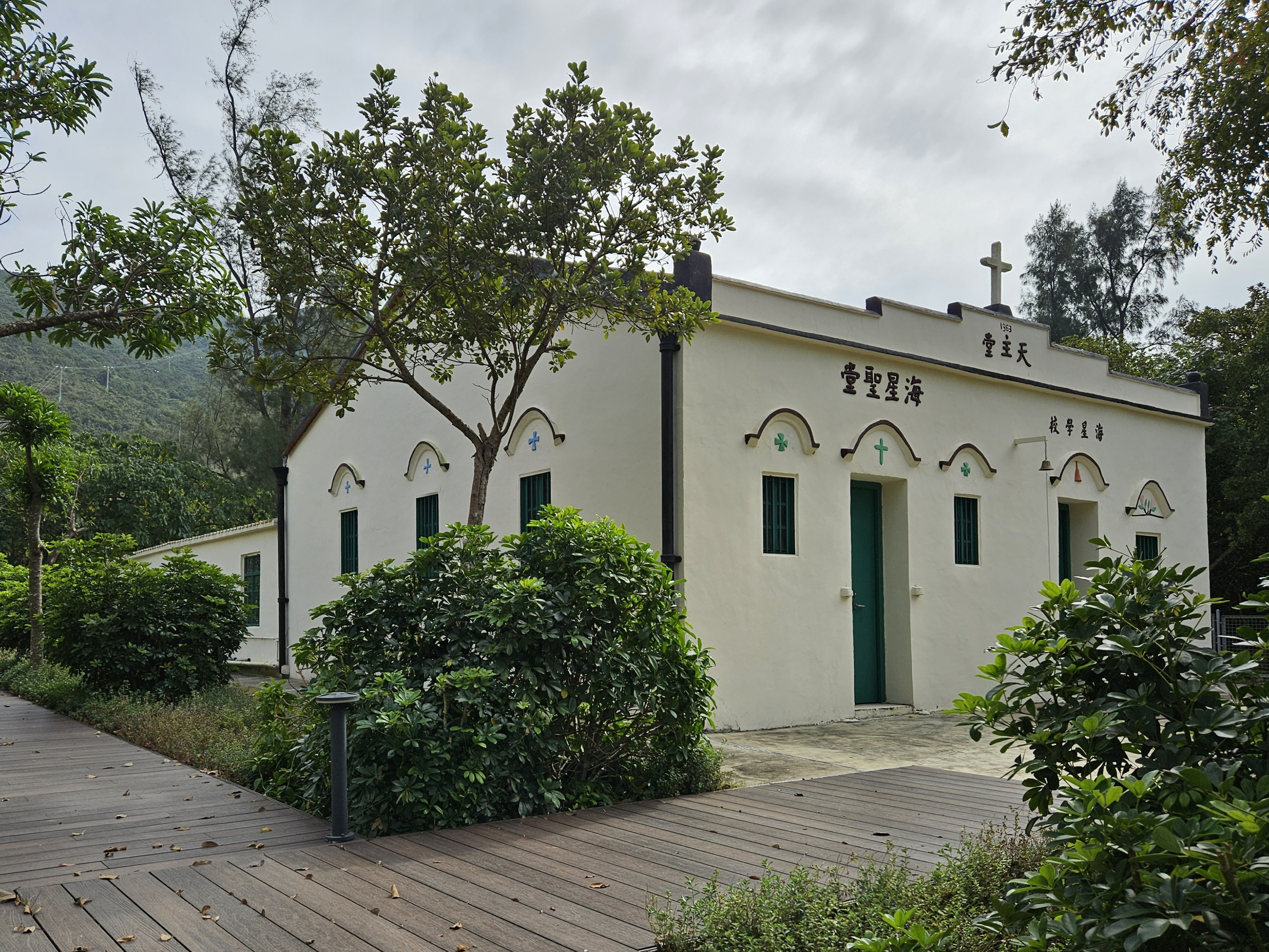
Star of the Sea Mass Centre and Hoi Sing School in Sai Wan.

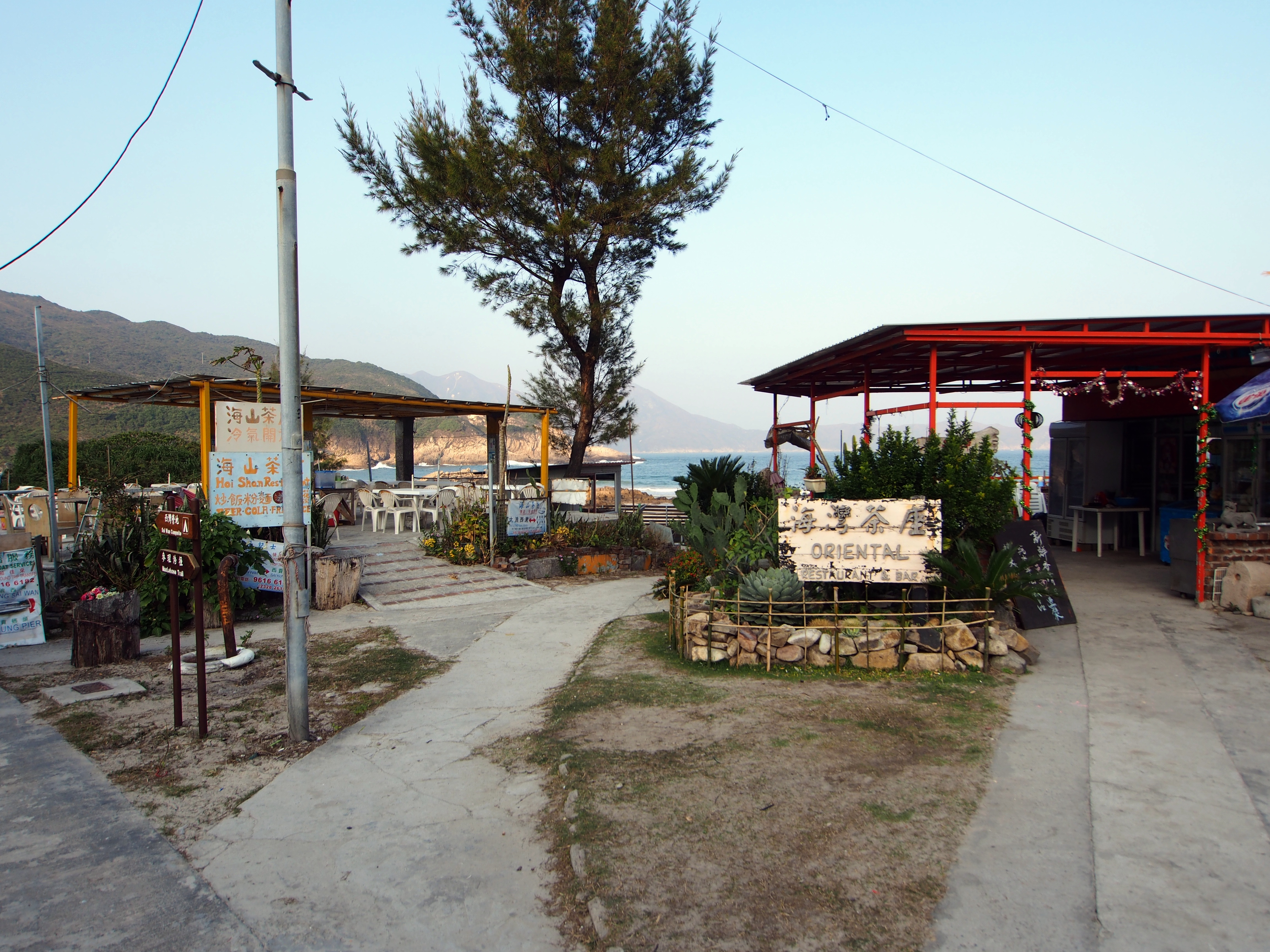
Restaurants in Sai Wan.

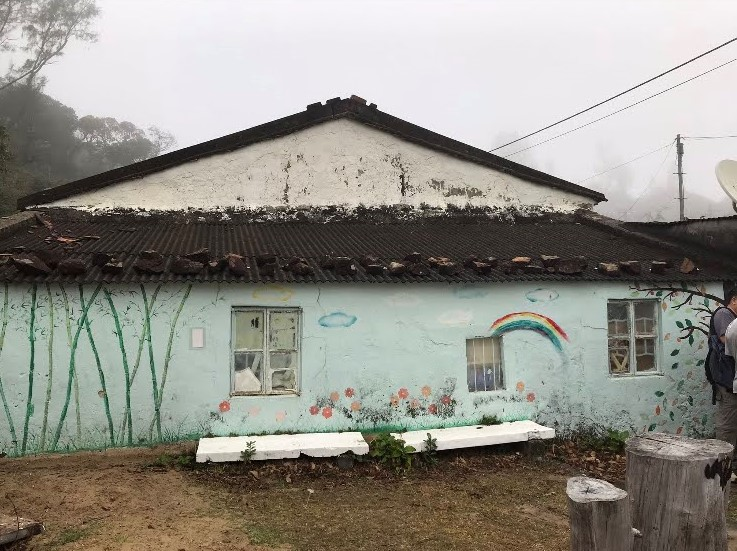
Mural in Sai Wan.

Sai Wan (Chinese: 西灣; lit. 'West Bay') is a beach in Sai Kung Peninsula, Hong Kong. To distinguish it from other bays and beaches of the same name, it is commonly known as Tai Long Sai Wan, as it is one of the four main beaches of Tai Long Wan. It came first in the Hong Kong Best 10 Scenic Sites Election in 2006.

The beaches in the Tai Long Sai Wan area are not suitable for swimming because of the presence of strong rip currents year-round, which means swimmers could be pulled into the open sea when caught in a rip current. Many drowning fatalities have occurred because of the rip currents.

== Administration ==
Sai Wan is a recognized village under the New Territories Small House Policy.

== History ==
The genealogy of the Li family of Tai Long Sai Wan mentions that their ancestors settled in Tai Long Wan and the surrounding areas during the period from 1465 to 1487.

Sai Wan used to be a typhoon shelter for fishing boats but the High Island Reservoir project blocked the shortcut channel.

== Features ==
The Star of the Sea Mass Centre (海星彌撒中心) in Sai Wan is one of the historic churches of Sai Kung Peninsula. It was built in 1953, rebuilt in 1963, and restored in 2021. The Hoi Sing School (海星學校) is adjacent to it.

== Scenery ==
Sai Wan is situated in Sai Kung East Country Park at Stage 2 of the MacLehose Trail. It is next to Ham Tin Village, which has a restaurant that rents out camping equipment and surf boards apart from serving dishes.

It is characterized by white sand and clear blue waters, which is attributable to its relative inaccessibility. It is quiet and untainted, usually visited by junk-trippers and hikers only.

It has been described as one of the best scenic spots in Sai Kung East or even Hong Kong. It came first in the Hong Kong Best 10 Scenic Sites Election in 2006.

== Accidents ==
Tai Long Wan translates to "Big Wave Bay" in Cantonese, which indicates its strong currents. It is also not a gazetted public beach, which means it has no lifeguard and is not managed by the Leisure and Cultural Services Department. There is also no shark nets. It is not recommended for swimming.

Hong Kong Underwater Archaeological Association vice chairman and diving instructor Johny Lee said it was a wide beach with a narrow opening to the open sea, causing strong currents especially during September. He remarked that it was good for diving as the water was clear and one could observe the marine life of the area. However, he also noted that the strong current made it dangerous and people should be very careful if they decide to swim there.

=== Fatalities ===
A number of drowning fatalities have happened in the bay.

- August 28, 2001: a 49-year-old male off-duty firefighter and two other firefighters were unfortunately caught more than 100 meters offshore when they tried to rescue a 15-year-old who was swept away by waves. Two firefighters were rescued by villagers while the 49-year-old firefighter and the 15-year-old drowned.
- June 24, 2002: a 25-year-old male off-duty firefighter drowned while swimming from a yacht 50 meters offshore to the beach with a floating board.
- July 2005: a 52-year-old manager of CLP drowned due to exhaustion while swimming from the beach to a yacht.
- September 27, 2009: a 19-year-old PolyU student drowned when he was swept away by a huge wave 2 meters high.
- June 30, 2021: a 70-year-old man and his friend were swimming in the waters about 150 meters offshore when the man drowned and disappeared. After being rescued, he was certified dead at Tseung Kwan O Hospital.

== Development controversy ==
On 16 July 2010, it was reported that a large private development is under way in a site directly behind Sai Wan. It was revealed that businessman Simon Lo Lin-shing, chairman of Mongolia Energy Corporation and Vision Values Holdings, has acquired several plots of an abandoned village for a total of about HK$16 million to form the site that falls just outside the Hong Kong Country Parks & Special Areas and is not covered by any Outline Zoning Plans.

The concerned strip of land, around 10,000 square metres in size, has been cleared of vegetation by diggers. A warning sign is put up on the excavation site to warn against trespassing.

The nature of the private development is unclear. Villagers claimed that a private lodge will be built with artificial ponds, a tennis court and separate apartment. Meanwhile, a spokeswoman for Vision Values Holdings said that there were no plans for any large-scale works, and that because the owner was very green himself, the land would be developed in a low-profile way. Lo also claimed he would be building an organic garden with pools for public use on the site.

As of 23 July 2010, more than 68,000 people have joined the Facebook group that opposes the private development. Green groups are planning a protest hike, tentatively set for 25 July 2010. A leading conservationist has said that the incident will give a bad impression to the UNESCO, which will be asked to grant World Heritage status to the Hong Kong National Geopark.

Many were also infuriated with the government for not doing more to stop the destruction. After the reporting of the incident by the media on 16 July 2010, Secretary for the Environment Edward Yau Tang-wah was inquired about the incident on the next day but said he knew nothing about it. Yau visited the site on 20 July 2010 and said the government had to strike a balance between respecting private land and protecting the environment. Diggers have been mostly working on private land but a small section of the site is over government land. Yau warned the land owner that any redevelopment on agricultural land requires approval from the Lands Office, otherwise no construction work should proceed. The government has promised to meet with the landowner to work out a plan that will satisfy all parties concerned.

Peter Li, campaign manager at the Conservancy Association, expressed disappointment with Yau's remarks, saying the government failed to make any concrete promises to address the issue. Designing Hong Kong convener Paul Zimmerman called on the government to restrict development even on private land near country parks: "They must now put up land control and planning control on those sites so they can no longer be destroyed." Other environmentalists urged that part or all of private land within country parks be repossessed to avoid further damage to the natural landscape.

Meanwhile, Secretary for Development Carrie Lam Cheng Yuet-ngor said the government will not repossess private land whenever there is a public outcry. Conservation may be achieved through many other ways, she said.

Sai Wan is also not the only scenic spot at risk: South China Morning Post reported that about 20 sites within or close to two country parks in Sai Kung are vulnerable to the same type of development.

== See also ==
- Beaches of Hong Kong
