= Wong Mo Ying =

Village in Hong Kong

Coordinates: 22.403228°N 114.295079°E

- Traditional Chinese: 黃毛應
- Simplified Chinese: 黄毛应
Transcriptions
Standard Mandarin
- Hanyu Pinyin: Huáng Máo Ying?
Yue: Cantonese
- Jyutping: wong4 mou4 jing?

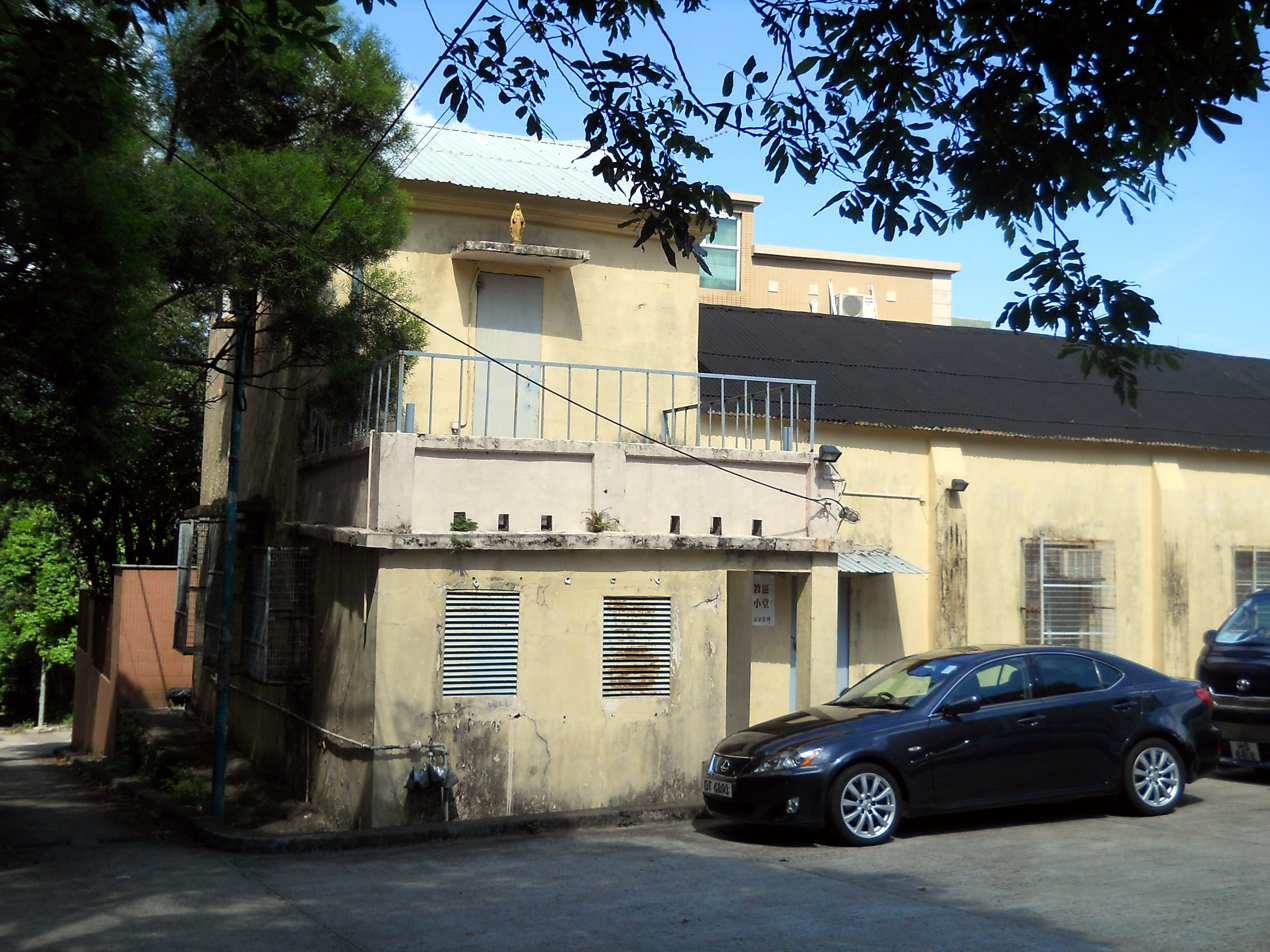
Rosary Mission Centre (玫瑰小堂), a chapel built in 1940 in Wong Mo Ying.

Wong Mo Ying (Chinese: 黃毛應) is a village in the Tai Mong Tsai area of Sai Kung District, Hong Kong.

Wong Mo Ying is a Hakka village which was populated by inhabitants with the surname Tang (鄧), originally from Danshui (淡水) of Huizhou, who settled in Wong Mo Ying probably between the 1750s and the 1840s.

Wong Mo Ying is a recognized village under the New Territories Small House Policy.

The Rosary Mission Centre (玫瑰小堂) is a chapel built in 1940 in Wong Mo Ying. On February 3, 1942, the Hong Kong-Kowloon Independent Battalion (東江縱隊港九獨立大隊) under the People's Anti-Japanese Principal Guerrilla Force of Guangdong, or Dongjiang Guerrilla Force, was established in Wong Mo Ying Church. The chapel is listed as a Grade II historic building.
