= Sai Wan Shan =

Sai Wan Shan (Chinese: 西灣山) may refer to the following hills in Hong Kong:

- Sai Wan Shan (Chai Wan), a hill in Chai Wan, Hong Kong Island
- Sai Wan Shan (Sai Kung), a hill within Sai Kung East Country Park on the Sai Kung Peninsula
