= Historic churches of Sai Kung Peninsula =

Historic Churches

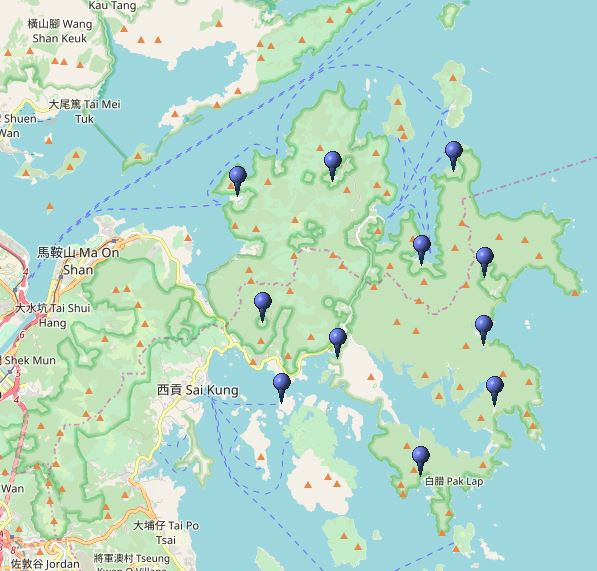
Location of the historic churches of Sai Kung

The historic churches of Sai Kung are Roman Catholic churches and chapels established in the 19th and 20th centuries by missionaries in the Sai Kung Peninsula and surrounding islands, across modern day administrative areas: the Sai Kung District and Sai Kung North of Tai Po District.

== History ==
The churches were established by missionaries from the Seminary of Foreign Missions of Milan (now the Pontifical Institute for Foreign Missions). The first missionary to take up residence in Sai Kung Peninsula, in 1865, was Fr. P. Gaetano Origo (1835–1868). A first chapel was opened in the market town of Sai Kung in the late 1865.

- Hakka villages included: Wong Mo Ying, Yim Tin Tsai
- Punti villages included: Chek Keng, Tai Long Tsuen

The Immaculate Heart of Mary Chapel (聖母無玷之心小堂) was built in 1953 in the former village of Sha Tsui (沙咀). It was submerged, together with the village, at the time of the construction of the High Island Reservoir in the 1970s.

== List of churches ==
Note: A territory-wide grade reassessment of historic buildings is ongoing. The churches with a "Not listed" status in the table below are not graded and do not appear in the list of historic buildings considered for grading.

Location	Notes	Status	References	Photographs
Tai Long Tsuen (大浪村), Tai Long Wan; 22.417524°N 114.371676°E	Chapel of the Immaculate Conception (聖母無原罪小堂) Built in 1867.	Grade III		
Chek Keng; 22.421198°N 114.349919°E	Holy Family Chapel (聖家小堂) Built in 1874 to replace an earlier chapel that had been damaged by a storm in 1867. The whole village later converted to Catholicism. During the Japanese occupation of Hong Kong, the chapel was a base of the Hong Kong-Kowloon Independent Battalion of the East River Guerrilla (東江縱隊港九獨立大隊).	Grade II		
Tan Ka Wan (蛋家灣); 22.451455°N 114.36188°E	St. Peter's Chapel (聖伯多祿小堂) Built in 1873. It also housed the Sung Ming School (崇明學校). A nearby, more modern building was renovated in 2021, and was also named "St. Peter's Chapel".	Nil grade		
Sham Chung (深涌); 22.443210°N 114.286710°E	Epiphany of Our Lord Chapel (三王來朝小堂) Established in 1879. Rebuilt in 1956. The chapel housed a school called Kung Man School (公民學校), which had about 50 pupils and two teachers.	Grade III		
Pak Sha O (白沙澳); 22.44785°N 114.319266°E	Immaculate Heart of Mary Chapel (聖母無玷之心小堂) A first chapel was built in Pak Sha O in 1880 on another site. The conversion of Pak Sha O into a Catholic village partly resulted from the desire of the villagers to combat the harassment of the tax-lords of Sheung Shui. The current chapel was built between 1915 and 1923. The site is now used as a training campsite by the Catholic Scout Guild.	Grade III		
Yim Tin Tsai; 22.377457°N 114.301681°E	St. Joseph's Chapel (鹽田梓聖若瑟小堂) Built in 1890, the current chapel received the Award of Merit by the UNESCO Asia Pacific Heritage Awards for Cultural Heritage Conservation in 2005.	Grade II		
Pak Tam Chung (北潭涌); 22.391804°N 114.321110°E	Our Lady of Sorrows Chapel aka. Our Lady of the Seven Sorrows Chapel (聖母七苦小堂) Built in 1900.	Grade III		
Pak A (北丫), High Island; 22.354524°N 114.349386°E	Lung Shun Wan Mission Centre (龍船灣天主堂) Built in 1910.	Not listed		
Long Ke (浪茄); 22.376502°N 114.375000°E	Nativity of Our Lady Chapel (聖母聖誕小堂) Built in 1918.	Grade III		
Wong Mo Ying (黃毛應), Tai Mong Tsai; 22.403394°N 114.295251°E	Rosary Mission Centre (玫瑰小堂) Built in 1940. On 3 February 1942, the Hong Kong-Kowloon Independent Battalion under the People's Anti-Japanese Principal Guerrilla Force of Guangdong, or Dongjiang Guerrilla Force, was established in Wong Mo Ying Church.	Grade II		
Sai Wan, Tai Long Wan; 22.396°N 114.37101°E	Star of the Sea Mass Centre aka. Star of the Sea Chapel (海星彌撒中心) Built in 1953. Rebuilt in 1963. Restored in 2021.	Pending		

== See also ==
- Roman Catholic Diocese of Hong Kong
- List of Catholic churches in Hong Kong
