= Tai Mong Tsai =

Village and area in Hong Kong

Coordinates: 22.393682°N 114.300134°E

Tai Mong Tsai (Chinese: 大網仔) is a village and an area in Sai Kung District, Hong Kong.

== Administration ==
Tai Mong Tsai is a recognized village under the New Territories Small House Policy.

== See also ==
- Sai Kung West Country Park
- Historic churches of Sai Kung Peninsula
- Wong Mo Ying
