= Ham Tin =

Coordinates: 22.411532°N 114.376068°E

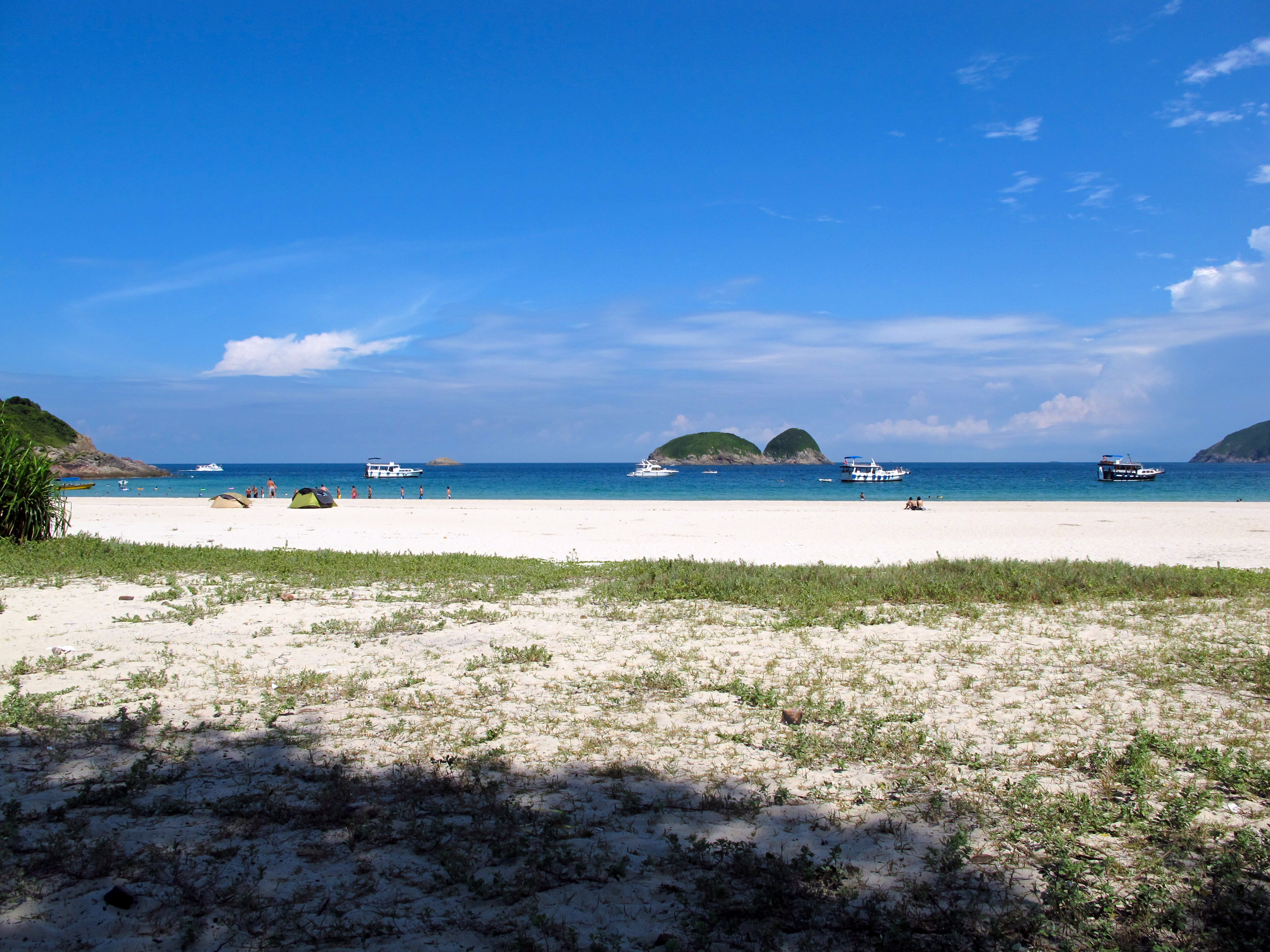
Ham Tin Beach in 2010.

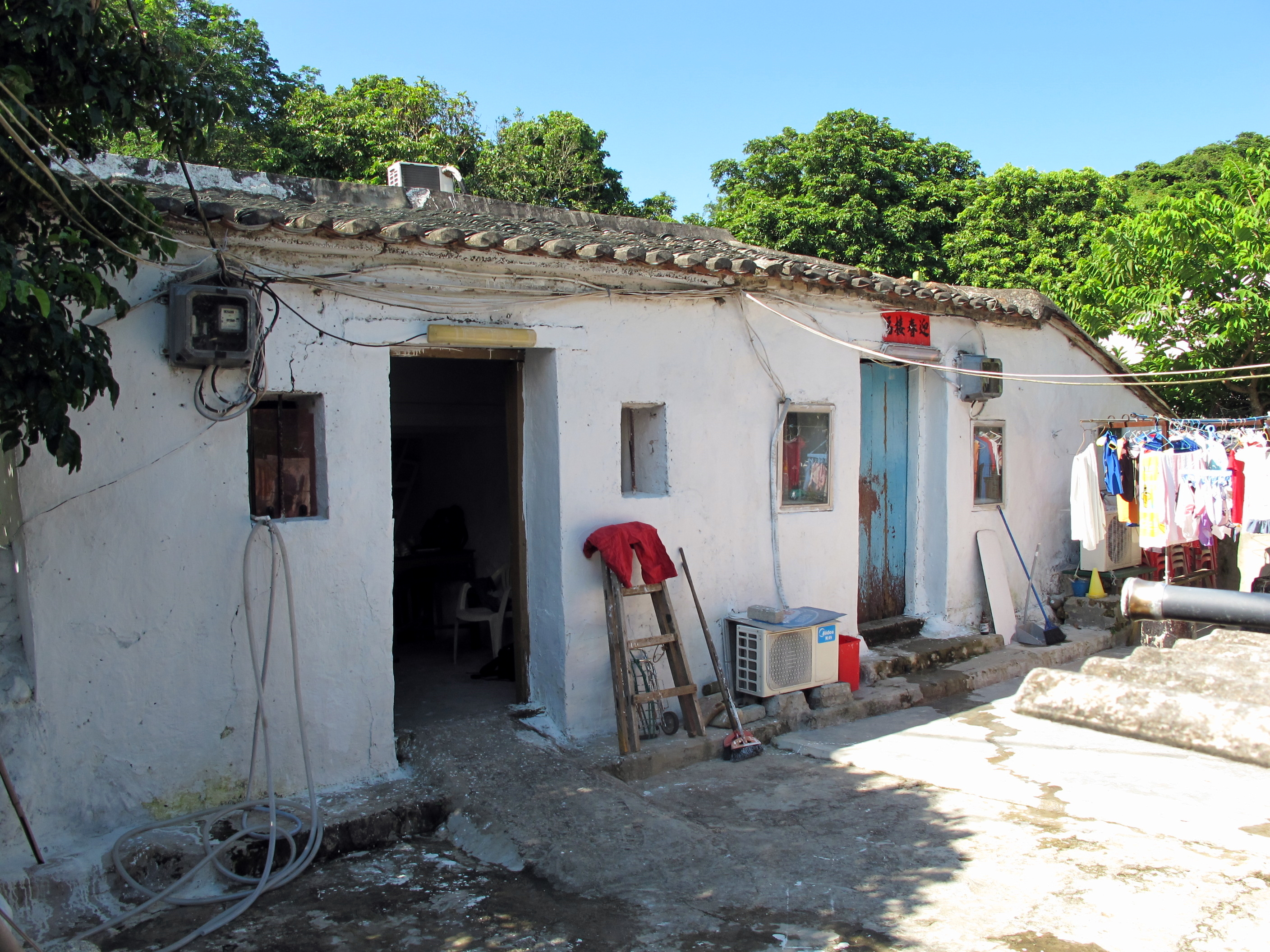
Ham Tin Village in 2010.

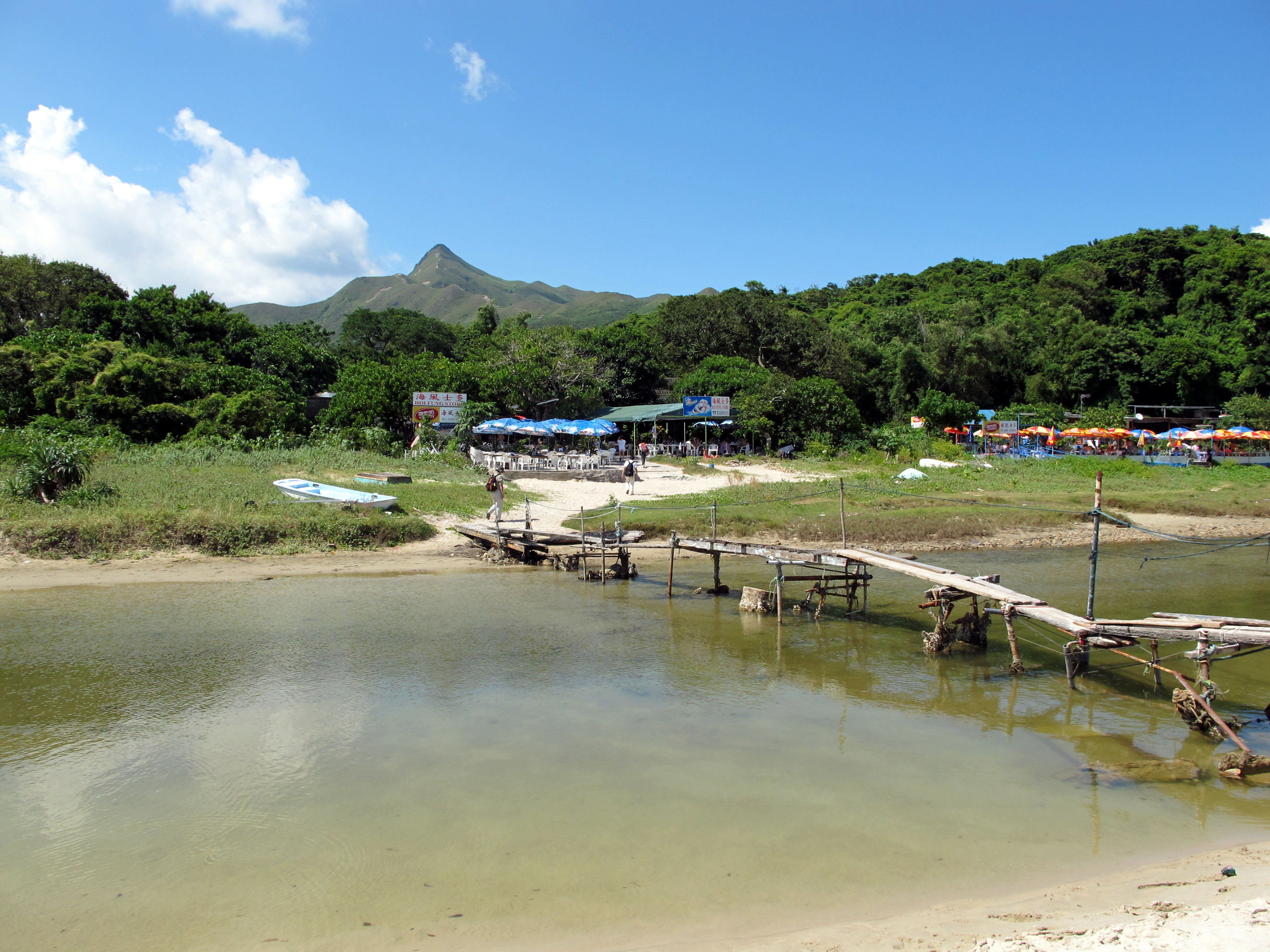
Tai Long Wan Hoi Fung Store of Ham Tin Village.

Ham Tin (Chinese: 鹹田; lit. 'salty field') or Ham Tin Tsuen (鹹田村; 'Ham Tin Village') is a village facing Ham Tin Wan (鹹田灣; 'Salty Field Bay'), one of the four main bays of Tai Long Wan, in the Sai Kung District of Hong Kong.

== Geography ==
Ham Tin is located in eastern Sai Kung. The Ham Tin area is set in a rural landscape, surrounded by mountains, with one main river flowing directly into Ham Tin Wan.

There are four villages with over 200 years of history in Tai Long Wan including Tai Long Village, Lam Uk Wai, Cheung Uk Wai and Ham Tin Village. However, only Tai Long Village and Ham Tin Village still exist and the other two have been abandoned and became ruins.

== Administration ==
Tai Long, including Lam Uk and Ham Tin, are recognized villages under the New Territories Small House Policy.

== History ==
In the past, the people in Tai Long mainly relied on fishing and farming (e.g. rice and sugarcane) to earn a living. Lives were simple and tough; many of them walked 4 or 5 hours to Ngau Chi Wan in Kowloon in order to sell their crops and fish. Some of them transported timber to Shau Kei Wan and Aberdeen by boat and sold them in exchange for daily necessities. Today, Tai Long still does not have a ferry pier. Ham Tin Tsuen is believed to have a history of over 150 years. The village has been inhabited by the Wan clan for about 7 or 8 generations. The Wans moved from northern China and settled in Tai Nam Wu, Sai Kung, long time ago. About 150 years ago, three Wan brothers from Tai Nam Wu spread out and settled in different areas of the New Territories - one settled in Tai Po Tsai, another in Ho Chung, and the third one in Ham Tin Tsuen in Sai Kung. It is believed that the one who settled in Ham Tin Tsuen was the founding ancestor of the village. Many villagers have emigrated to Britain and there are only fewer than 10 villagers in total.
