= Duckling Hill =

Hill in Hong Kong

- 鴨仔山
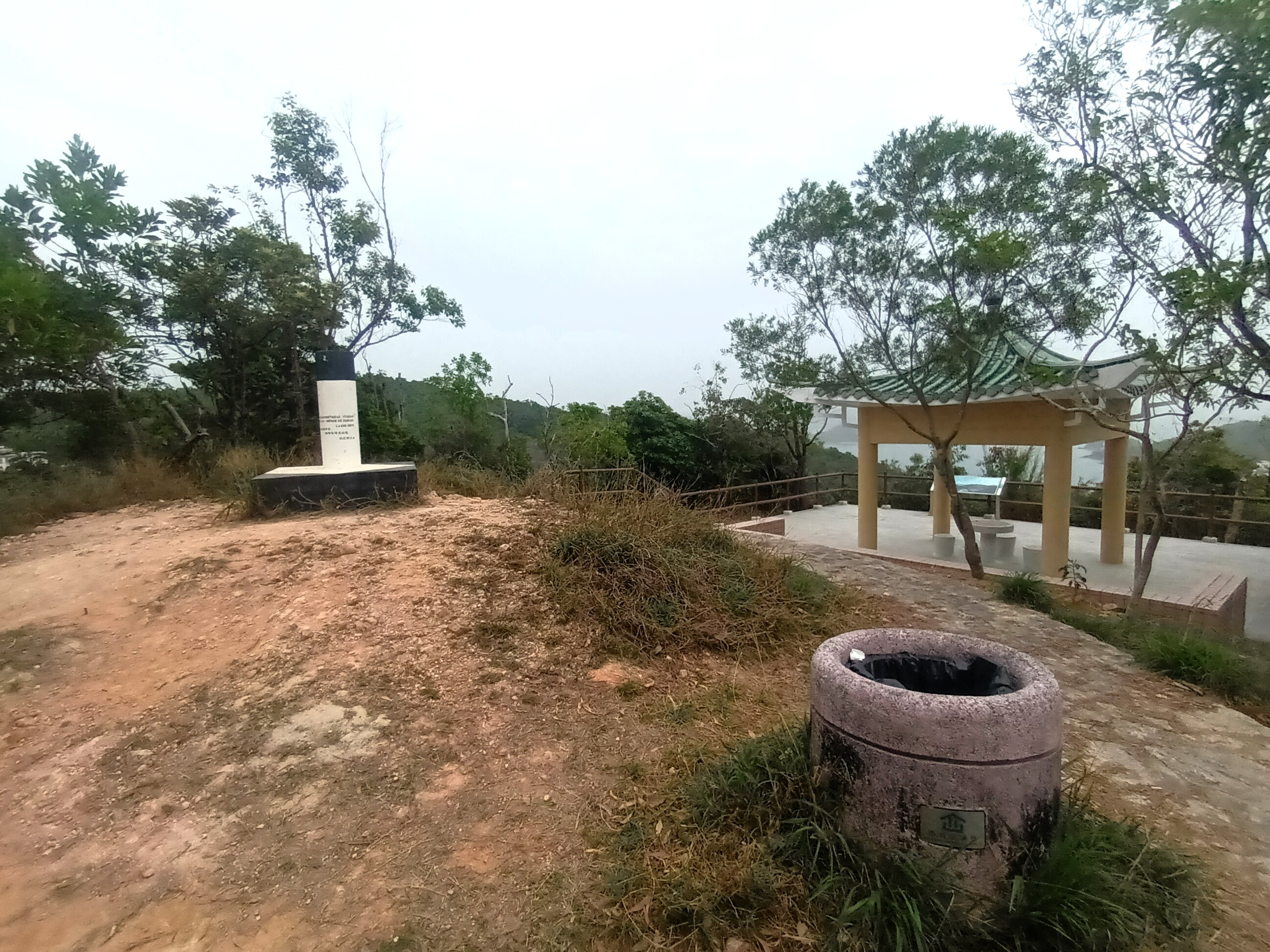
- Summit of Duckling Hill

Highest point
- Elevation: 153 m (502 ft)
- Listing: List of mountains, peaks and hills in Hong Kong
- Coordinates: 22°19′25″N 114°15′49″E

Geography
- Location within Hong Kong
- Location: Eastern New Territories, Hong Kong

Duckling Hill, also known as Ap Tsai Shan (Chinese: 鴨仔山) indigenously, is a hill in the area of Tseung Kwan O, New Territories, Hong Kong. It is 153 metres (502 ft) metres tall. The neighbourhoods of Hang Hau and Po Lam are adjacent to this hill. There is an outlook area not far from the summit.

== See also ==
- Geography of Hong Kong
- Clear Water Bay Road
