= Tai Long Wan, Sai Kung =

Bay on the east coast of the Sai Kung Peninsula in Hong Kong

Coordinates: 22.405395°N 114.389464°E

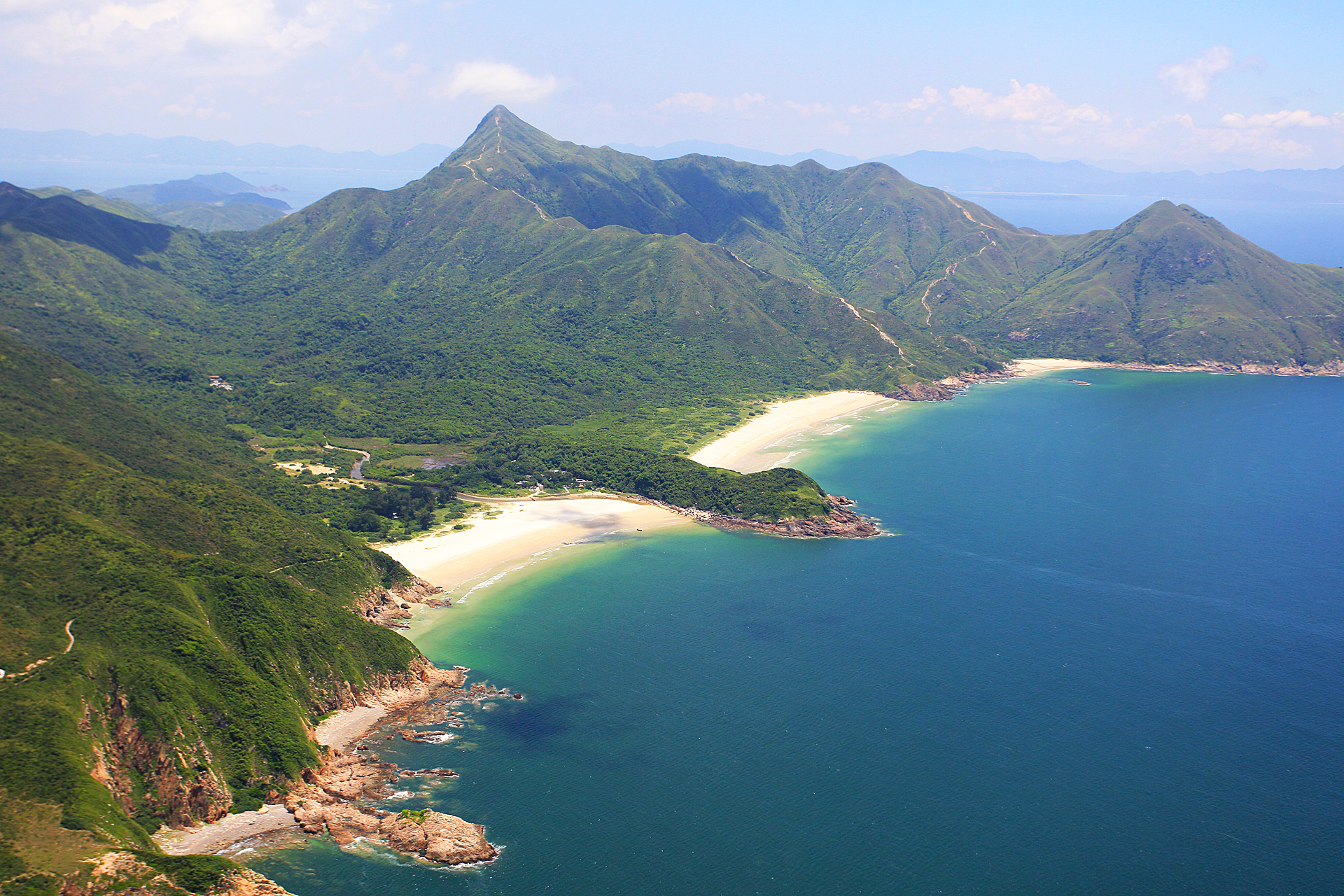
View of Tai Long Wan and Sharp Peak (centre left). The beach in the foreground is Ham Tin Wan. Further beaches beyond the small peninsula are Tai Wan and Tung Wan.

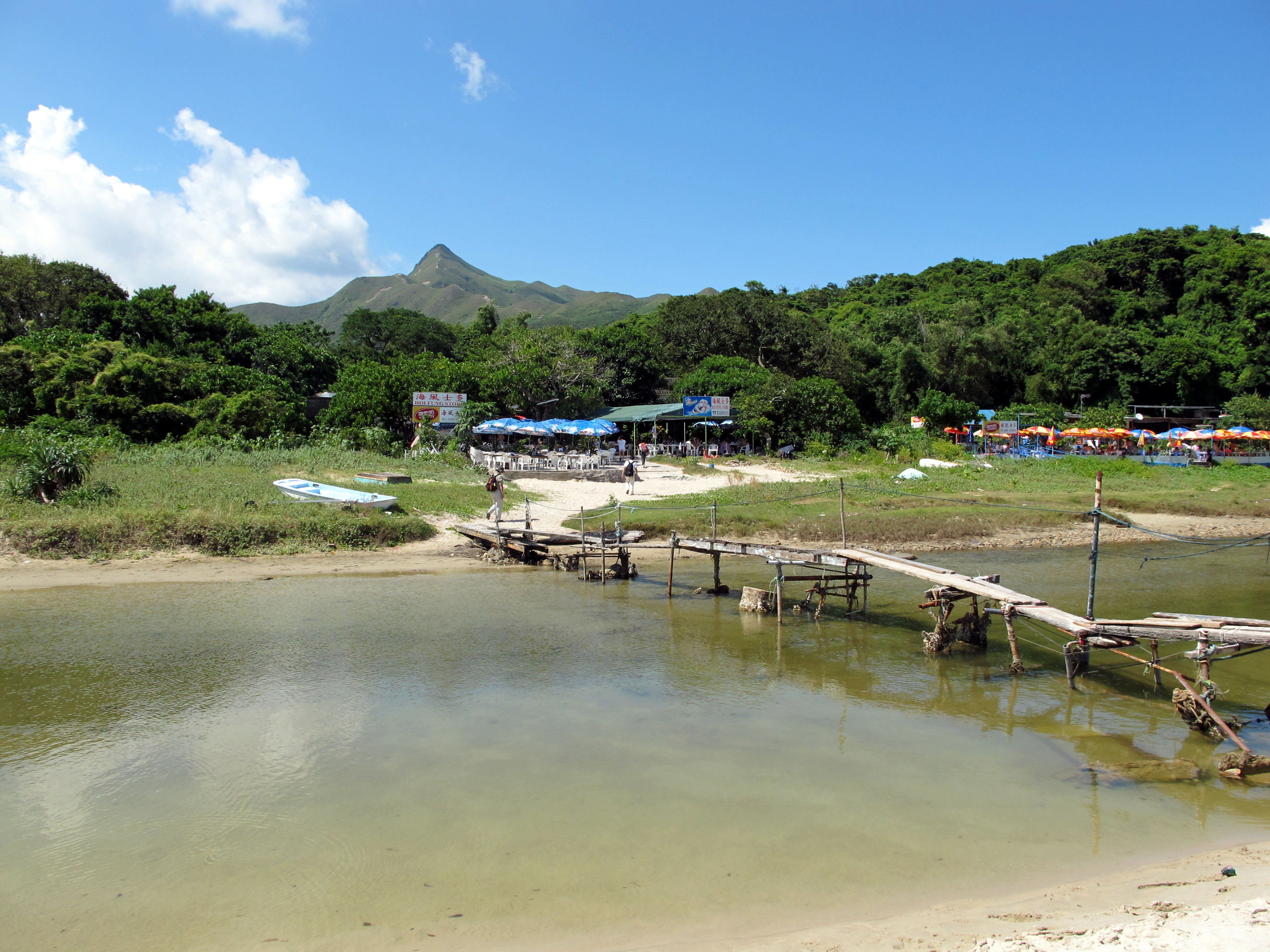
Cafes at Ham Tin Wan.

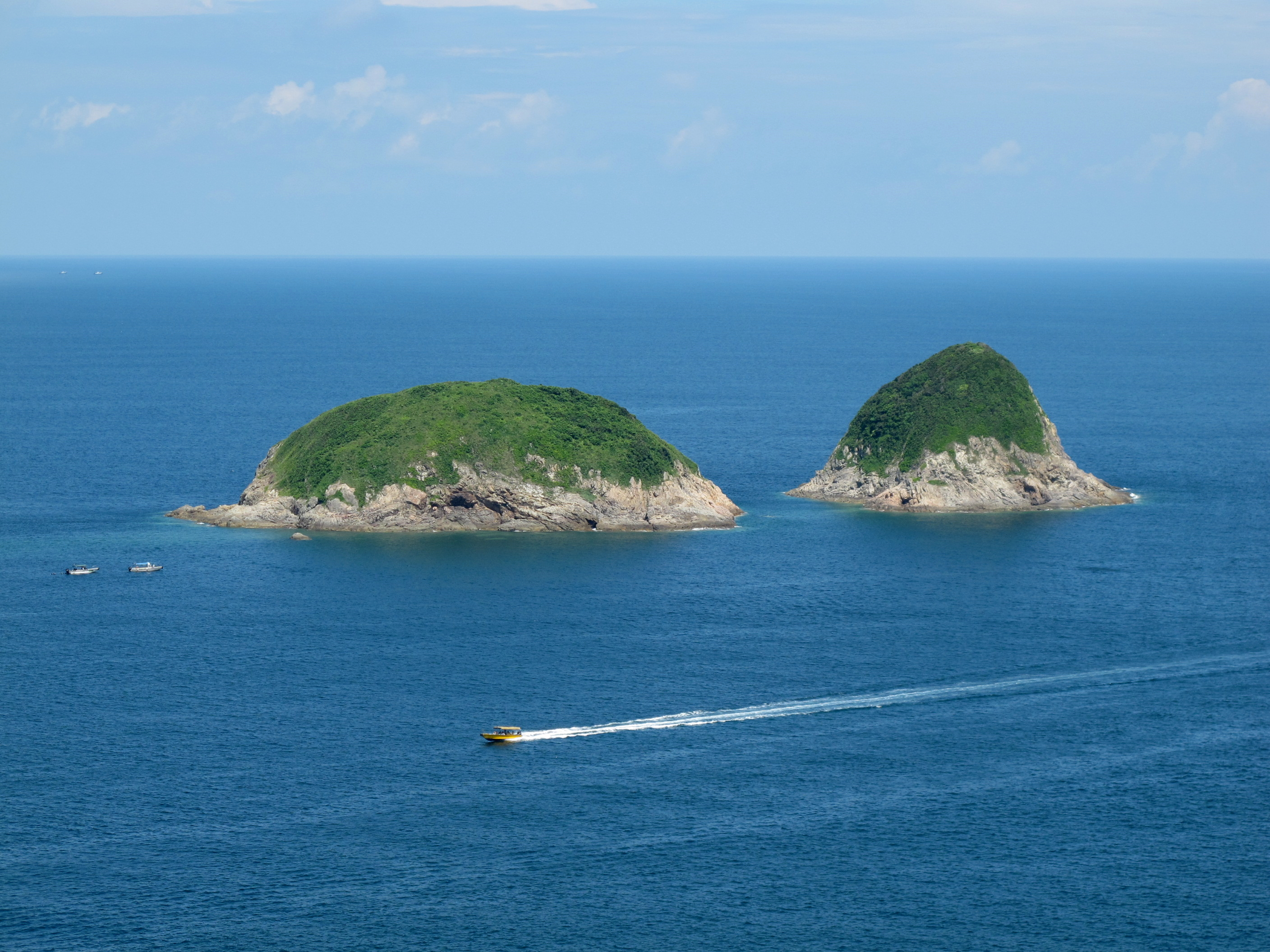
Tai Chau and Tsim Chau islets in Tai Long Wan.

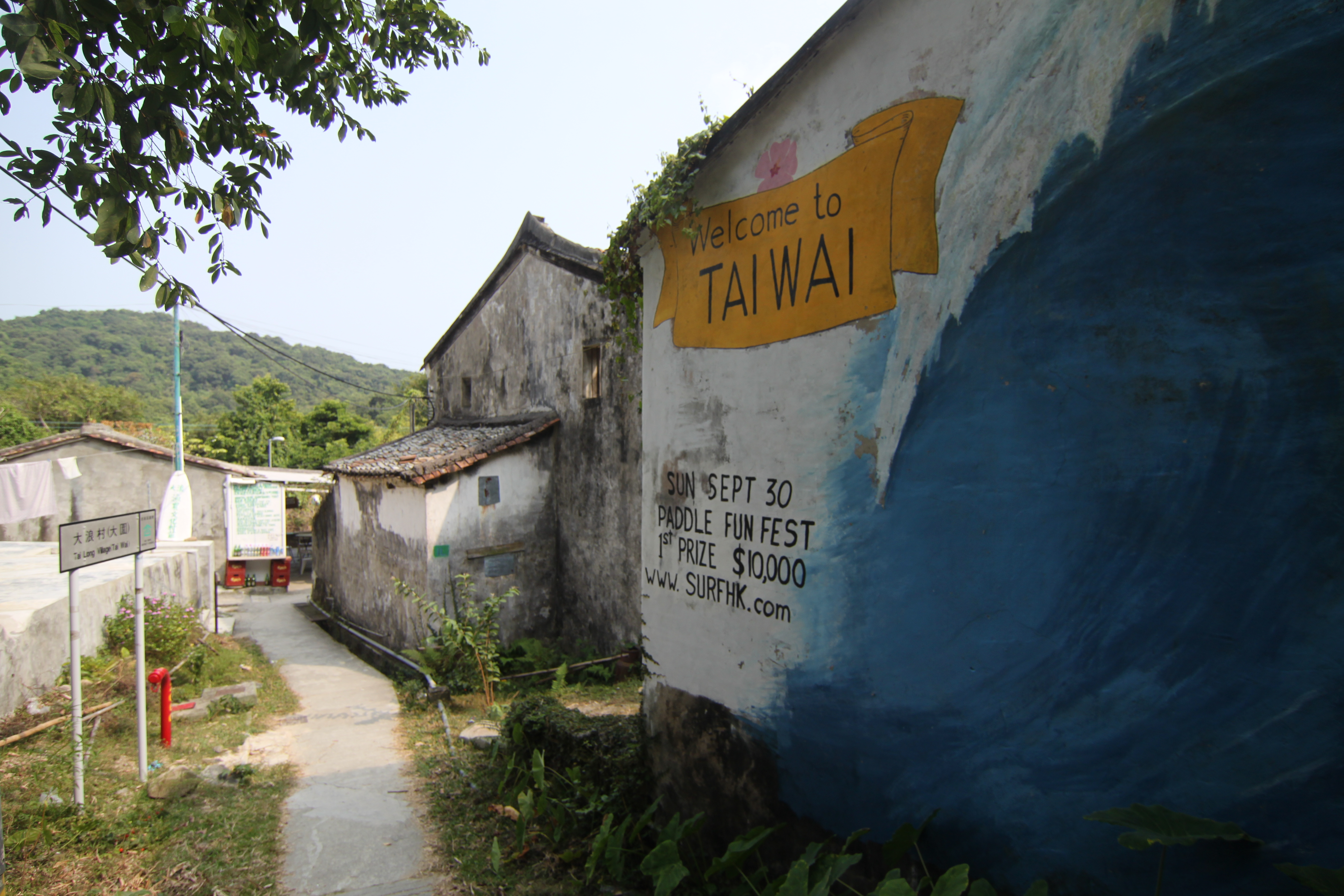
Tai Wai (大圍) section of Tai Long Tsuen.

Tai Long Wan (Chinese: 大浪灣; lit. 'Big Wave Bay') is a 3 kilometer-wide bay on the east coast of the Sai Kung Peninsula in Sai Kung District, Hong Kong. Considered one of the most beautiful places in Hong Kong, it is a popular surf destination.

== Geography ==
=== Natural formations ===
There are four main beaches along the bay:

- Sai Wan (西灣; 'West Bay'), also informally called Tai Long Sai Wan
- Ham Tin Wan (鹹田灣; 'Salty Field Bay')
- Tai Wan (大灣; 'Big Bay')
- Tung Wan (東灣; 'East Bay')

None of the beaches in the Tai Long Wan area is suitable for swimming because of the presence of strong rip currents year-round, which means swimmers could be pulled into the open sea when caught in a rip current. The beaches are not gazetted and do not offer lifeguard services or shark nets that are common elsewhere in Hong Kong. Numerous drownings have occurred over the years because of the rip currents.

Three tiny islands, Tsim Chau (尖洲), Tai Chau (大洲) and Lan Tau Pai (爛頭排), sit picturesquely near the centre of the bay.

=== Villages ===
There are several small villages in the area, including:

- Tai Long Tsuen (大浪村), the oldest one, the largest in scale
- Ham Tin Tsuen (鹹田村)
- Lam Uk Wai (林屋圍)
- Cheung Uk Wai (張屋圍)
- Tai Wan Tsuen (大灣村)

The latter three have become ruins. Tai Long, including Lam Uk and Ham Tin, are recognized villages under the New Territories Small House Policy.

== History ==
Artifacts of the Neolithic and Bronze Ages have been found in an archaeological site at Ham Tin. Tai Long Tsuen (大浪村), a village near Ham Tin Wan, was established over 250 years ago.

Tai Long Village, Lam Uk Wai, Cheung Uk Wai and Ham Tin Village are the four old villages in Ham Tin. According to the survey conducted by Antiquities and Monuments Office, the villages have more than 200 years of history and about 90% of the village houses have more than 100 years of history. The genealogy of the Li family of Tai Long Sai Wan mentions that their ancestors settled in Tai Long Wan and the surrounding areas during the period from 1465 to 1487. There were about 600 to 700 villagers living in 10 surnames, including Zhan, Zhang, Li, Dai, Kong, Lin, etc.

Tai Long Village was the largest of the four villages so the village office was set up there. It is lucky to see that there is a village that still retains the traditional architectural structure so completely in Hong Kong. For Ham Tin Village, the surname of the villagers is mainly Wan. The villagers have stayed in Ham Tin for 7 to 8 generations and most of the buildings were built in the pre-war period. Lam Uk Wai and Cheung Uk Wai were on a smaller scale so they have been left abandoned, and part of them was covered by plants for a period of time.

The four villages were once a big village group and the villagers were mainly farmers and fishermen. Most of the villagers moved out to the urban area to make a better living during the industrial development period of Hong Kong since there was a lack of job opportunities in the villages and the transportation was inconvenient. Along with the lower population, the villages became deserted.

=== Tai Long Village ===
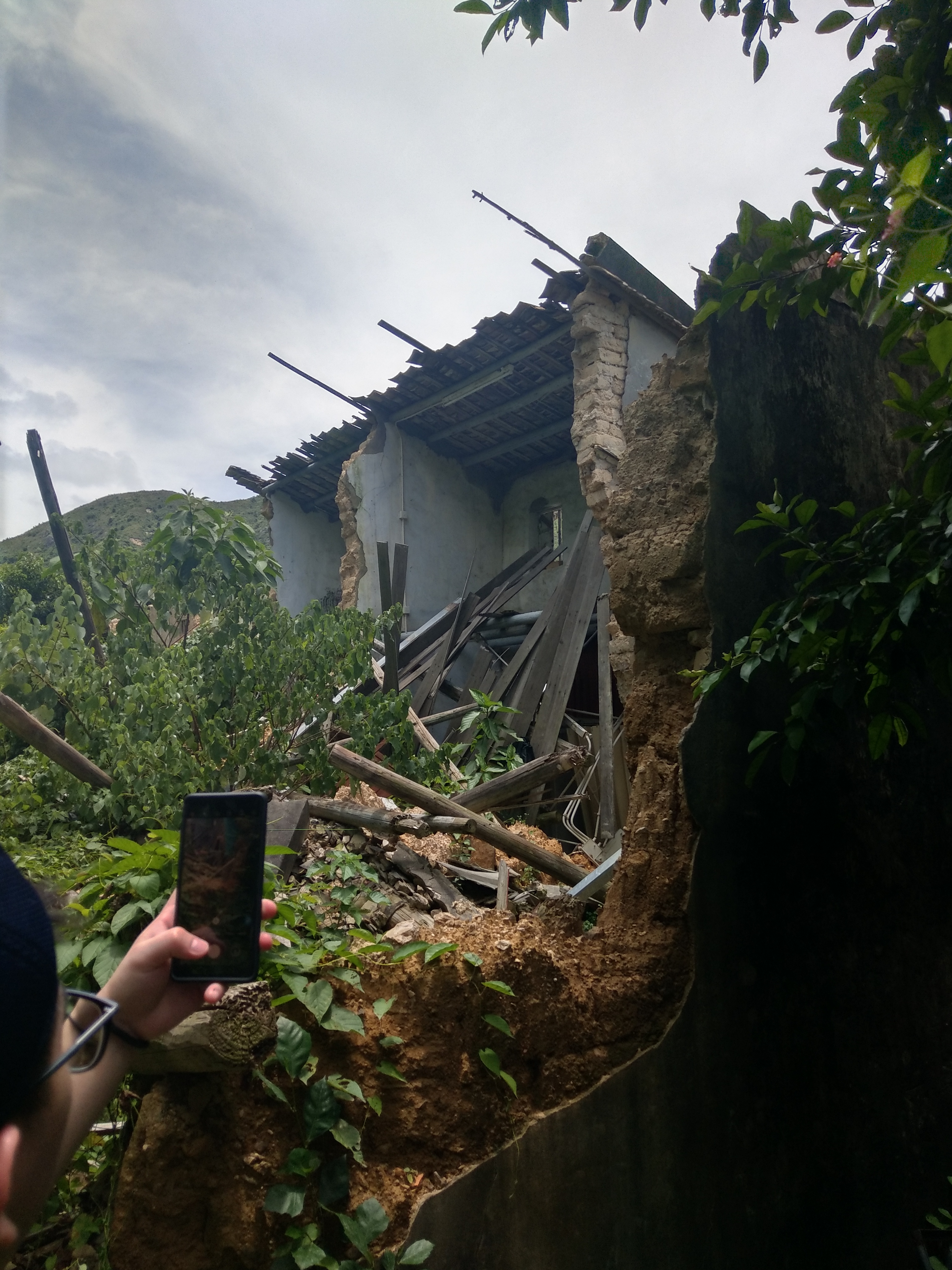
A collapsed old village house in Tai Long Village.

Tai Long Village has a history of 250 years and is the oldest village in the area of Tai Long in Sai Kung East, facing Tai Long Wan. In the past, the people in Tai Long mainly relied on fishing and farming (e.g. rice and sugarcane) to earn a living. Lives were simple and tough; many of them walked 4 or 5 hours to Ngau Chi Wan in Kowloon in order to sell their crops and fish. Some of them transported timber to Shau Kei Wan and Aberdeen by boat and sold them in exchange for daily necessities. Today, Tai Long still does not have a ferry pier. The villagers are of several surnames, namely, Chan, Cheung, Cham, Tai, Lai and Ngai. The ancestor of the Cham clan, Cham Kai-ming, came from Xintang in Guangdong province and settled in Tai Long Tsuen during the Qing dynasty. Xin’an County Gazetter records that Tai Long Village came under the management of Guanfu magistrate. Nowadays, many villagers in Tai Long Tsuen have emigrated to Britain and there are only less than 10 villagers in total.

== Geology ==
Columnar-jointed volcanic rocks characterize the coastline in the south of Tai Long Wan, formed by the cooling and contraction of hot ash during the volcanic eruption in Cretaceous Period. Cliffs in Tai Long Wan are formed in the columnar-joint fine-grained tuffs. These give rise to high, steep cliffs that are commonly penetrated by sea caves and natural sea arches.

== Conservation ==
Tai Long Wan is located within the Sai Kung East Country Park. It was declared a Site of Special Scientific Interest in 1979. It also forms an important part of Hong Kong Global Geopark, High Island volcanic rock region.

The Immaculate Conception Chapel in Tai Long Tsuen has been listed as a Grade III historic building.

== Religion ==
Starting from the 1860s, Catholic missionaries entered the villages and assisted villagers. They provided assistance and helping hands that improved the livelihood of villagers, including offering material and medical help. In the 19th century, malaria and smallpox were critical diseases which threatened the life of people, especially children. The missionaries helped in the prevention of these diseases. Apart from providing medical treatments to the residents, they also offered some necessities such as food to the residents. After building up a good relationship with the residents, the missionaries tried to spread religious belief and practices among the village. The villagers were grateful for their work and most of them were baptized as Catholic. A religious atmosphere was gradually spread through the village in this period of time. A Catholic church of The Immaculate Conception which was rebuilt in 1931 was used for teaching, worshiping and religious ceremonies. A Sister House was built nearby the church so that the sisters can visit and live among the villagers with convenience. Missionaries were also responsible for holding weddings when couples got married and funerals when someone died.

== Notable buildings ==
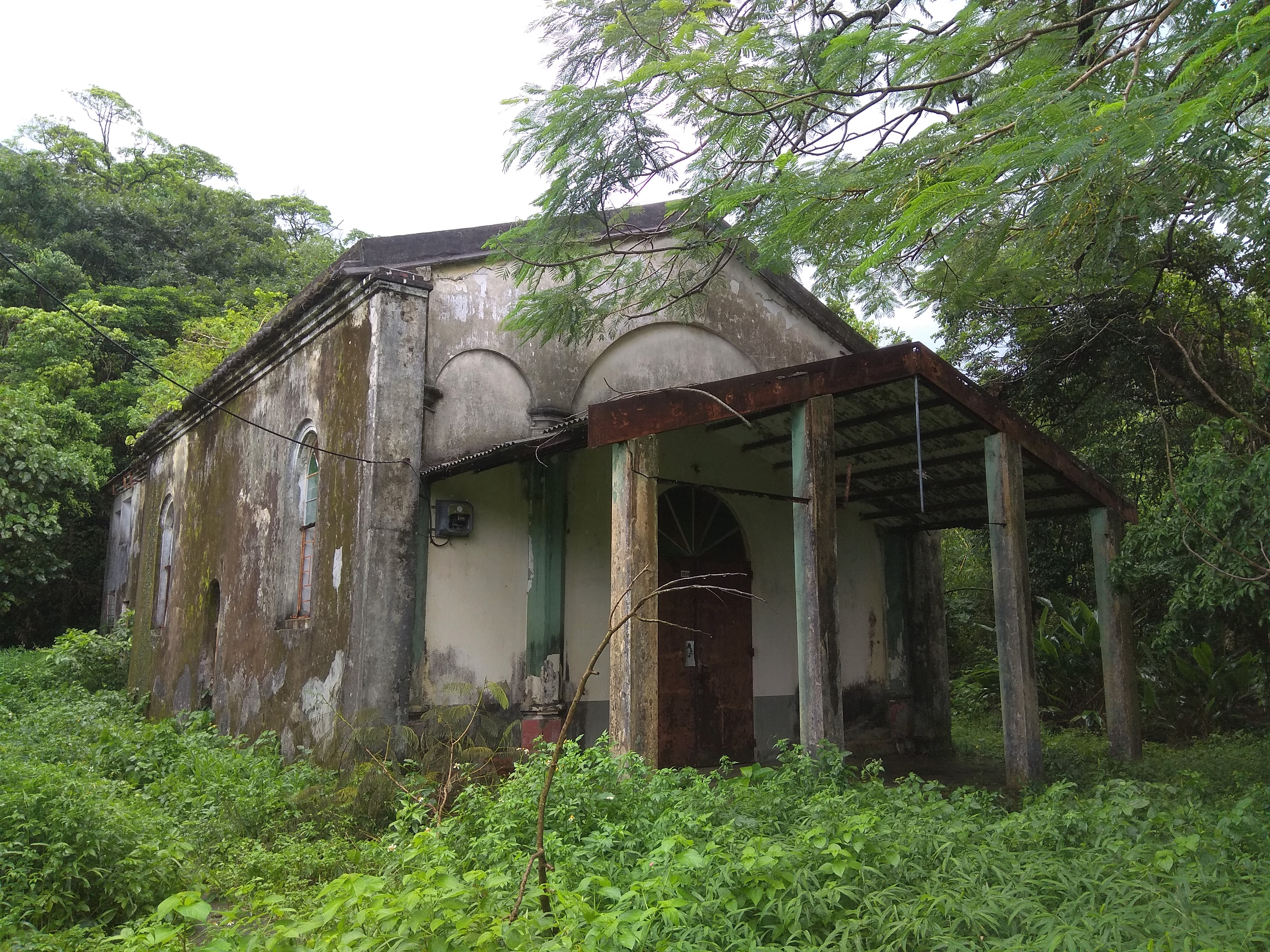
Immaculate Conception Chapel in Tai Long Tsuen.

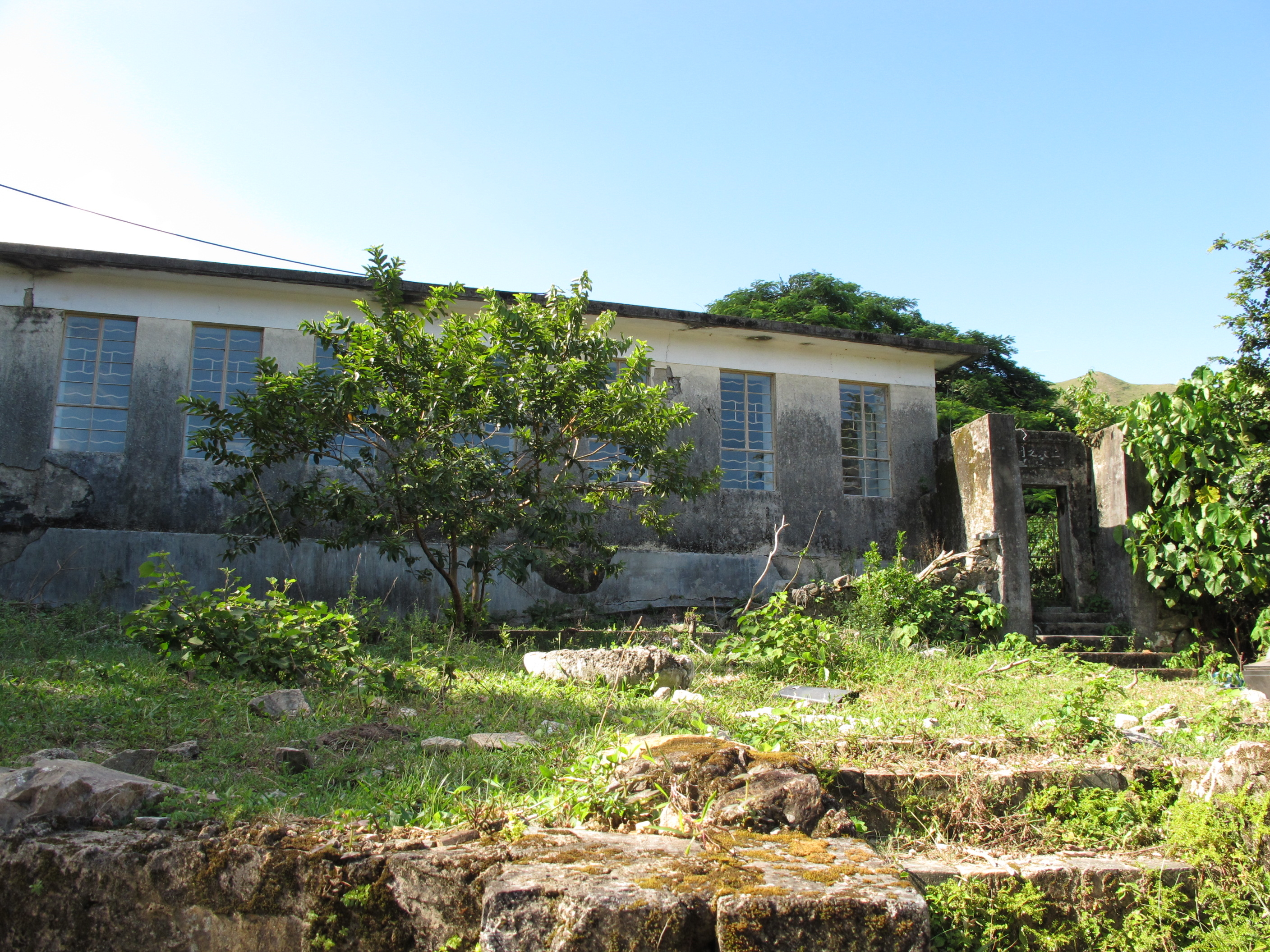
Yuk Ying School.

=== Immaculate Conception Chapel ===
The Immaculate Conception Chapel (聖母無原罪小堂) in Tai Long Village, originally founded in 1867 and named Holy Family Chapel, is one of the historic churches of Sai Kung Peninsula. It has been listed as a Grade III historical building.

At the beginning, many of the indigenous were fishermen and worshiped Tin Hau (Mazu). Missionaries then arrived at Sai Kung and offered help to the villagers. For 6 years of time, the number of followers has rapidly increased, therefore, the church was rehabilitated and it has expanded its capacity to hold about 200 to 300 people, which was one third of the original capacity.

In the 1950s, the population of the villages was at its peak of 600 to 700 villagers, and over 500 people were Catholics. The church had become the largest Catholic church in the area, which had the greatest number of followers in Sai Kung. Therefore, Tai Long Village was once regarded as one of the missionary bases in earlier Hong Kong.

The existing chapel was built in 1931 and was renamed as Immaculate Conception Chapel in 1954 under the management of another Holy Family Chapel in Chek Keng. In 1979, Hong Kong was hit by Typhoon Hope and the chapel was damaged again. The diocese then decided to renovate the chapel and demolish the original clock tower. However, villagers have started to move out to urban areas or immigrate overseas since the 1960s and the number of followers going to the chapel kept decreasing. The chapel was reopened in 1981 and closed in 1988 at last.

But still, whenever a Catholic of the village passes away, priests will return to the chapel and host a mass for them.

=== Yuk Ying School ===
Yuk Ying School (育英學校) was the only primary school in the village. it is located next to the Immaculate Conception Chapel and was closed together with the chapel in 1988.

In the past, it was inconvenient to transport to the city centre. To educate the children in the villages, who could not go to schools in the urban city, the Yuk Ying School was set up during the early post-war period in Hong Kong, under the assistance of missionaries. Later on, the number of students studying in the school decreased gradually due to the reduced population in the villages, and the school has stopped its service since 1988.

== Access ==
Section 2 of the Maclehose Trail, one of the most popular hiking trails in Hong Kong, runs through impressive peaks, uplands, peninsulas and bays around Tai Long Wan.

== See also ==
- Historic churches of Sai Kung
- Beaches of Hong Kong
