= Sai Wan Shan (Chai Wan) =

Hill of Hong Kong

- 西灣山
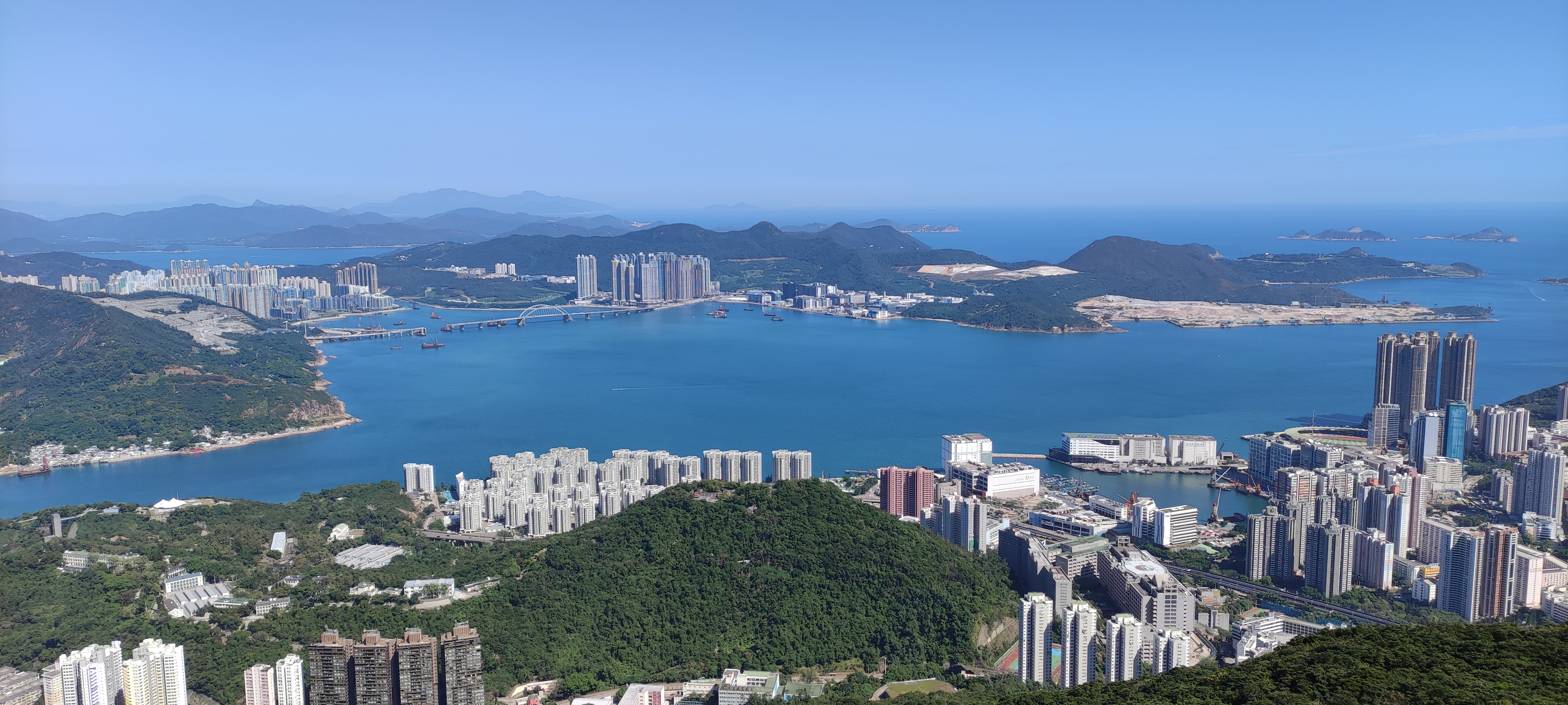

Highest point
- Elevation: 197 m (646 ft)
- Coordinates: 22°16′21″N 114°14′07″E

Geography
- Location within Hong Kong
- Location: Chai Wan, Hong Kong

Sai Wan Shan (Chinese: 西灣山) is a hill in northern Hong Kong Island. It has a height of 197 metres (646 ft) above sea level. The hill is the site of former military installations used by the British Colonial administration. Now, the installations have been turned into a leisure facility called Lei Yue Mun Park and Holiday Village.

== See also ==
- List of mountains, peaks and hills in Hong Kong
- Chai Wan
