= Walled villages of Hong Kong =

Housing structure found in Hong Kong

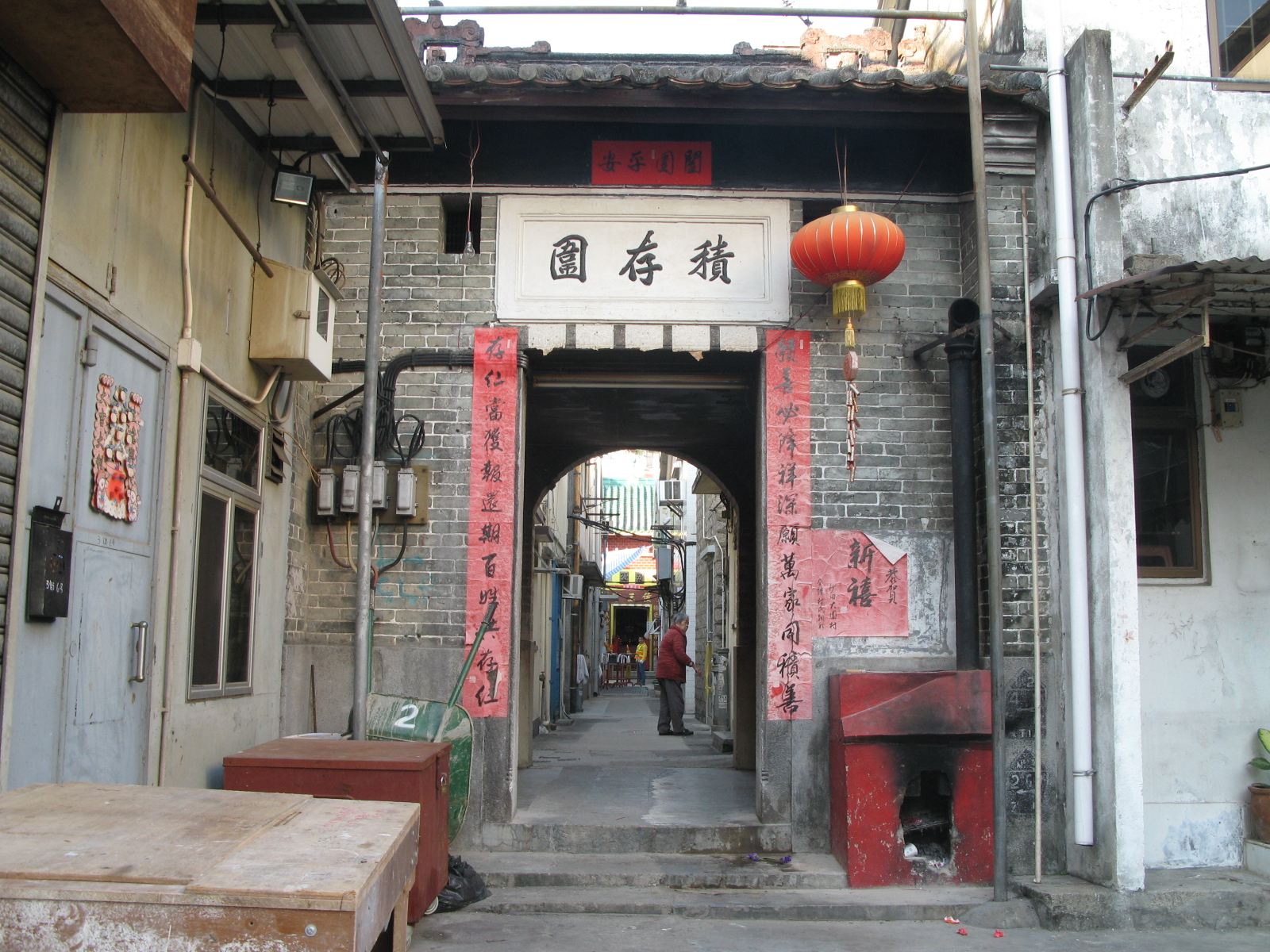
Main entrance of Tai Wai Village.

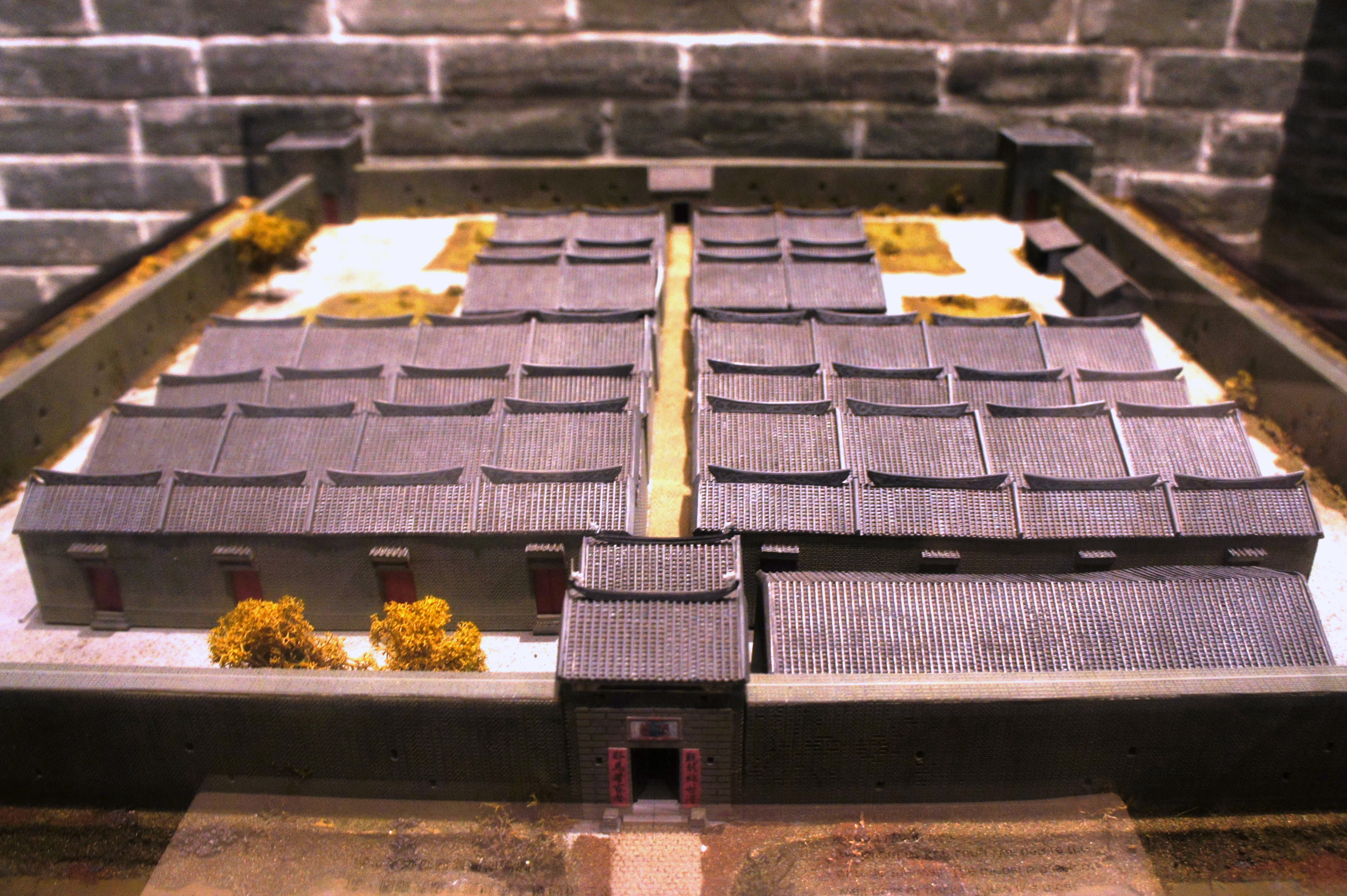
Model of San Wai (新圍) aka. Kun Lung Wai (覲龍圍), displayed in Hong Kong Heritage Museum.

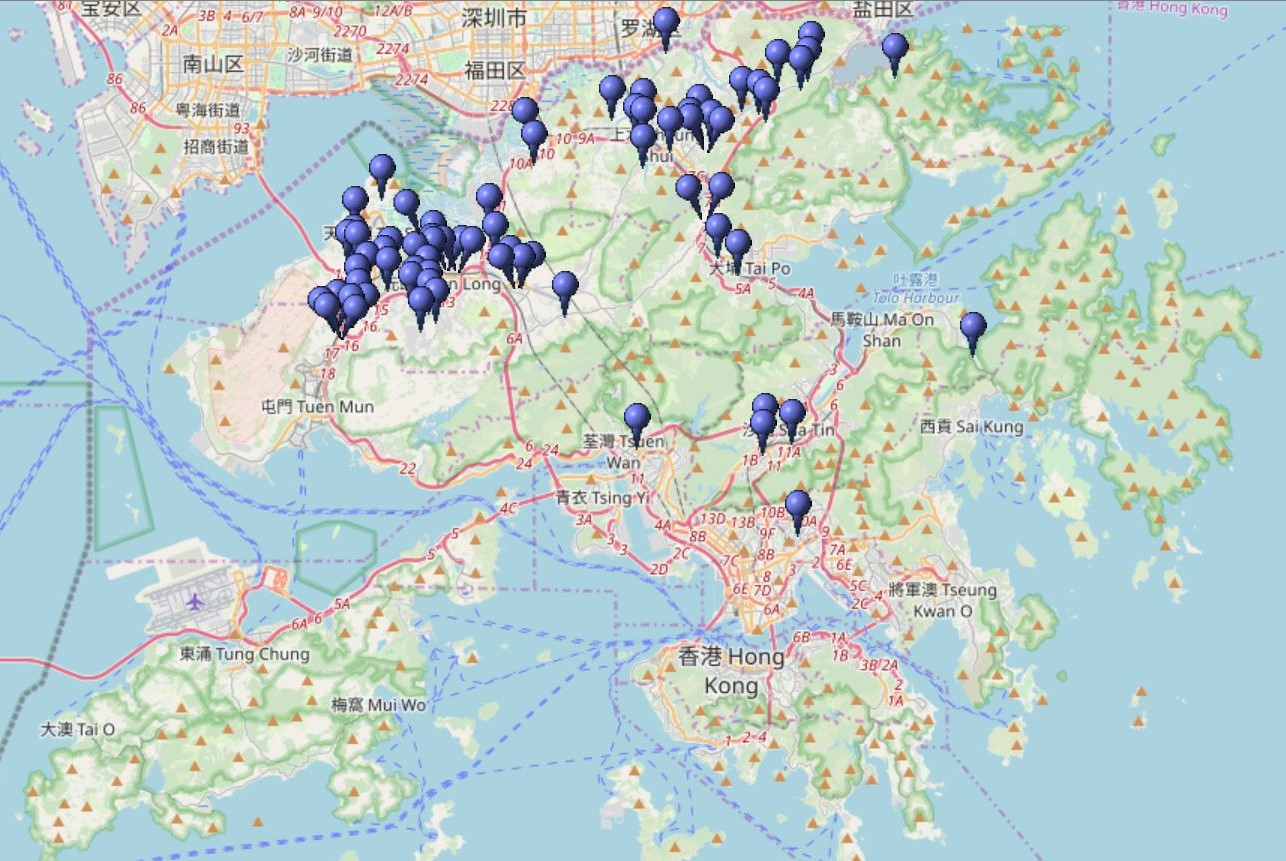
Location of walled villages in Hong Kong

There are about 70-80 walled villages in Hong Kong. Most of the walled villages of Hong Kong are located in the New Territories. Punti walled villages are occupied by a clan of typically one surname, while Hakka walled villages can be occupied by people of different surnames. Walled villages of Hong Kong typically have watchtowers at the four corners and contain an ancestral hall.

== History ==
During the Ming and Qing dynasties, coastal areas in Guangdong experienced numerous attacks from pirates. The area of present-day Hong Kong was particularly vulnerable to such incursions. The area's winding shores, hilly land, and islands, as well as its distance from administrative centres, made the territory of Hong Kong an excellent hideout for pirates. Villages, both Punti and Hakka, built walls against them. Some villages even protected themselves with cannons. Over time, the walls of most walled villages have been partly or totally demolished.

== Names ==
In Punti Cantonese, wai (圍, 'walled') and tsuen (村, 'village') were once synonyms. Most place names which include the word wai were at some point in time a walled village.

== Conservation ==
Two heritage trails of Hong Kong feature walled villages:

- Ping Shan Heritage Trail. One walled village: Sheung Cheung Wai (上璋圍).
- Lung Yeuk Tau Heritage Trail. Five walled villages: Lo Wai (老圍), Ma Wat Wai (麻笏圍), San Wai (新圍, also called Kun Lung Wai 覲龍圍), Tung Kok Wai (東閣圍, also known as Ling Kok Wai), Wing Ning Wai (永寧圍).

== Features ==
Walled villages in Hong Kong are characterised by row houses arranged in a square or rectangular block, where the parallel rows of houses are separated by narrow lanes.

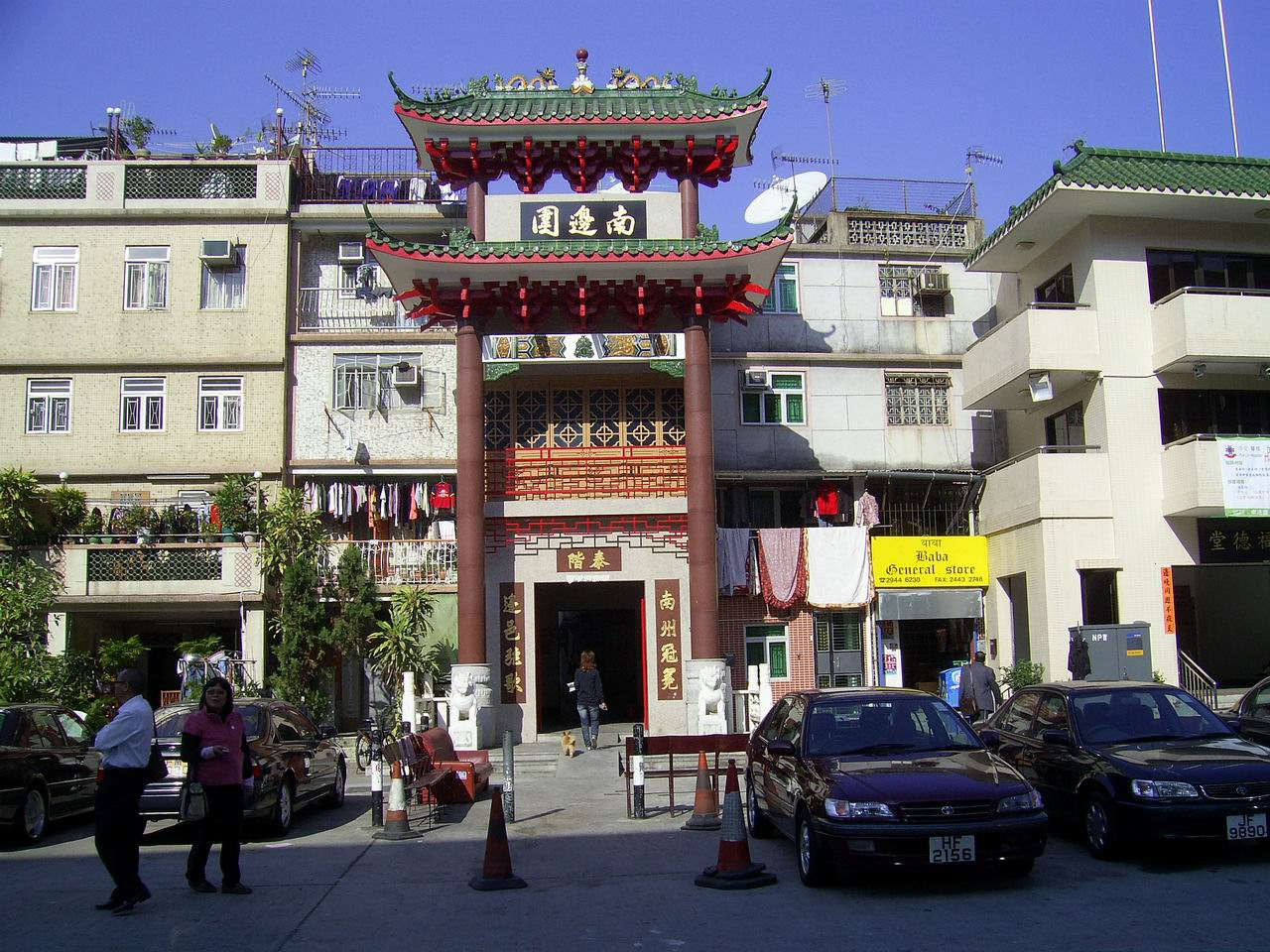
Entrance gate of Nam Pin Wai

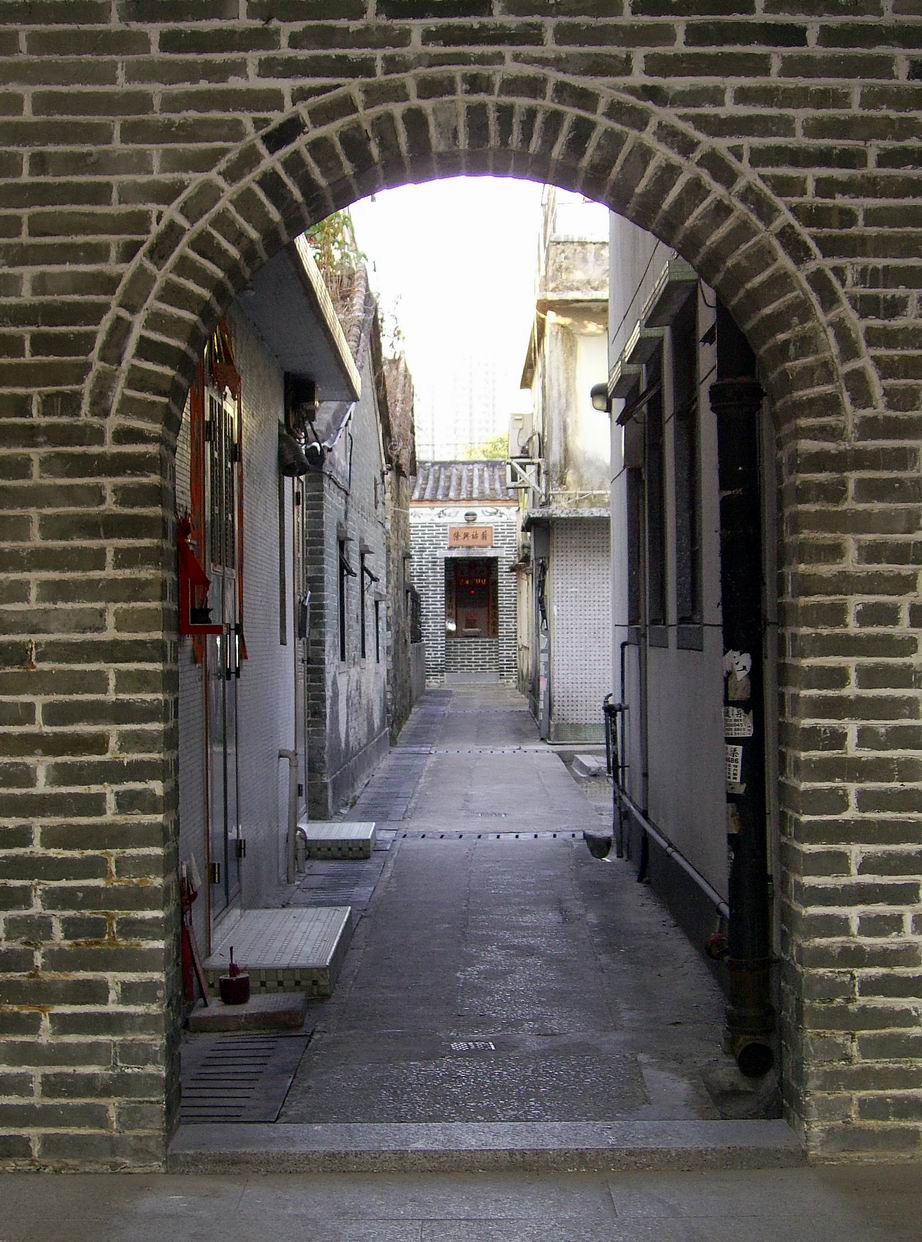
Central axis of Sheung Cheung Wai

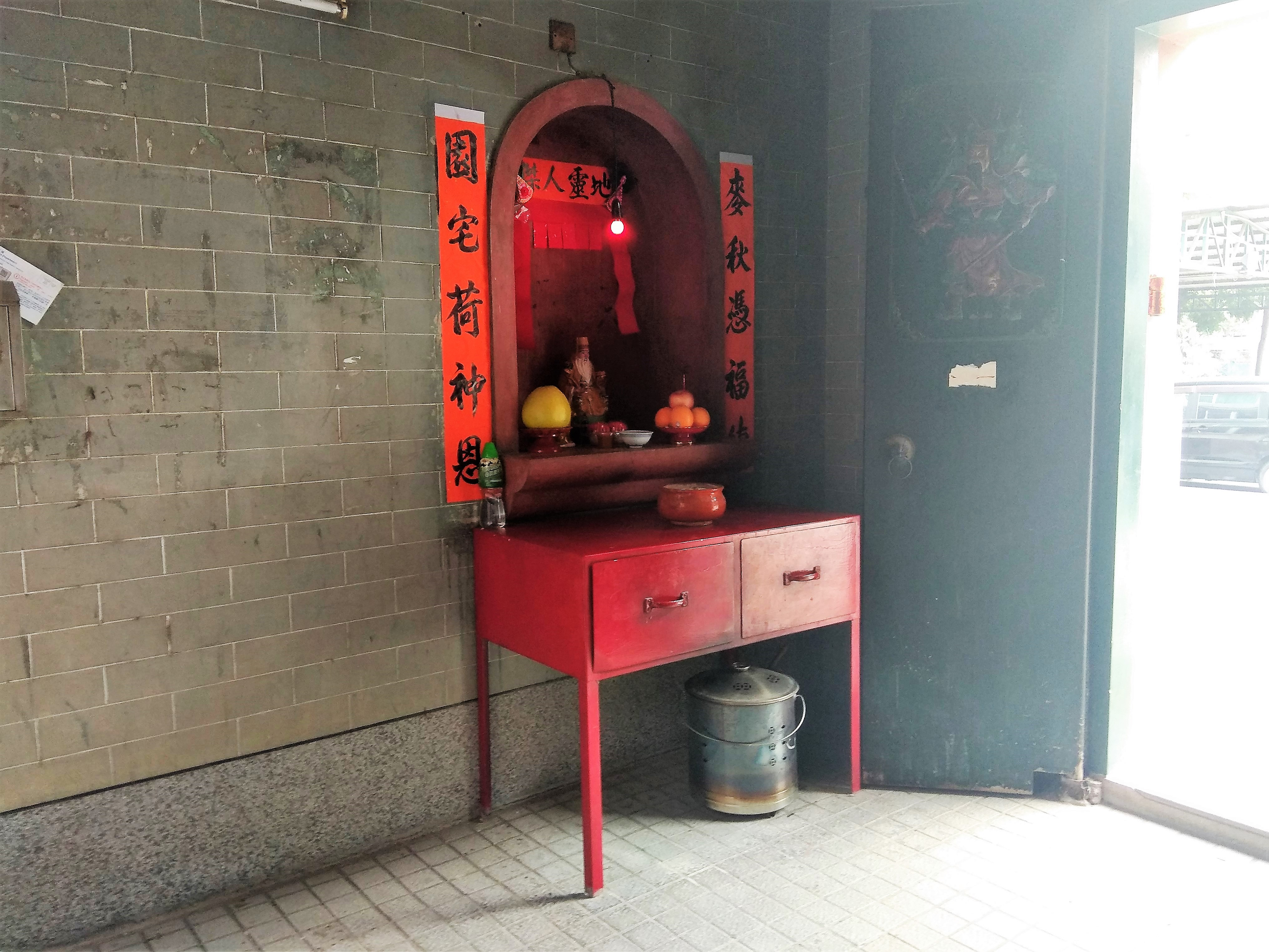
Tu Di Gong shrine within the entrance gate of Tsing Chuen Wai

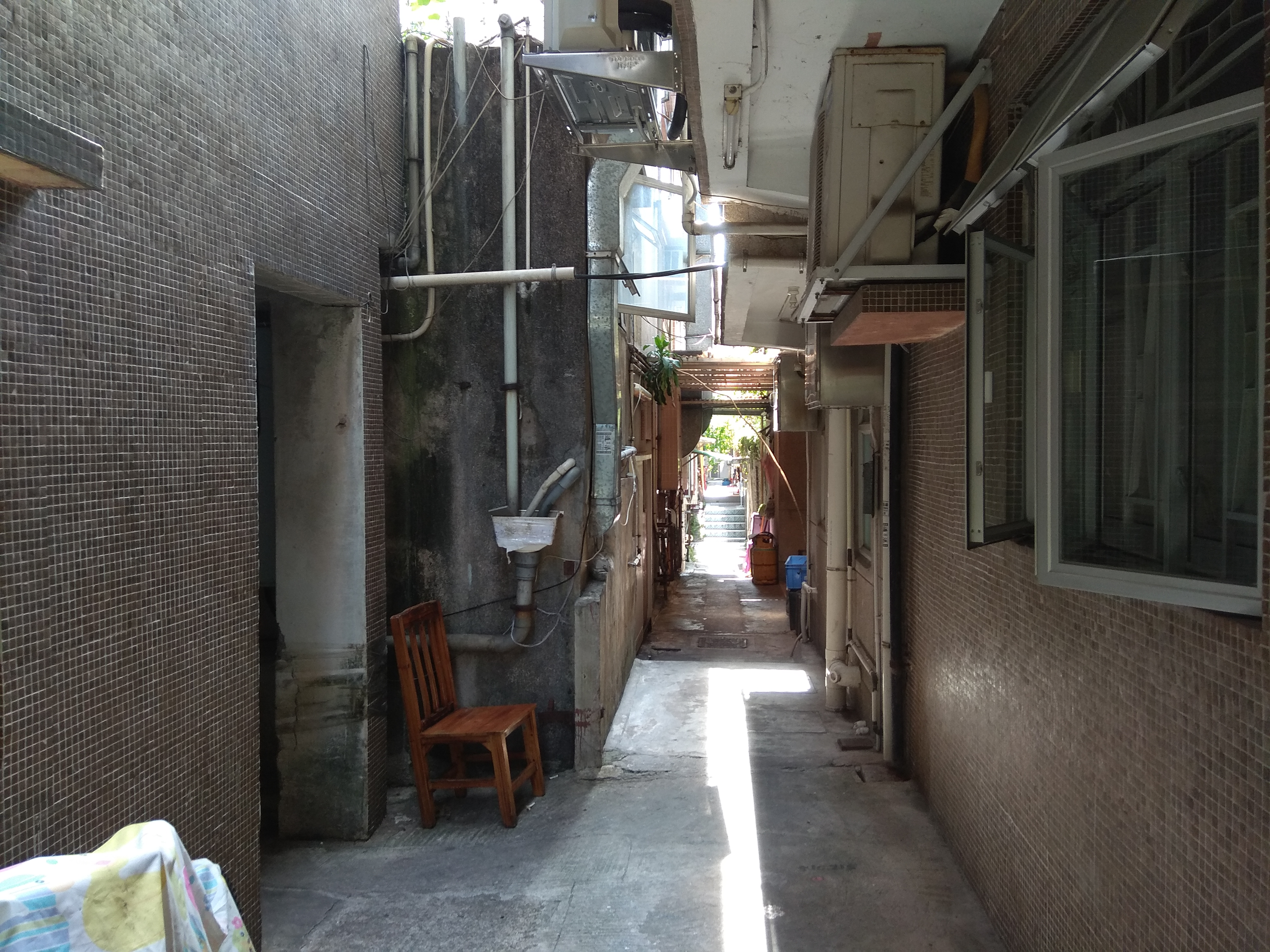
A narrow lane in Lam Tei Tsuen, typical of Hong Kong walled villages

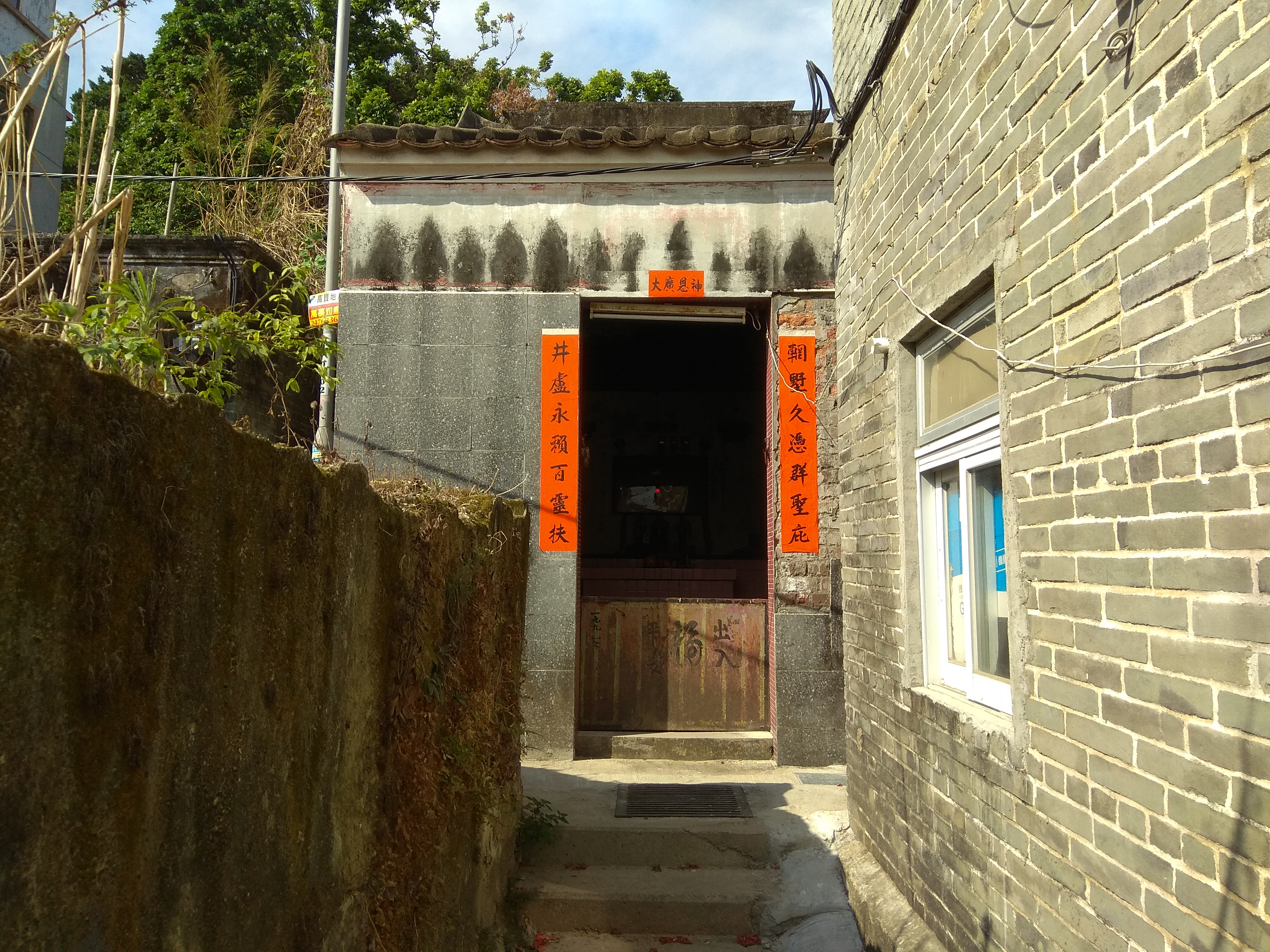
Village shrine of Mong Tseng Wai, at the end of the central axis
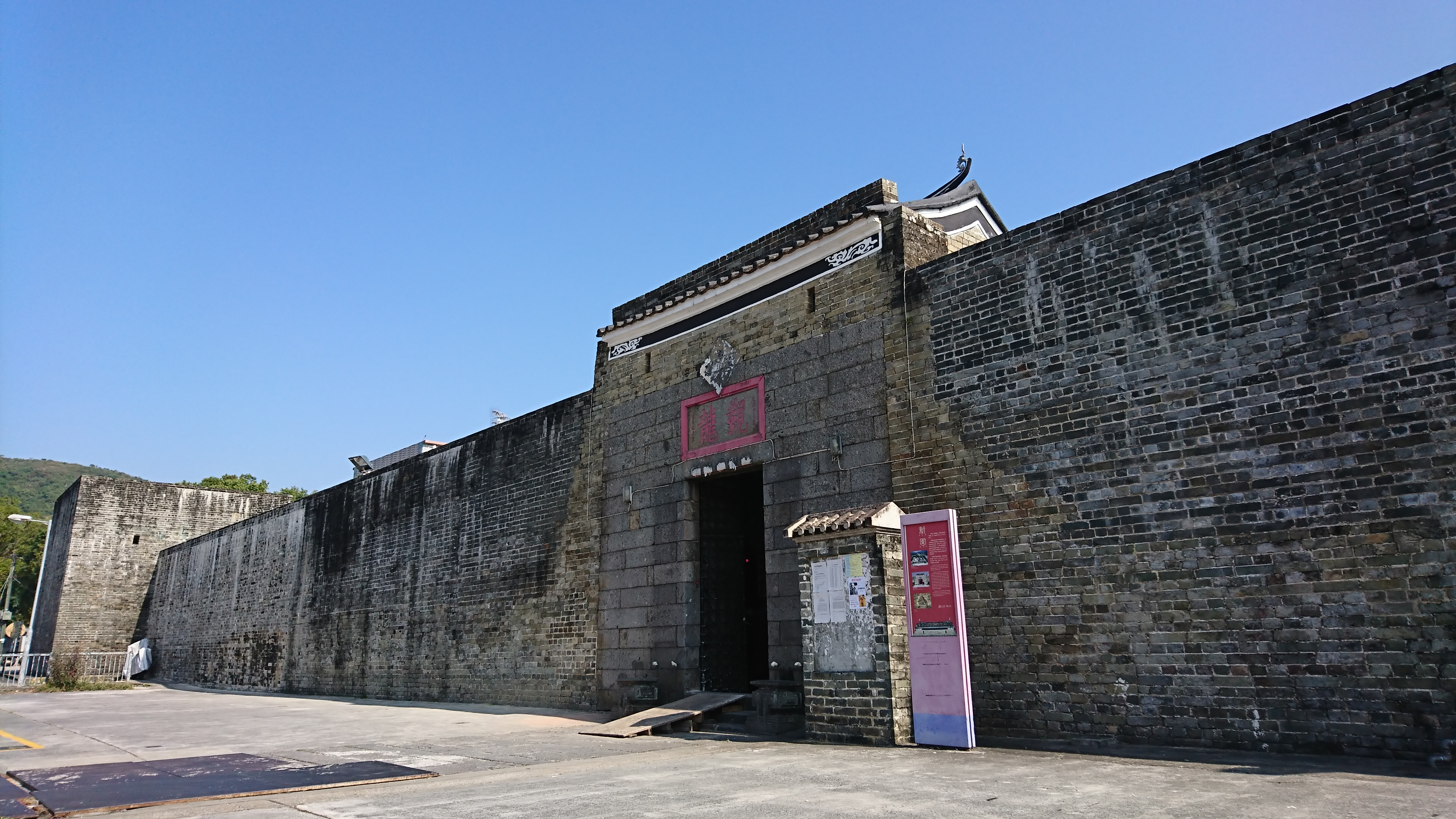
Wall of San Wai aka. Kun Lung Wai

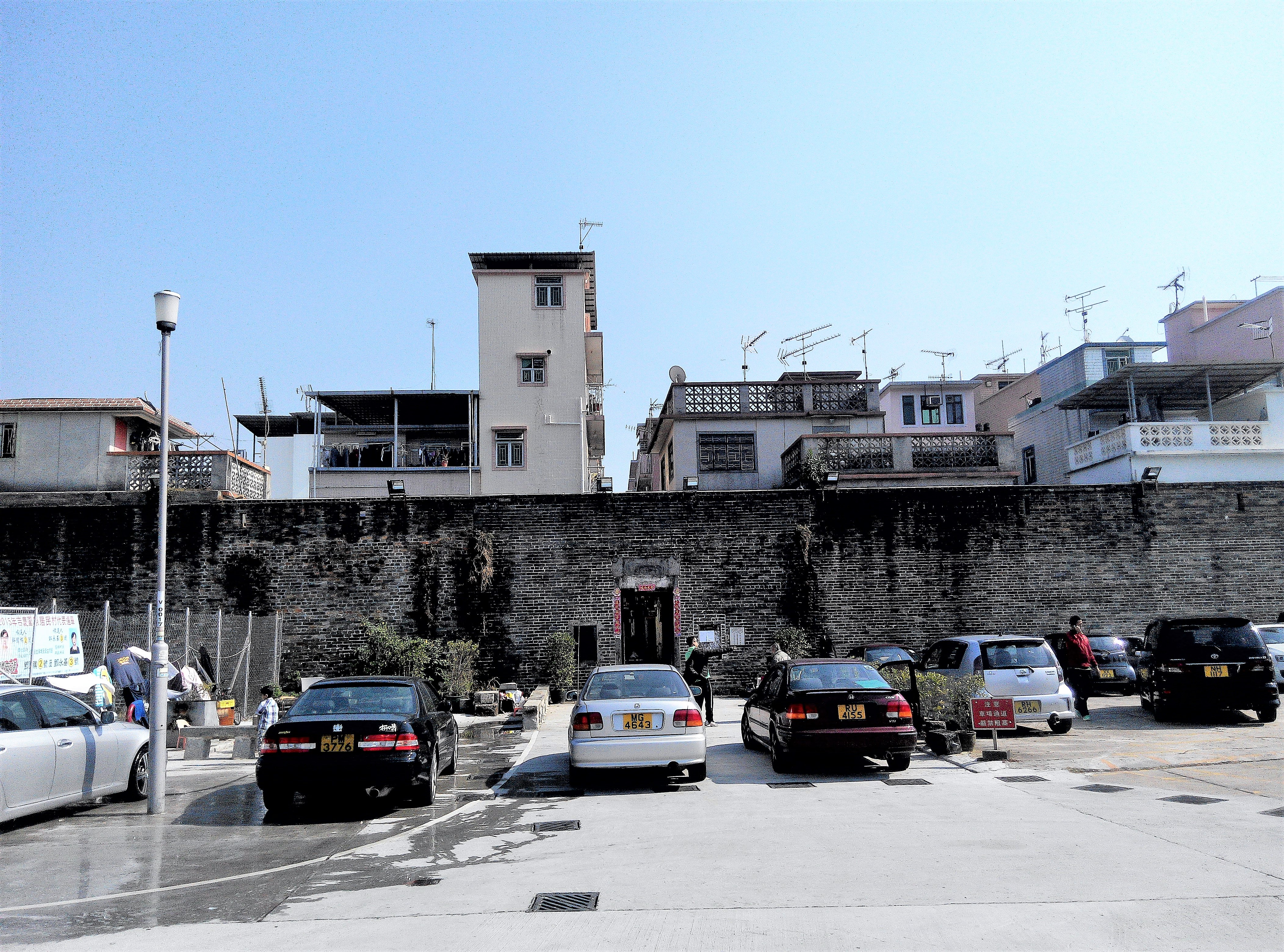
Wall of Kat Hing Wai

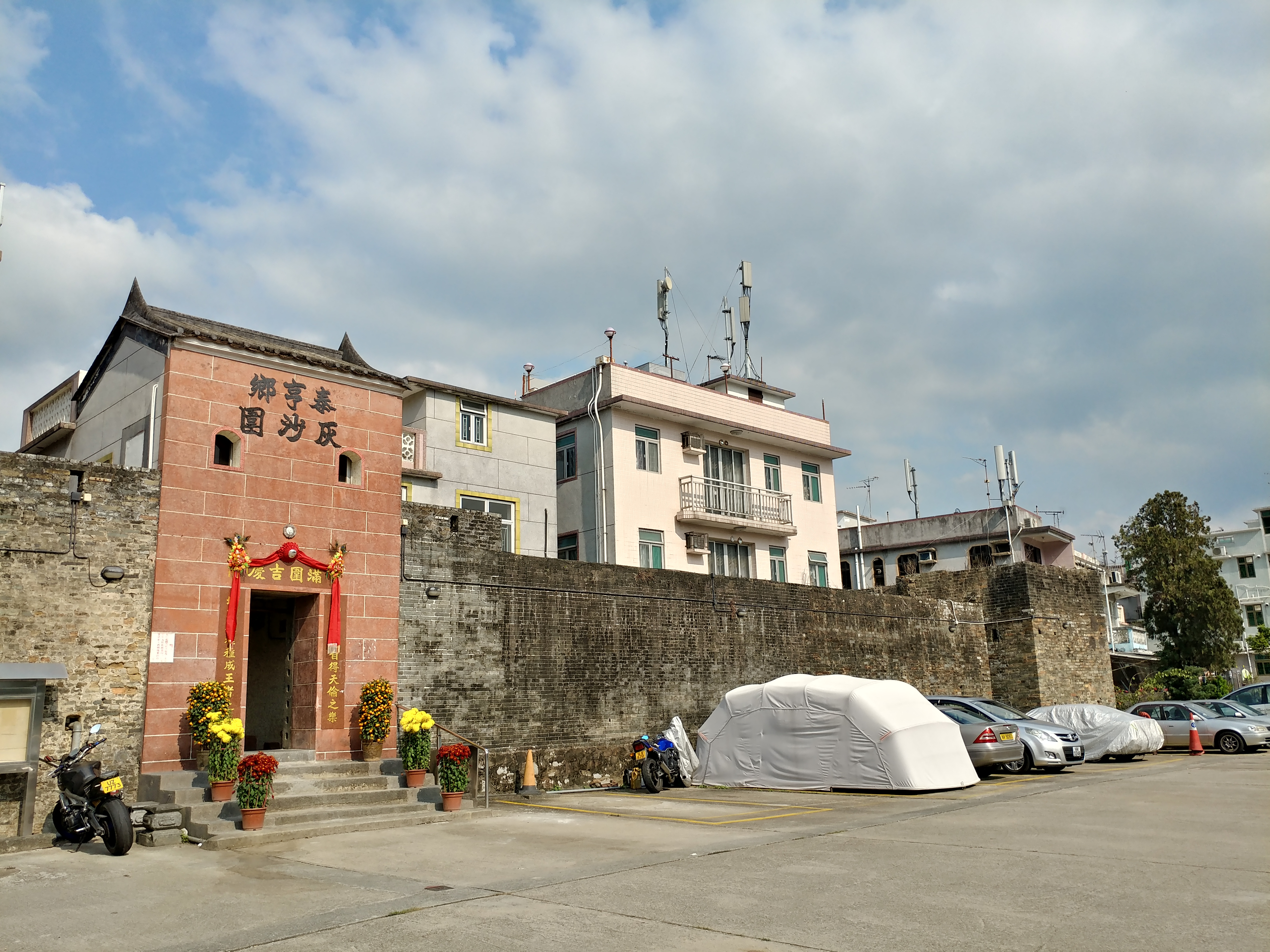
Wall of Fui Sha Wai, Tai Hang

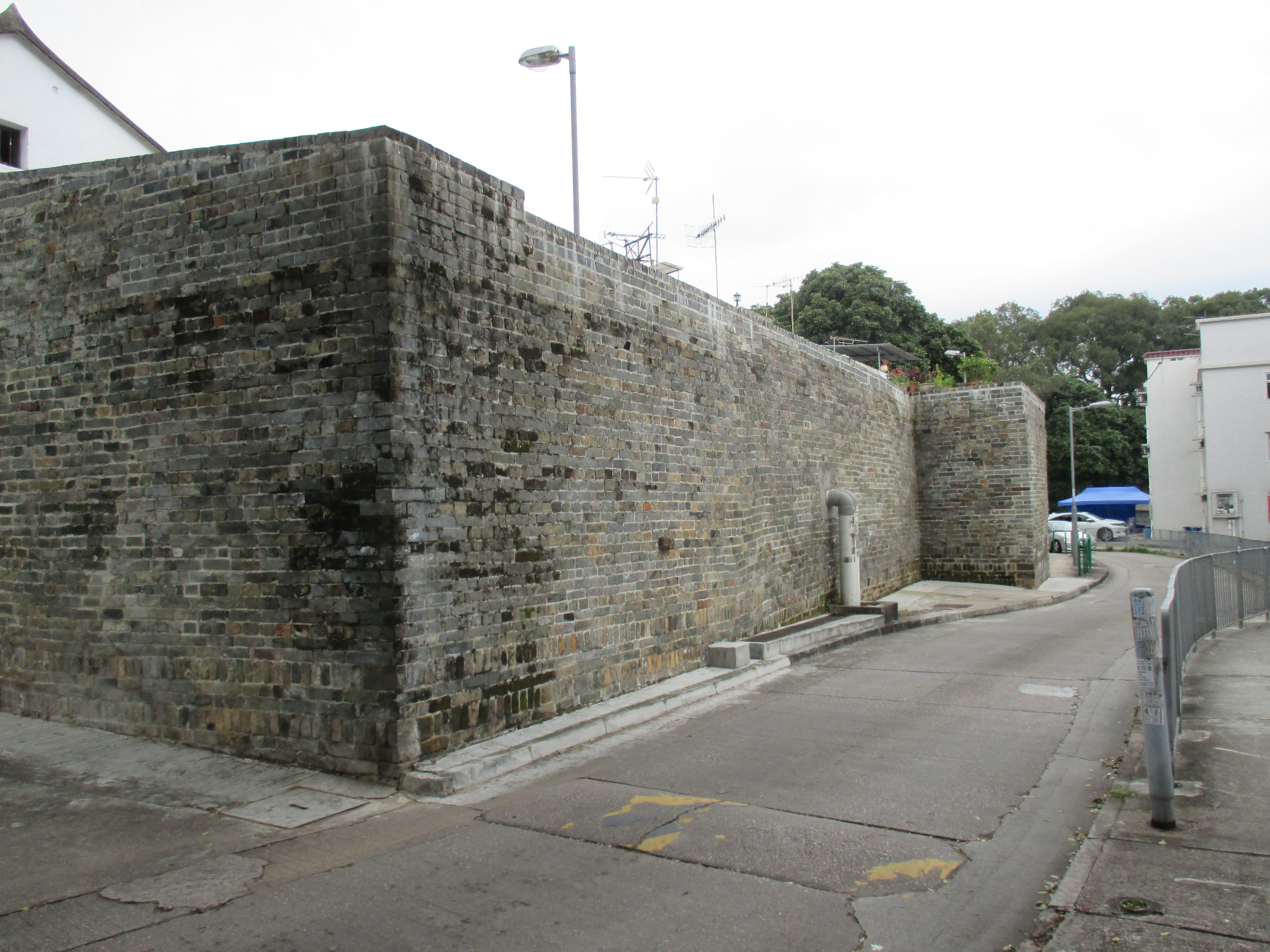
Wall of Lo Wai

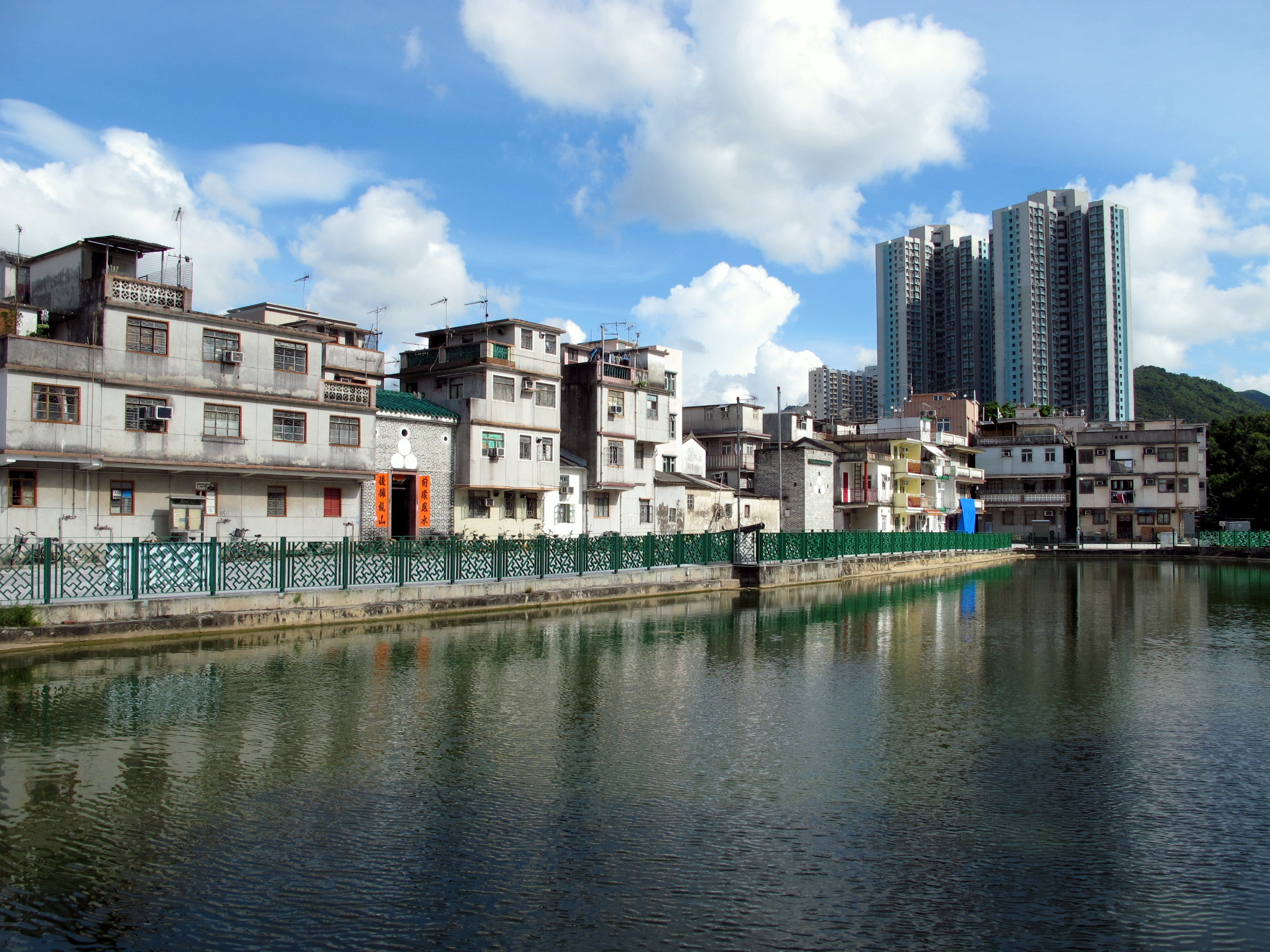
Village pond of Fanling Ching Wai

== Notable walled villages ==
=== Kat Hing Wai ===
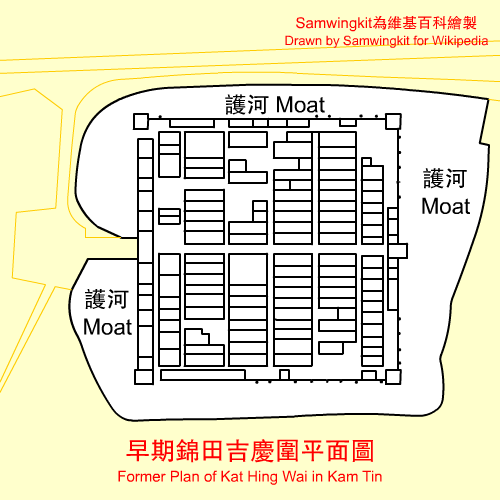
Historic plan of Kat Hing Wai walled village in Kam Tin.

Kat Hing Wai (吉慶圍) is a noted Punti walled village in Yuen Long District of Hong Kong. It often mistakenly believed to be Hakka, whose people have similar traditions. However the Punti people were from Southern China and the first to settle in Hong Kong. Kat Hing Wai's residents speak Cantonese, rather than Hakka. Popularly known as Kam Tin, from the name of the area, it is home to about 400 descendants of the Tang Clan, who built the village back in the 17th century.

Kat Hing Wai is a rectangular (100 m x 90 m) walled village. As a family stronghold, Kat Hing Wai has served the Tangs well through the centuries, protecting the residents against bandits, rival clans, and wild tigers. During the Qing dynasty, a five-metre high blue brick wall and four cannon towers were added to defend against bandits. Today, the village is still completely surrounded by 18-inch-thick walls, outside which are the remains of a moat. However, most houses within the walls have been rebuilt in recent years. There is only one narrow entrance, with a pair of iron gates.

=== Tsang Tai Uk ===
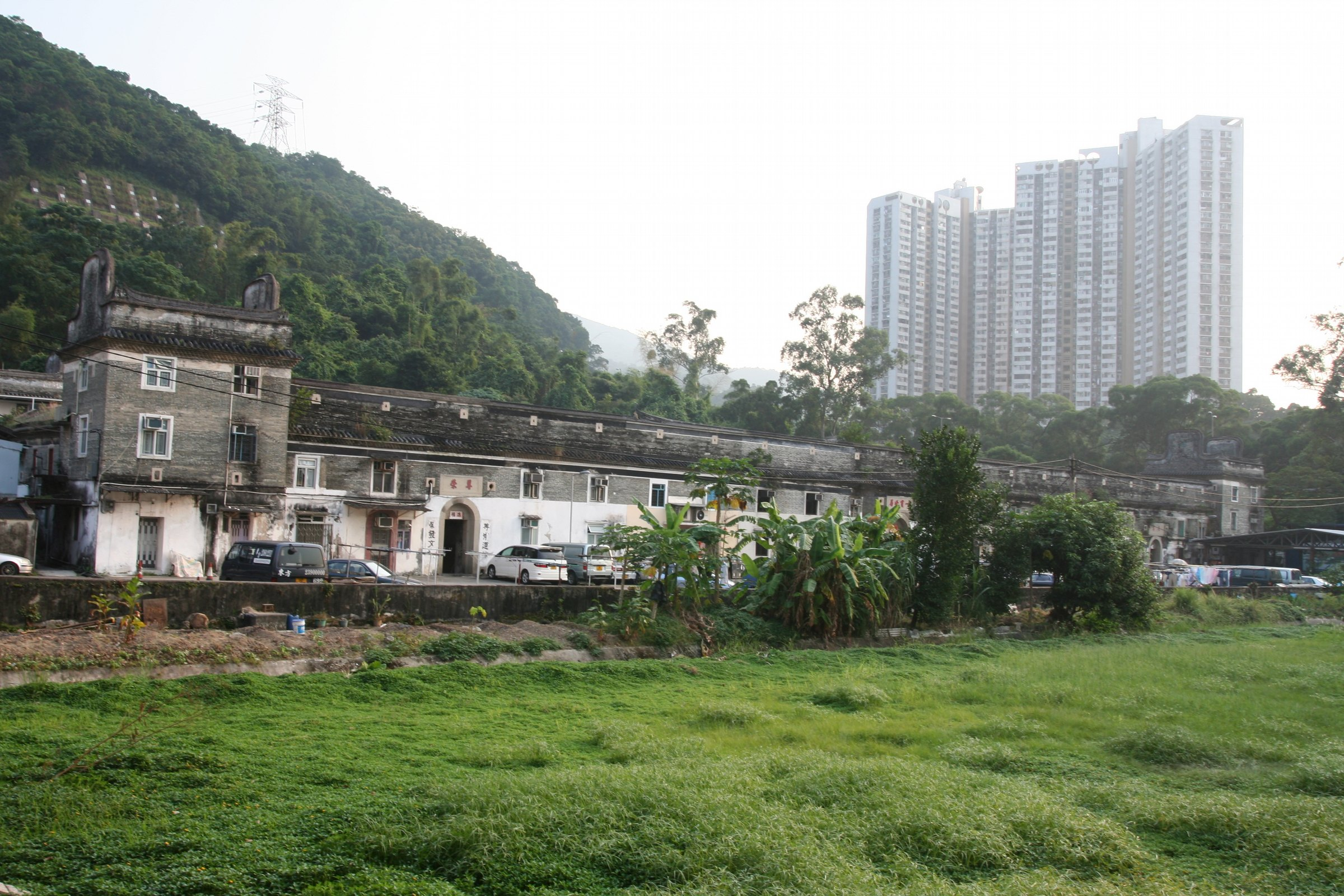
External view of Tsang Tai Uk.

Tsang Tai Uk (曾大屋), also known as Shan Ha Wai (山下圍), is another well-known Hakka walled village in Hong Kong, and one of the best preserved. It is located in Sha Tin, close to the south of the Pok Hong Estate, not far from the Lion Rock Tunnel Road. Built as a stronghold for the Tsang Clan, its construction started in 1847 and took around 20 years to complete. The village is built with granite, grey bricks, and solid timber.

=== Sheung Shui Wai ===
Sheung Shui Wai (上水圍), also known as Sheung Shui Heung (上水鄉), is one of the very few rural settlements having retained its original moat which was built in 1646. Characterized by its magnificent moat and landscape setting, the walled village is the core of the Liu clan, of which ancestors came originally from Fujian during the Yuan dynasty (1271–1368). The village is located in Sheung Shui.

=== Fanling Wai ===
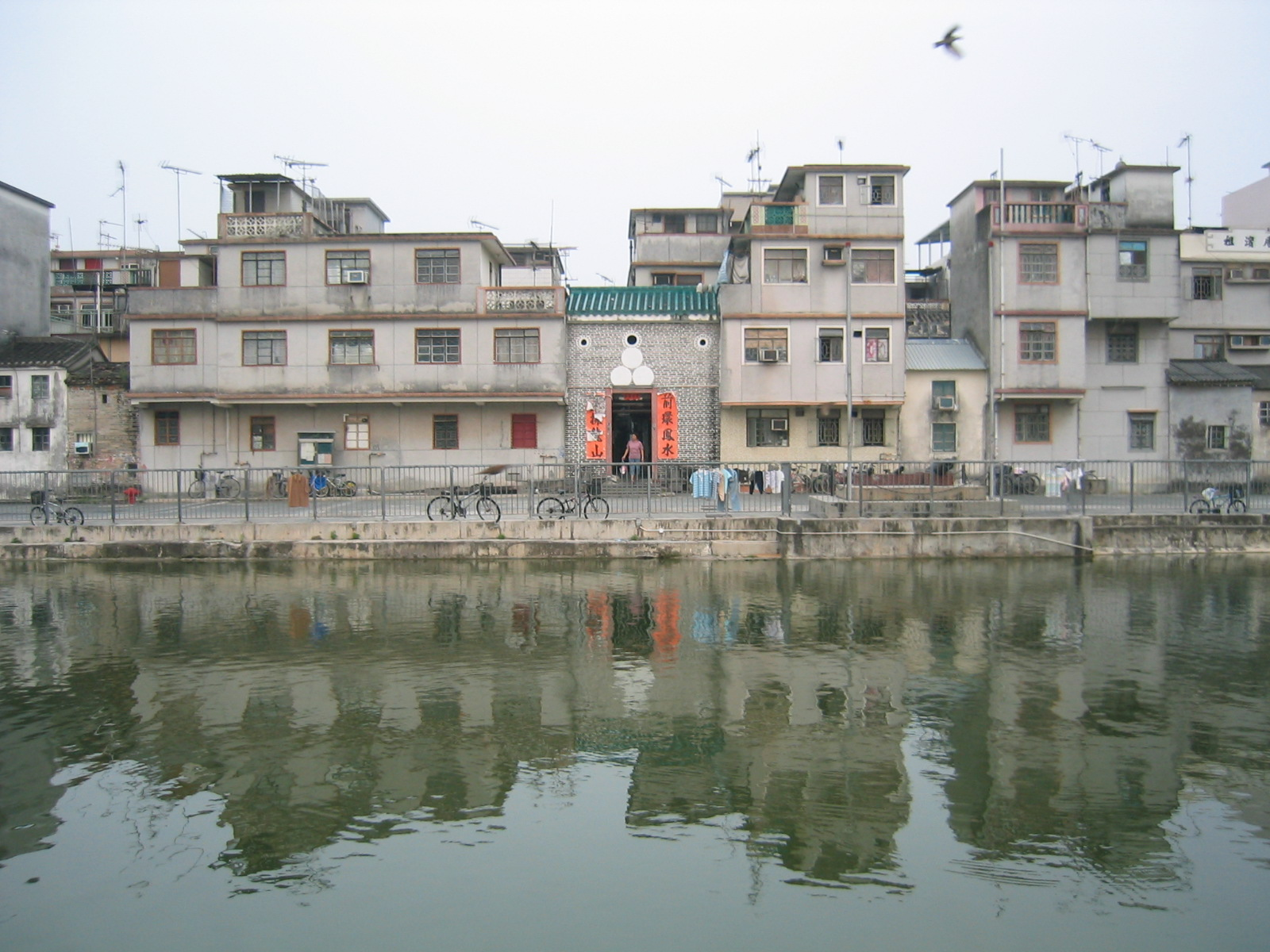
Houses reflecting in a pond at Fanling Wai.

Fanling Wai (粉嶺圍) is a walled village in Fanling built by the Pang (彭) Clan. It is recognisable with the distinctive pond and layout including features such as cannons and watchtowers. All these elements were crafted to form an integral part of the village setting. Fanling Wai is the centre of the Pang Clan who arrived in Hong Kong late during the Song dynasty.

=== Nga Tsin Wai Tsuen ===
Nga Tsin Wai Tsuen (衙前圍村) is a walled village in Wong Tai Sin, New Kowloon. It is the only walled village left in the urban built-up areas of Hong Kong. Nga Tsin Wai Tsuen is also the only remaining walled village in Kowloon. It is located near San Po Kong. On 18 July 2007, the government announced its plans to redevelop Nga Tsin Wai Tsuen.

== List of walled villages ==
Remaining walled villages in Hong Kong include:

=== North District ===
Name	Alternate name	Area and coordinates	Notes	Gate	Shrine or ancestral hall	Watch tower
Fanling Ching Wai (正圍)	Fanling Chung Wai (中圍)	Fanling 22.4975°N 114.1353°E	See "Notable walled villages" above: Fanling Wai.			
Hung Leng (孔嶺)	Kuk Fung Leng (谷豐嶺)	Fanling 22.514732°N 114.167813°E	The Hung Shing Temple of Hung Leng was probably built in 1763. It is the centre of the Four Yeuk (四約; four villages alliance), namely Loi Tung, Lung Yeuk Tau, Lin Ma Hang and Tan Chuk Hang.			
San Uk Tsai (新屋仔)	Tam Chuk Hang San Uk Tsai (丹竹坑新屋仔)	Fanling 22.510144°N 114.179228°E	San Uk Tsai was probably established before 1688.			
Tan Chuk Hang Lo Wai (丹竹坑老圍)		Fanling 22.513414°N 114.175723°E	Tan Chuk Hang Lo Wai was probably established before 1688. Together with Tan Chuk Hang San Wai, it forms Tan Chuk Hang (丹竹坑) village.			
Lo Wai (老圍)		Lung Yeuk Tau, Fanling 22.497808°N 114.151892°E	One of the "Five Wais" of Lung Yeuk Tau.			
Ma Wat Wai (麻笏圍)	鬱蔥圍	Lung Yeuk Tau, Fanling 22.499027°N 114.149998°E	One of the "Five Wais" of Lung Yeuk Tau.			
San Wai (新圍)	Kun Lung Wai (覲龍圍)	Lung Yeuk Tau, Fanling 22.507121°N 114.14842°E	One of the "Five Wais" of Lung Yeuk Tau.			
Tung Kok Wai (東閣圍)	Ling Kok Wai (嶺角圍)	Lung Yeuk Tau, Fanling 22.500589°N 114.153543°E	One of the "Five Wais" of Lung Yeuk Tau. The watchtowers in the four corners of the village have collapsed, leaving their bases.			
Wing Ning Wai (永寧圍)	六屋	Lung Yeuk Tau, Fanling 22.501585°N 114.150191°E	One of the "Five Wais" of Lung Yeuk Tau.			
Ha Wo Hang (下禾坑)		Sha Tau Kok 22.527322°N 114.198658°E				
Kuk Po Lo Wai (谷埔老圍)		Sha Tau Kok 22.528632°N 114.238294°E				
Ma Tseuk Leng San Uk Ha (麻雀嶺新屋下)		Sha Tau Kok 22.531864°N 114.203458°E				
Man Uk Pin (萬屋邊)		Sha Tau Kok 22.526382°N 114.184367°E				
Sheung Wo Hang (上禾坑)	Wo Hang (禾坑)	Sha Tau Kok 22.522956°N 114.194339°E				
Hakka Wai (客家圍)		Sheung Shui 22.503143°N 114.119060°E	A Hakka walled village located in the Tsung Pak Long area. Construction of the village started in the 1900s–1910s and was completed by 1920.			
Ho Sheung Heung Lo Wai (河上鄉老圍)	Pak Pin Wai (北邊圍)	Sheung Shui 22.51173°N 114.10859°E	There are four villages in Ho Sheung Heung, namely Nam Pin Wai, Pak Pin Wai, Chung Sum Tsuen and Chung Wai Tsuen (San Tsuen).			
Ping Kong (丙岡)	Cheung Lung Wai (祥龍圍)	Sheung Shui 22.490513°N 114.122497°E	The village has a Tin Hau Temple.			
Tai Tau Leng (大頭嶺)		Sheung Shui 22.50216°N 114.122628°E				
Wai Loi Tsuen (圍內村)	Sheung Shui Wai (上水圍)	Sheung Shui 22.509757°N 114.122589°E	Built around 1584, Wai Loi Tsuen is the original settlement of Sheung Shui Wai. It is one of the very few rural settlements having retained its original moat. It features a Tin Hau and a Hung Shing temple.			
Heung Yuen Wai (香園圍)		Ta Kwu Ling 22.55343°N 114.16455°E				
Muk Wu (木湖)		Ta Kwu Ling 22.539359°N 114.1331°E				

=== Sha Tin District ===
Name	Alternate name	Area and coordinates	Notes	Gate	Shrine or ancestral hall	Watch tower
Tsang Tai Uk (曾大屋)	Shan Ha Wai (山下圍)	Sha Tin 22.3738°N 114.1906°E	(see "Notable walled villages" above)			
Chik Chuen Wai (積存圍)	Tai Wai (大圍)	Tai Wai 22.376275°N 114.178783°E				
Tin Sam Wai (田心圍)		Tai Wai 22.369298°N 114.177826°E	Tin Sam was founded during the late Ming dynasty. Historic buildings in the village include the Choi, Leung and Liu ancestral halls, and the Entrance Gate, built during the Qing dynasty.			

=== Tai Po District ===
Name	Alternate name	Area and coordinates	Notes	Gate	Shrine or ancestral hall	Watch tower
Kei Ling Ha Lo Wai (企嶺下老圍)		Shap Sze Heung, Sai Kung Peninsula 22.411001°N 114.274177°E				
Chung Sum Wai (中心圍)	Tsing Chuen Wai (青磚圍)	Tai Hang (Tai Po) 22.469228°N 114.149808°E				
Fui Sha Wai (灰沙圍)		Tai Hang (Tai Po) 22.469915°N 114.151535°E	The walls of Fui Sha Wai were built by the local villagers during the mid-Ming dynasty. Four watchtowers were built in each corner for fortification. Nowadays, Fui Sha Wai still remains as a village exclusively for the Man clan.			
Pan Chung (泮涌)		Tai Po 22.445308°N 114.165748°E	A multi-clan village. #1403			
Tai Po Tau Shui Wai (大埔頭水圍)	Tai Po Tau Lo Wai (大埔頭老圍)	Tai Wo 22.452524°N 114.157438°E	Tai Po Tau Shui Wai was established during the Song dynasty by a branch of the Tang Clan of Kam Tin. The enclosing walls were constructed during the Ming dynasty.			

=== Tsuen Wan District ===
Name	Alternate name	Area and coordinates	Notes	Gate	Shrine or ancestral hall	Watch tower
Sam Tung Uk (三棟屋)	Chan Sei Bit Tong (陳四必堂)	Tsuen Wan 22.371934°N 114.120223°E	Established by the Chan (陳) clan in 1786, the former Hakka walled village has been converted into the Sam Tung Uk Museum, and is now a declared monument.			

=== Tuen Mun District ===
Name	Alternate name	Area and coordinates	Notes	Gate	Shrine or ancestral hall	Watch tower
Chung Uk Tsuen (鍾屋村)	Kwong Tin Wai (廣田圍)	Lam Tei 22.428791°N 113.992418°E	The Chungs of Chung Uk Tsuen moved from Dongguan during the Ming dynasty.			
Lam Tei Tsuen (藍地村)	Wing On Tsuen (永安村)	Lam Tei 22.419186°N 113.984023°E	Established by the To (陶) Clan			
Nai Wai (泥圍)	Wong Kong Wai (黃崗圍)	Lam Tei 22.423307°N 113.988609°E	Established by the To (陶) Clan #1229 #1252			
Sun Fung Wai (順風圍)	(順豐圍)	Lam Tei 22.424334°N 113.988679°E	A multi-lineage village established around 300 years ago. #875 #1262			
Tsing Chuen Wai (青磚圍)	Mak Yuen Wai (麥園圍)	Lam Tei 22.422667°N 113.981861°E	Established by the To (陶) Clan about 300 years ago. Tin Hau, Kwan Tai and a Qing official are worshipped in the village shrine.			
Tuen Mun San Tsuen (屯門新村)	San Tsuen Wai (新村圍); Tai Yuen Wai (大園圍)	Lam Tei 22.418229°N 113.984436°E	Established by the To (陶) Clan			
Tuen Tsz Wai (屯子圍)	Tin Tsz Wai (田子圍)	Lam Tei 22.42174°N 113.98127°E	The village was built by the Siu (蕭) Clan. It was later settled by the To (陶) Clan during the Qing dynasty. The entrance gate was demolished and was rebuilt further east for feng shui reasons.			

=== Wong Tai Sin District ===
Name	Alternate name	Area and coordinates	Notes	Gate	Shrine	Watch tower
Nga Tsin Wai Tsuen (衙前圍村)	Hing Yau Yu Tsuen (慶有餘村) (餘慶圍)	Wong Tai Sin 22.335042°N 114.193354°E	See also "Notable walled villages" above.			

=== Yuen Long District ===
Name	Alternate name	Area and coordinates	Notes	Gate	Shrine or ancestral hall	Watch tower
San Wai (新圍)	San Hing Wai (新慶圍)	Ha Tsuen 22.451724°N 113.990628°E				
Sik Kong Wai (錫降圍)		Ha Tsuen 22.449158°N 113.991985°E				
Tseung Kong Wai (祥降圍)	Sai Tau Lei (西頭里); Lo Wai (老圍)	Ha Tsuen 22.450331°N 113.987727°E				
Tin Sam Tsuen (田心村)	Tin Sam Wai (田心圍)	Hung Shui Kiu 22.435152°N 113.991898°E				
Kat Hing Wai (吉慶圍)	Fui Sha Wai (灰沙圍)	Kam Tin 22.43971°N 114.064011°E	(see "Notable walled villages" above) pp.56–58			
Tai Hong Wai (泰康圍)		Kam Tin 22.440821°N 114.065154°E	pp.56–58			
Wing Lung Wai (永隆圍)	Sha Lan Mei (沙欄尾) or Wing Lung Wai (永龍圍); Present name since 1905.	Kam Tin 22.440042°N 114.067235°E	The village was founded in the Chenghua reign (1465–1487). The enclosing wall was built in the Kangxi reign (1661–1722). The moat was reclaimed in the 1960s.			
Kam Hing Wai (錦慶圍)		Kam Tin 22.443324°N 114.061466°E				
Sha Po Tsuen (沙埔村)		Kam Tin 22.453374°N 114.054795°E				
Mong Tseng Wai (輞井圍)		Lau Fau Shan 22.477555°N 114.003347°E				
Sha Kong Wai (沙江圍)	Nam She (蚺蛇)	Lau Fau Shan 22.463893°N 113.990761°E				
Hop Shan Wai (合山圍)		Pat Heung 22.428009°N 114.086948°E	The walled village forms the core of Lin Fa Tei (蓮花地) Village.			
Kiu Tau Wai (橋頭圍)		Ping Shan 22.443011°N 114.004257°E	One of the "Three Wais" of this part of Ping Shan.			
Fui Sha Wai (灰沙圍)		Ping Shan 22.438439°N 114.006388°E	One of the "Three Wais" of this part of Ping Shan.			
Sheung Cheung Wai (上璋圍)	Sheung Cheung Wai (上章圍)	Ping Shan 22.446739°N 114.006539°E	One of the "Three Wais" of this part of Ping Shan. Built about 200 years ago by a line of the Tang Clan from nearby Hang Tau Tsuen. The lower storey of the southwest watchtower remains.			
Shek Po Tsuen (石埔村)	Shek Po Wai (石步圍)	Ping Shan 22.440731°N 113.996217°E				
Lam Hau Tsuen (欖口村)		Ping Shan 22.434992°N 114.018248°E				
Shan Ha Tsuen (山下村)	山廈村	Ping Shan 22.432301°N 114.016279°E				
Yan Shau Wai (仁壽圍)		San Tin 22.501667°N 114.074958°E				
Shek Wu Wai (石湖圍)		San Tin 22.491963°N 114.072452°E				
Pok Wai (壆圍)		San Tin 22.465567°N 114.052331°E				
Ma Tin Tsuen (馬田村)		Shap Pat Heung 22.439415°N 114.023600°E				
Tin Liu Tsuen (田寮村)		Shap Pat Heung 22.432659°N 114.024738°E	The main shrine of the village is dedicated to Tai Wong, who is considered to be the protective deity of the village. Rebuilt in 1935, it lies on the central axis of the village together with the Entrance Gate.			
Muk Kiu Tau Tsuen (木橋頭村)		Shap Pat Heung 22.429304°N 114.024706°E				
Shui Tsiu San Tsuen (水蕉新村)		Shap Pat Heung 22.425522°N 114.028128°E	Front gate was destroyed and rebuilt in 2017 by village residents. Some ruins from original buildings still remain.			
Pak Sha Tsuen (白沙村)		Shap Pat Heung 22.421452°N 114.021485°E				
Shui Pin Wai (水邊圍)	鴨乸圍	Wang Chau 22.444826°N 114.01853°E				
Chung Sam Wai (中心圍)		Wang Chau 22.453761°N 114.026896°E				
Tai Tseng Wai (大井圍)		Wang Chau 22.462993°N 114.020643°E				
Nam Pin Wai (南邊圍)		Yuen Long Kau Hui 22.447448°N 114.033032°E				
Sai Pin Wai (西邊圍)		Yuen Long Kau Hui 22.448132°N 114.03221°E				
Tai Wai Tsuen (大圍村)		Yuen Long Kau Hui 22.447055°N 114.037670°E	The village was founded by the Wong clan and the Choi clan around the early 16th century.			
Ying Lung Wai (英龍圍)		Yuen Long Kau Hui 22.447188°N 114.036905°E	The village was established by a branch of the Kam Tin Tangs, who were originally in Nam Pin Wai but moved to the area to establish the village due to feng shui reasons.			
Tai Kiu (大橋)		West of Yuen Long Kau Hui 22.446695°N 114.026855°E				

== Unconfirmed ==
The following villages are likely to have been walled villages, although it is not confirmed:

Name	Alternate name	Area and coordinates	Notes	Gate	Shrine or ancestral hall	Watch tower
Sai Tau Wai (西頭圍)		Wang Chau, Yuen Long District 22.452931°N 114.025916°E				
Tsz Tin Wai (子田圍)		Lam Tei, Tuen Mun District 22.416147°N 113.974632°E	The village has been engulfed by Tsz Tin Tsuen (紫田村)			

== Other fenced villages ==
A number of old villages in Hong Kong have a wall, built for defensive or feng shui purposes, and an entrance gate, but are not considered as traditional walled villages. They include:

Name	Alternate name	Area and coordinates	Notes	Gate	Shrine or ancestral hall	Watch tower
Pak Mong (白芒)		Lantau Island, Islands District 22.29537°N 113.97129°E	The entrance gate (18th century), an enclosing wall extending to the east and north of the village and the watch tower (1940s), were built to protect the village against pirates and bandits.			
Sha Lo Wan Tsuen (沙螺灣村)		Lantau Island, Islands District 22.285178°N 113.902587°E	A linear wall was built at the mouth of the village to protect it from attacks by pirates and bandits. It was later demolished, leaving the entrance gate only.			
Siu Hang Tsuen (小坑村)		Lung Yeuk Tau, Fanling, North District 22.50951°N 114.14721°E	The wall in front of the village was built, together with the archway at the eastern entrance, for feng shui purposes around 1960.			
Wing Ning Tsuen (永寧村)	Tai Tang (大廳)	Lung Yeuk Tau, Fanling, North District 22.50103°N 114.1508°E				
Chow Tin Tsuen (週田村)		Ta Kwu Ling, North District 22.535984°N 114.145249°E				
Lai Chi Wo (荔枝窩)		Sha Tau Kok, North District 22.526811°N 114.259333°E	Hakka village.			
Sheung Yiu Village (上窰村)		Pak Tam Chung, Sai Kung District 22.392464°N 114.321689°E	Hakka village. Built in the late 19th century. It has been converted into a museum.			
Pak Sha O (白沙澳)		Sai Kung North, Tai Po District 22.4489°N 114.31955°E				
Pak Sha O Ha Yeung (白沙澳下洋)		Sai Kung North, Tai Po District 22.453599°N 114.324640°E				
Ng Tung Chai (梧桐寨)	Wong Fung Chai (黃峰寨)	Lam Tsuen, Tai Po District; 22.437389°N 114.127917°E	The village features 3 ancestral halls.			
Tung Tau Tsuen (東頭村)	Tung Tau Lei (東頭里)	Ha Tsuen, Yuen Long District 22.452966°N 113.99272°E				
San Uk Tsuen (新屋村)		Ha Tsuen, Yuen Long District 22.445373°N 113.991962°E				
Wang Toi Shan Wing Ning Lei (橫台山永寧里)		Pat Heung, Yuen Long District 22.442013°N 114.095724°E				
Wing Ping Tsuen (永平村)		San Tin, Yuen Long District 22.50061°N 114.076515°E				
Sheung Yau Tin Tsuen (上攸田)		Shap Pat Heung, Yuen Long District 22.438521°N 114.03556°E				
Yeung Ka Tsuen (楊家村)		Shap Pat Heung, Yuen Long District 22.411001°N 114.020630°E				
Ng Uk Tsuen (吳屋村)	Tai Tseng Ng Uk Tsuen (大井吳屋村)	Wang Chau, Yuen Long District 22.464680°N 114.021255°E	The entrance gate of the village was built in 1862 for defense purposes. The village features a Tin Hau Temple.			

== Non-walled 'wai' ==
The following villages are neither current nor former walled villages, despite the wai in their name:

- Fan Ling Nam Wai (粉嶺南圍)
- Fan Ling Pak Wai (粉嶺北圍)
- Fung Ka Wai (馮家圍)
- Ha Wai (下圍)
- Hok Tau Wai (鶴數圍)
- Kam Tsin Wai (金錢圍)
- Kan Tau Wai (簡頭圍)
- Kat O Sheung Wai (吉澳上圍)
- Kau Lung Hang Kau Wai (九龍坑舊圍)
- Kau Lung Hang San Wai (九龍坑新圍)
- Kau Shi Wai (狗屎圍), renamed Fung Mei Wai (鳯美圍)
- Kei Ling Ha San Wai (企嶺下新圍)
- Kei Lun Wai (麒麟圍)
- Lo Wai (Tsuen Wan) (老圍(荃灣))
- Luk Keng Ha Wai (鹿頸下圍)
- Luk Keng Sheung Wai (鹿頸上圍)
- Mai Po Lo Wai (米埔老圍)
- Nam Pin Wai (Sai Kung) (南邊圍(西貢))
- Nam Wai (南圍)
- Pak Wai (Kam Tin) (北圍(錦田))
- Pak Wai (Sai Kung) (北圍(西貢))
- Pui O Lo Wai (貝澳老圍)
- San Lung Wai (新隆圍)
- San Tin Ha San Wai (新田下新圍)
- San Tin Sheung San Wai (新田上新圍)
- Sha Lo Tung Lo Wai (沙螺洞老圍)
- Sha Tin Wai (沙田圍)
- Shek Pok Wai (石壆圍)
- Shek Tau Wai (石頭圍)
- Sheung Kwai Chung Wai (上癸涌圍)
- Shui Tsiu Lo Wai (水蕉老圍)
- So Kwun Wat Lo Wai (掃管笏老圍)
- Tai Po Kau Lo Wai (大埔滘老圍)
- Tai Po Kau San Wai (大埔滘新圍)
- Tai Shang Wai (大生圍)
- Tap Mun Chung Wai (塔門中圍)
- Tap Mun Ha Wai (塔門下圍)
- Tap Mun Sheung Wai (塔門上圍)
- To Yuen Wai (桃園圍)
- Tseng Tau Wai (井頭圍)
- Tsing Chuen Wai (Yuen Long) (靑磚圍(元朗))
- Tsiu Keng Lo Wai (蕉徑老圍)
- Tsiu Keng San Wai (蕉徑新圍)
- Tung Chan Wai (東鎭圍)
- Tung Tau Wai (東頭圍)
- Wong Chuk Hang San Wai (黃竹坑新圍)
- Wong Ka Wai (黃家圍)
- Wu Kau Tang Lo Wai (烏蛟滕老圍)

== See also ==
- Housing in Hong Kong
- History of Hong Kong
- List of villages in Hong Kong
- Chinese clan
- Weitou dialect
- Dapengcheng, a walled village in Shenzhen
- Hakka walled village
- Kowloon Walled City
