= San Uk Tsai =

San Uk Tsai (Chinese: 新屋仔) may refer to:

- San Uk Tsai (North District), a village in North District, Hong Kong
- San Uk Tsai (Tai Po District), a village in Tai Po District, Hong Kong
