= Ma Tin Tsuen =

Walled village in Shap Pat Heung, Yuen Long District, Hong Kong

Coordinates: 22.439415°N 114.023600°E

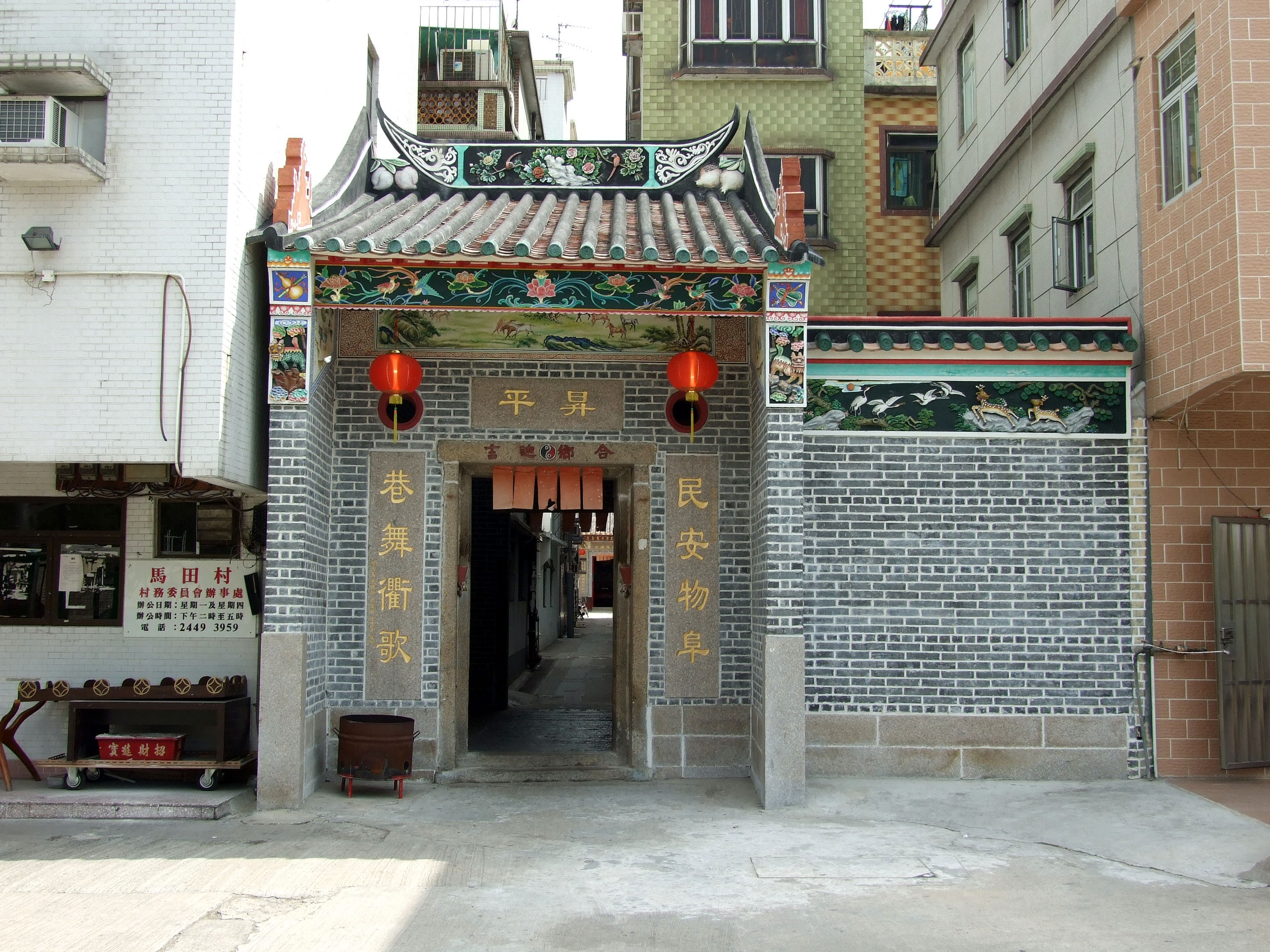
Entrance gate of Ma Tin Tsuen

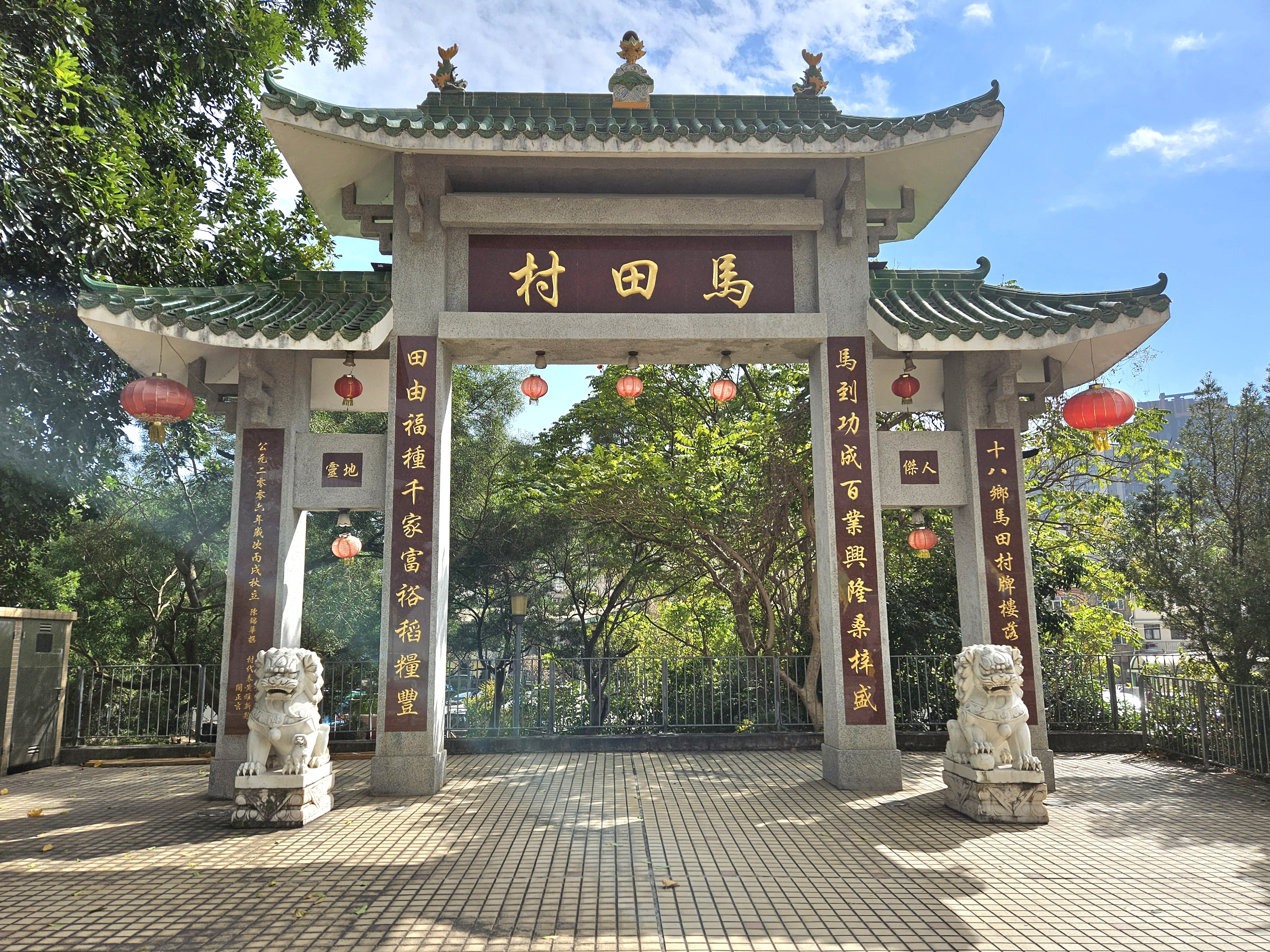
Paifang of Ma Tin Tsuen

Ma Tin Tsuen (Chinese: 馬田村) is a walled village in Shap Pat Heung, Yuen Long District, Hong Kong.

== Administration ==
Ma Tin Tsuen is a recognized village under the New Territories Small House Policy. It is one of the villages represented within the Shap Pat Heung Rural Committee. For electoral purposes, Ma Tin Tsuen is part of the Shap Pat Heung Central constituency, which was formerly represented by Willis Fong Ho-hin until July 2021.

== Features ==
The entrance gate and the shrine of the walled villages were rebuilt in 2009.

== Education ==
Ma Tin Tsuen is in Primary One Admission (POA) School Net 73. Within the school net are multiple aided schools (operated independently but funded with government money) and one government school: South Yuen Long Government Primary School (南元朗官立小學).

== See also ==
- Walled villages of Hong Kong
