= Muk Kiu Tau Tsuen =

Walled village in Hong Kong

Coordinates: 22.429304°N 114.024706°E

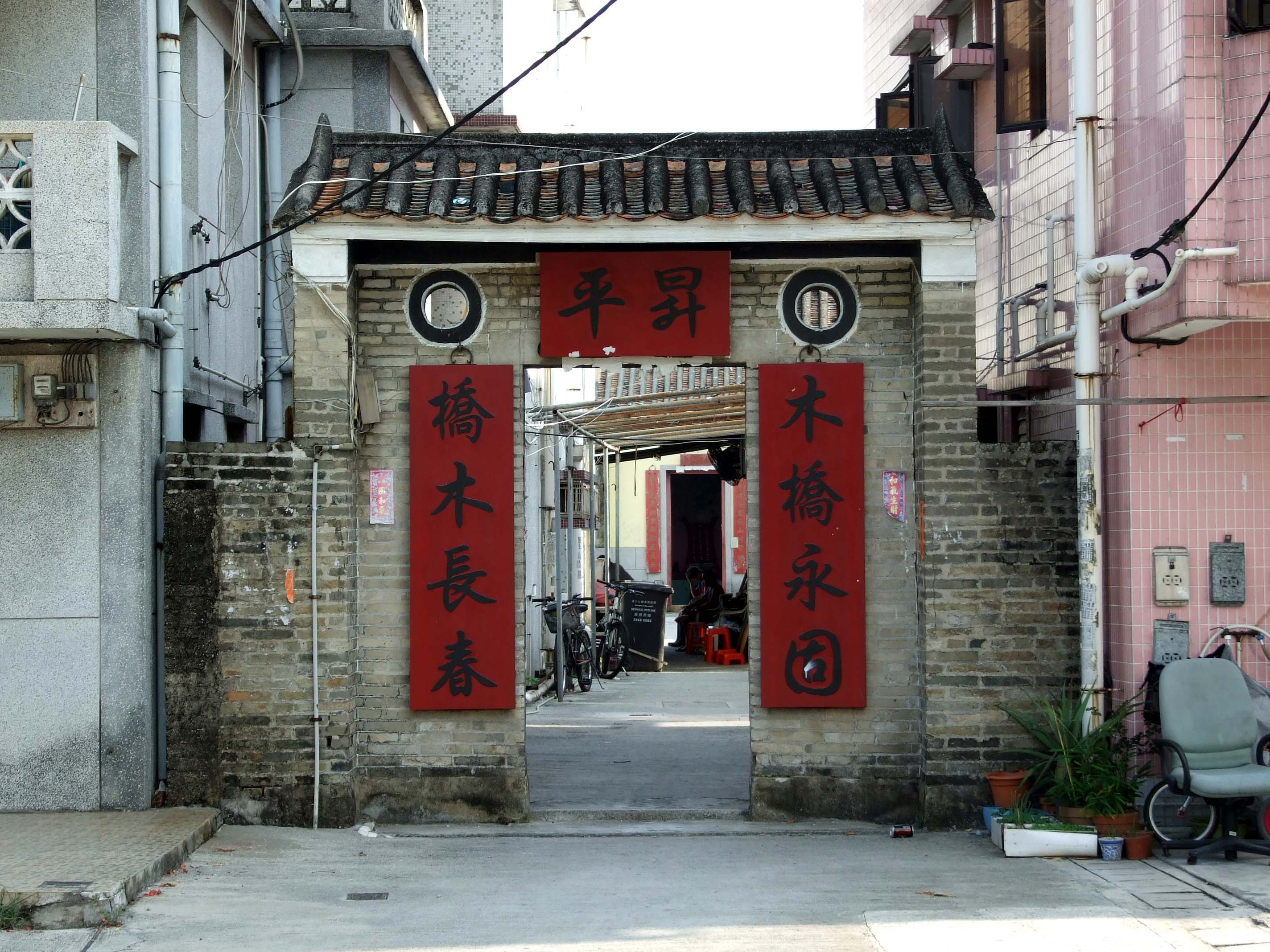
Entrance gate of Muk Kiu Tau Tsuen.

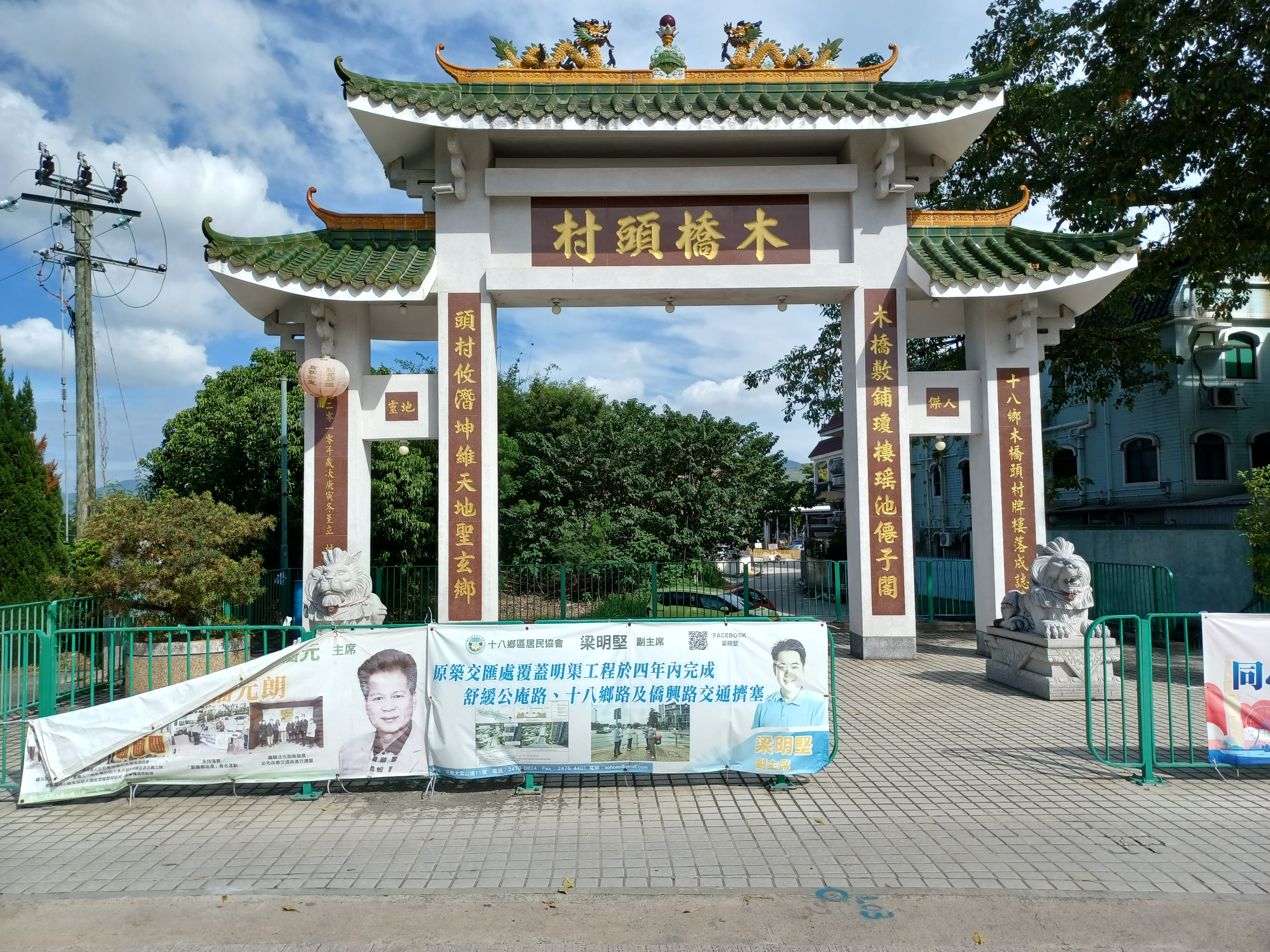
Paifang of Muk Kiu Tau Tsuen.

Muk Kiu Tau Tsuen (Chinese: 木橋頭村) is a walled village in Shap Pat Heung, Yuen Long District, in the New Territories of Hong Kong.

== Recognised status ==
Muk Kiu Tau Tsuen is a recognised village under the New Territories Small House Policy.

== Education ==
Muk Kiu Kau Tsuen is in Primary One Admission (POA) School Net 73. Within the school net are multiple aided schools (operated independently but funded with government money) and one government school: South Yuen Long Government Primary School (南元朗官立小學).

== See also ==
- Walled villages of Hong Kong
