= Sha Po Tsuen =

Village in Hong Kong

Coordinates: 22.453374°N 114.054795°E

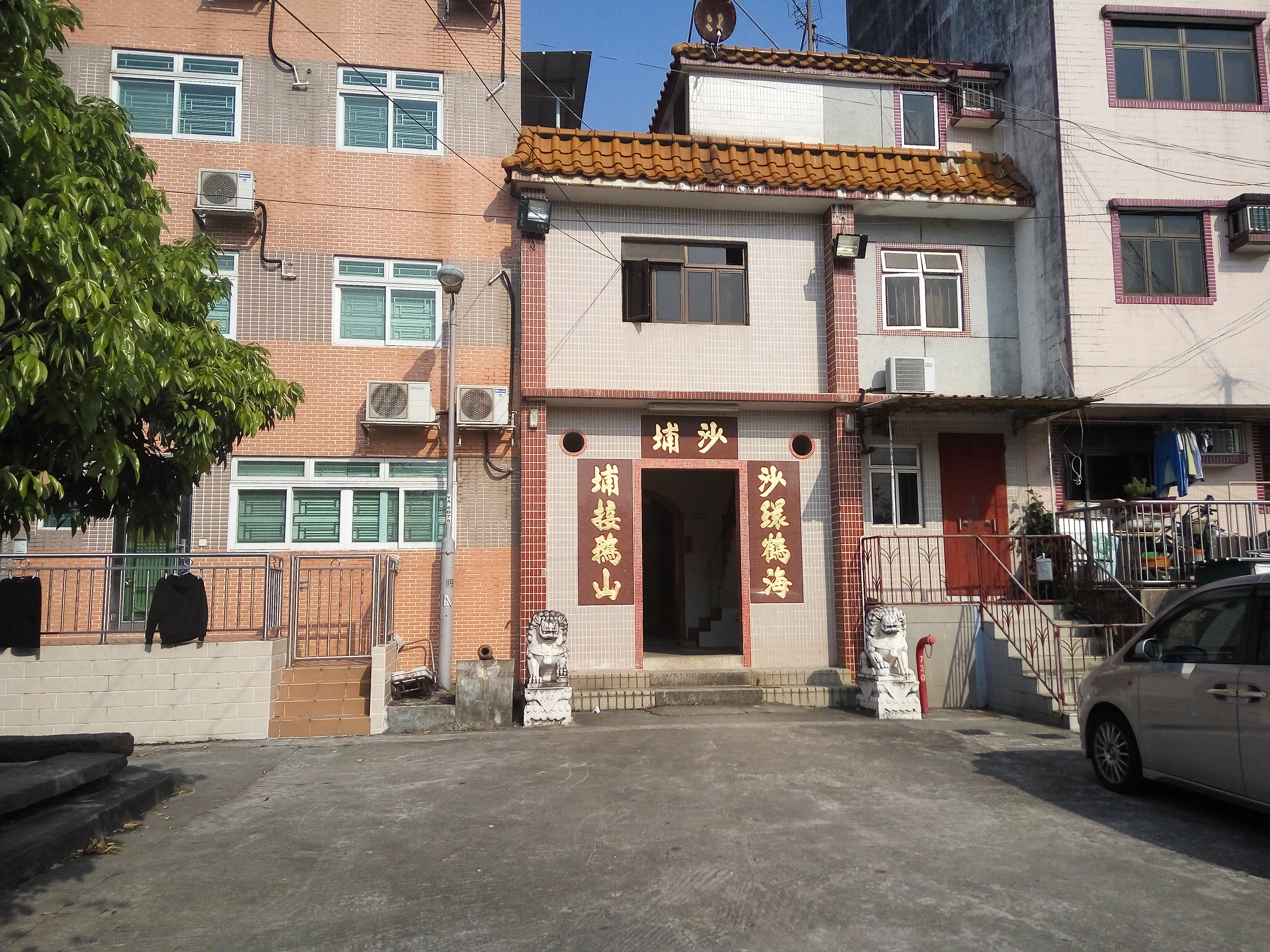
Entrance gate of Sha Po Tsuen.

Sha Po Tsuen (Chinese: 沙埔村) is a walled village in Kam Tin, Yuen Long District, Hong Kong.

== Administration ==
Sha Po Tsuen is a recognized village under the New Territories Small House Policy.

== Education ==
Sha Po is in Primary One Admission (POA) School Net 74. Within the school net are multiple aided schools (operated independently but funded with government money) and one government school: Yuen Long Government Primary School (元朗官立小學).

== See also ==
- Walled villages of Hong Kong
