= Shek Po Tsuen =

Walled village in Hung Shui Kiu, Yuen Long District, Hong Kong

Coordinates: 22.440731°N 113.996217°E

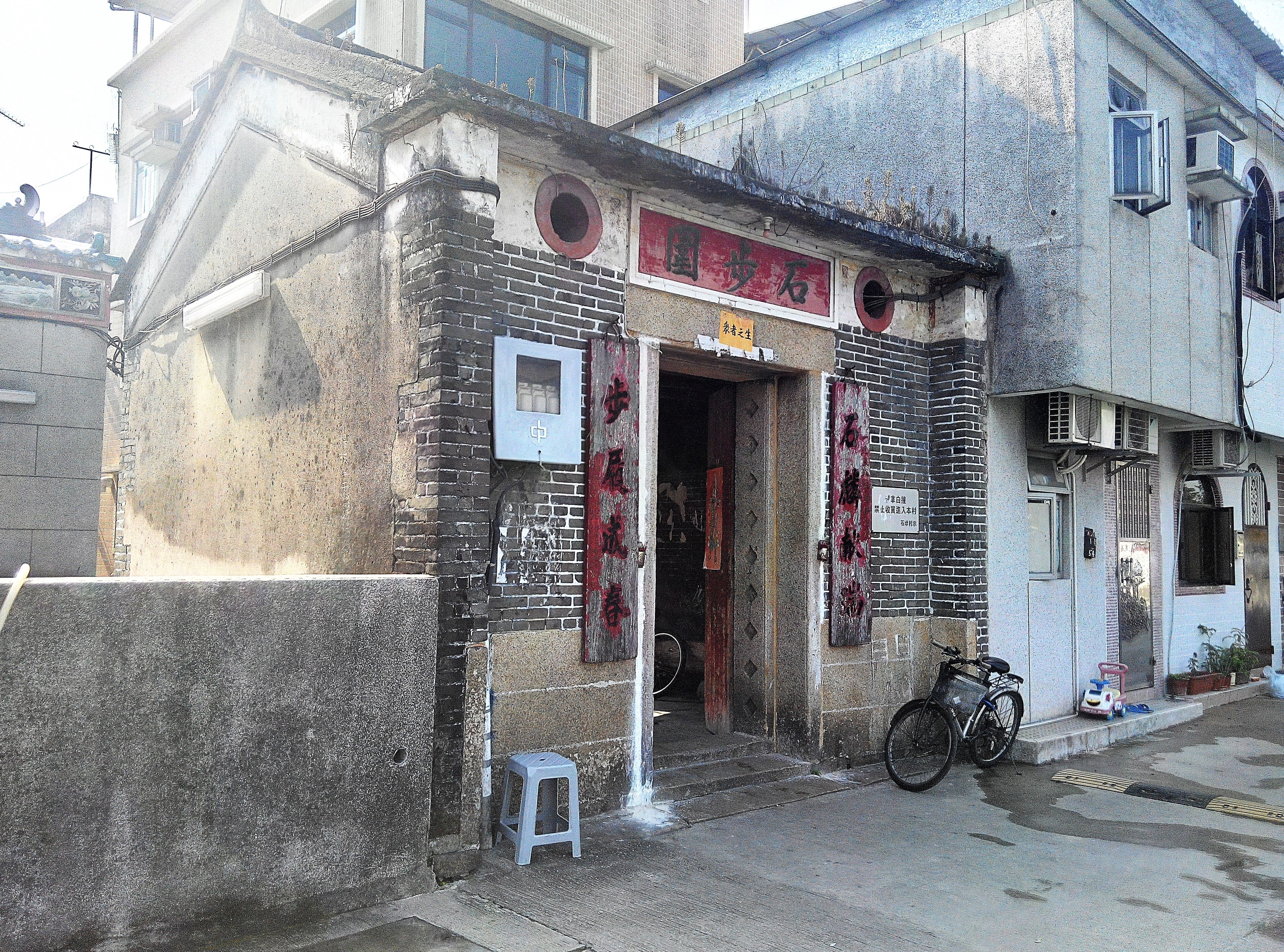
Entrance gate of Shek Po Tsuen. The name of Shek Po Wai (石步圍) is on the gate.

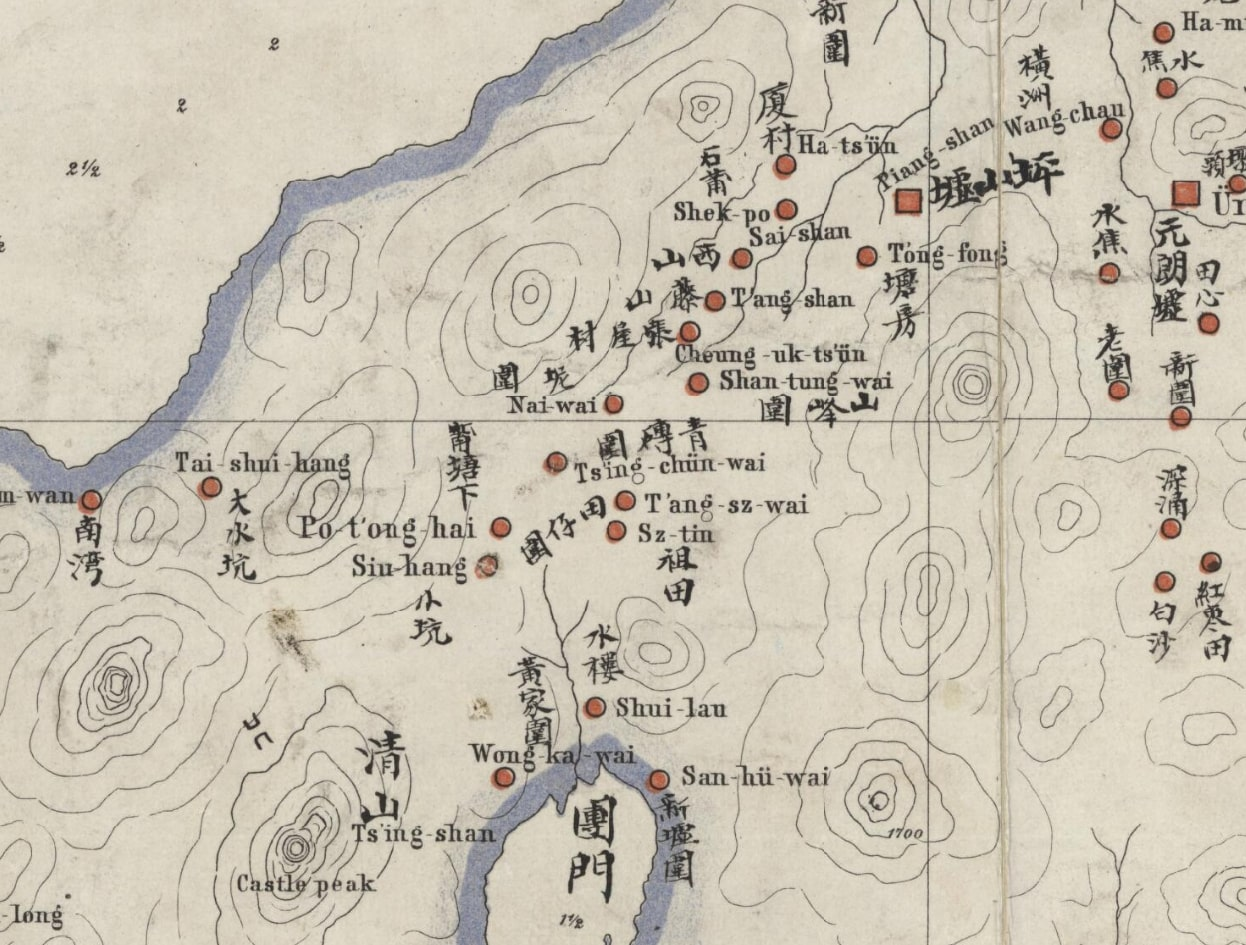
Shek Po Tsuen on the "Map of the San-On District" by Simeone Volonteri (1866).

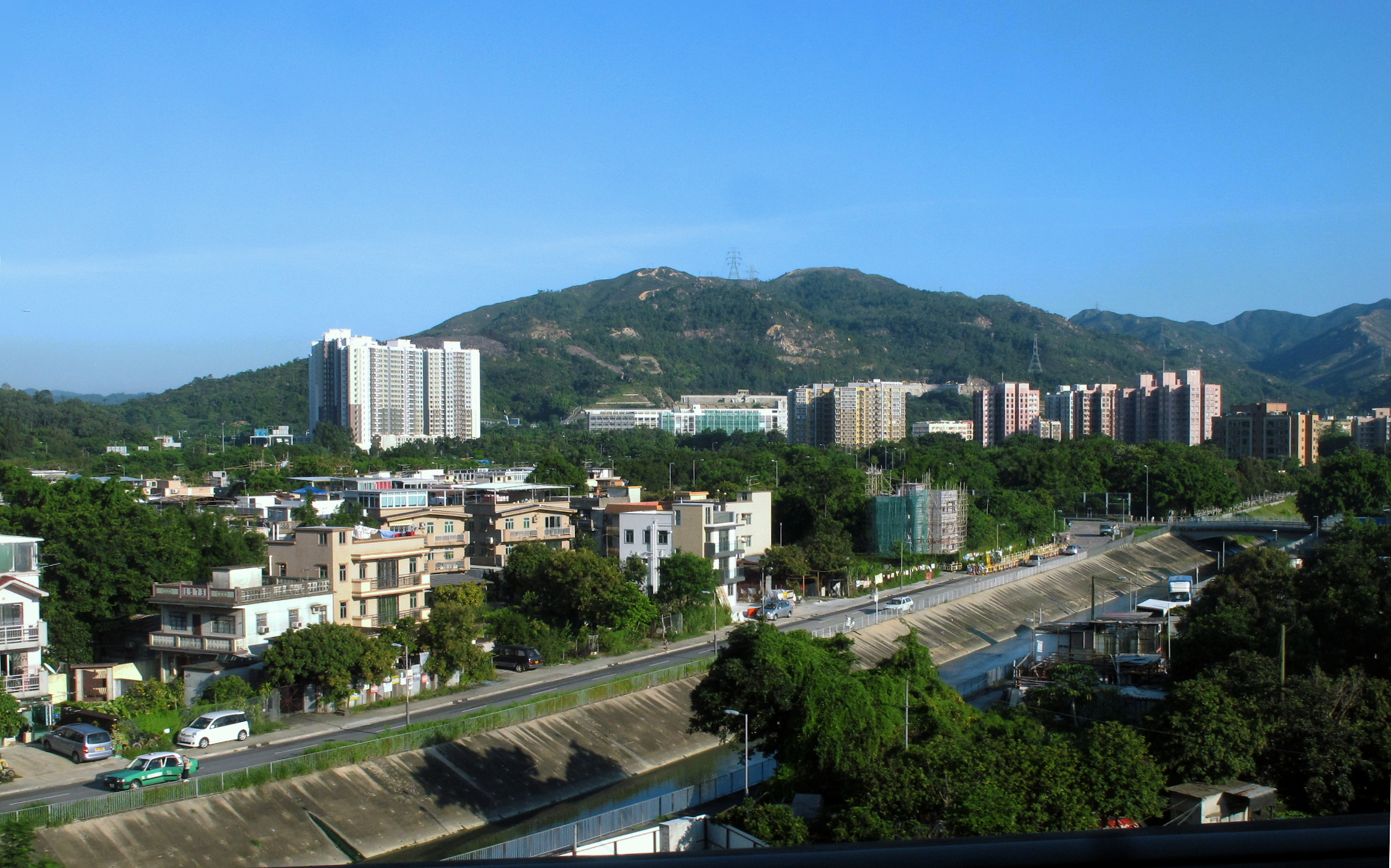
View of Hung Shui Kiu with Shek Po Tsuen in the foreground (left).

Shek Po Tsuen (Chinese: 石埗村) is a walled village in Hung Shui Kiu, Yuen Long District, Hong Kong.

== Administration ==
Shek Po Tsuen is a recognized village under the New Territories Small House Policy. It is one of the 37 villages represented within the Ping Shan Rural Committee. For electoral purposes, Shek Po Tsuen is part of the Ping Shan Central constituency.

== History ==
Shek Po Tsuen was established in 1531, during the Ming dynasty.

Shek Po Tsuen appears on the "Map of the San-On District", published in 1866 by Simeone Volonteri.

At the time of the 1911 census, the population of Shek Po was 257. The number of males was 108.

== Features ==
The entrance gate of Shek Po Wai (石埔村) in Shek Po Tsuen is a Grade III historic building.

== See also ==
- Walled villages of Hong Kong
