= Tai Tau Leng =

Coordinates: 22.50216°N 114.122628°E

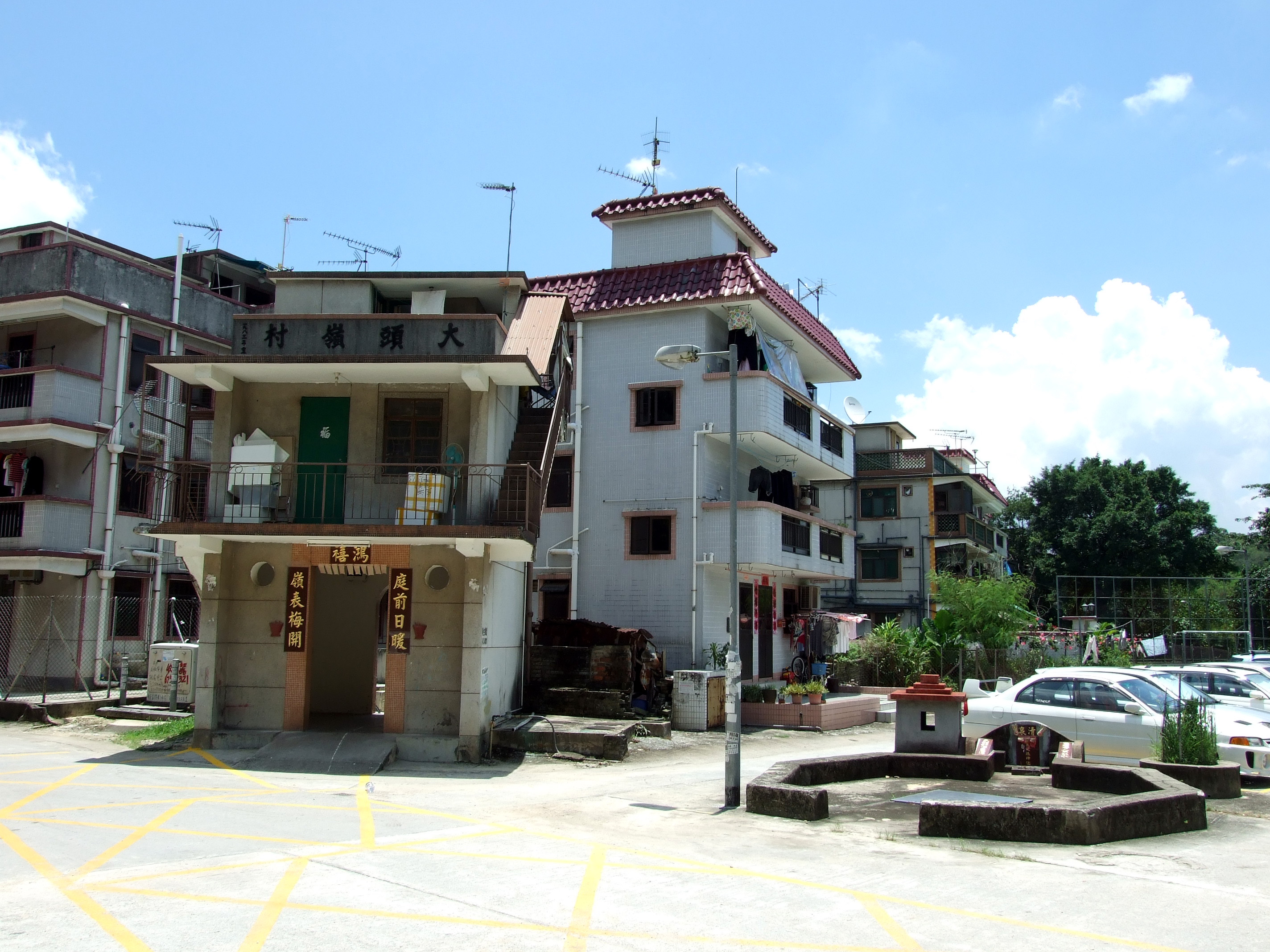
Former entrance gate of Tai Tau Leng and old well.

Tai Tau Leng (Chinese: 大頭嶺) is a Punti walled village in Sheung Shui, North District, Hong Kong.

== Administration ==
Tai Tau Leng is a recognized village under the New Territories Small House Policy.

== See also ==
- Walled villages of Hong Kong
