= Pok Wai =

Hong Kong village

Coordinates: 22.465567°N 114.052331°E

Pok Wai (Chinese: 壆圍) is a walled village in the San Tin area of Yuen Long District, Hong Kong.

== Administration ==
Pok Wai is a recognized village under the New Territories Small House Policy.

== History ==
The village was erected by Man Sau-fuk (文壽福) around a century ago.

At the time of the 1911 census, the population of Pok Wai was 225. The number of males was 100.

== Features ==
The village features a central axis and seven rows of village houses. The entrance gate and the enclosing walls have been demolished. A shrine is located at the back row of the village houses, facing the entry vertical lane of the village. Its altar houses 13 deities for worship, including Kwun Yam, Tin Hau, Man Cheong and Yeung Hau.

A post World War II pillboxes and trenches system is located in the vicinity of Pok Wai. They are believed to have been built as part of the British defense of Kai Kung Leng, and protecting Shek Kong Airfield.

== See also ==
- Walled villages of Hong Kong
