= Yan Shau Wai =

Village in Hong Kong

Coordinates: 22.501667°N 114.074958°E

Yan Shau Wai (Chinese: 仁壽圍), sometimes transliterated as Yan Sau Wai, is a walled village in the San Tin area of Yuen Long District, Hong Kong.

== Administration ==
Yan Sau Wai is a recognized village under the New Territories Small House Policy.

== See also ==
- Walled villages of Hong Kong
