= Pak Sha Tsuen =

Walled village in Shap Pat Heung, Yuen Long District, Hong Kong

Coordinates: 22.421452°N 114.021485°E

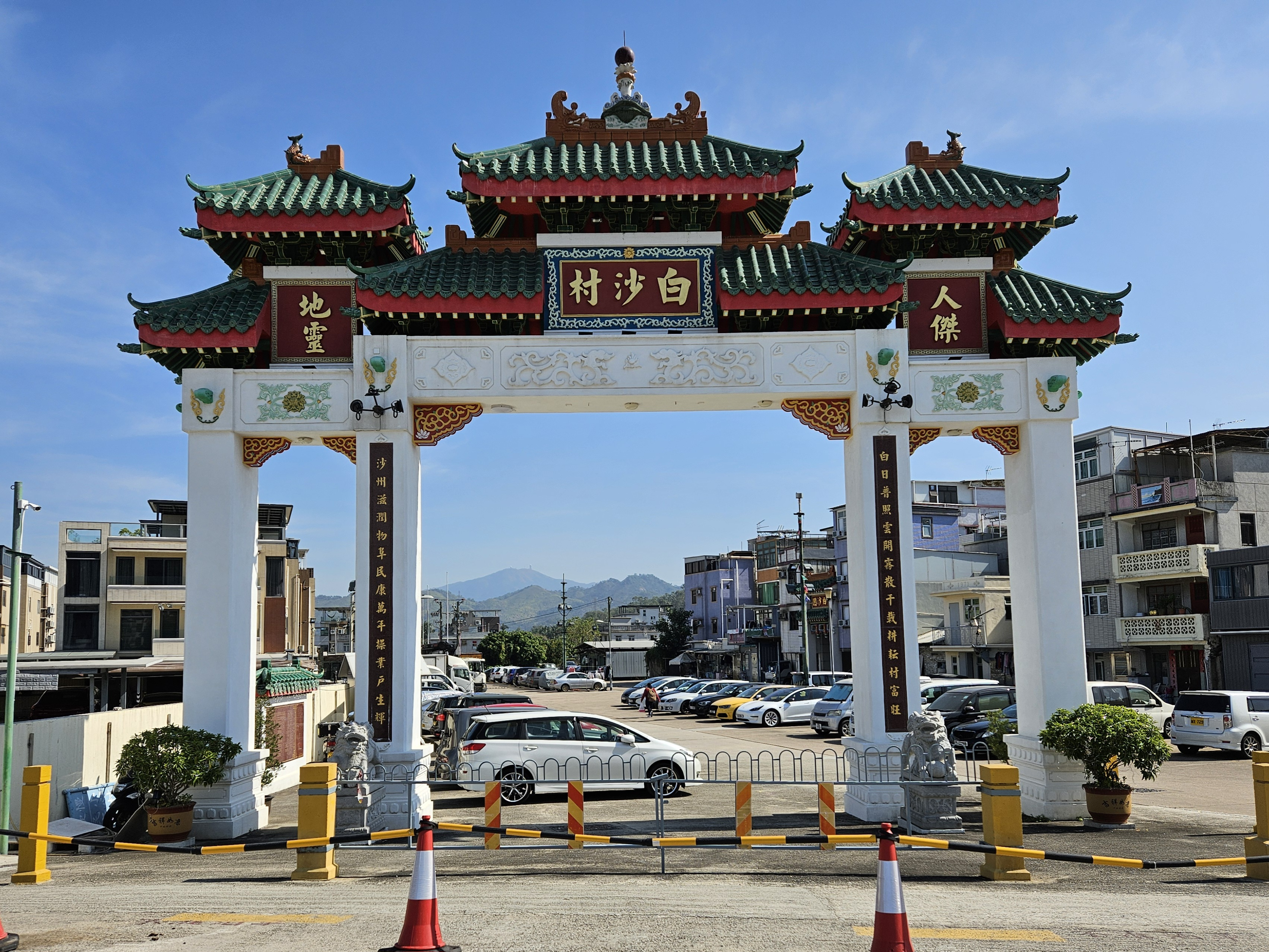
Paifang of Pak Sha Tsuen.

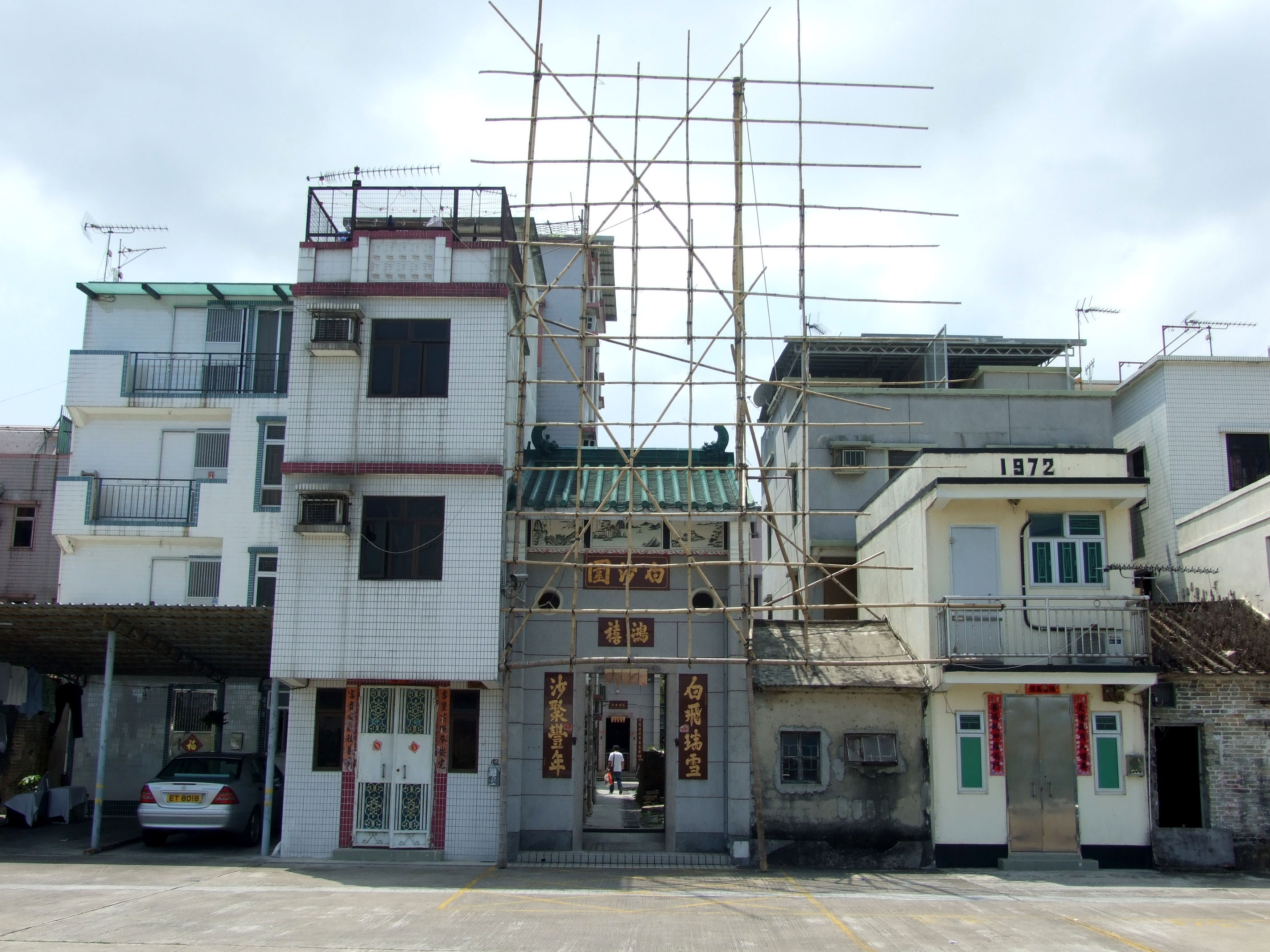
Entrance gate of Pak Sha Tsuen.

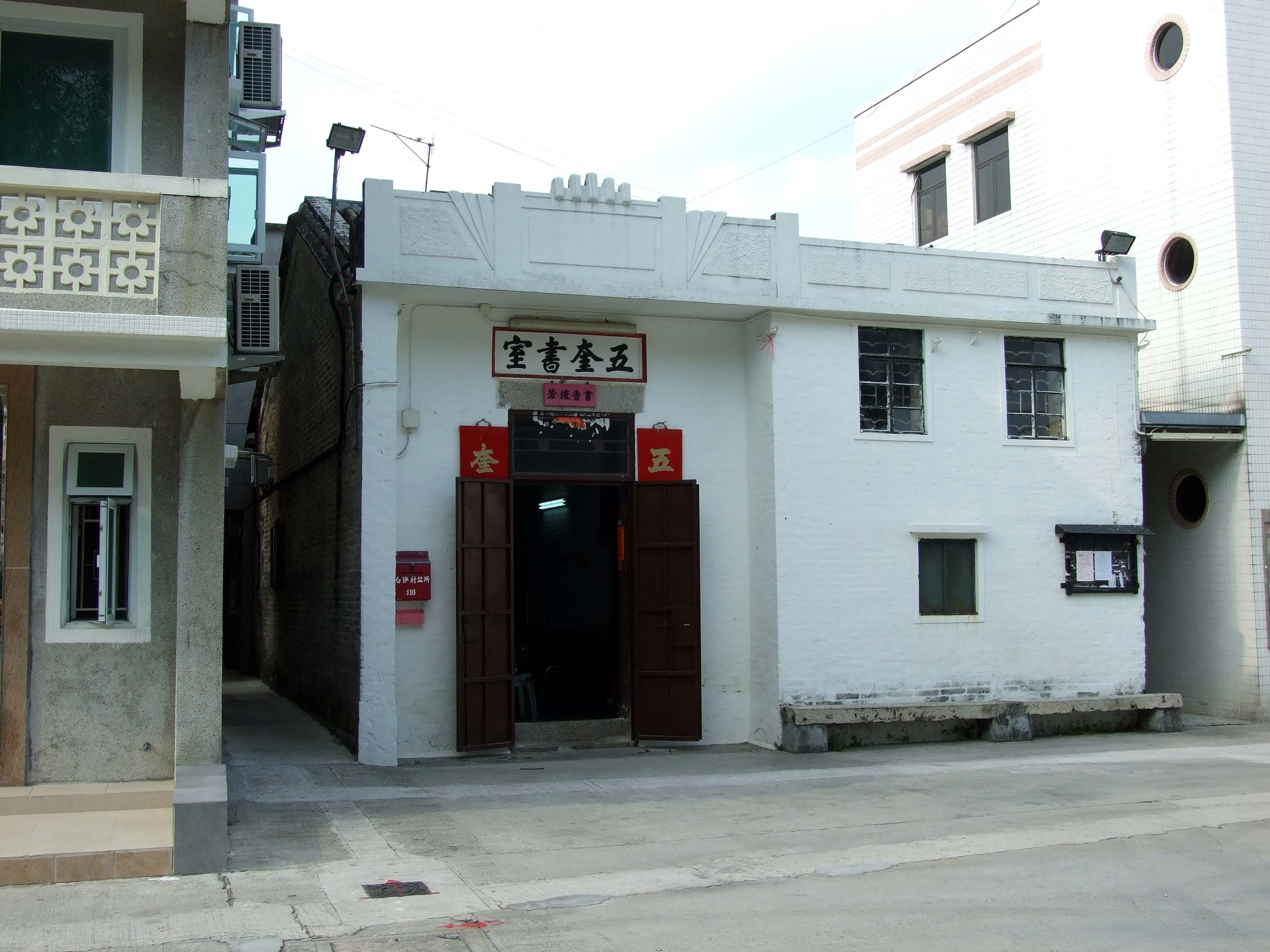
Ng Fui Study Hall in Pak Sha Tsuen.

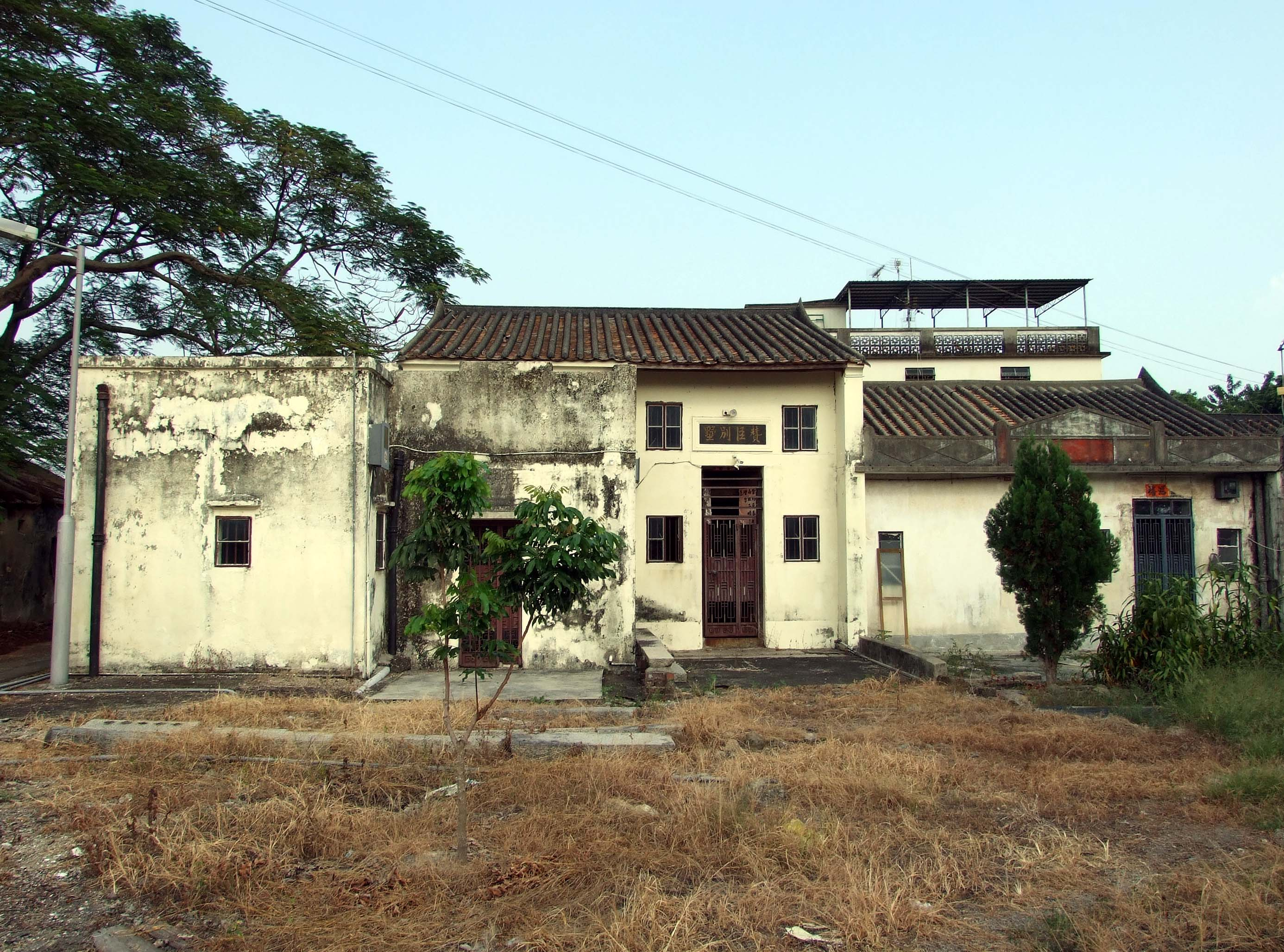
Villa of Tsan San in Pak Sha Tsuen.

Pak Sha Tsuen (Chinese: 白沙村) is a walled village in Shap Pat Heung, Yuen Long District, Hong Kong.

== Administration ==
Pak Sha Tsuen is a recognized village under the New Territories Small House Policy.

== History ==
In May 2021, 100 kg of cocaine was seized inside of the village.

== Features ==
The Ng Fui Study Hall and the Villa of Tsan San in Pak Sha Tsuen are listed as Grade III historic buildings.

== Education ==
Pak Sha Tsuen is in Primary One Admission (POA) School Net 73. Within the school net are multiple aided schools (operated independently but funded with government money) and one government school: South Yuen Long Government Primary School (南元朗官立小學).

== See also ==
- Walled villages of Hong Kong
