= San Uk Tsai (North District) =

Coordinates: 22.510144°N 114.179228°E

- Traditional Chinese: 新屋仔
- Cantonese Yale: sān ūk jái
Transcriptions
Yue: Cantonese
- Yale Romanization: sān ūk jái
- Jyutping: san1 nguk1 zai2

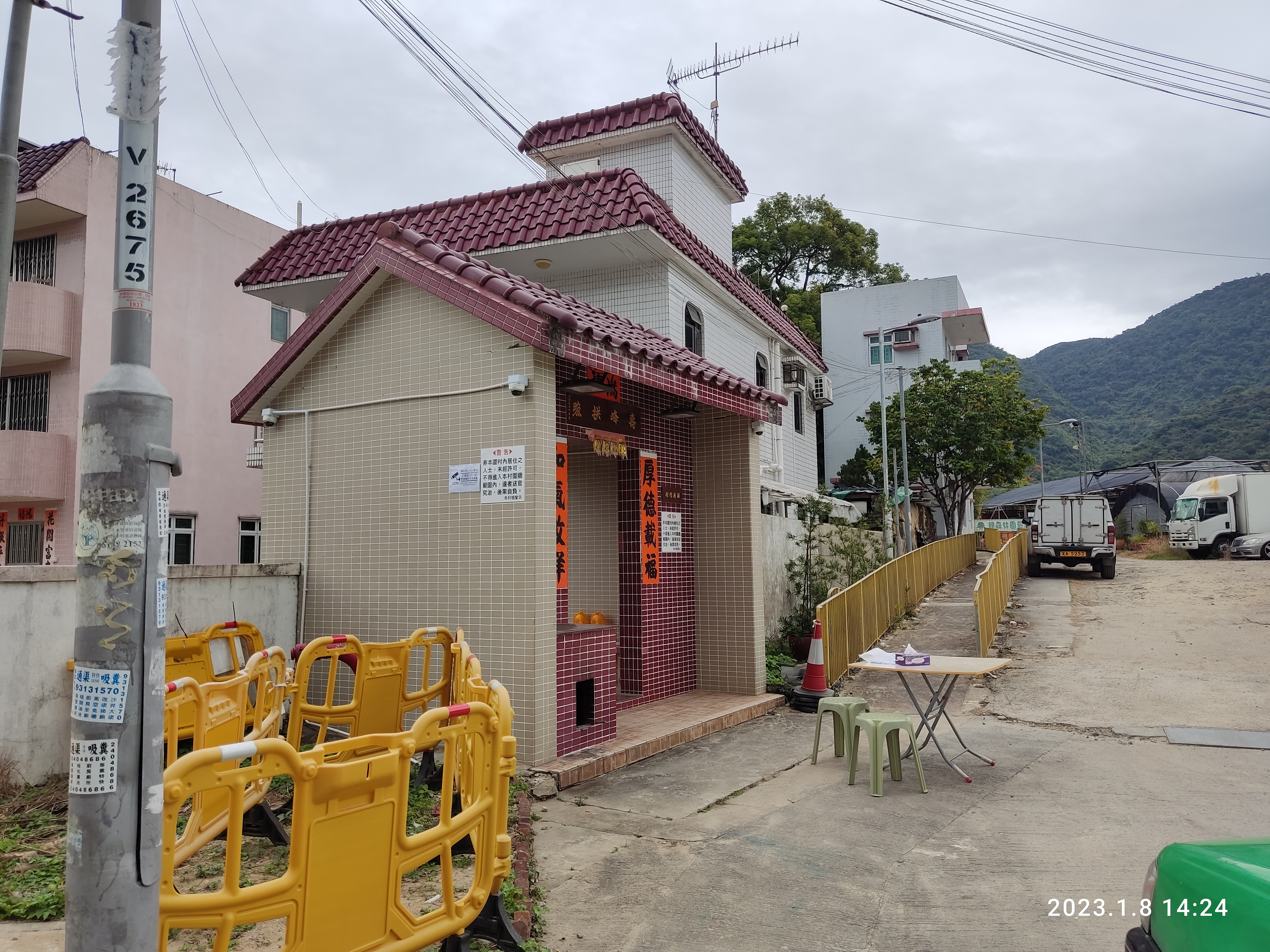
Entrance gate of San Uk Tsai.

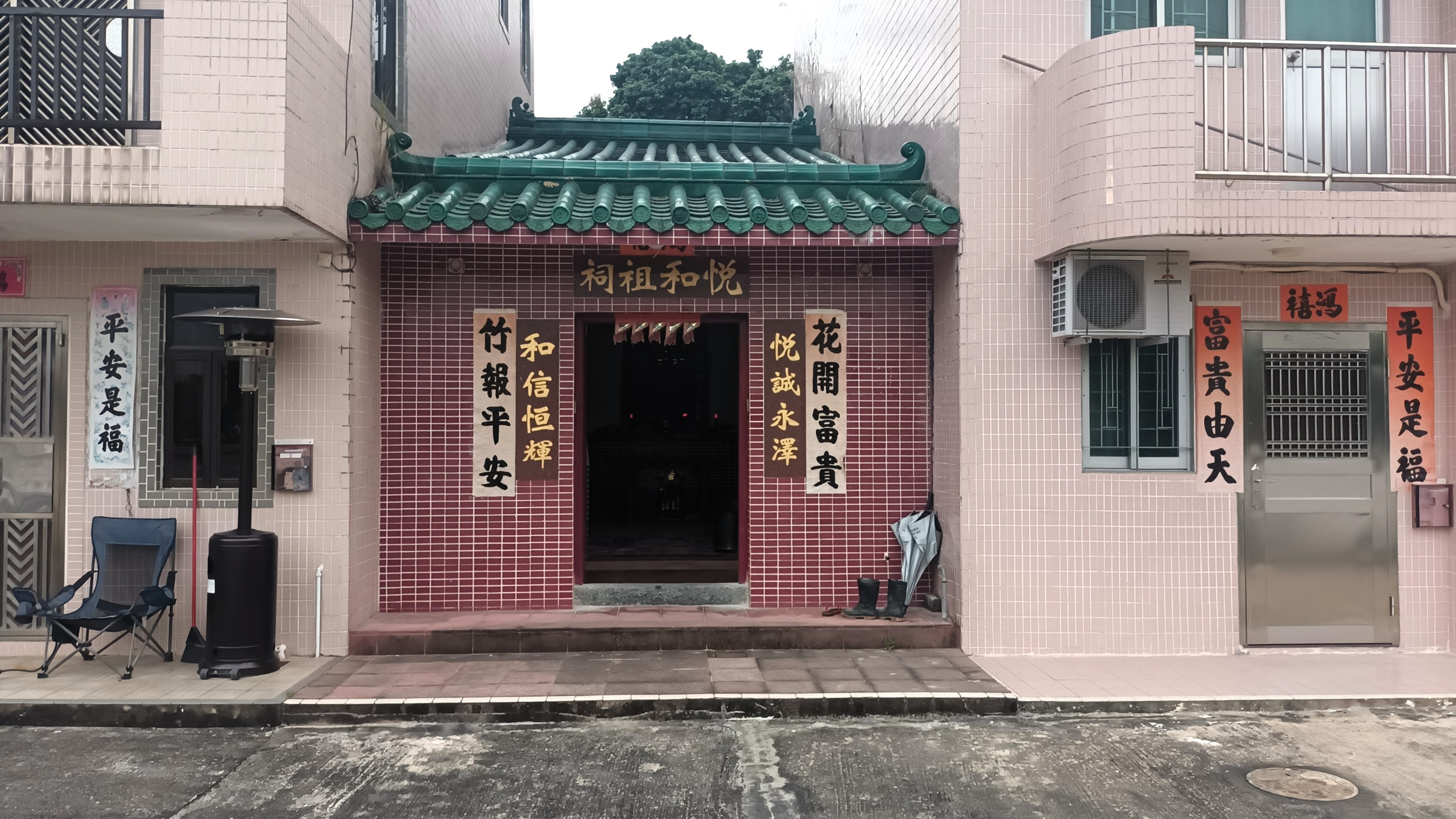
Yuek Wo Ancestral Hall (悅和祖祠) in San Uk Tsai.

San Uk Tsai (Chinese: 新屋仔), also called Tam Chuk Hang San Uk Tsai (丹竹坑新屋仔), is a Hakka walled village in Fanling, North District, New Territories, Hong Kong.

== Administration ==
San Uk Tsai is a recognized village under the New Territories Small House Policy.

== History ==
San Uk Tsai appeared in the 1688 edition of the Gazetteer of Xin'an County. It was therefore probably established before 1688.

== See also ==
- Walled villages of Hong Kong
