= Tsiu Keng =

Coordinates: 22.476100°N 114.105429°E

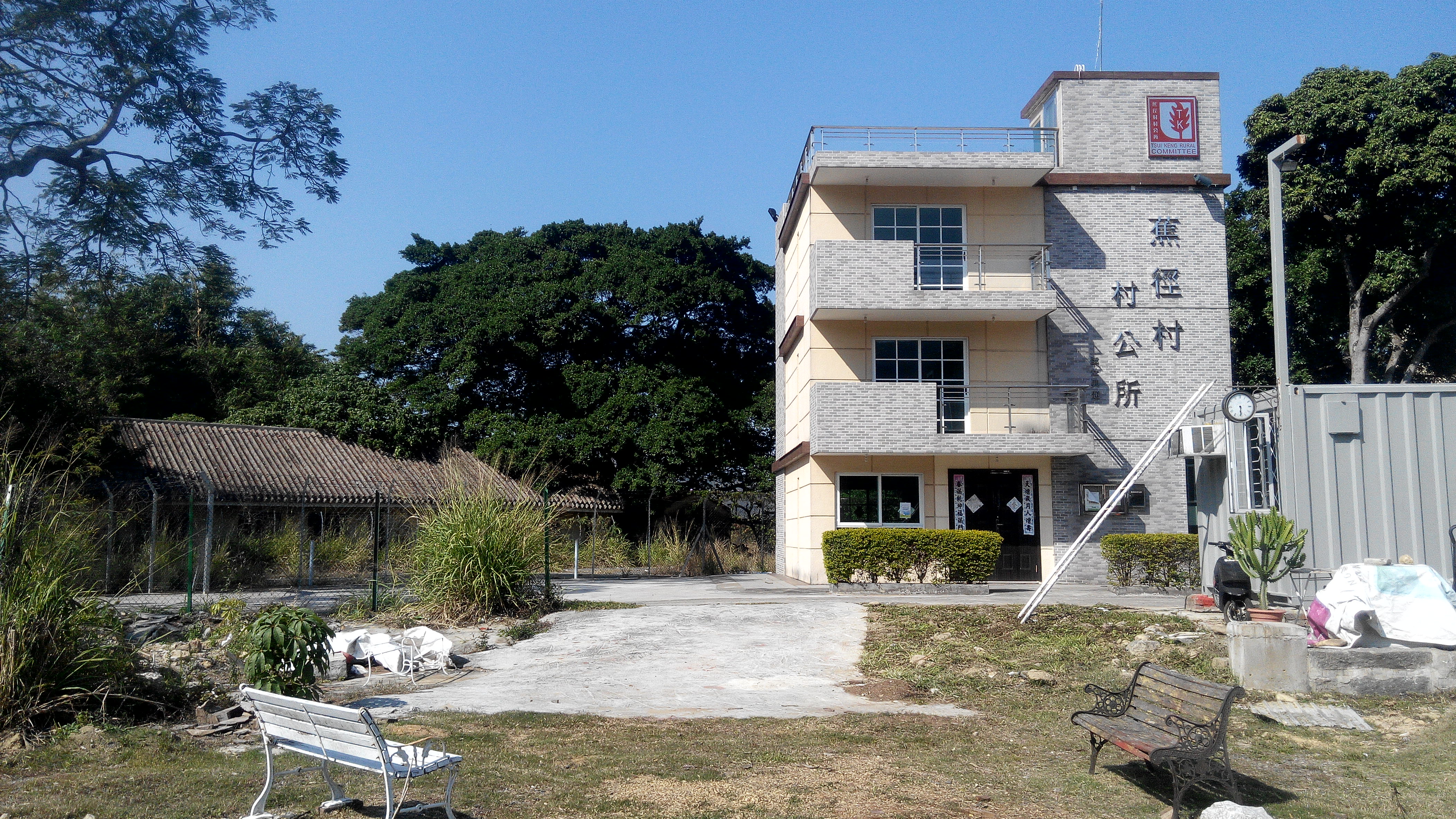
Tsiu Keng Rural Committee office.

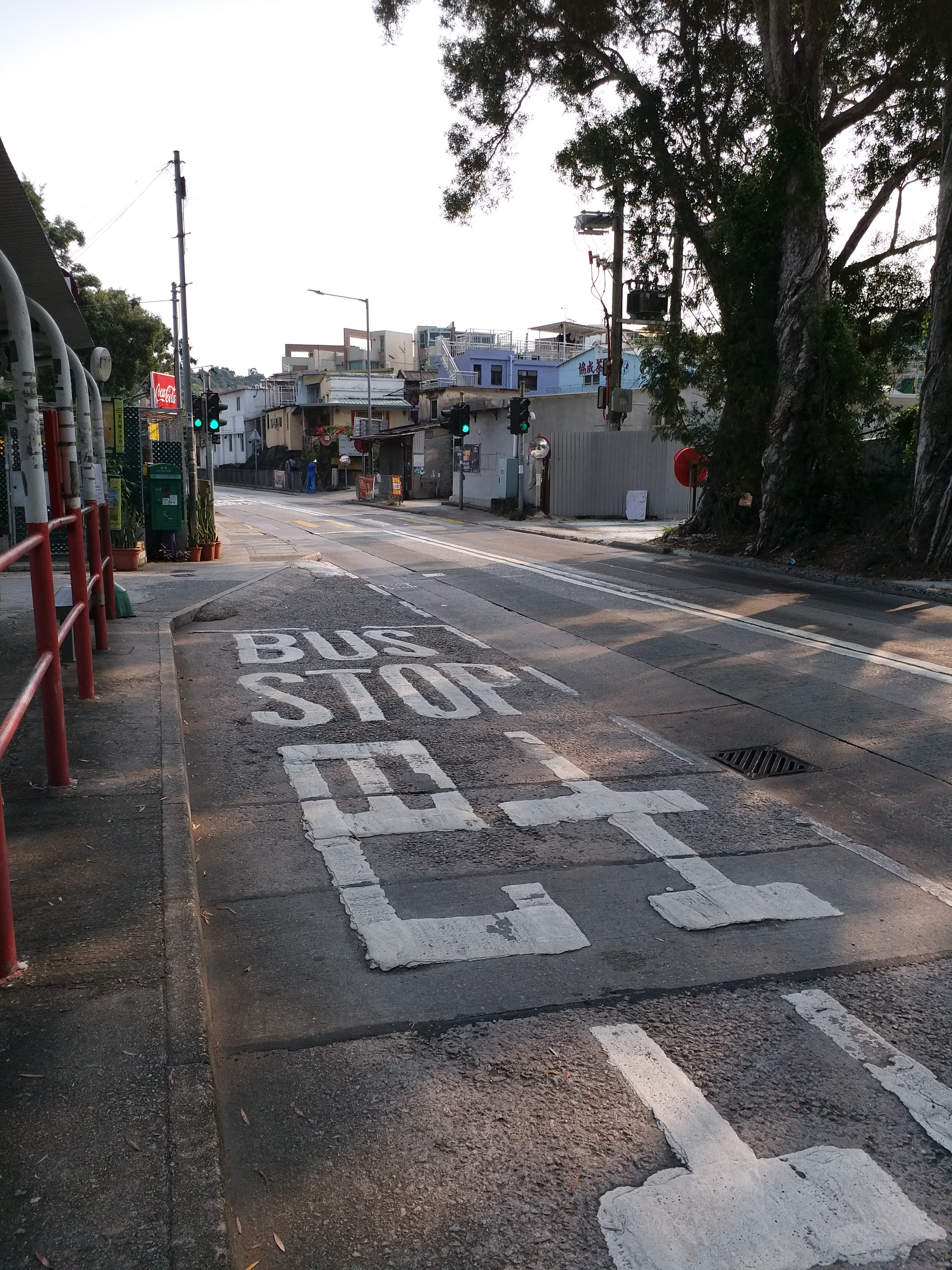
Fan Kam Road near Tsiu Keng.

Tsiu Keng (Chinese: 蕉徑; lit. 'banana lane') is a village in North District, Hong Kong. It is located west of Fan Kam Road and south of the Hong Kong Golf Club in Fanling. It comprises the hamlets Tsiu Keng Lo Wai (蕉徑老圍), Tsiu Keng pan Uk (蕉徑彭屋) and Tsiu Keng San Wai (蕉徑新圍).

== Administration ==
Tsiu Keng is a recognized village under the New Territories Small House Policy. It is one of the villages represented within the Sheung Shui District Rural Committee. For electoral purposes, Tsiu Keng is part of the Sheung Shui Rural constituency, which is currently represented by Simon Hau Fuk-tat.

== History ==
Tsiu Keng Lo Wai is believed to have been founded in the early years of the reign of Guangxu Emperor (1875-1908). Tsiu Keng Pang Uk and Tsiu Keng San Wai were established later by inhabitants of Tsiu Keng Lo Wai, in the early 20th century.

At the time of the 1911 census, the population of Tsiu Keng was 43. The number of males was 15.
