= 新屋 =

新屋 may refer to:

- Araya (disambiguation), several places in Japan
- Niiya (disambiguation), several places in Japan
- San Uk Tsuen (disambiguation), several places in Hong Kong
- Shinya, Japanese given name and surname
- Xinwu District, Taoyuan, district of Taoyuan, Taiwan
