= San Wai (Ha Tsuen) =

Walled village in Hong Kong

San Wai Chinese: 新圍
- Village
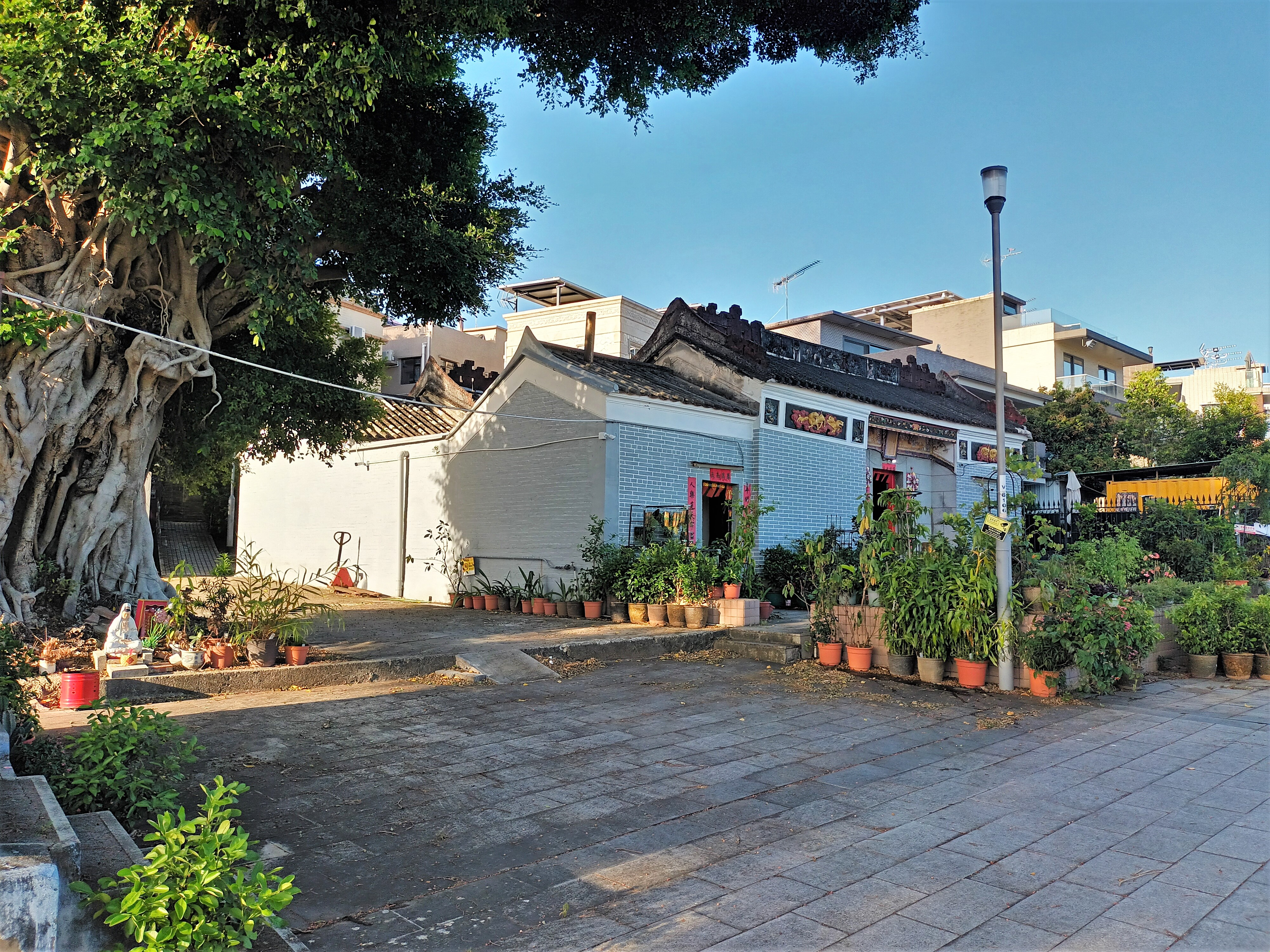
- Yeung Hau Temple (楊侯古廟) in San Wai.

- Location within Hong Kong
- Coordinates: 22.451724°N 113.990628°E
- Country: People's Republic of China
- Special administrative region: Hong Kong
- District: Yuen Long District
- Area: Ha Tsuen
- Time zone: UTC+8:00 (HKT)

San Wai (Chinese: 新圍) is a walled village in Ha Tsuen, Yuen Long District, Hong Kong.

== Administration ==
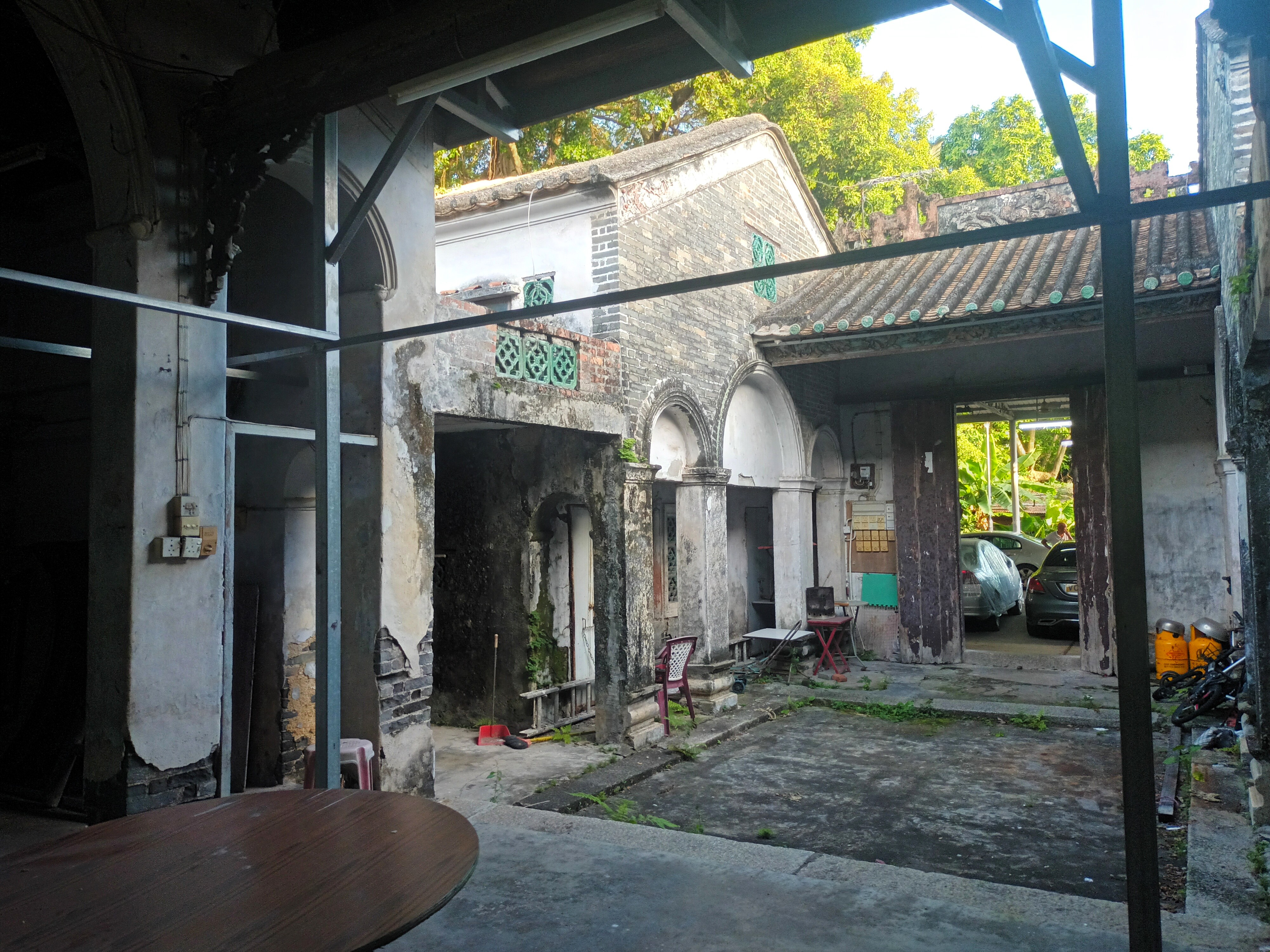
Shi Wang Study Hall (士宏書室) in San Wai (Ha Tsuen)

San Wai is a recognized village under the New Territories Small House Policy. For electoral purposes, San Wai is part of the Ha Tsuen constituency.

== History ==
The village was originally called San Hing Wai (新慶圍)

At the time of the 1911 census, the population of San Wai was 487. The number of males was 215.

== Features ==
The Yeung Hau Temple of San Wai, also called the Sai Tau Miu (西頭廟; 'the western temple'), was renovated in 1901. It serves as the social venue which plays the dual roles as a temple and an ancestral hall of San Wai. Basin meal feasts are organized in front of the Temple during Yeung Hau Festival and Lunar New Year.

Shi Wang Study Hall (士宏書室), also transliterated as Sze Wang Study Hall.

== See also ==
- Walled villages of Hong Kong
- Hong Mei Tsuen, Lo Uk Tsuen, Sik Kong Tsuen: adjacent villages
- Sik Kong Wai, Tseung Kong Wai: nearby walled villages
