= Hong Mei Tsuen =

Village of Hong Kong

Coordinates: 22.452409°N 113.991887°E

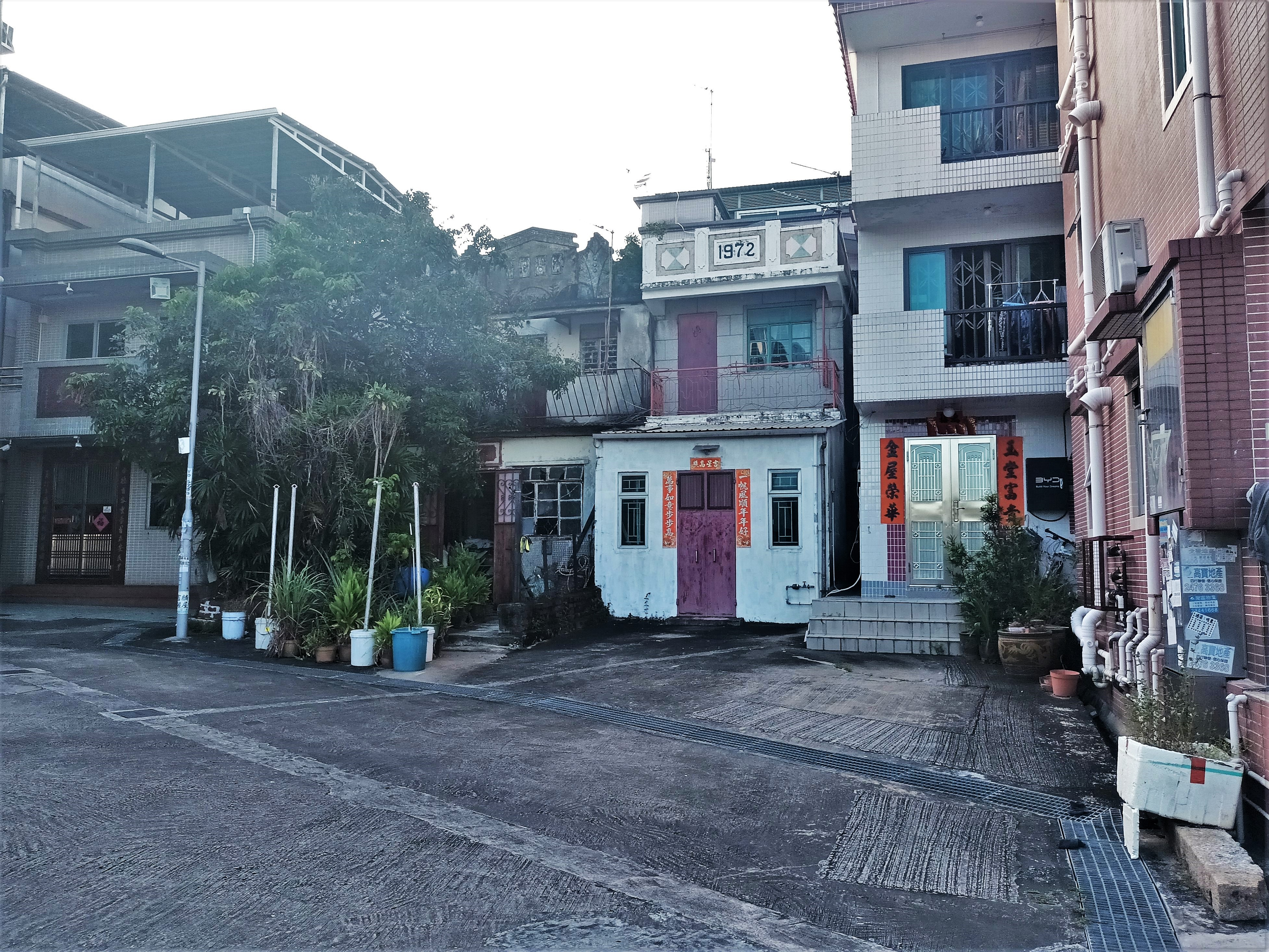
Hong Mei Tsuen

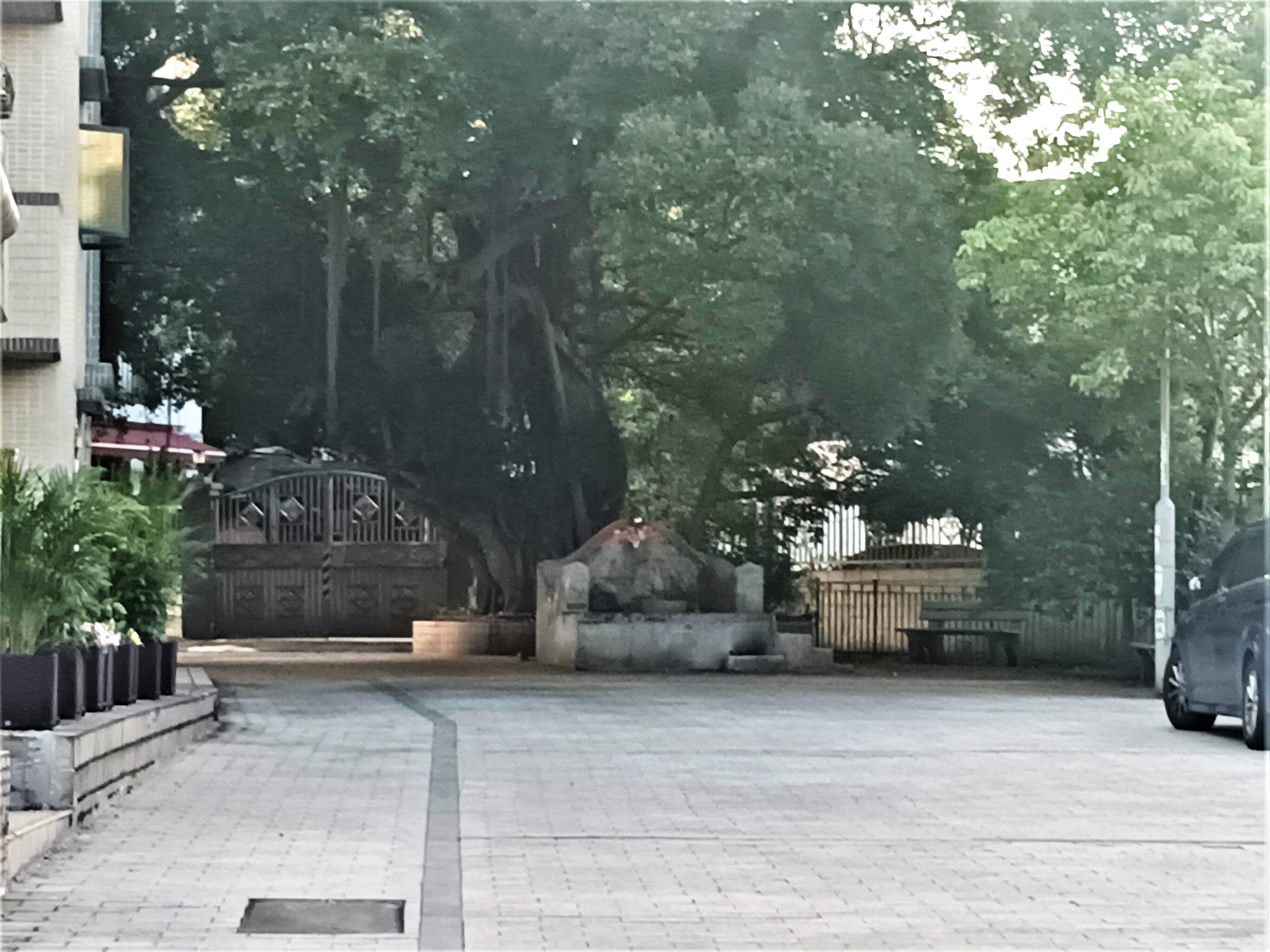
Shrine in Hong Mei Tsuen

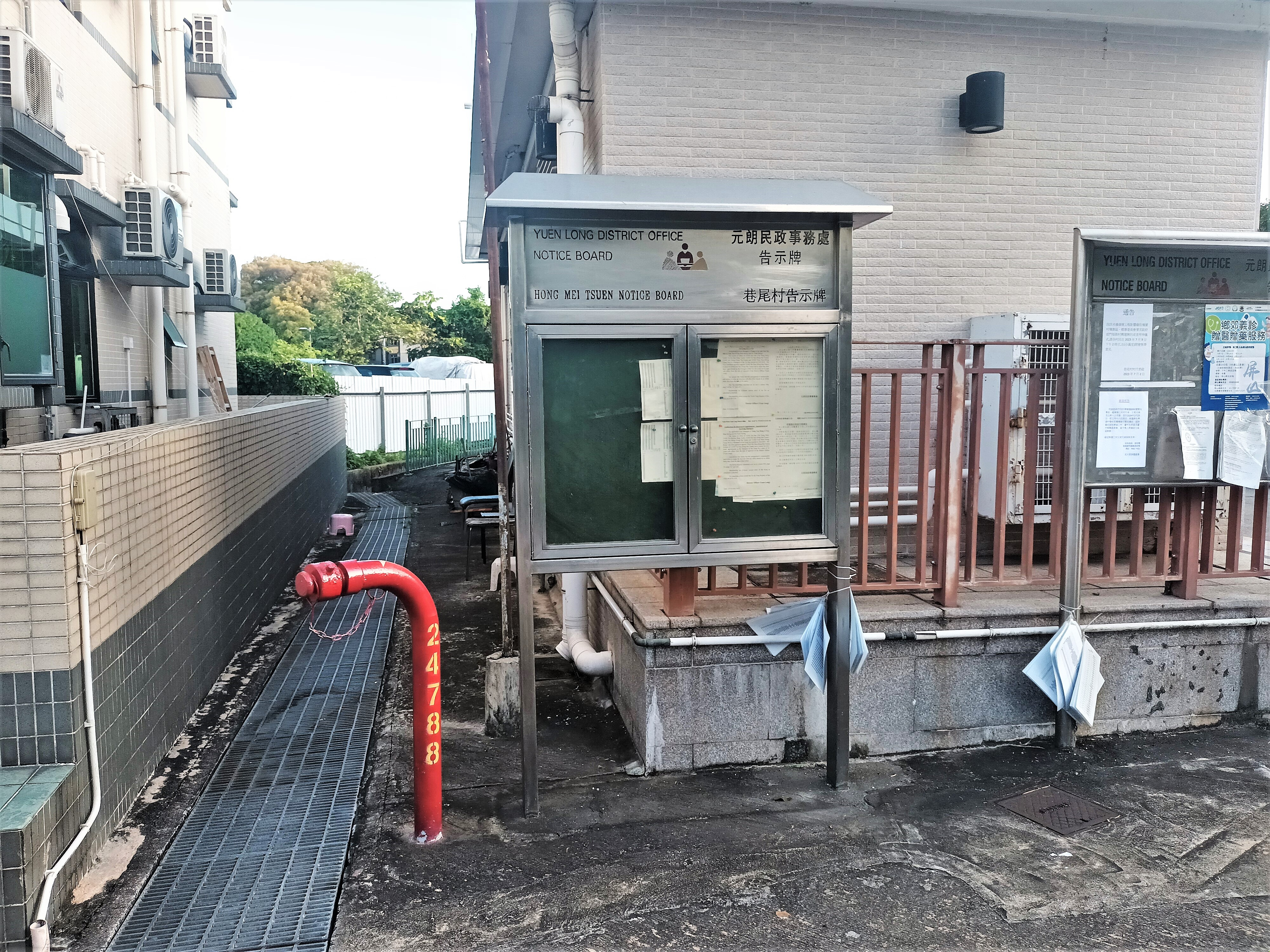
Village notice board in Hong Mei Tsuen

Hong Mei Tsuen (Chinese: 巷尾村) is a village in Ha Tsuen, Yuen Long District, Hong Kong.

== Administration ==
Hong Mei Tsuen is a recognized village under the New Territories Small House Policy.

== History ==
At the time of the 1911 census, the population of Hong Mei Tsuen was 52. The number of males was 21.

== Features ==
The Yeung Hau Temple in Ha Tsuen (廈村楊侯宮) also known as Tung Tau Miu (東頭廟; 'eastern temple'), and located in nearby Tung Tau Tsuen, was built before 1871. It is believed to have been built by the local Tang clan of Tung Tau Sam Tsuen (東頭三村; 'three villages in the east'), comprising Tung Tau Tsuen, Lo Uk Tsuen and Hong Mei Tsuen. It was declared a monument in 1988.

== See also ==
- Lo Uk Tsuen, San Wai, Tung Tau Tsuen: adjacent villages
