= Tung Tau Tsuen =

Tung Tau Tsuen (Chinese: 東頭村) is the name of several features in Hong Kong:

- Tung Tau Tsuen (Yuen Long Kau Hui), a village in the Yuen Long Kau Hui area, next to Yuen Long Station, Yuen Long
- Tung Tau Tsuen (Ha Tsuen), a village in the Ha Tsuen area, this one closer to Tin Shui Wai Station, Yuen Long
- Tung Tau Tsuen (Kowloon), a village that was located in Kowloon
- Tung Tau Tsuen Road, a street in Kowloon City District and Wong Tai Sin District of Hong Kong
- Tung Tau Estate, a public housing estate on that road

See also:

- Tung Tau Wai, a village in Wang Chau, Yuen Long District
- Tung Tau Wai San Tsuen (lit. 'Tung Tau Wai New Village'), adjacent to Tung Tau Wai
