= Lo Uk Tsuen =

Lo Uk Tsuen or Lo Uk is the name or part of the name of several villages in Hong Kong, including:

- Lo Uk Tsuen (Ha Tsuen), in the Ha Tsuen area of Yuen Long District
- Lo Uk Tsuen (Tsing Yi), on Tsing Yi island
- Pui O Lo Uk Tsuen, on Lantau Island
- Wang Toi Shan Lo Uk Tsuen, in the Pat Heung area of Yuen Long District
