= Sik Kong Wai =

Coordinates: 22.449158°N 113.991985°E

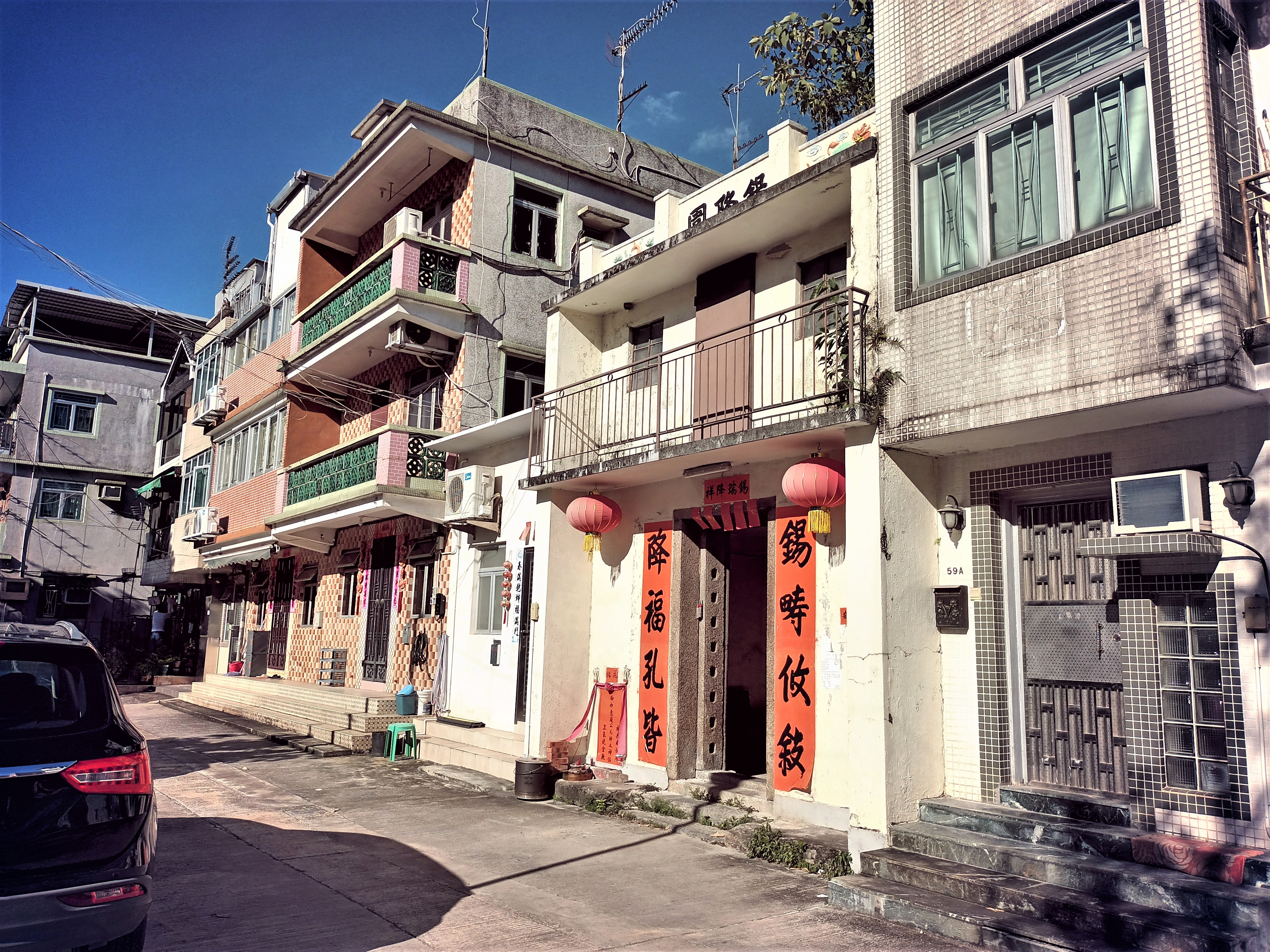
Entrance gate of Sik Kong Wai.

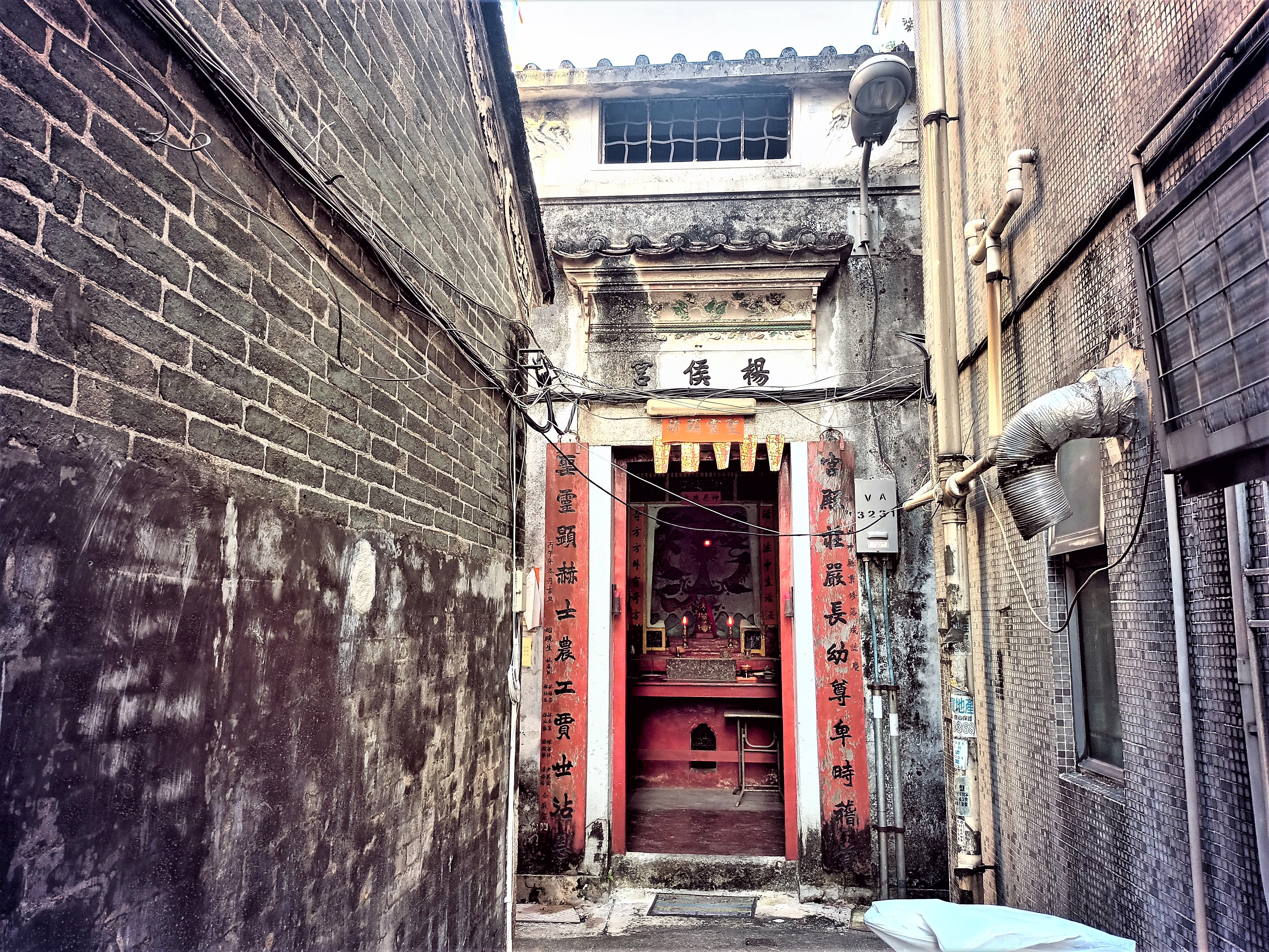
Yeung Hau Temple, main shrine of Sik Kong Wai. Located at the end of the central axis of the walled village.

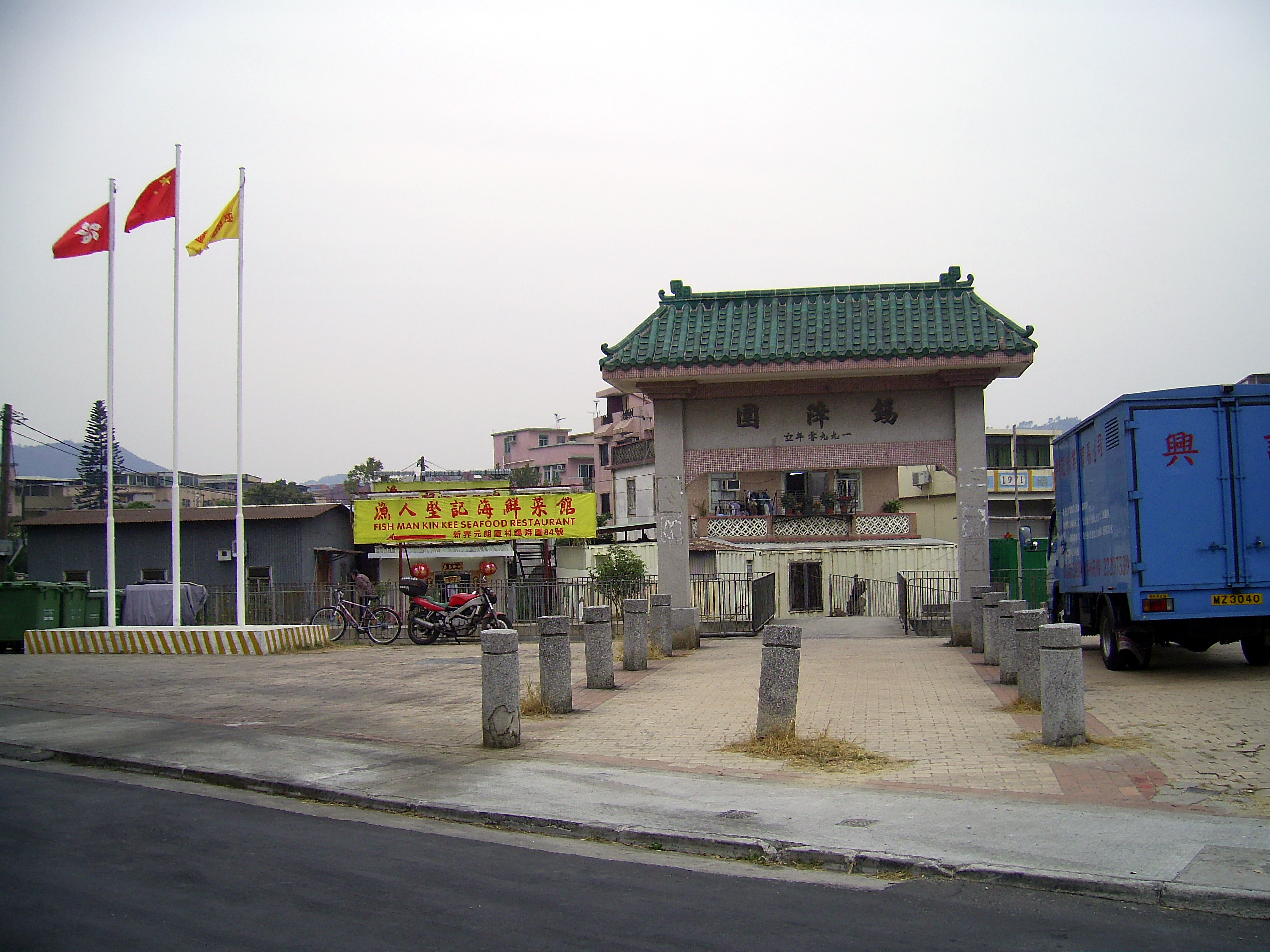
Paifang of Sik Kong Wai in January 2009.

Sik Kong Wai (Chinese: 錫降圍) is a walled village in Ha Tsuen, Yuen Long District, Hong Kong.

== Administration ==
Sik Kong Wai is a recognized village under the New Territories Small House Policy.

== History ==
Sik Kong Wai was one of the old villages of the Tang Clan who moved from Kam Tin in the late 14th and early 15th centuries. The village was founded by the descendants of Tang Tiu-yuet (鄧釣月).

== See also ==
- Walled villages of Hong Kong
- San Wai (Ha Tsuen)
- Sik Kong Tsuen
