= Sik Kong Tsuen =

Coordinates: 22.45053°N 113.992048°E

Sik Kong Tsuen (Chinese: 錫降村) is a village Ha Tsuen, Yuen Long District, Hong Kong.

== Administration ==
Sik Kong Tsuen is a recognized village under the New Territories Small House Policy.

== History ==
At the time of the 1911 census, the population of Sik Kong Tsuen was 381. The number of males was 178.

== See also ==
- San Wai (Ha Tsuen)
- Sik Kong Wai
