= Ling To Monastery =

Former Buddhist monastery in Hong Kong

Coordinates: 22.440511°N 113.979558°E

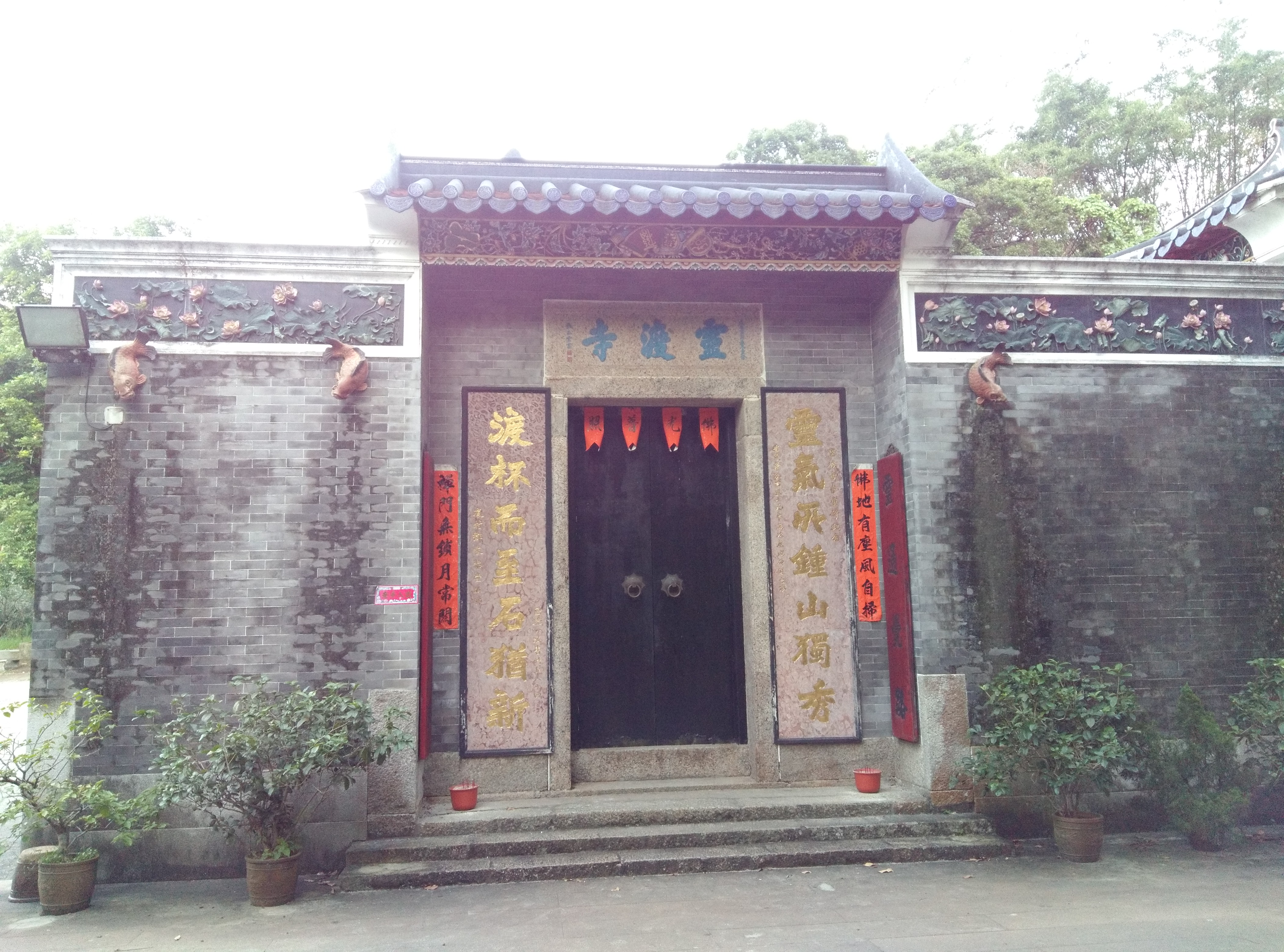
Ling To Monastery

Ling To Monastery or Ling To Tsz (Chinese: 靈渡寺) is a former Buddhist monastery in Ha Tsuen, Yuen Long District, Hong Kong.

== History ==
Ling To Monastery is one of the oldest monasteries in Hong Kong. It was legendarily built by a monk Bei Du (杯渡禪師) in the Eastern Jin dynasty (317-420). He first came to Castle Peak and later to Ling To Mountain (靈渡山) where he built the monastery. The original monastery was at the back of the present site but it was abandoned due to the dilapidation of the old structure. The current monastery was built in 1927.

== Conservation ==
Ling To Monastery is a Grade III historic building.
