= Shinya =

Shinya (Shin'ya) is a Japanese given name, usually for males. It is pronounced as "Shin-ya", not "Shi-nya". Notable people with the name include:

- Shinya Abe (阿部 晋也; born 1980), Japanese curler and curling coach
- Shinya Adachi (足立 信也; born 1957), Japanese politician
- Shinya Aoki (青木 真也; born 1983), professional mixed martial artist
- Shinya Arino (有野 晋哉; born 1972), Osaka comedian part of Yoiko (よゐこ, Yowiko) and host of GameCenter CX
- Shinya Fukumori (福盛 進也; born 1984), Japanese jazz drummer and composer
- Shinya Hamazoe (浜添 伸也; born 1987), Japanese voice actor
- Shinya Hashimoto (橋本 真也; 1965–2005), professional wrestler
- Shinya Katabuchi (片渕 慎弥; born 1983), Japanese judoka
- Shinya Kayama (嘉弥真 新也; born 1989), Japanese professional baseball player
- Shinya Kimura, bike builder
- Shinya Kumazaki (熊崎 信也; born 1979), Japanese video game director and designer
- Shinya Makabe (真壁 伸也; born 1972), professional wrestler, known professionally as Togi Makabe (真壁 刀義)
- Shinya Matsuda, a voice actor
- Shinya Nakamura (仲邑 信也; born 1973), professional Go player
- Shinya Nakano (中野 真矢; born 1977), motorcycle racer
- Shinya Ōtaki (大滝 進矢; born 1953), a Japanese voice actor
- Shinya Saito (齊藤 慎弥; born 1980), Japanese biathlete
- Shinya Sato (disambiguation), multiple people
- Shin'ya Takahashi (高橋 伸也; born 1978), Japanese voice actor
- Shinya Takahashi (高橋 伸也; born 1963), a video game producer
- Shinya Taniguchi (谷口 晋矢; 1981–2013), Japanese swimmer
- Shinya Tsukamoto (塚本 晋也; 1960), film director and actor
- Shinya Ueda (上田 晋也; born 1970), Japanese comedian and television presenter
- Shinya Yabusaki (薮崎 真哉; born 1978), Japanese footballer
- Shinya Yajima (矢島 慎也; born 1994), Japanese footballer
- Shin'ya Yamamoto (山本 真也; born 1971), Japanese shogi player
- Shinya Yamanaka (山中 伸弥; born 1962), cell biologist
- Shinya (Luna Sea musician) (1970–2026), drummer of the band Luna Sea
- Shinya (Dir En Grey musician) (born 1978), drummer of the band Dir En Grey

Fictional characters:

- Shinya Aiba, Tekkaman Evil
- Shinya Kogami, Psycho-Pass
- Shinya Hiragi, Owari no Seraph
- Shinya Mizorogi, Ultraman Nexus
- Shinya Oda, Persona 5
- Shinya kurai, Mogeko castle

Shinya or Shin'ya (written: 新谷 or 新屋) is also a Japanese surname. Notable people with the surname include:

- Shihomi Shinya (新谷 志保美; born 1979), Japanese speed skater
- Tateki Shinya (新屋 干城; born 1958), Japanese swimmer
