= Fung Kong Tsuen =

Coordinates: 22.457809°N 113.98605°E

Fung Kong Tsuen (Chinese: 鳳降村) is a village in Ha Tsuen, Yuen Long District, Hong Kong.

== Administration ==
Fung Kong Tsuen is a recognized village under the New Territories Small House Policy.

== History ==
At the time of the 1911 census, the population of Fung Kong Tsuen was 76. The number of males was 34.
