= Sha Kong Wai =

Village in Ha Tsuen, Yuen Long District, Hong Kong

Coordinates: 22.463893°N 113.990761°E

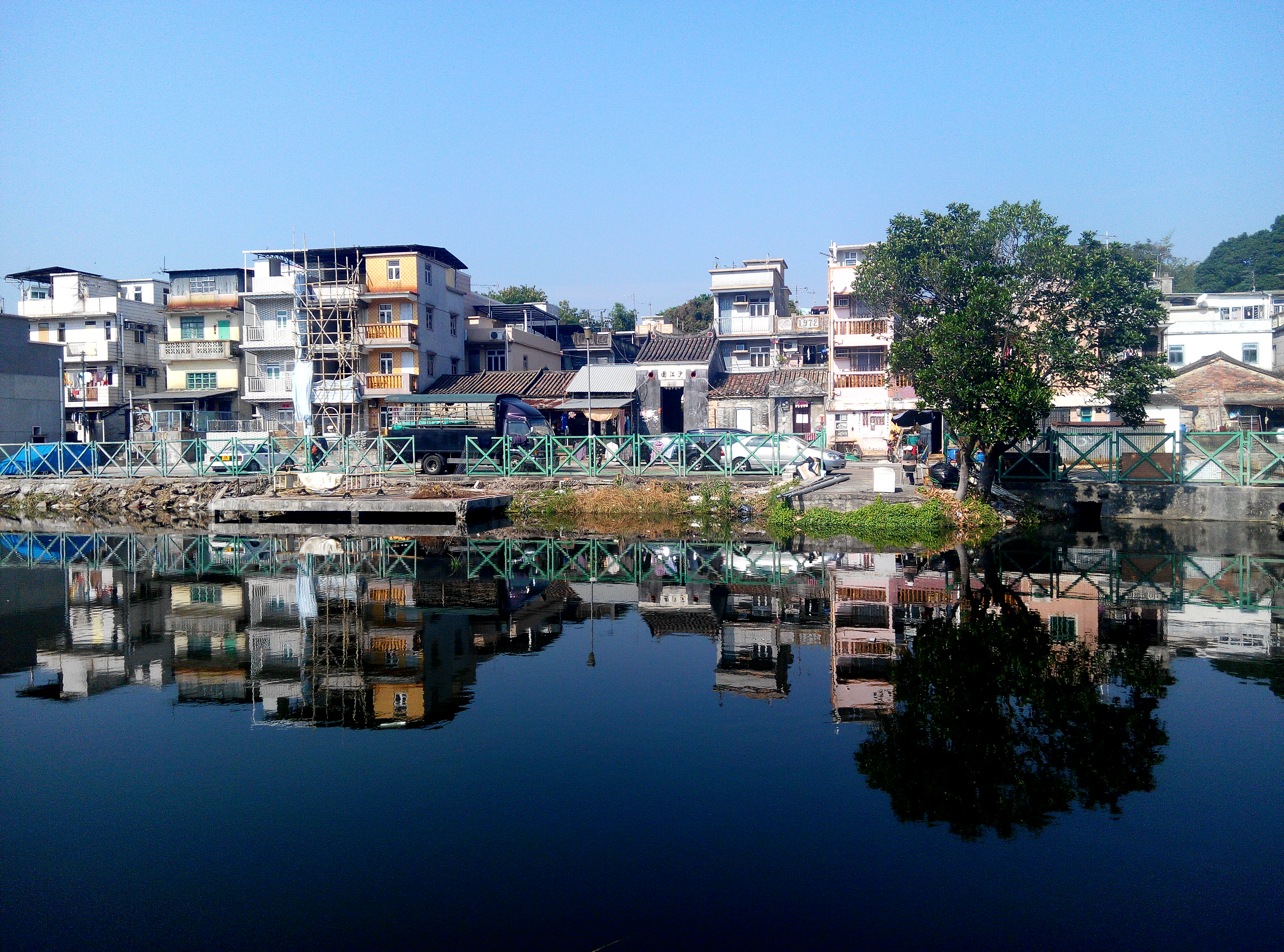
Sha Kong Wai and its pond in December 2014.

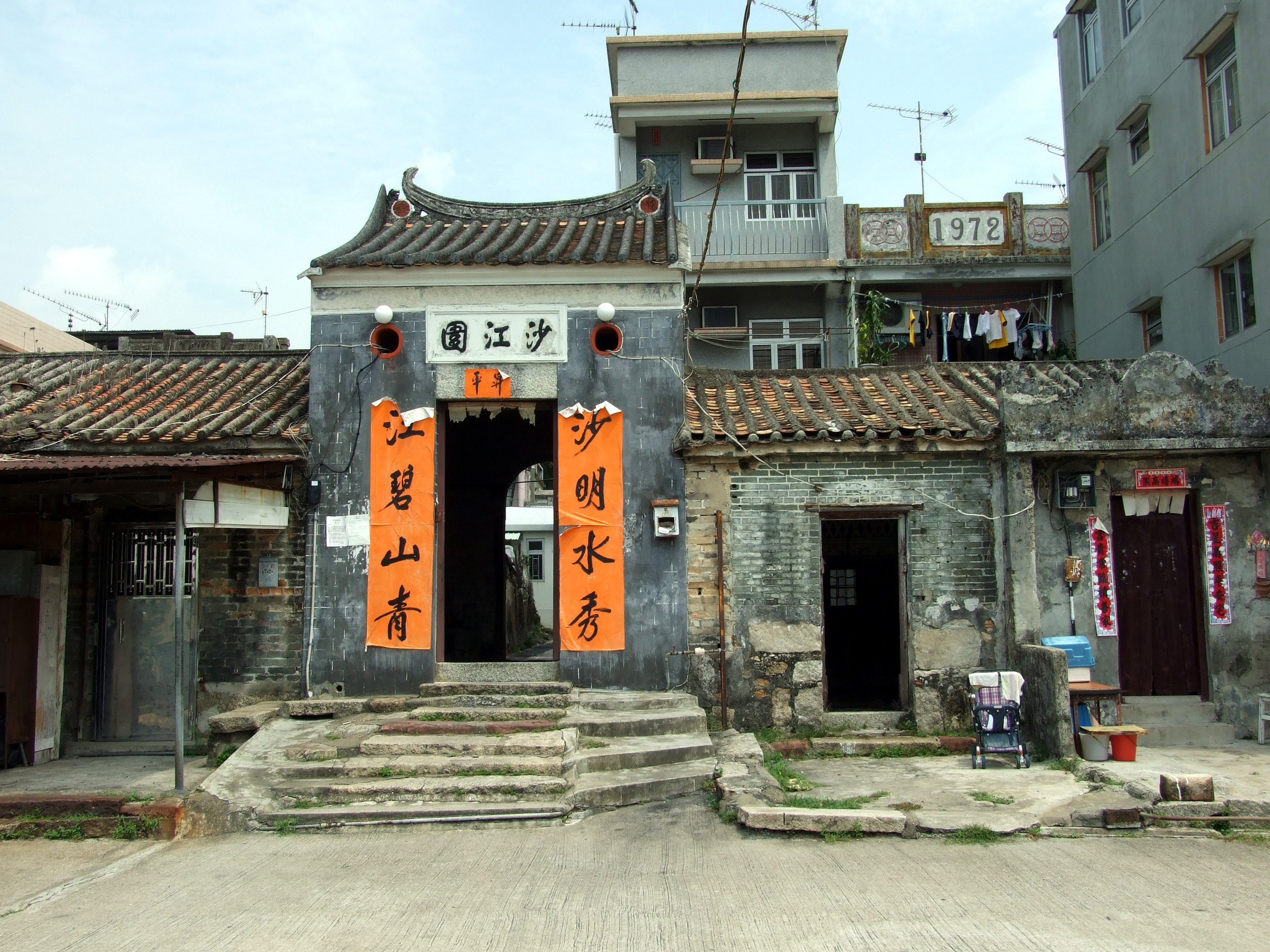
Entrance gate of Sha Kong Wai in June 2009.

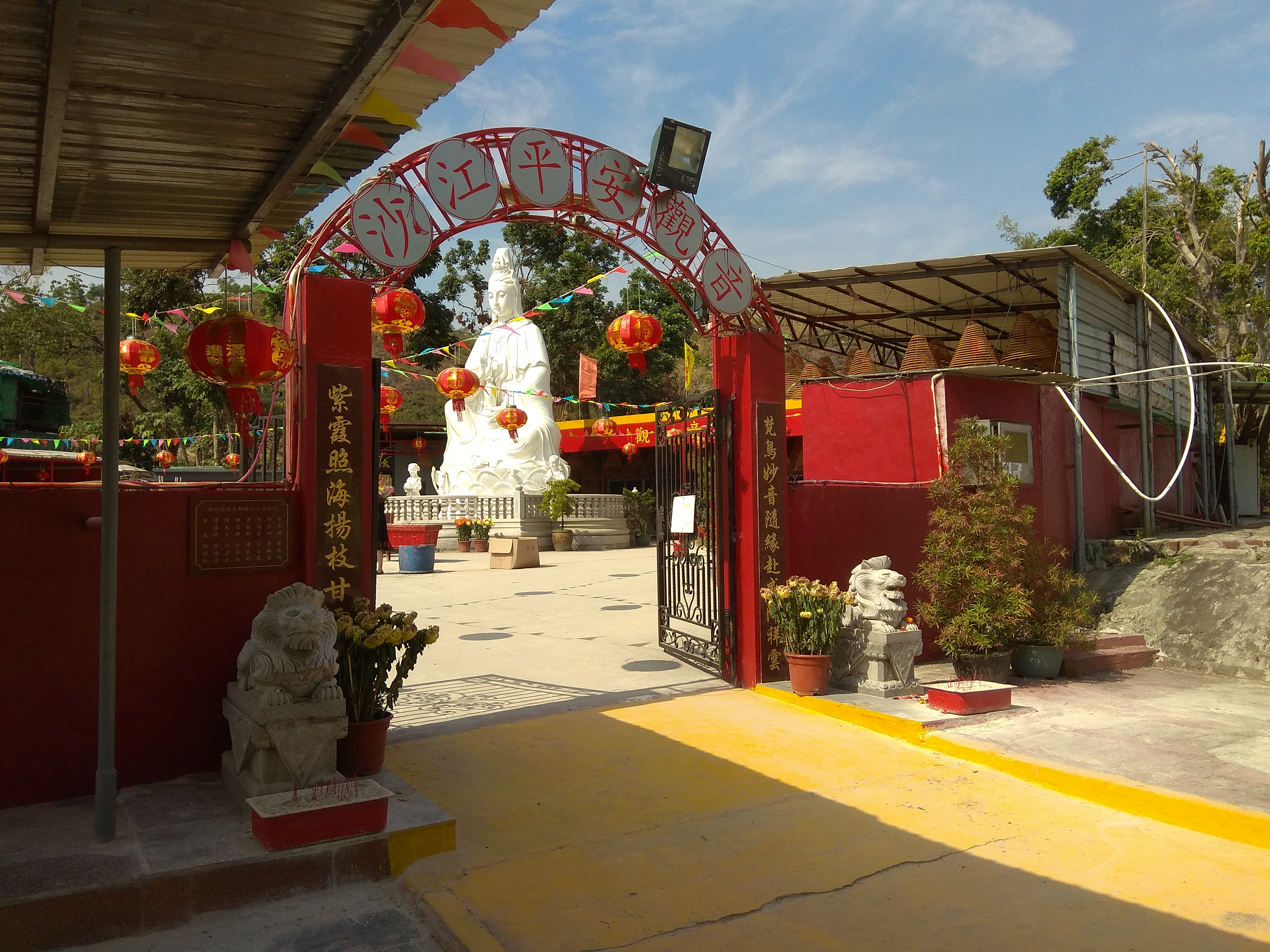
Sha Kong Ping An Guan Yin Temple in 2019.

Sha Kong Wai (Chinese: 沙江圍; lit. 'walled village of sandy river') is a village in Ha Tsuen, Yuen Long District, Hong Kong. Part of it is a historic walled village.

== Administration ==
Sha Kong Wai is a recognized village under the New Territories Small House Policy. It is one of the 37 villages represented within the Ping Shan Rural Committee. For electoral purposes, Sha Kong Wai is part of the Ping Shan North constituency.

== History ==
The village was probably founded in the 17th century, in the late Ming Dynasty.

== See also ==
- Walled villages of Hong Kong
