= San Sang Tsuen =

Village of Hong Kong

Coordinates: 22.43993°N 113.990932°E

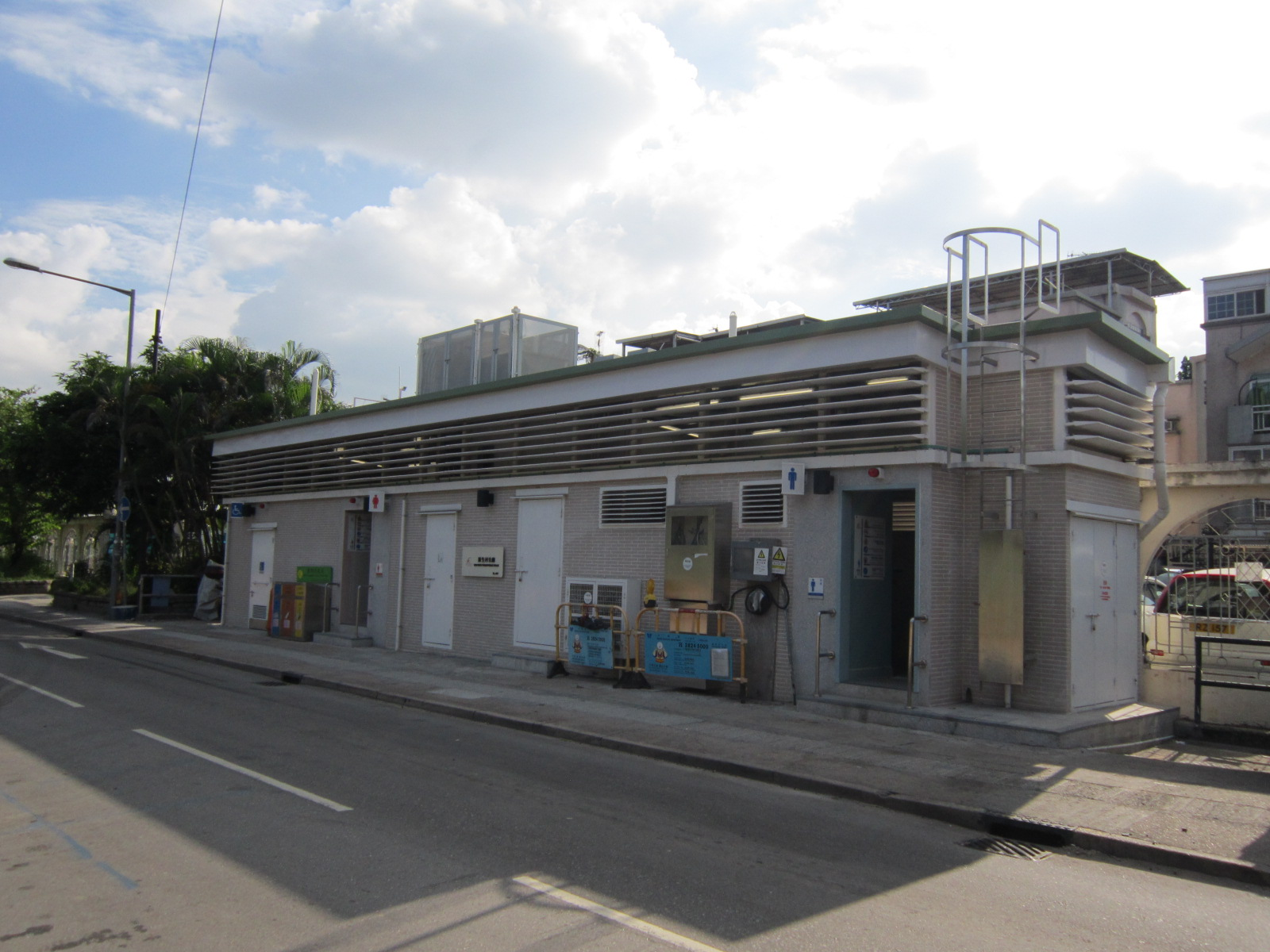
Public toilet in San Sang Tsuen in September 2013

San Sang Tsuen (Chinese: 新生村) is a village in Ha Tsuen, Yuen Long District, Hong Kong.

== Administration ==
San Sang Tsuen is a recognized village under the New Territories Small House Policy.
