= San Uk Tsuen =

San Uk Tsuen (Chinese: 新屋村) may refer to several places in Hong Kong:

- San Uk Tsuen (Tsing Yi), a village in Tsing Yi, Kwai Tsing District, Hong Kong
- San Uk Tsuen (Wu Kau Tang), a village in North District, Hong Kong
- San Uk Tsuen (Lung Yeuk Tau), a village in Lung Yeuk Tau, North District, Hong Kong
- San Uk Tsuen (Yuen Long District), a village in Yuen Long District, Hong Kong
- Wang Toi Shan Ha San Uk Tsuen, a village in Yuen Long District, Hong Kong
