= Ha Tsuen =

Area at the west of Yuen Long Town in Hong Kong

Coordinates: 22.44685°N 113.98680°E

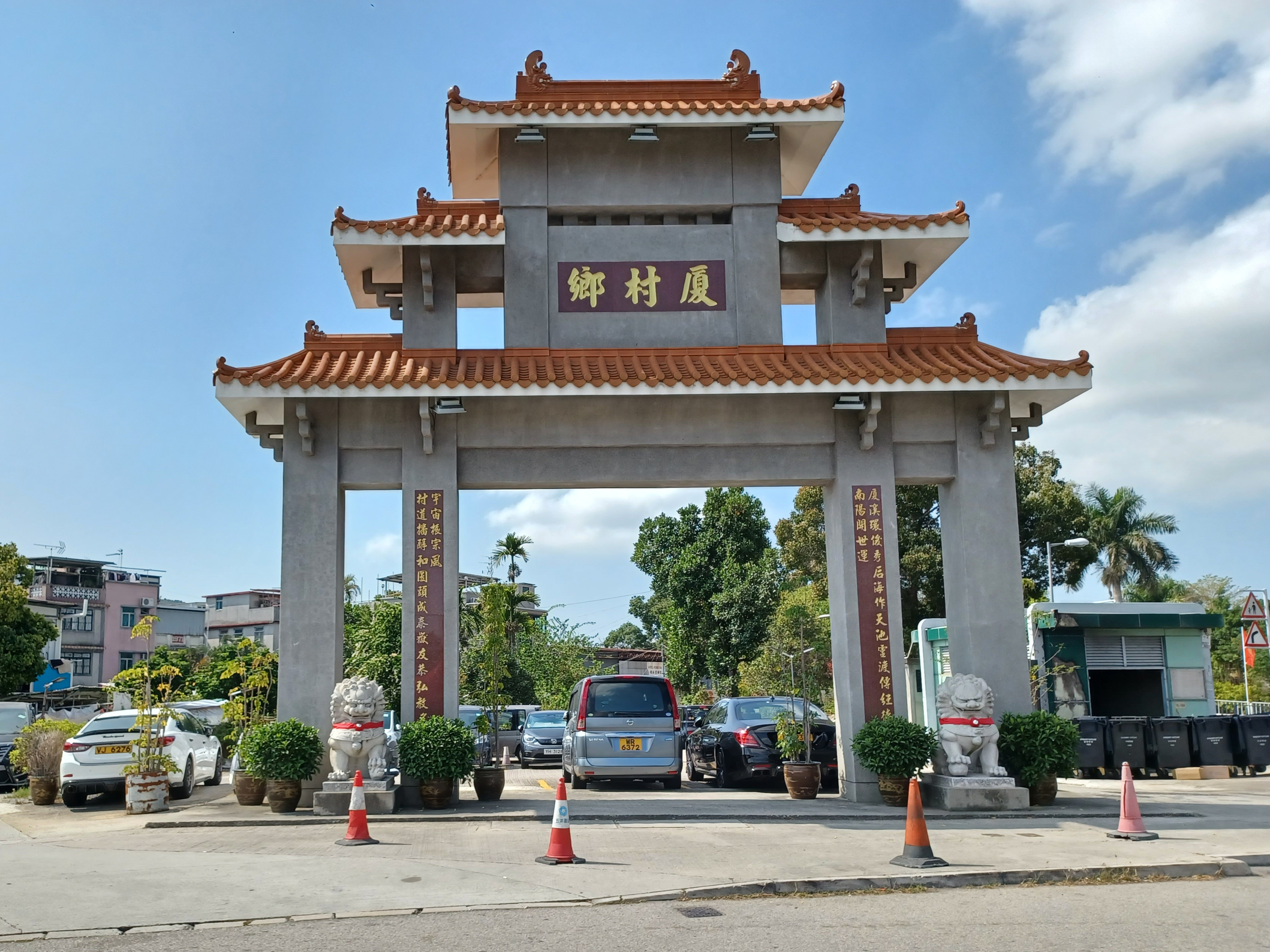
Paifang of Ha Tsuen.

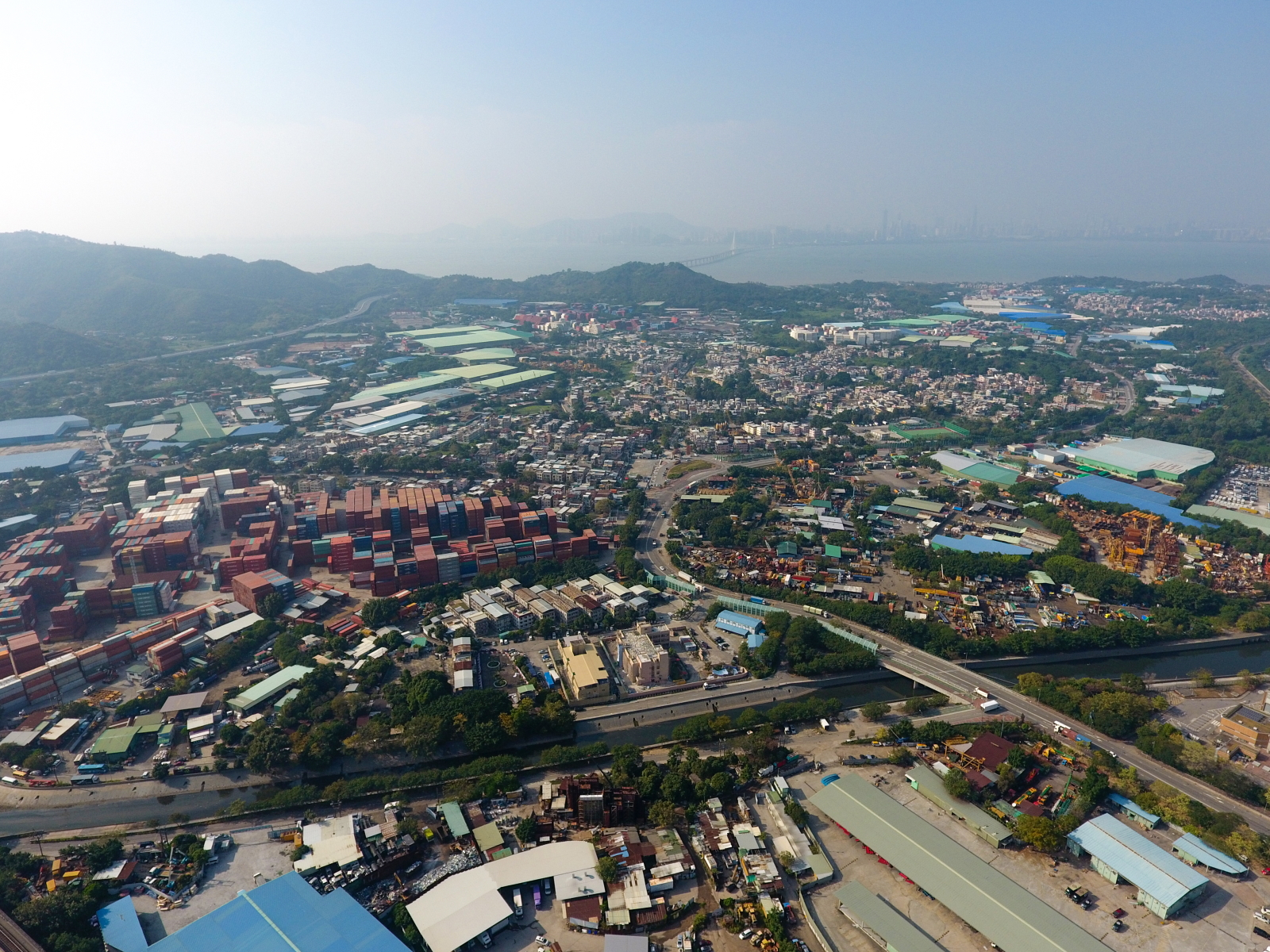
Ha Tsuen surrounded by container yard.

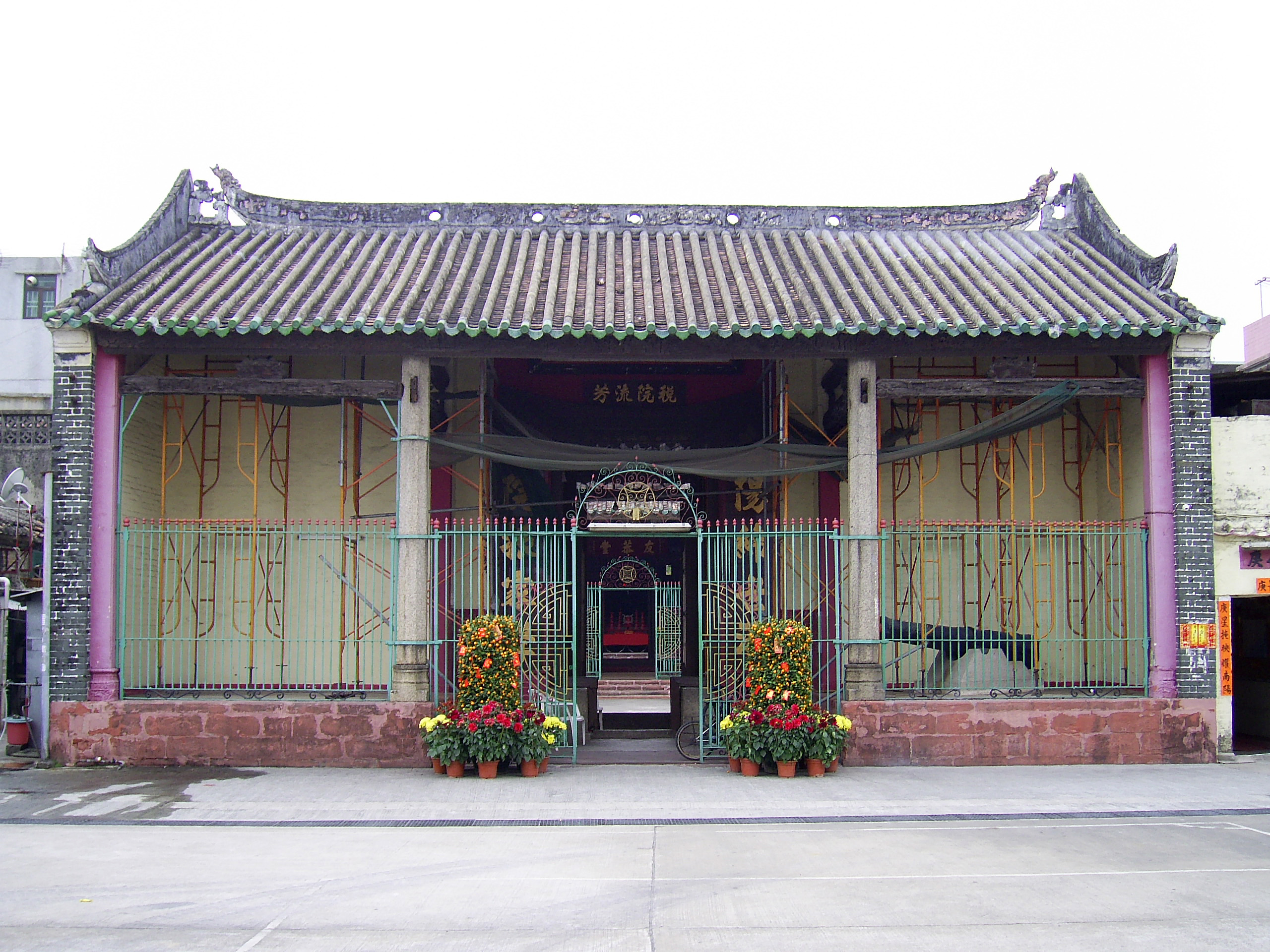
Tang Ancestral Hall in Ha Tsuen Shi, a declared monument.

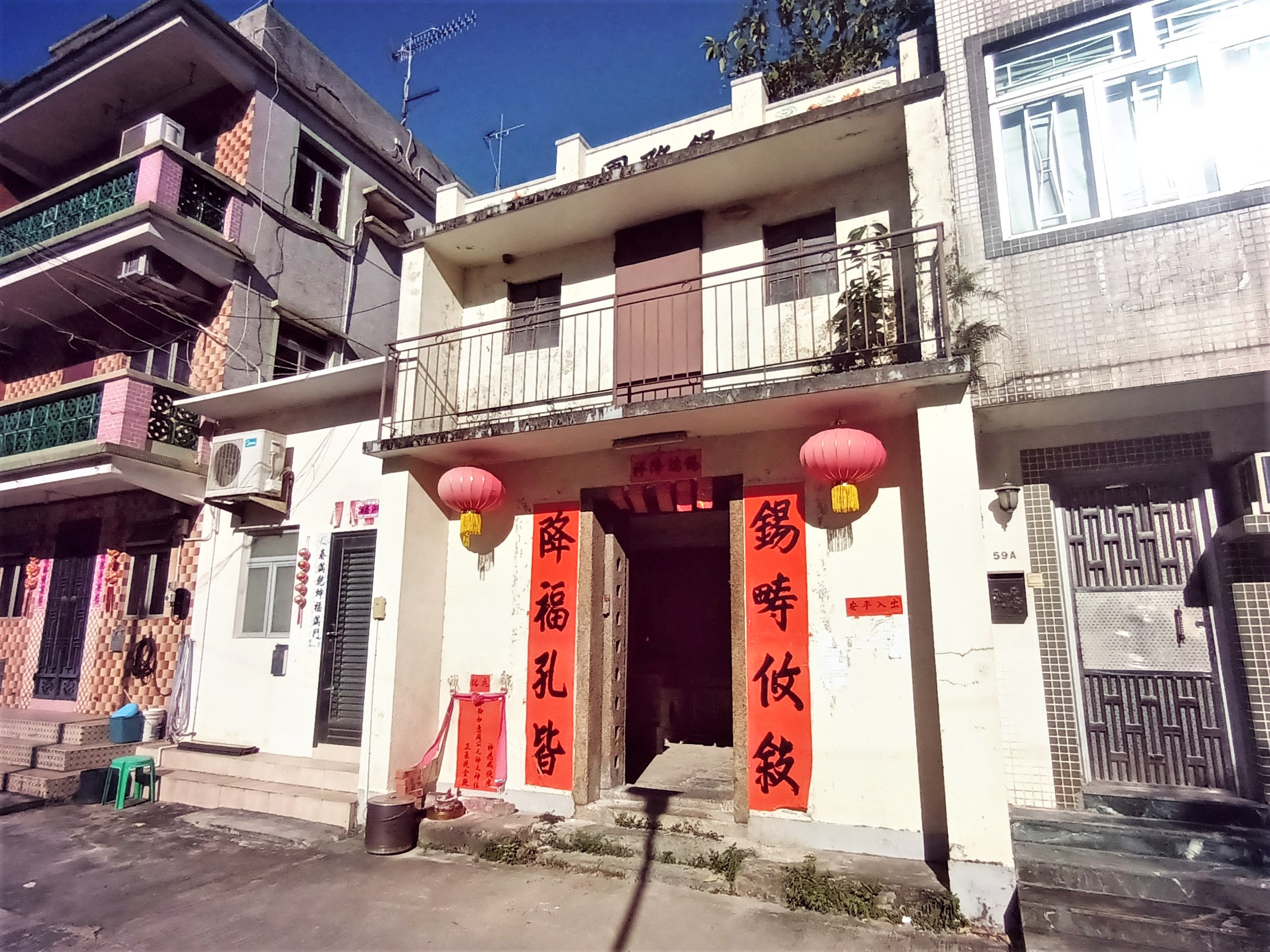
Entrance gate of Sik Kong Wai, a walled village.

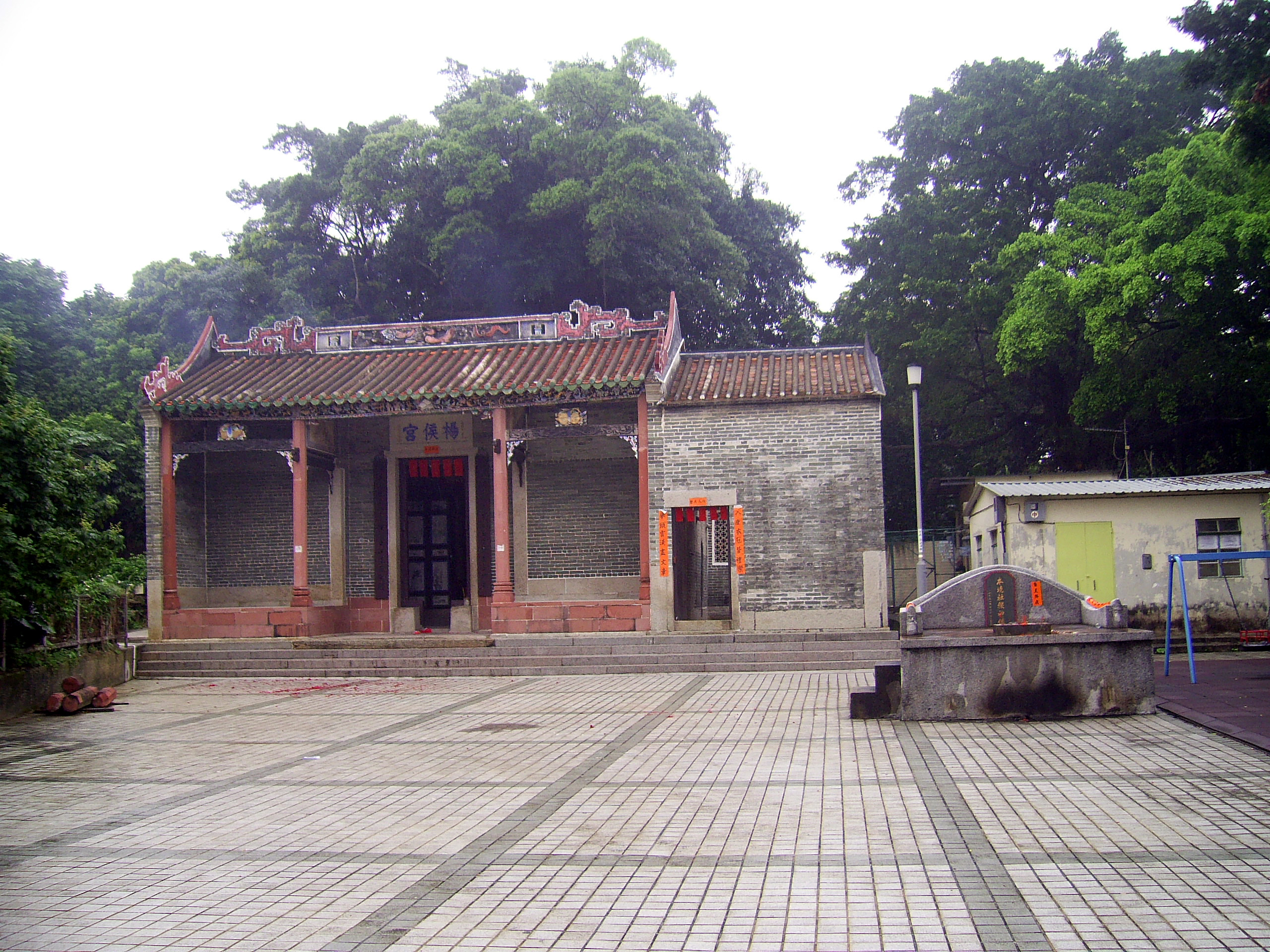
Yeung Hau Temple in Tung Tau Tsuen.

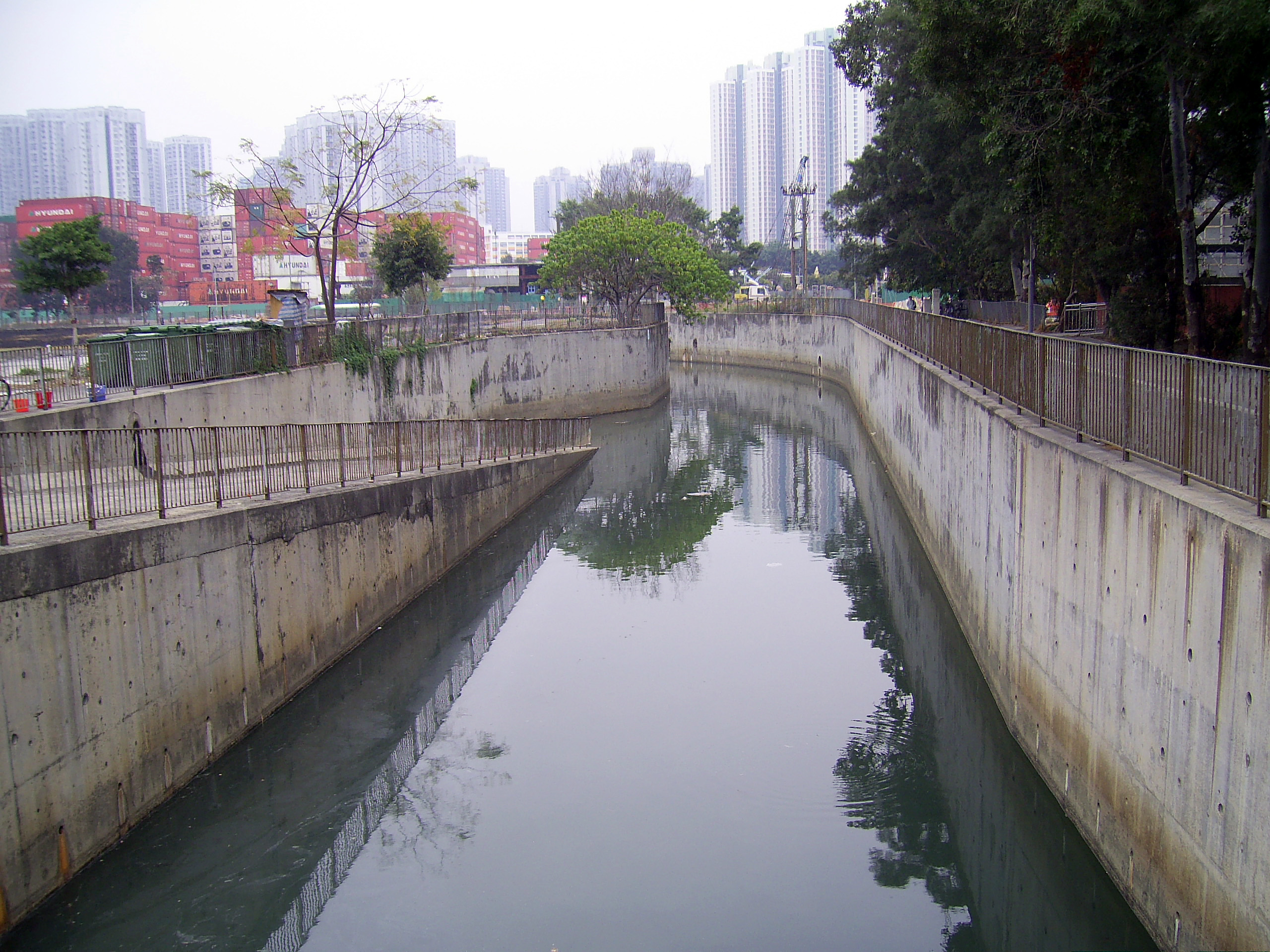
Ha Tsuen Nullah.

Ha Tsuen (Chinese: 厦村), or Ha Tsuen Heung (厦村鄉) is an area at the west of Yuen Long Town in Hong Kong. Administratively, it belongs to Yuen Long District.

== History ==
During the Hongwu era (1368-1398) of the Ming Dynasty, two members of the Tang clan in Kam Tin left for Ha Tsuen as they saw the potential of this place as a market and area for producing fish and salt. These two members of the Tang clan, Tang Hung-wai and Tang Hung-chi, built the two villages of Tseung Kong Wai (祥降圍, formerly Sai Tau Lei) and Tung Tau Tsuen (東頭村, formerly Tung Tau Lei).

As the Tang clan grew, additional villages were established. These included Tung Tau Tsuen, Hong Mei Tsuen, Lo Uk Tsuen, Tseung Kong Wai, San Wai, Sik Kong Tsuen and Sik Kong Wai.

The Tang Ancestral Hall (鄧氏宗祠), also known as Yau Kung Tong (友恭堂), was constructed by the Tang Clan of Ha Tsuen to commemorate their two founding ancestors, for establishing the village settlements in Ha Tsuen. Construction of the Ancestral Hall began in 1749 and was completed the following year, it has since become a declared monument of Hong Kong.

Ha Tsuen was once an important port and market because of the water-based transport system. There are rivers that flow into Deep Bay; in the past, boats from Canton and other areas in the Pearl River Delta could reach Ha Tsuen.

== Villages ==
Ha Tsuen Heung is mainly composed of 16 villages:

- Fung Kong Tsuen (鳳降村)
- Ha Pak Nai Tsuen (下白泥村)
- Ha Tsuen Shi (厦村市)
- Hong Mei Tsuen (巷尾村) (東頭三村)
- Lee Uk Tsuen (李屋村)
- Lo Uk Tsuen (羅屋村) (東頭三村)
- Pak Nai Tsuen (白泥村)
- San Sang Tsuen (新生村) (西山村)
- San Uk Tsuen (新屋村)
- San Wai (新圍) (新慶圍) (*)
- Sha Chau Lei (沙洲里) (白沙仔)
- Sik Kong Tsuen (錫降村)
- Sik Kong Wai (錫降圍) (*)
- Tin Sum Tsuen (田心村) (*)
- Tseung Kong Wai (祥降圍) (*)
- Tung Tau Tsuen (東頭村) (東頭三村)

(*) Indicates walled villages of Hong Kong

== Education ==
Ha Tsuen is in Primary One Admission (POA) School Net 72. Within the school net are multiple aided schools (operated independently but funded with government money) and one government school: Tin Shui Wai Government Primary School (天水圍官立小學).

== See also ==
- Ling To Monastery
- Mong Tseng Wai
- Sha Kong Wai
- Tsz Tin Tsuen
