= Yuen Kong San Tsuen =

Coordinates: 22.420714°N 114.074709°E

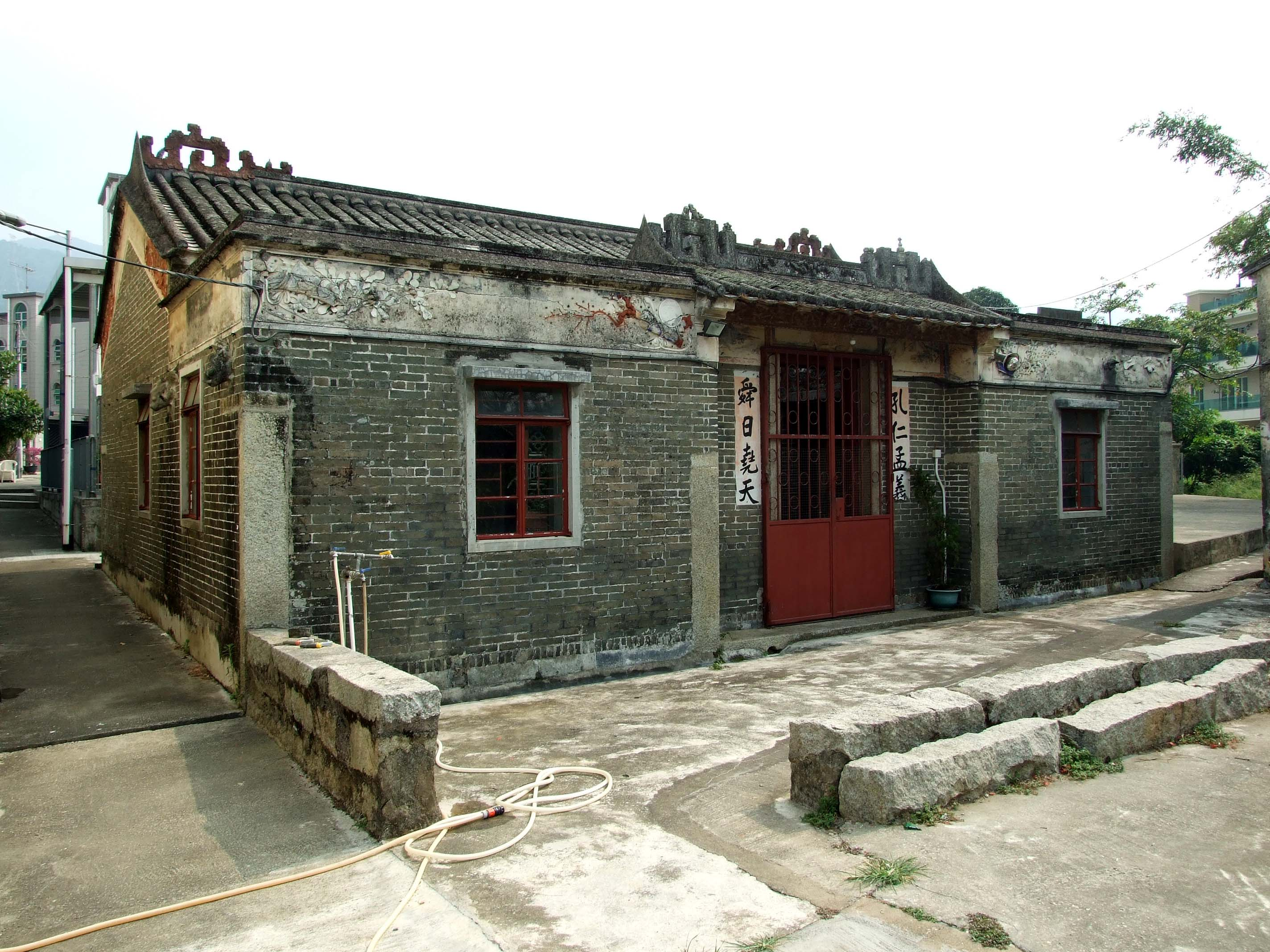
Yeung Ancestral Hall in Yuen Kong San Tsuen.

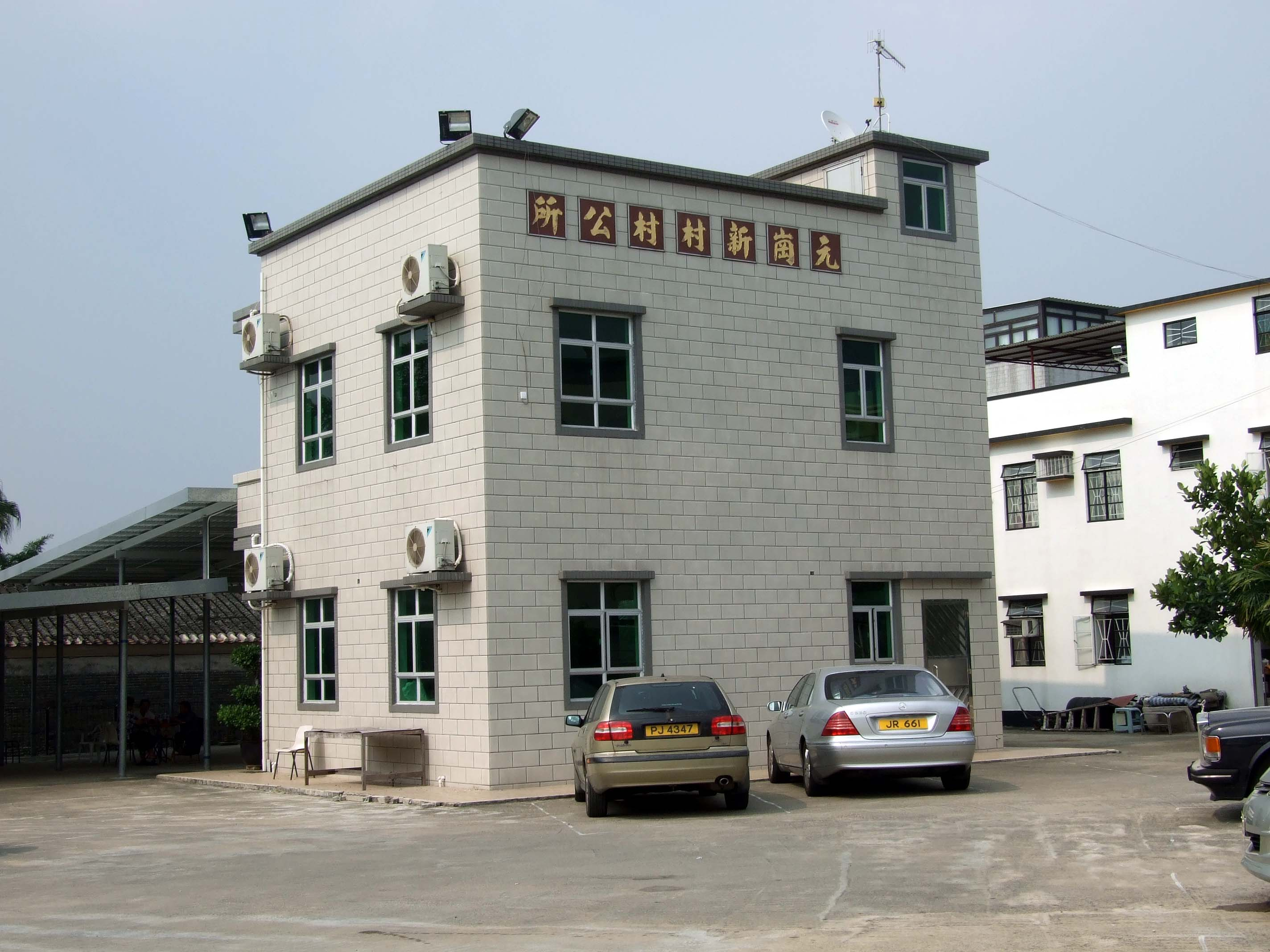
Yuen Kong San Tsuen Village Office

Yuen Kong San Tsuen (Chinese: 元崗新村; lit. 'Yuen Kong New Village') is a village in the southern end of Pat Heung, Yuen Long District, Hong Kong.

== Administration ==
Yuen Kong San Tsuen is a recognized village under the New Territories Small House Policy.

== History ==
The village was developed about one hundred years from Yuen Kong Tsuen in its north, following disputes among clansmen. Both villages are now separated by Kam Sheung Road.
