= Niiya =

Niiya (written: 新谷) may refer to:

- Hitomi Niiya (新谷 仁美) (born 1988), Japanese long-distance runner
- Niiya Station (新谷駅, Niiya-eki), train station in Ehime Prefecture, Japan
- Niiya (company), established in 1684
