= Yuen Kong Tsuen =

Coordinates: 22.425233°N 114.076749°E

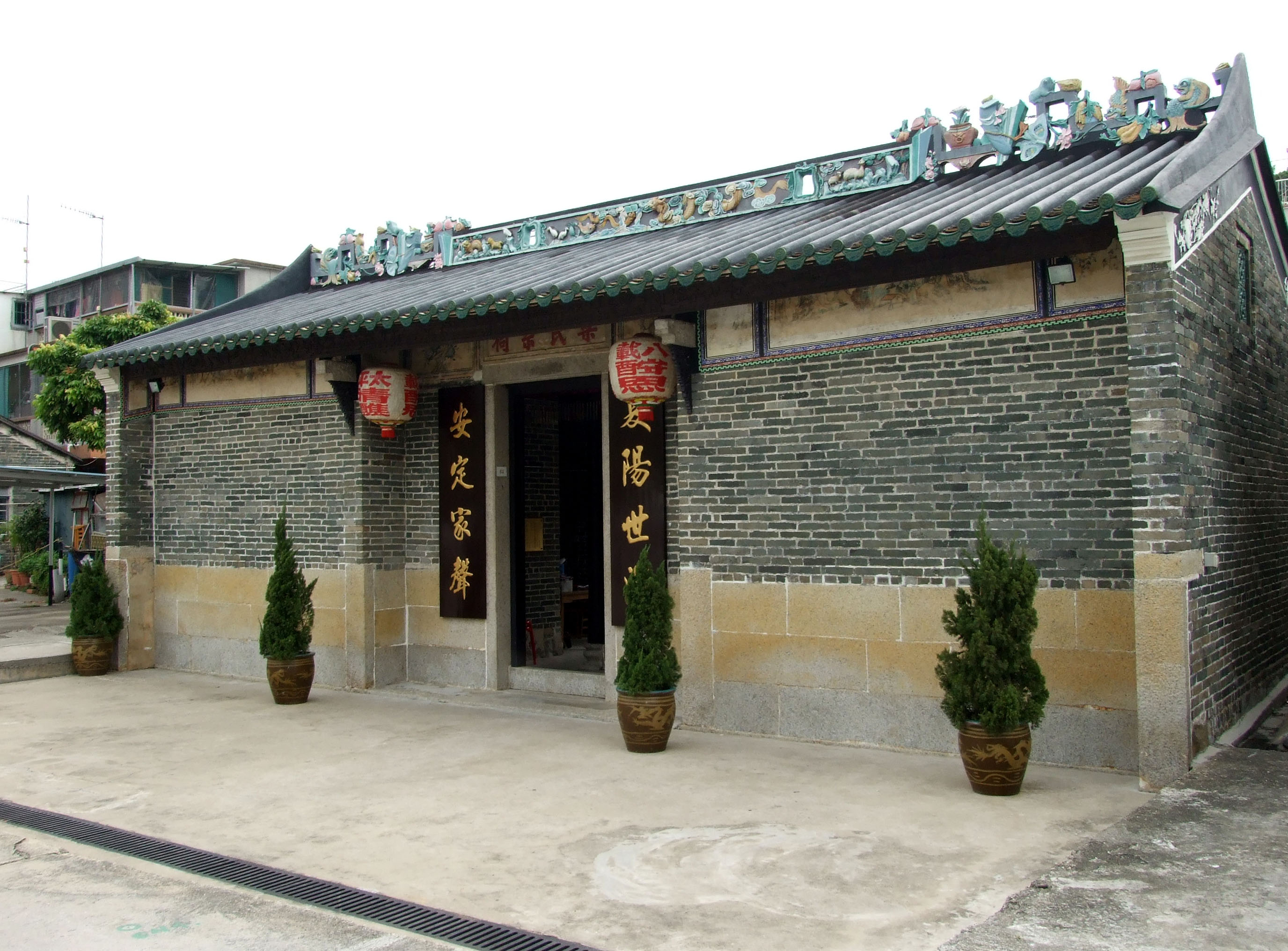
Leung Ancestral Hall in Yuen Kong Tsuen.

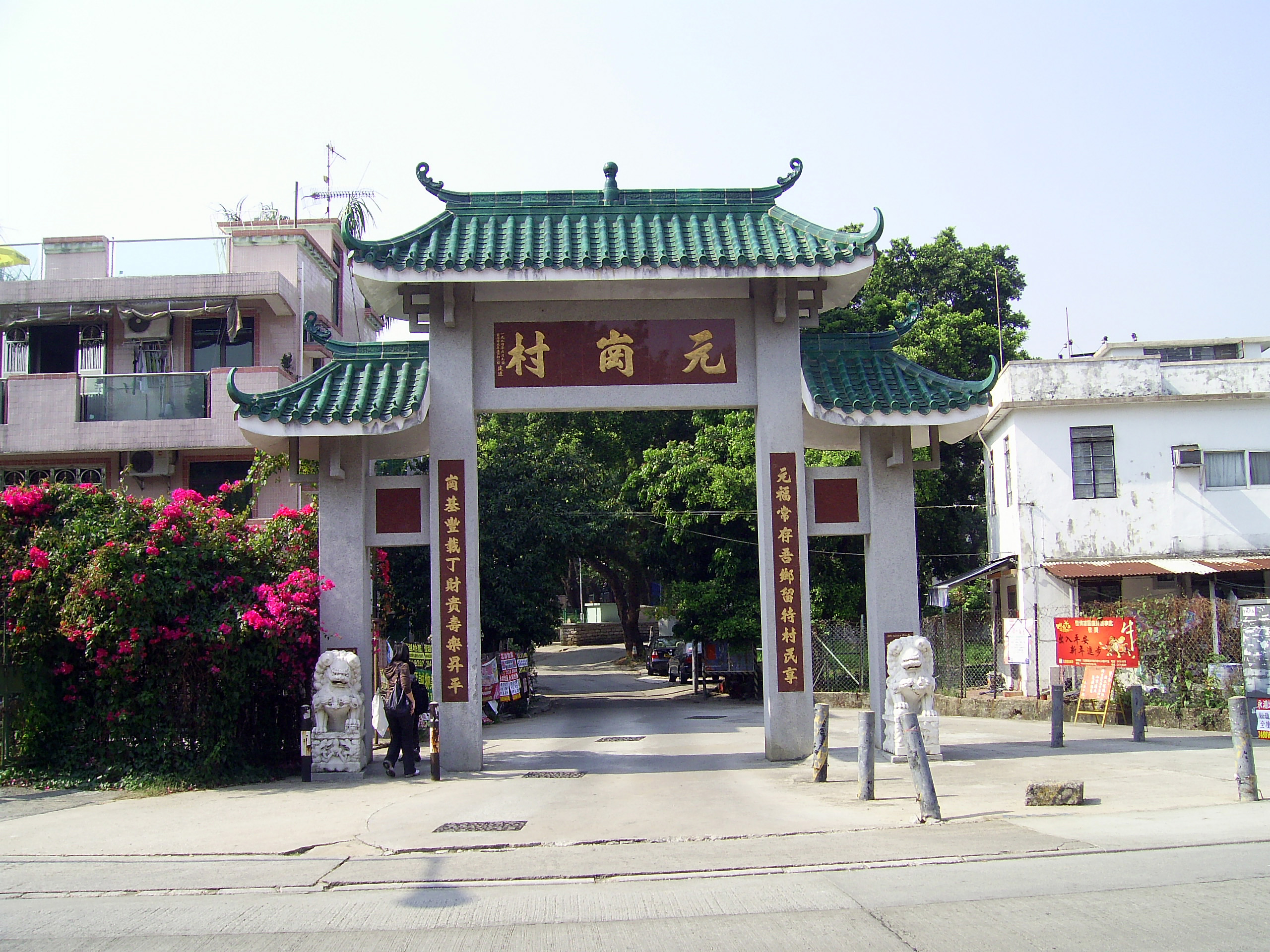
Paifang of Yuen Kong Tsuen

Yuen Kong Tsuen (Chinese: 元崗村) is a village in Pat Heung, Yuen Long District, Hong Kong.

== Administration ==
Yuen Kong is a recognized village under the New Territories Small House Policy.

== See also ==
- Yuen Kong San Tsuen
