= Hau Wong =

Chinese title

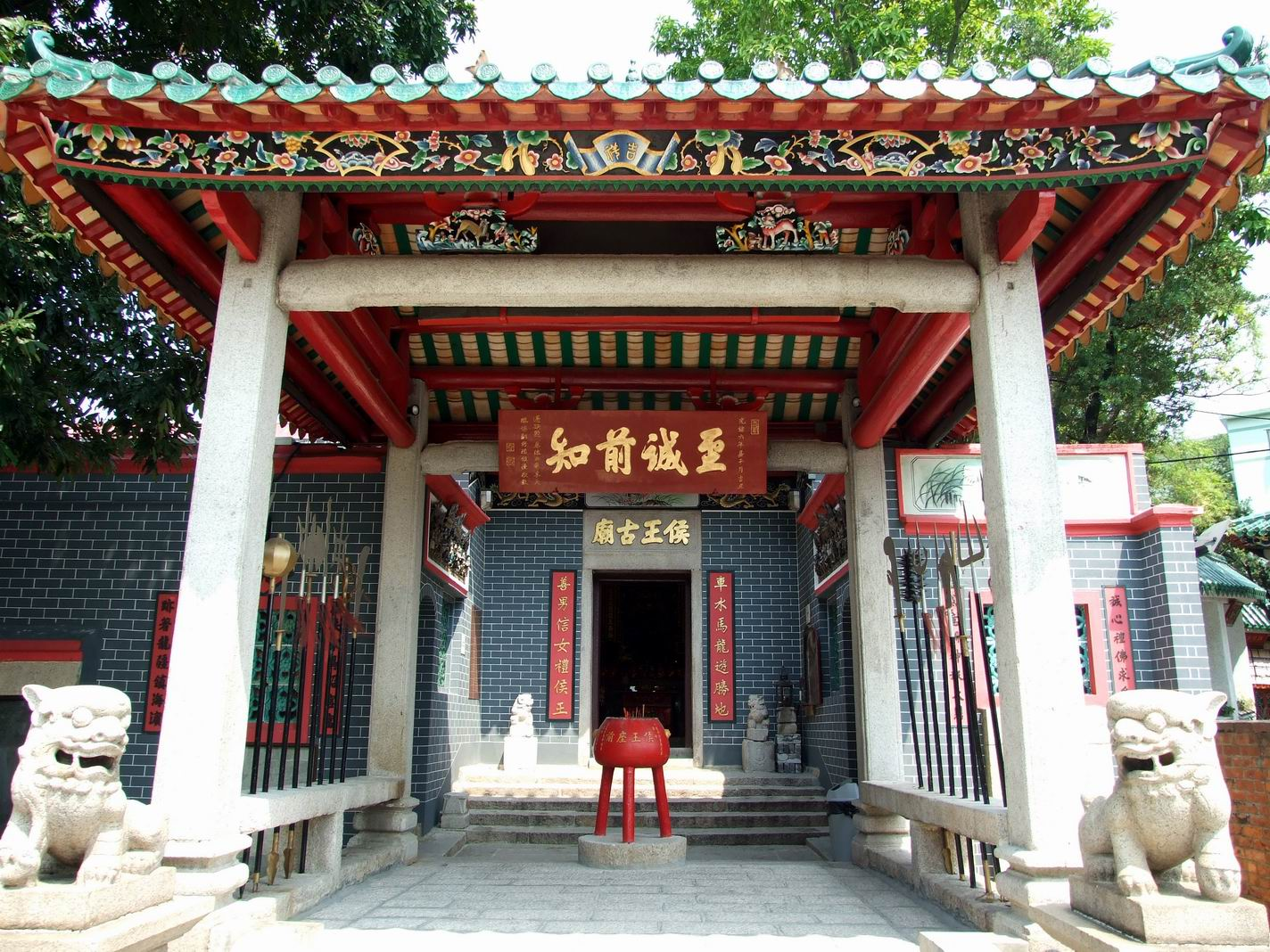
Hau Wong Temple at Junction Road, Hong Kong

Hau Wong or Hou Wang (Chinese: 侯王; Jyutping: hau4 wong4; pinyin: Hóu Wáng) is a title that can be translated as "Prince Marquis" or "Holy Marquis". It is not any one person's name. Hau Wong refers usually to Yeung Leung-jit (楊亮節; 杨亮节; joeng4 loeng6 zit3; Yáng Liàngjiē), also referred to as Yeung Hau (楊王; 'Marquis Yeung'). While in failing health he remained in the army to protect the last emperor of the Southern Song dynasty when he went with to take refuge in Kowloon.

== Temples in Hong Kong ==
There are several temples dedicated to Hau Wong in Hong Kong, including six temples in Yuen Long. The table provides a partial list of these temples.

Note 1: A territory-wide grade reassessment of historic buildings is ongoing. The grades listed in the table are based on these updates (8 June 2023). The temples with a "Not listed" status in the table below are not graded and do not appear in the list of historic buildings considered for grading.
Note 2: While most probably incomplete, this list is tentatively exhaustive.

=== Islands District ===
Location	Notes	Status	References	Photographs
Tai O, Lantau Island 22.259088°N 113.86275°E	Yeung Hau Temple (大澳楊侯古廟) Built in 1699. Managed by the Chinese Temples Committee. Pictures of Hau Wong Festival:	Declared (2017)		
Shek Pik, Lantau Island	Inundated by the Shek Pik Reservoir in 1960.	Non extant		
Sha Tsui Tau (沙咀頭), Tung Chung, Lantau Island 22.280283°N 113.931228°E	Hau Wong Temple, Tung Chung (東涌侯王古廟) Built in 1765, it is the largest Hau Wong temple in Lantau island.	Grade II		

=== Sha Tin District ===
Location	Notes	Status	References	Photographs
Tai Wai Village, Tai Wai, Sha Tin District 22.376043°N 114.178108°E	Hau Wong Temple, Tai Wai (大圍侯王宮) Built in 1983. It replaced an earlier temple, probably built in 1884 and demolished in 1982. Pictures of Hau Wong Festival:	Not listed		

=== Tsuen Wan District ===
Location	Notes	Status	References	Photographs
Top floor, 75 Ham Tin Street, Shek Pik New Village, Tsuen Wan 22.368131°N 114.117094°E	Hung Hau Temple (洪侯古廟) At the time of the construction of the Shek Pik Reservoir on Lantau Island, in the late 1950s, most of the villagers of Shek Pik Village moved into five-storey apartment blocks in the urban Shek Pik New Village (石碧新村) in Tsuen Wan. The two temples, Hau Wong Temple and Hung Shing Temple, were combined into the current Hung Hau Temple.	Not listed		

=== Tuen Mun District ===
Location	Notes	Status	References	Photographs
Ng Lau Road (五柳路), Tuen Tsz Wai, Lam Tei, Tuen Mun District 22.420324°N 113.979252°E	Sam Shing Temple (三聖宮) Dedicated to the Marshal Yuen Tan Fuk Fu (玄壇伏虎元帥; 'Tiger Suppressing General'), Hung Shing and Hau Wong. It was rebuilt in 1993.	Nil grade		

=== Wong Tai Sin District ===
Location	Notes	Status	References	Photographs
Kowloon City area, at the southwestern corner of Wong Tai Sin District. Corner of Tung Tau Tsuen Road and Junction Road, opposite Kowloon Walled City Park. 22.332783°N 114.187464°E	Hau Wong Temple, Junction Road (九龍城侯王廟) Built around 1730. Historic characters in the temple are said to have been worked on by Chang Yu-tang, Commodore of Dapeng, general of Kowloon Walled City. It is believed that Emperor Bing and his brother Emperor Duanzong made their last stance in the Song dynasty. Managed by the Chinese Temples Committee.	Declared (Previously Grade I)		

=== Yuen Long District ===
Location	Notes	Status	References	Photographs
Hang Tau Tsuen, next to Sheung Cheung Wai, Ping Shan, Yuen Long District 22.446447°N 114.0077°E	Yeung Hau Temple, Ping Shan (屏山楊侯古廟) Partly dedicated to Hau Wong. The temple is part of the Ping Shan Heritage Trail.	Grade III		
Tong Yan San Tsuen (唐人新村), Ping Shan, Yuen Long District 22.433877°N 114.012505°E	Yeung Hau Temple, Tong Yan San Tsuen (唐人新村楊侯古廟). The temple is also known as Yee Ling Temple and Za Ling Temple Situated to the east of Tong Yan San Tsuen near Sha Tseng Road (沙井路), it was built in 1711.	Grade III		
Tung Tau Tsuen (東頭村), Ha Tsuen, Yuen Long District 22.453628°N 113.993086°E	Yeung Hau Temple, Ha Tsuen (廈村楊侯宮) also known as Tung Tau Miu (東頭廟; 'eastern temple')	Declared		
San Wai (新圍), Ha Tsuen, Yuen Long District 22.452783°N 113.989659°E	Yeung Hau Temple (楊侯古廟), also called the Sai Tau Miu (西頭廟; 'the western temple') It was renovated in 1901. It serves as the social venue which plays the dual roles as a temple and an ancestral hall of San Wai. Basin meal feasts are organized in front of the Temple during Yeung Hau Festival and Lunar New Year.	Nil grade		
Sik Kong Wai (錫降圍), Ha Tsuen, Yuen Long District 22.449026°N 113.992141°E	Yeung Hau Temple (楊侯宮) Shrine of a walled village. Situated at the end of the central axis of Sik Kong Wai, a walled village of the Tang Clan in Ha Tsuen, with its name recorded in the Xin'an Gazetteer of 1820.	Nil grade		
No. 26C Cheung Shing Street, Yuen Long Kau Hui, Yuen Long 22.447341°N 114.032422°E	Tai Wong Temple, Yuen Long Kau Hui (元朗舊墟大王廟) It was probably built between 1662 and 1722. It is the main temple of Nam Pin Wai as well as Yuen Long Kau Hui. It was built for the worship of Hung Shing and Yeung Hau. Other than for worship, the temple was a venue for solving disputes and discussing market affairs among the villagers. It also once served as a yamen and the officials lived there.	Grade I		
Wong Uk Tsuen, Yuen Long District 22.448398°N 114.037999°E	Yi Shing Temple (二聖宮), conventionally called Tai Wong Temple It is mainly for the worship of Hung Shing and Yeung Hau deities. Renovation was carried out in 1924. It still acts as an alliance temple of the Tung Tau Alliance (東頭約) formed by the seven villages next to Yuen Long Kau Hui. In the old days, the temple operated a credit society serving the alliance villages.	Nil grade		
Yuen Kong Tsuen (元崗村), Pat Heung, Yuen Long District 22.425563°N 114.077705°E	Chung Shing Temple (眾聖宮, Temple of All Saints) The main deity of the temple is Pak Tai with some others including Hau Wong and the Earth God.	Grade III		

== Temples outside of Hong Kong ==
Location	Notes	Status	References	Photographs
Herberton Road in Atherton, Queensland, Australia 17.278839°S 145.471842°E	The Hou Wang Temple is dedicated to bodyguard commander Yang Liang Chieh in 1280 AD, who was responsible for the life of the 8 year old Emperor Bing of Song losing to the Mongols in the falling Song dynasty	Queensland Heritage Register		
Bocas Town, Bocas del Toro Province, Panama 9.338852°N 82.239754°W	The How Fang Temple arrived to Bocas Town in 1904, coming from Kowloon.			

== See also ==
- Sung Wong Toi
- Places of worship in Hong Kong
