= Shinya Sato =

Shinya Sato may refer to:

- Shinya Sato (footballer) (佐藤 真也, born 1978), Japanese footballer
- Shin'ya Satō (shogi) (佐藤 紳哉, born 1977), Japanese shogi player
