= Tseung Kong Wai =

Walled village in Hong Kong

Tseung Kong Wai Chinese: 祥降圍
- Village
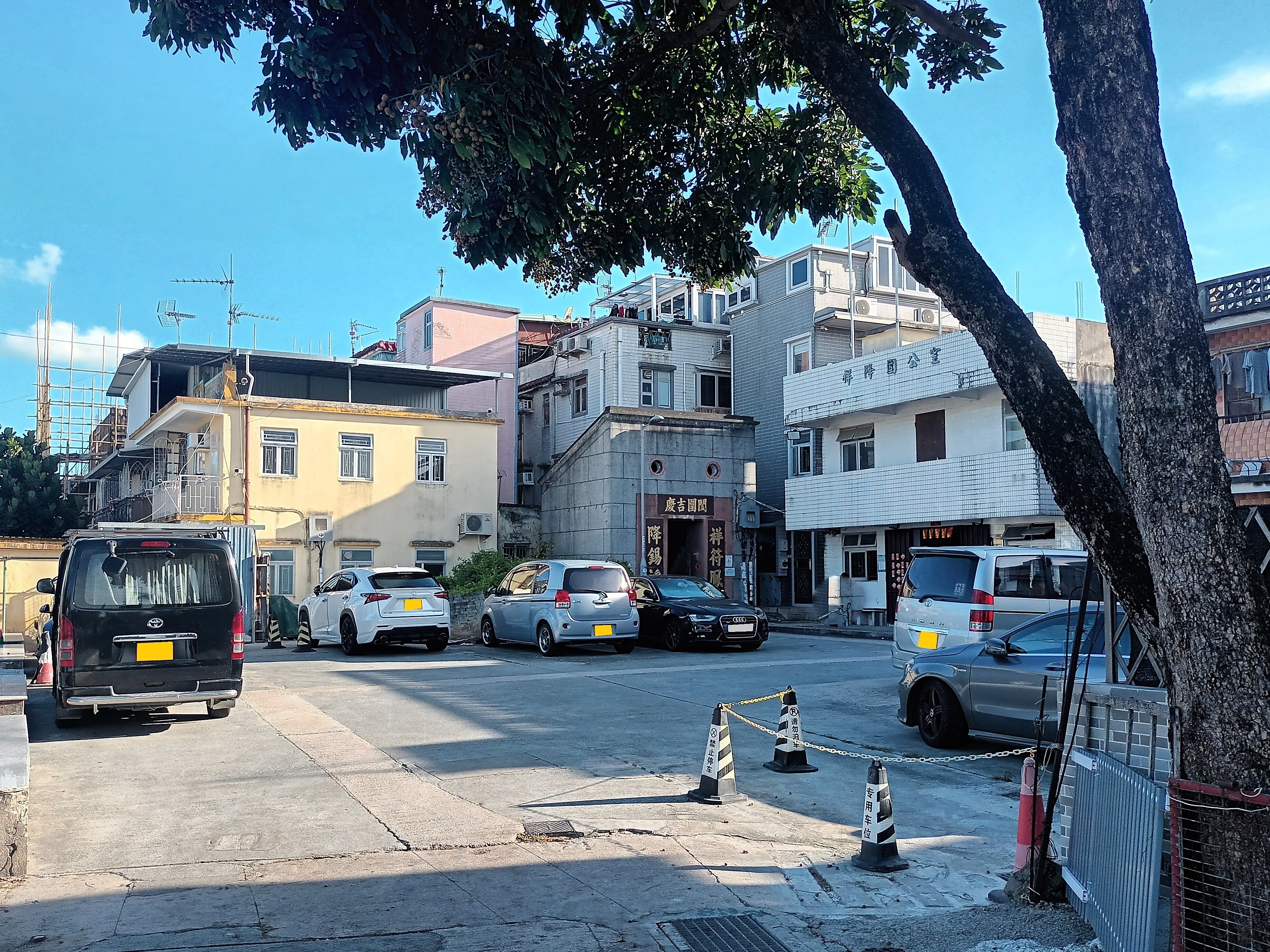
- Tseung Kong Wai.

- Location within Hong Kong
- Coordinates: 22.450331°N 113.987727°E
- Country: People's Republic of China
- Special administrative region: Hong Kong
- District: Yuen Long District
- Area: Ha Tsuen
- Time zone: UTC+8:00 (HKT)

Tseung Kong Wai (Chinese: 祥降圍) aka. Lo Wai (老圍), formerly Sai Tau Lei (西頭里), is a walled village in Ha Tsuen, Yuen Long District, Hong Kong.

== Administration ==
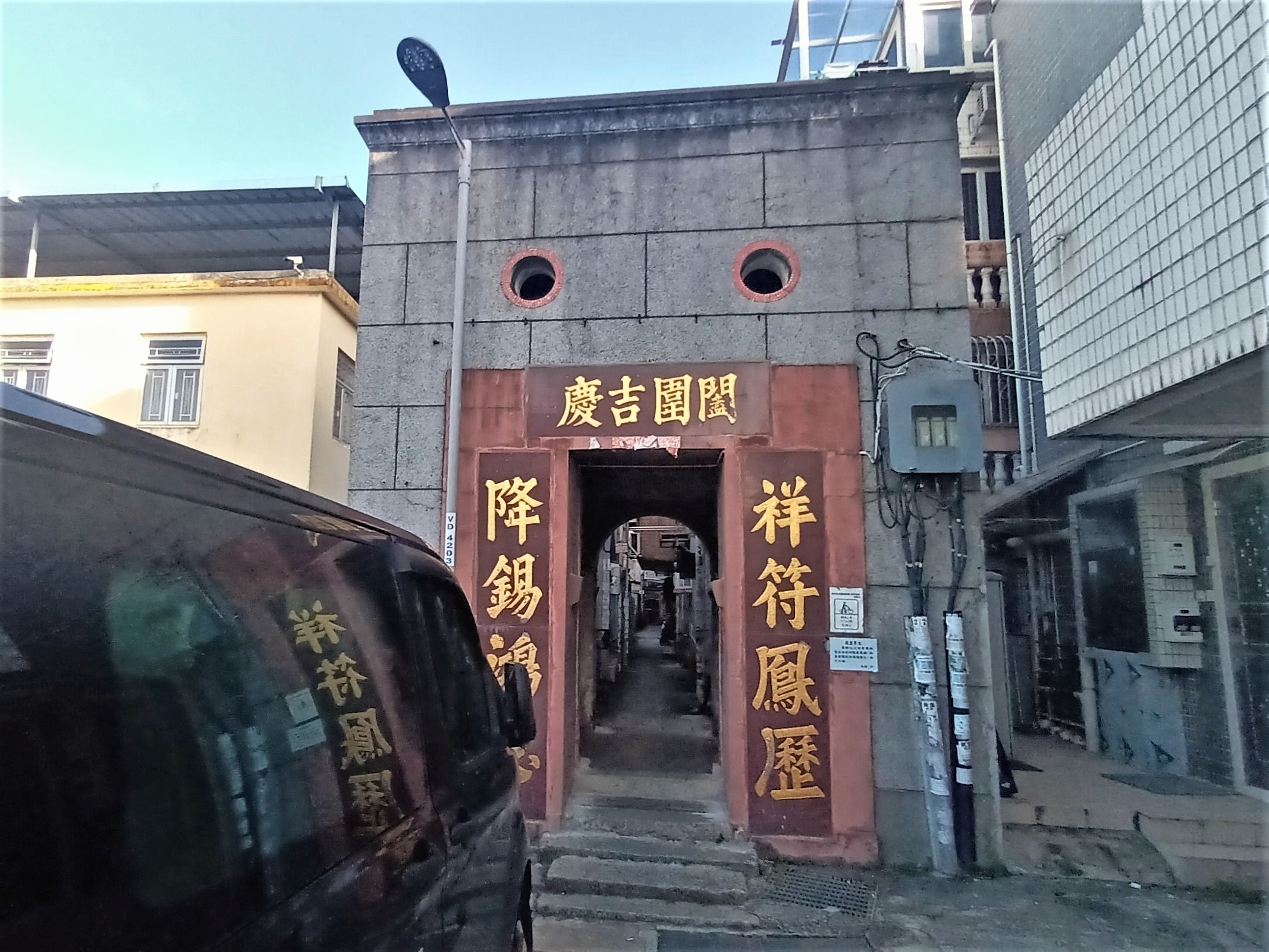
Entrance gate of Tseung Kong Wai.

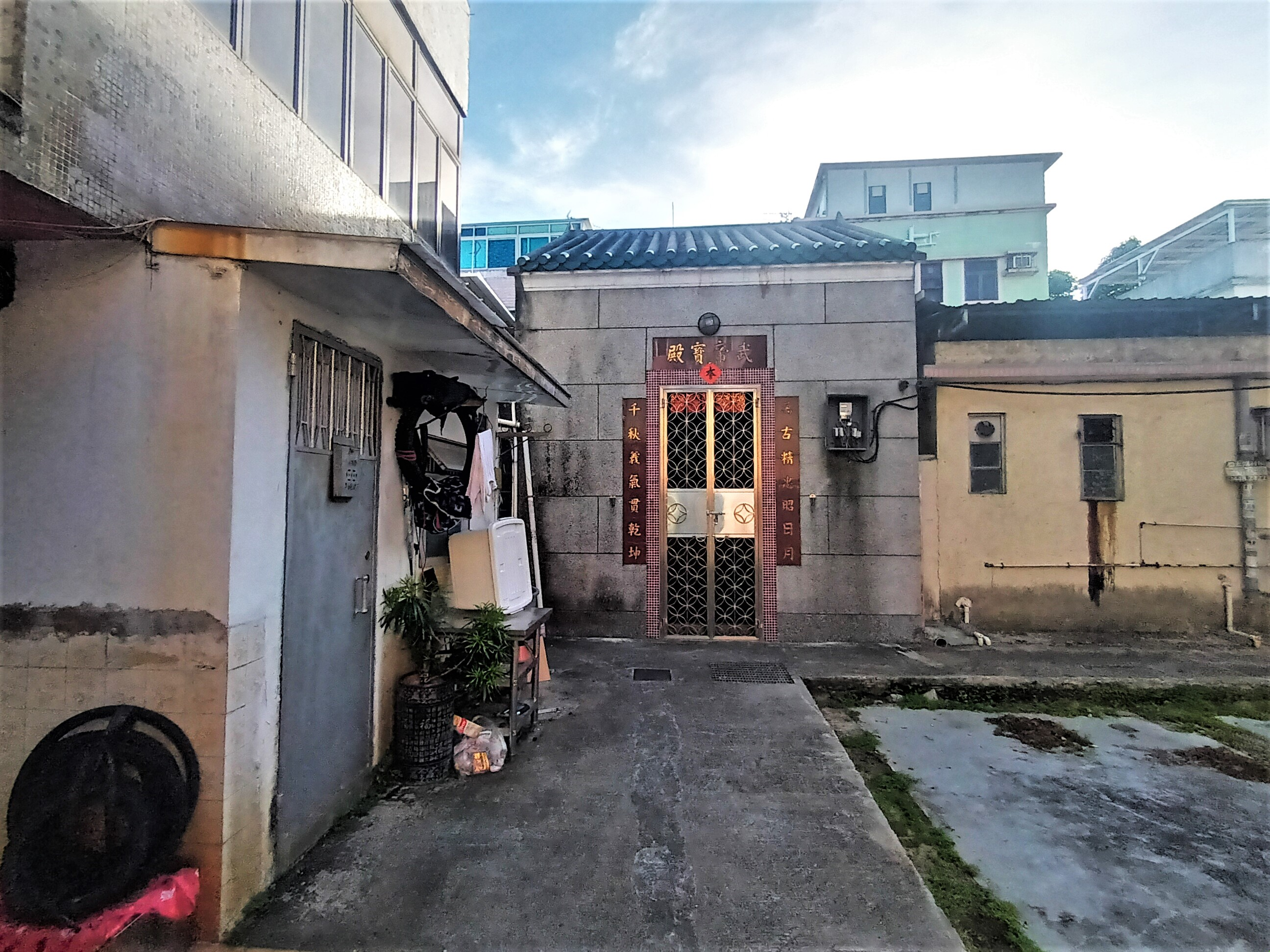
Mo Tai Temple (武帝寶殿) in Tseung Kong Wai.

Tseung Kong Wai is a recognized village under the New Territories Small House Policy.

== History ==
During the Hungwu reign of the Ming Dynasty, two members of the Tang clans in Kam Tin left for Ha Tsuen as they saw the potentials of this place as markets and places of producing fish and salt. These two members of Tang clans, Tang Hung Wai and Tang Hung Chih, built two villages there. The two villages are Tseung Kong Wai (formerly Sai Tau Lei) and Tung Tau Tsuen (東頭村, formerly Tung Tau Lei).

== See also ==
- Walled villages of Hong Kong
