= Tung Tau Tsuen (Ha Tsuen) =

Village of Hong Kong

Tung Tau Tsuen Chinese: 東頭村
- Village
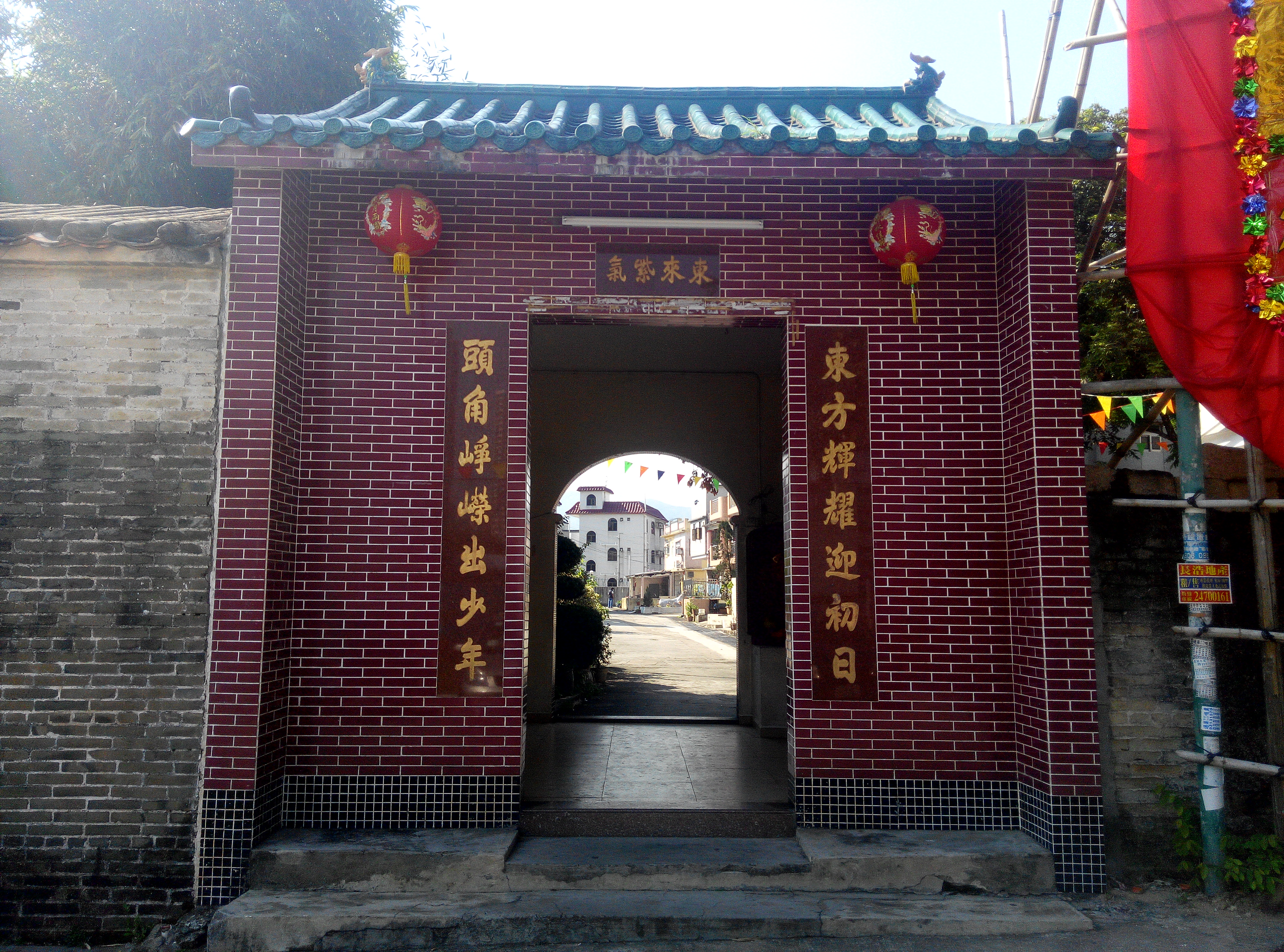
- Entrance gate of Tung Tau Tsuen in December 2014.

- Location within Hong Kong
- Coordinates: 22.452966°N 113.992720°E
- Country: People's Republic of China
- Special administrative region: Hong Kong
- District: Yuen Long District
- Area: Ha Tsuen
- Time zone: UTC+8:00 (HKT)

Tung Tau Tsuen (Chinese: 東頭村), formerly Tung Tau Lei, is a village in Ha Tsuen, Yuen Long District, Hong Kong.

== Administration ==
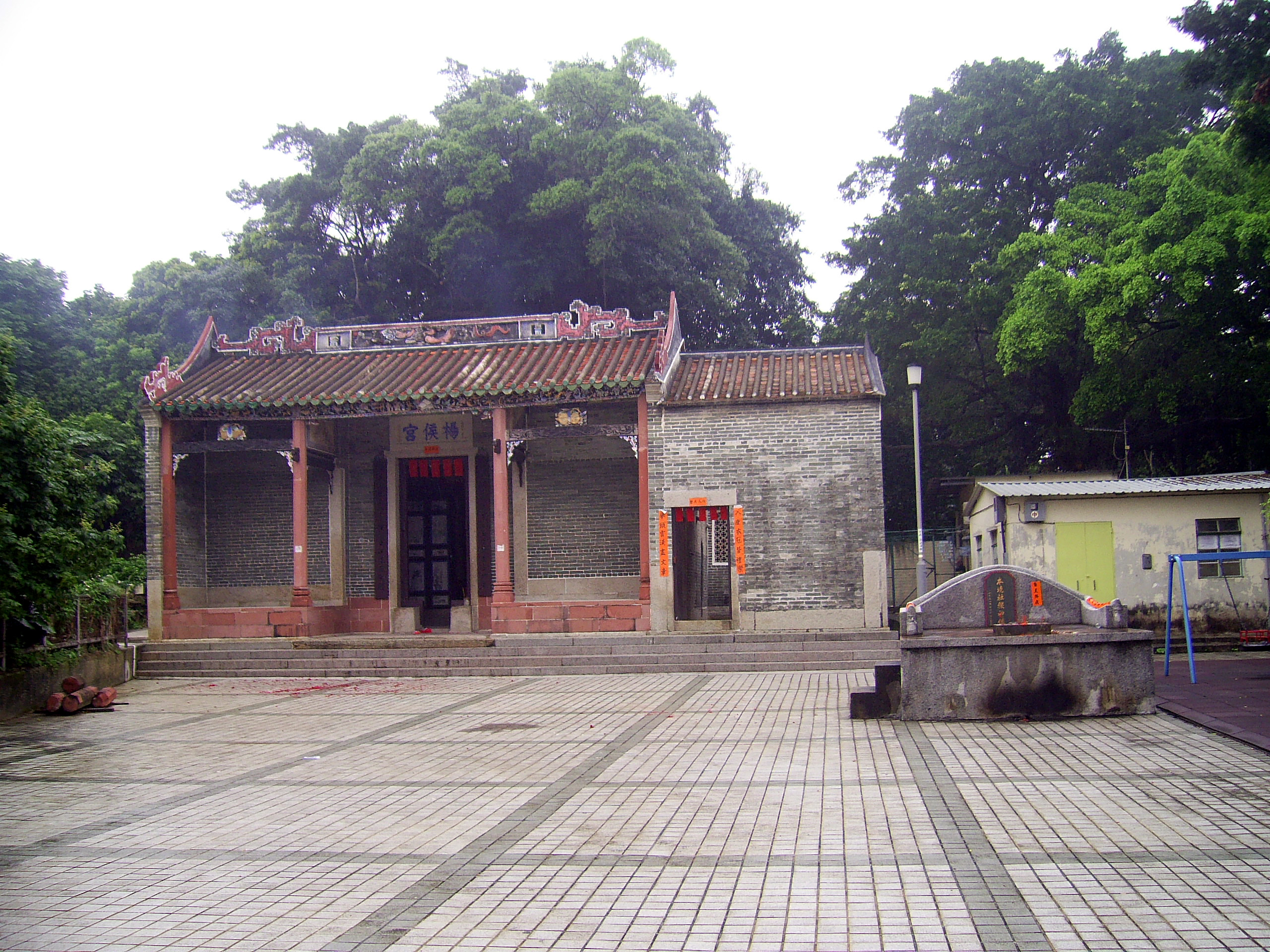
Yeung Hau Temple in Tung Tau Tsuen in February 2010.

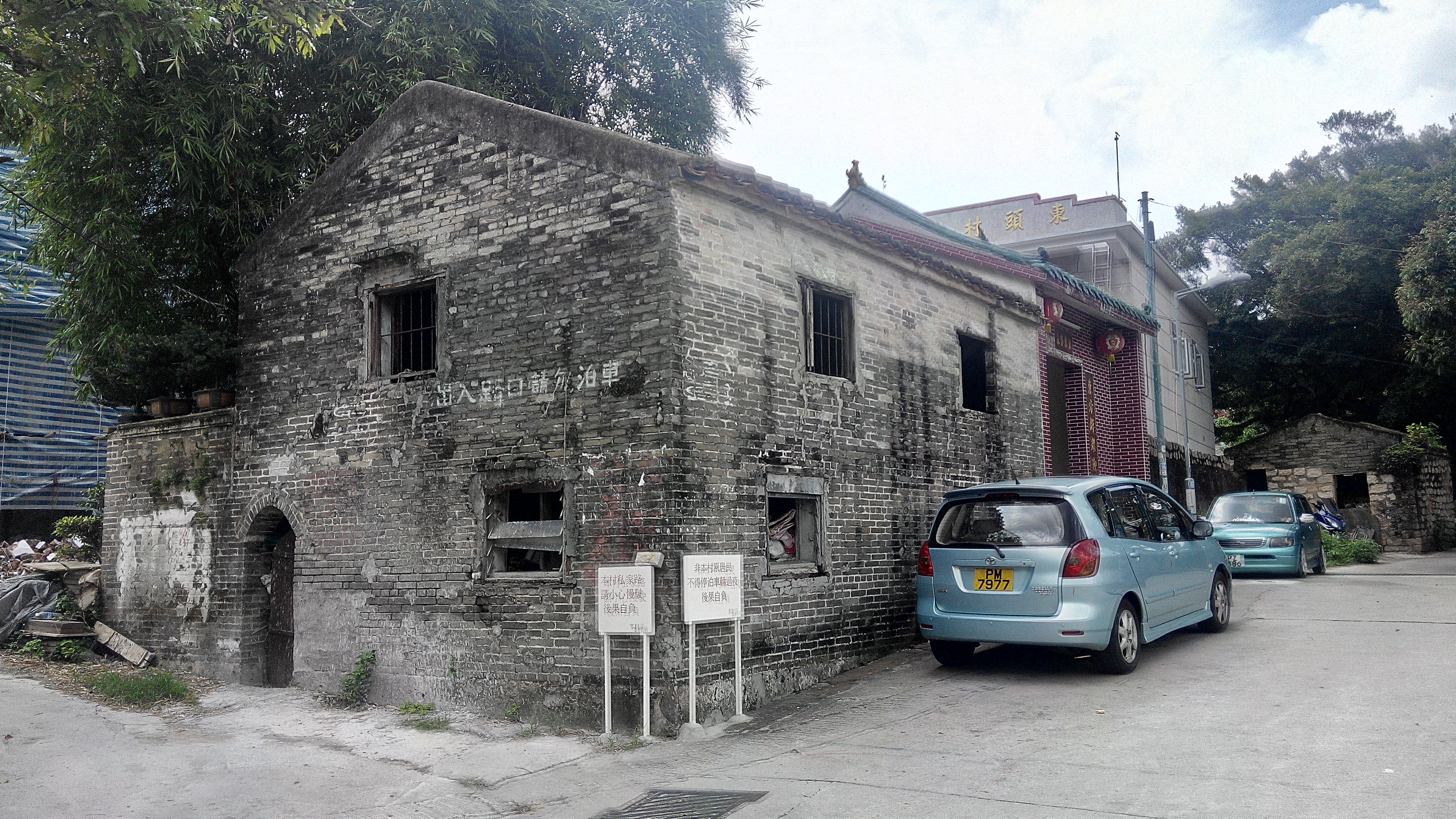
Old Village School in Tung Tau Tsuen.

Tung Tau Tsuen is a recognized village under the New Territories Small House Policy.

== History ==
During the Hungwu reign of the Ming Dynasty, two members of Tang clans in Kam Tin left for Ha Tsuen as they saw the potentials of this place as markets and places of producing fish and salt. These two members of Tang clans, Tang Hung Wai and Tang Hung Chih, built two villages there. The two villages are Tseung Kong Wai (祥降圍, formerly Sai Tau Lei) and Tung Tau Tsuen (formerly Tung Tau Lei).

== Features ==
The Yeung Hau Temple in Ha Tsuen (廈村楊侯宮) also known as Tung Tau Miu (東頭廟; 'eastern temple'), is located in Tung Tau Tsuen. It was built before 1871. It is believed to have been built by the local Tang clan of Tung Tau Sam Tsuen (東頭三村; 'three villages in the east'), comprising Tung Tau Tsuen, Lo Uk Tsuen and Hong Mei Tsuen. It was declared a monument in 1988.
