= San Uk Tsuen (Yuen Long District) =

Coordinates: 22.445373°N 113.991962°E

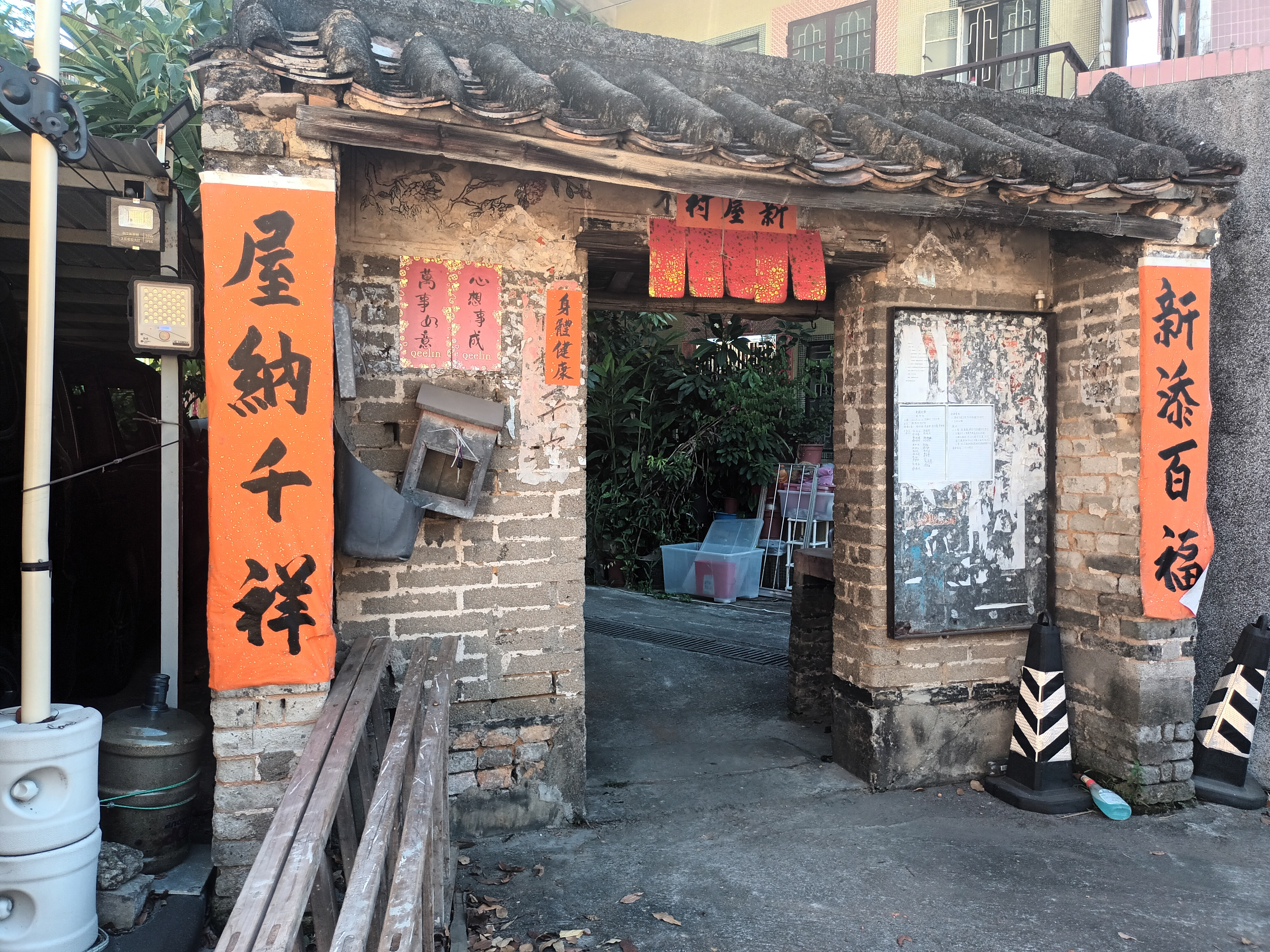
Entrance gate of San Uk Tsuen.

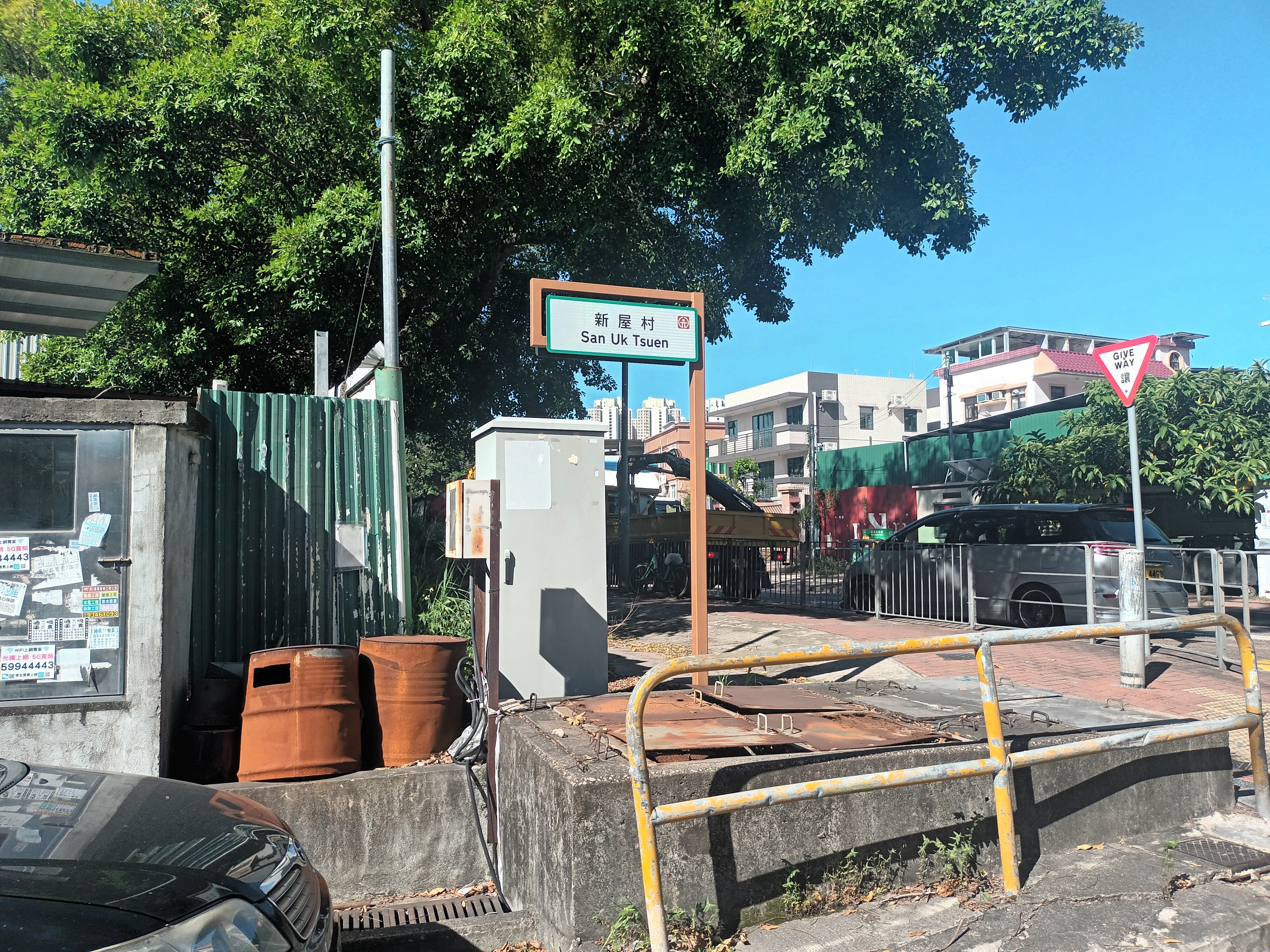
Tin Ha Road (田廈路) at San Uk Tsuen.

San Uk Tsuen (Chinese: 新屋村) is a village Ha Tsuen, Yuen Long District, Hong Kong.

== Administration ==
San Uk Tsuen is a recognized village under the New Territories Small House Policy.
