= Lo Uk Tsuen (Ha Tsuen) =

Coordinates: 22.451731°N 113.993579°E

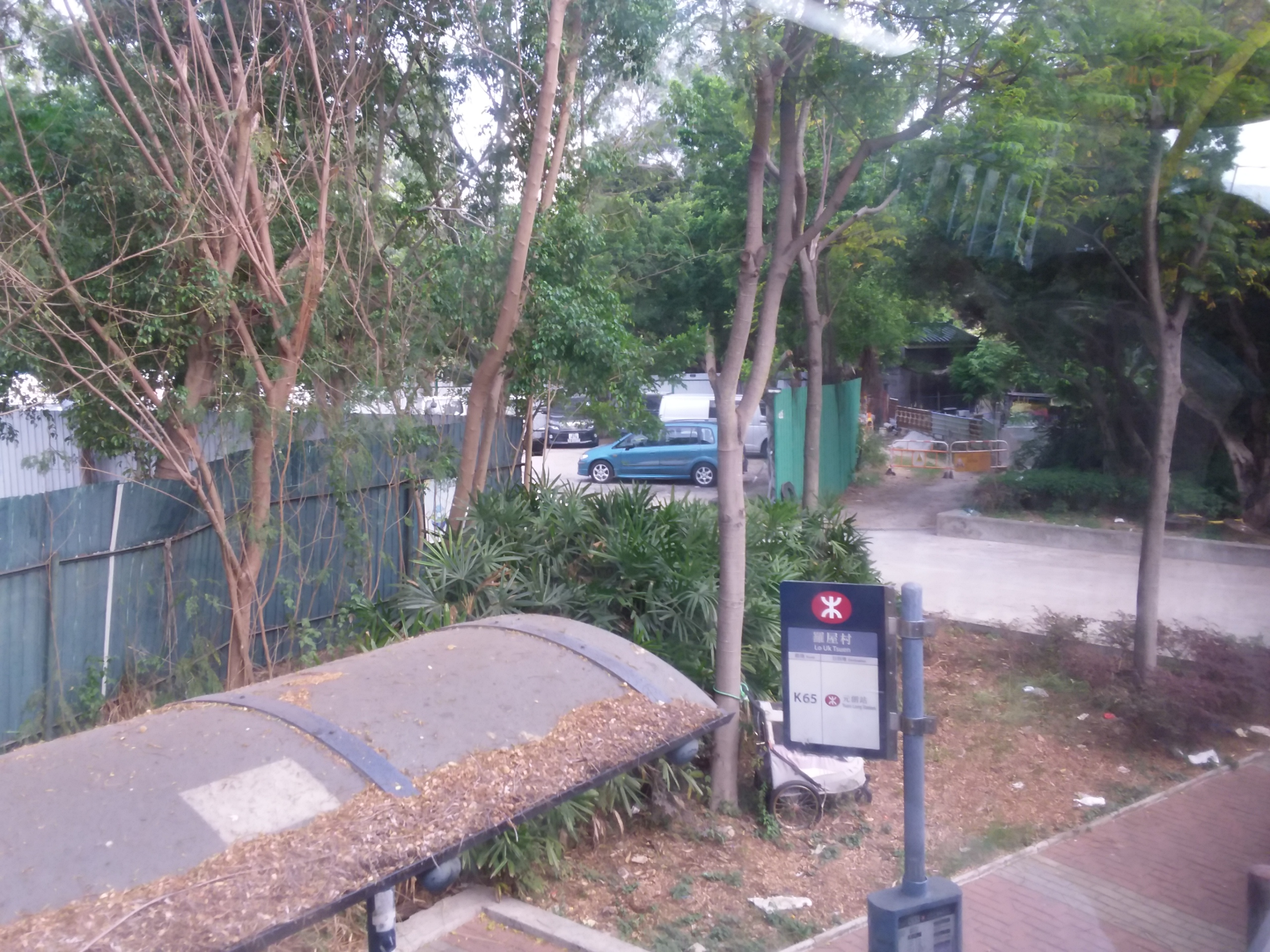
Lo Uk Tsuen bus stop along Ping Ha Road

Lo Uk Tsuen (Chinese: 羅屋村) is a village in Ha Tsuen, Yuen Long District, Hong Kong.

== Administration ==
Lo Uk Tsuen is a recognized village under the New Territories Small House Policy.

== Features ==
The Yeung Hau Temple in Ha Tsuen (廈村楊侯宮) also known as Tung Tau Miu (東頭廟; 'eastern temple'), and located in nearby Tung Tau Tsuen, was built before 1871. It is believed to have been built by the local Tang clan of Tung Tau Sam Tsuen (東頭三村; 'three villages in the east'), comprising Tung Tau Tsuen, Lo Uk Tsuen and Hong Mei Tsuen. It was declared a monument in 1988.
