= Hung Fuk =

Hong Kong constituency

- Elected constituency for the Yuen Long District Council
- Boundary of Hung Fuk in Yuen Long District
- District: Yuen Long
- Legislative Council constituency: New Territories North West
- Population: 12,641 (2019)
- Electorate: 4,852 (2019)

Current constituency
- Created: 2019
- Number of members: One
- Member: Vacant
- Created from: Ping Shan Central, Ping Shan South

Hung Fuk (Chinese: 洪福) is one of the 39 constituencies in the Yuen Long District.

Created for the 2019 District Council elections, the constituency returns one district councillor to the Yuen Long District Council, with an election every four years.

Hung Fuk loosely covers public housing estate Hung Fuk Estate in Hung Shui Kiu. It has projected population of 12,641.

== Councillors represented ==
Election	Member	Party
2019	Eddie Chan Shu-fai→Vacant	TCHDNTW→Nonpartisan

== Election results ==
=== 2010s ===
Yuen Long District Council Election, 2019: Hung Fuk
Party	Candidate	Votes	%	±%
PfD (Team Chu)	Eddie Chan Shu-fai	1,780	52.08	
DAB	Chui Kwan-siu	1,626	47.57	
Nonpartisan	Poon Sin-yan	12	0.35	
Majority		154	4.51	
Turnout		3,427	70.67	
PfD win (new seat)				
