= Hong Kong–Shenzhen Western Express Railway =

Hong Kong–Shenzhen Western Railway (Chinese: 港深西部鐵路) is a proposed cross-border railway connecting Hung Shui Kiu in northwestern Hong Kong to Qianhai in Shenzhen. It is expected to open in 2035 as the third cross-border railway in Hong Kong, after the Guangzhou–Kowloon through train and Guangzhou–Shenzhen–Hong Kong Express Rail Link.

== History ==
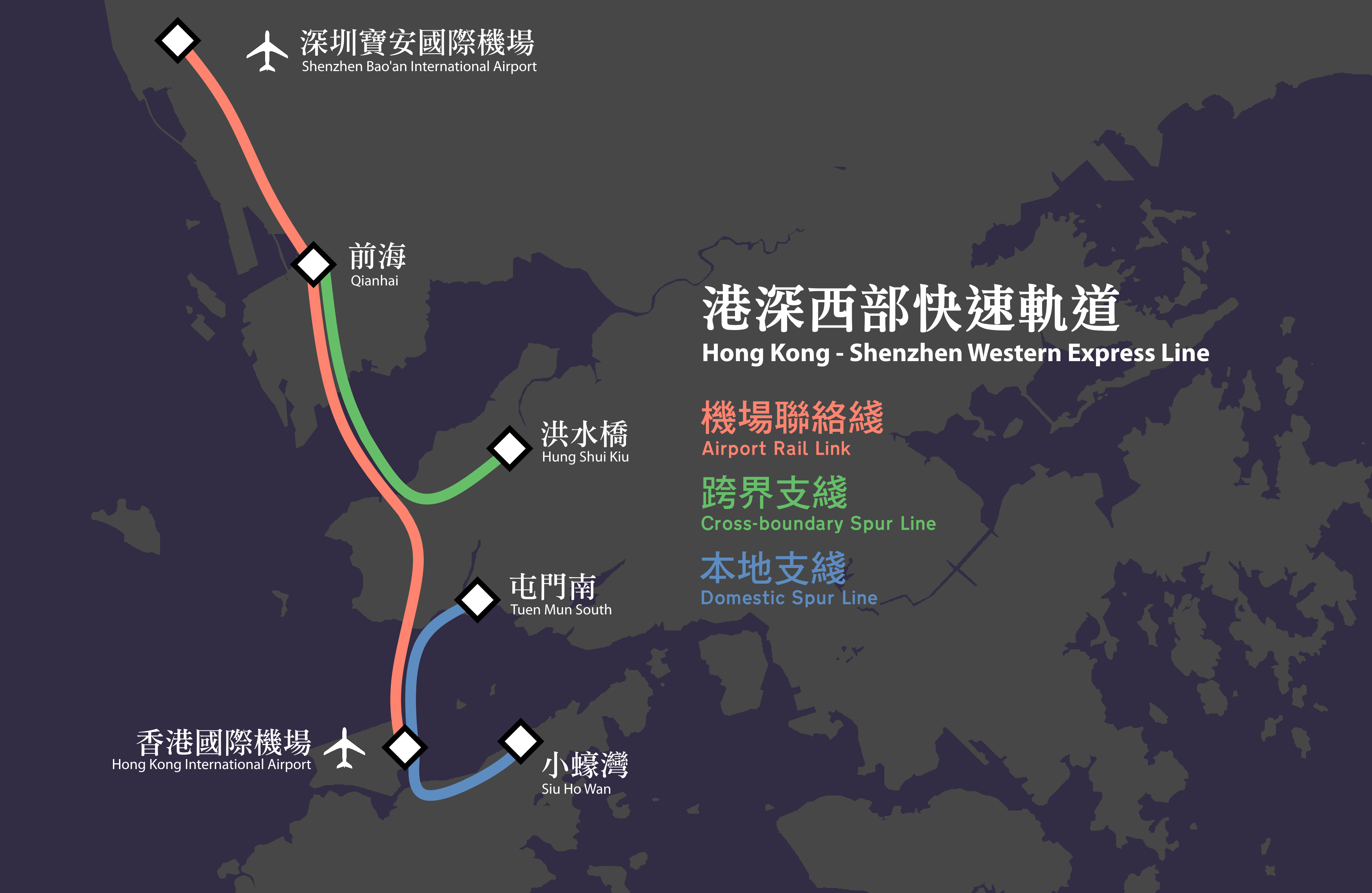
Railway plan according to 2012 study

In a 2000 Hong Kong governmental study, two separate rail links were proposed as the Deep Bay Link (后海灣線) and the Chek Lap Kok Link (赤鱲角線). It was envisaged that the Deep Bay Link could connect Nanshan, Shenzhen with the new developing areas in Hung Shui Kiu, possibly interchanging with West Rail line (now Tuen Ma line). The Chek Lap Kok Link would connect Hong Kong Airport and Lantau Island with Tuen Mun. However it was determined that the projects were not warranted at the development levels of the served areas at that time.

Shenzhen authorities also derived a similar railway project, initially named "Western Shenzhen–Hong Kong intercity railway" (Chinese: 西部深港城际线) as a branch of Guangzhou–Shenzhen intercity railway. The revised plan in 2007 described the railway running from Qianhaiwan station and branching at northwestern New Territories, separately linking the airport and the central business district in Central. In the same year Sir Donald Tsang, Hong Kong Chief Executive, also suggested linking the two airports with railway in the Policy Address "to fully complement each other" in addition to the existing high-speed ferry services ply, which was strongly supported by the Shenzhen Municipal Government.

In 2012, the government combined the projects and renamed it the "Hong Kong–Shenzhen Western Express Railway" (Chinese: 港深西部快速軌道), offering three future distinct services, direct connection between Hong Kong International Airport (HKIA) and Shenzhen Bao'an International Airport (as Airport Rail Link); cross-border spur line between Hung Shui Kiu and Qianhai; and domestic spur line between Tuen Mun and Siu Ho Wan.

In 2019, the Guangdong Provincial Government announced ongoing "collaboration with Hong Kong over Hong Kong–Shenzhen Western Express Railway". The conceptual intercity plan appeared in a 2020 official document of National Development and Reform Commission. Two years later the Hong Kong Government confirmed the active planning of the Hong Kong – Shenzhen Western Rail Link, running between Hung Shui Kiu and Qianhai, and announced the proposal of extending the railway to HKU station via Tuen Mun East, Sunny Bay, and Kau Yi Chau Artificial Islands. The proposal in 2021 Policy Address of the railway was to connect Hung Shui Kiu/Ha Tsuen and Qianhai of Shenzhen only.

== Alignment and stations ==
The Shenzhen section will be 10.8 km long and the Hong Kong section will be 7.3 km long. A depot would be built between Lau Fau Shan and Ha Tsuen. A juxtaposed border control, similar to Hong Kong West Kowloon station, would be placed in Shenzhen. The Hong Kong government plans to entrust the Shenzhen government for designing the tunnel sections in Hong Kong to ensure compatibility.

Name		Connections	Opening date	District
English	Chinese	Connections	Opening date	District
Hung Shui Kiu	洪水橋	Tuen Ma line	Expected 2035	Tuen Mun
Ha Tsuen	厦村	—	Expected 2035	Tuen Mun
Lau Fau Shan	流浮山	—	Expected 2035	Tuen Mun
↑ Hong Kong section / Shenzhen section ↓
Shenzhen Bay Checkpoint	深圳湾口岸	13	Expected 2035	Nanshan
Qianhaiwan	前海湾	1 5 11	Expected 2035	Nanshan
