= Hung Shui Hang Reservoir =

Irrigation reservoir in New Territories, Hong Kong

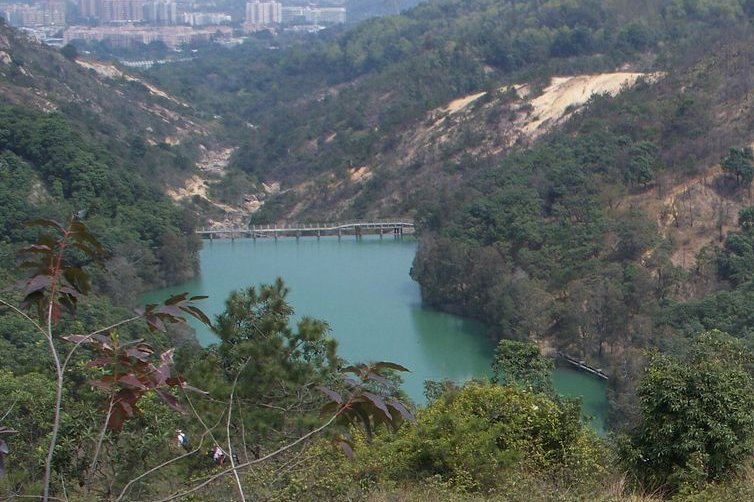
- Hung Shui Hang Reservoir

- Location within Hong Kong
- Location: New Territories, Hong Kong
- Coordinates: 22.412612°N 113.99589°E
- Type: reservoir

Hung Shui Hang Reservoir
- Traditional Chinese: 洪水坑水塘
Transcriptions
Yue: Cantonese
- Yale Romanization: Hùhng séui hāang séui tòhng
- Jyutping: Hung4 seoi2 haang1 seoi2 tong4

Hung Shui Hang Reservoir (also known as Tan Kwai Hang Reservoir or Hung Shui Hang Irrigation Reservoir) is a reservoir located to the north of Kau Keng Shan, Tuen Mun, New Territories, Hong Kong. It is located at the northwestern edge of Tai Lam Country Park and less than one kilometre away from Lam Tei Reservoir. Like Lam Tei Reservoir, it is part of Tai Lam Chung Reservoir's further water supply plan and an irrigation reservoir. The reservoir is divided into two reservoirs. The water from the reservoir flows through Tan Kwai Tsuen and Chung Uk Tsuen and then through Hung Shui Kiu, passing through the west side of Tin Shui Wai and finally empties into the Deep Bay.

== Usage ==
The reservoir is mainly used to irrigate agricultural land in the Yuen Long area, but it is remote and inaccessible due to its remoteness. It is close to the Lam Tei Quarry and there are no picnic facilities nearby, hence it is rarely visited on weekdays and holidays.

== See also ==
- List of reservoirs of Hong Kong
