= Shan Ha Tsuen =

Village of Hong Kong

Coordinates: 22.432301°N 114.016279°E

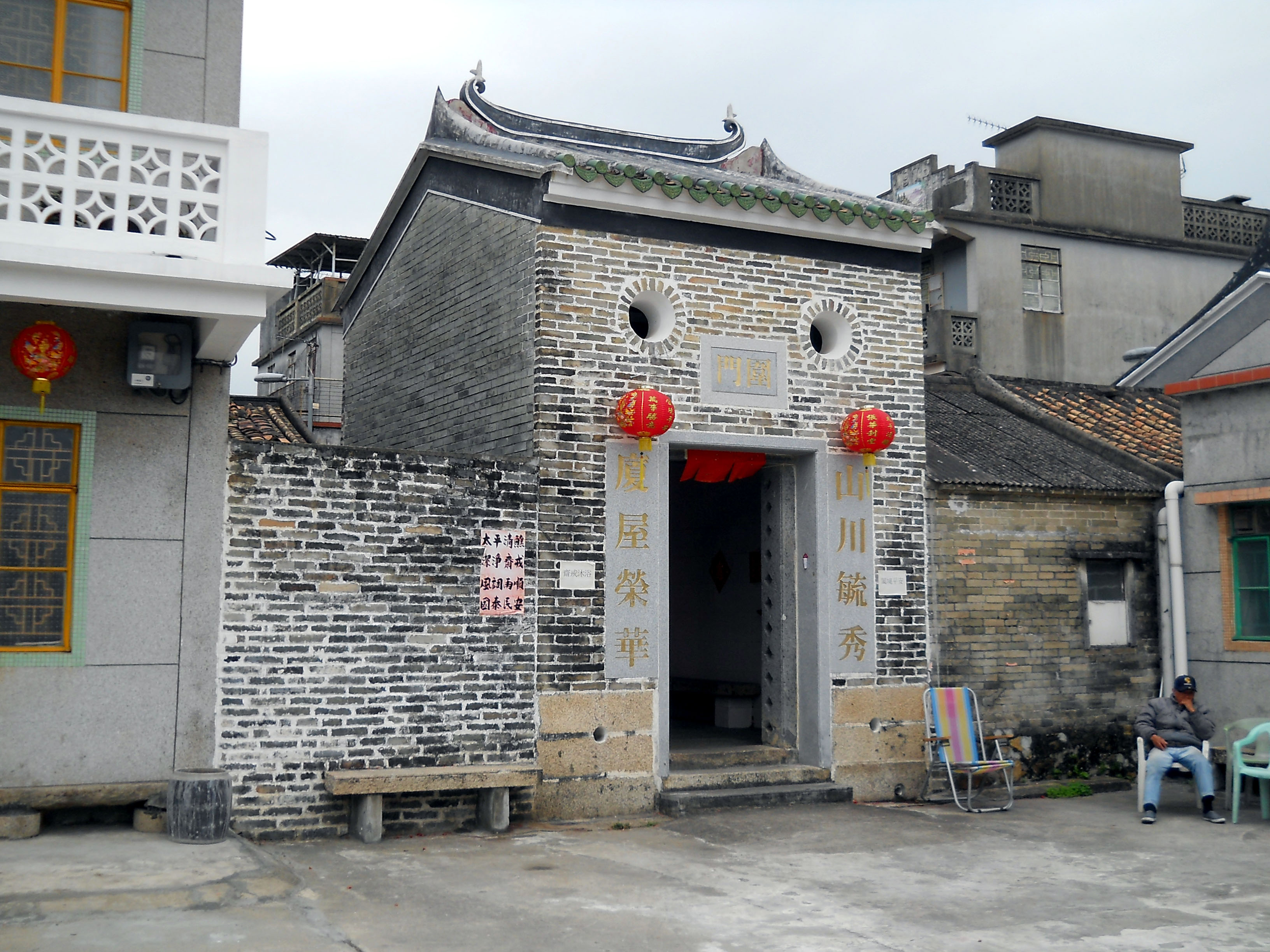
Entrance gate of Shan Ha Tsuen in February 2011.

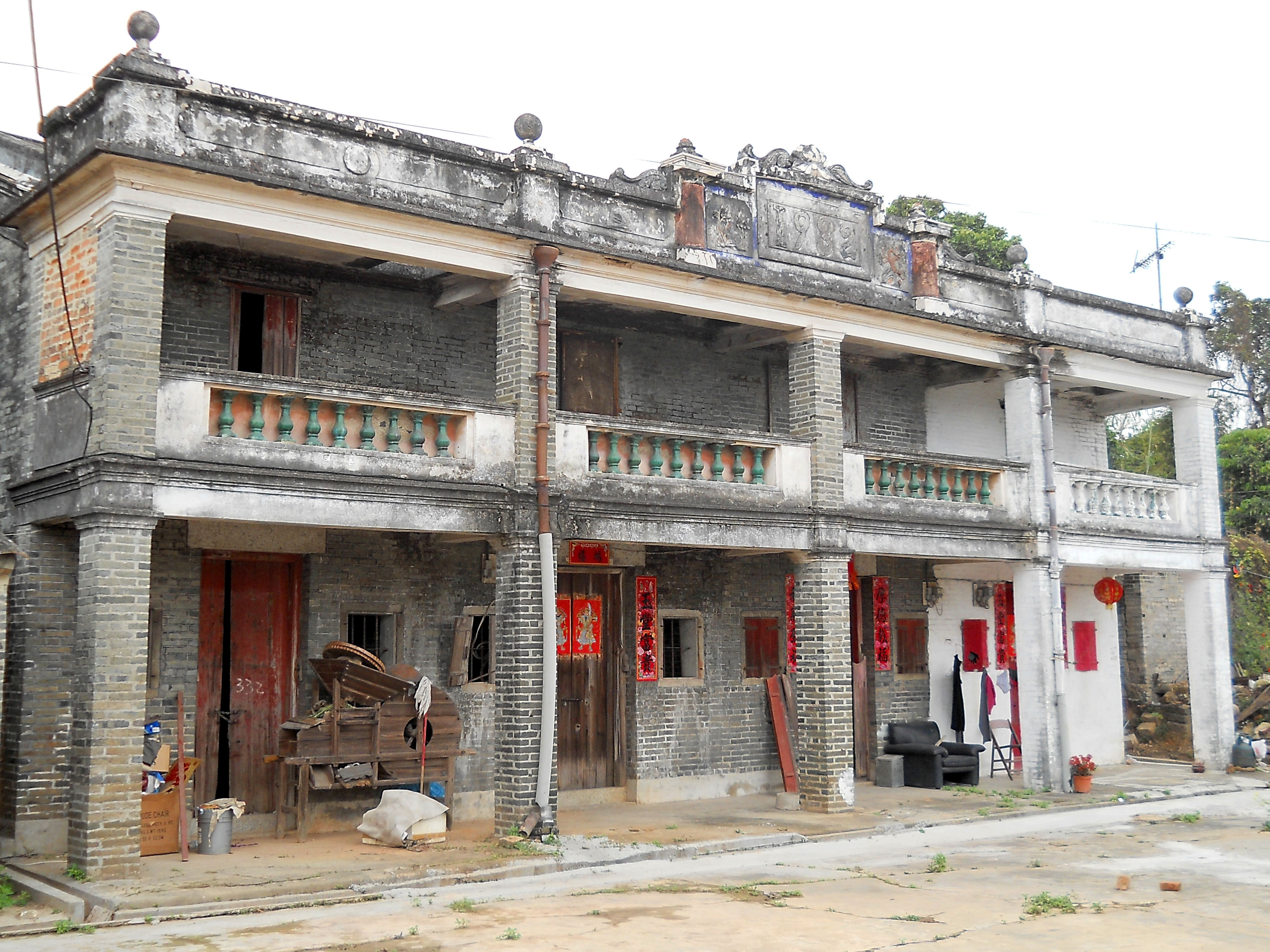
Nos. 329-332 Shan Ha Tsuen.

Shan Ha Tsuen (Chinese: 山下村) is a walled village in Yuen Long District, Hong Kong.

== Administration ==
Shan Ha is a recognized village under the New Territories Small House Policy. Shan Ha Tsuen is one of the 37 villages represented within the Ping Shan Rural Committee. For electoral purposes, Shan Ha Tsuen is part of the Ping Shan South constituency.

== Education ==
Shan Ha Tsuen is in Primary One Admission (POA) School Net 73. Within the school net are multiple aided schools (operated independently but funded with government money) and one government school: South Yuen Long Government Primary School (南元朗官立小學).

== See also ==
- Walled villages of Hong Kong
