= Tong Yan San Tsuen =

Village of Hong Kong

Coordinates: 22.43508°N 114.010241°E

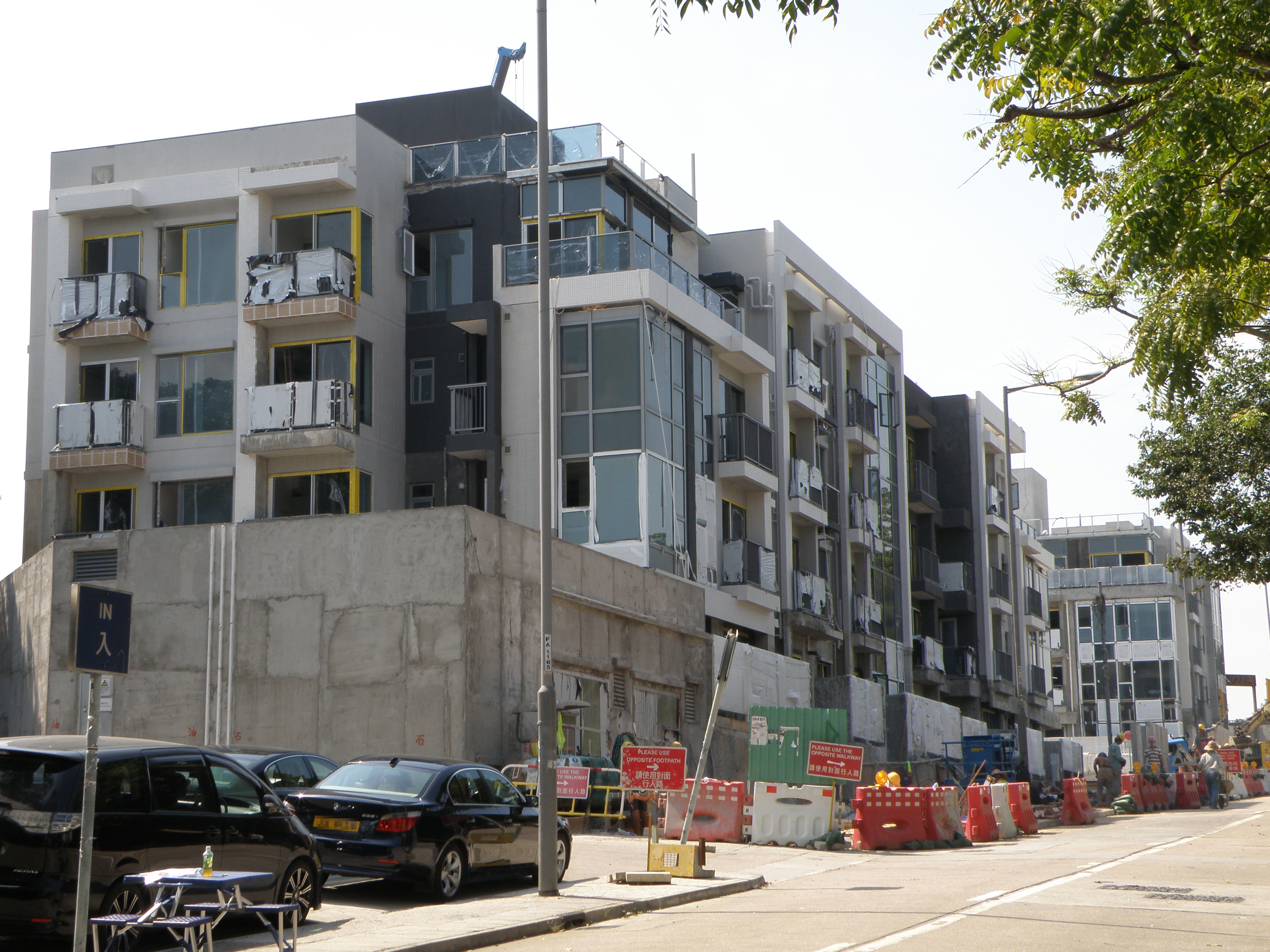
The Parkhill (柏𣾷), a private housing estate in Tong Yan San Tsuen, under construction in 2015.

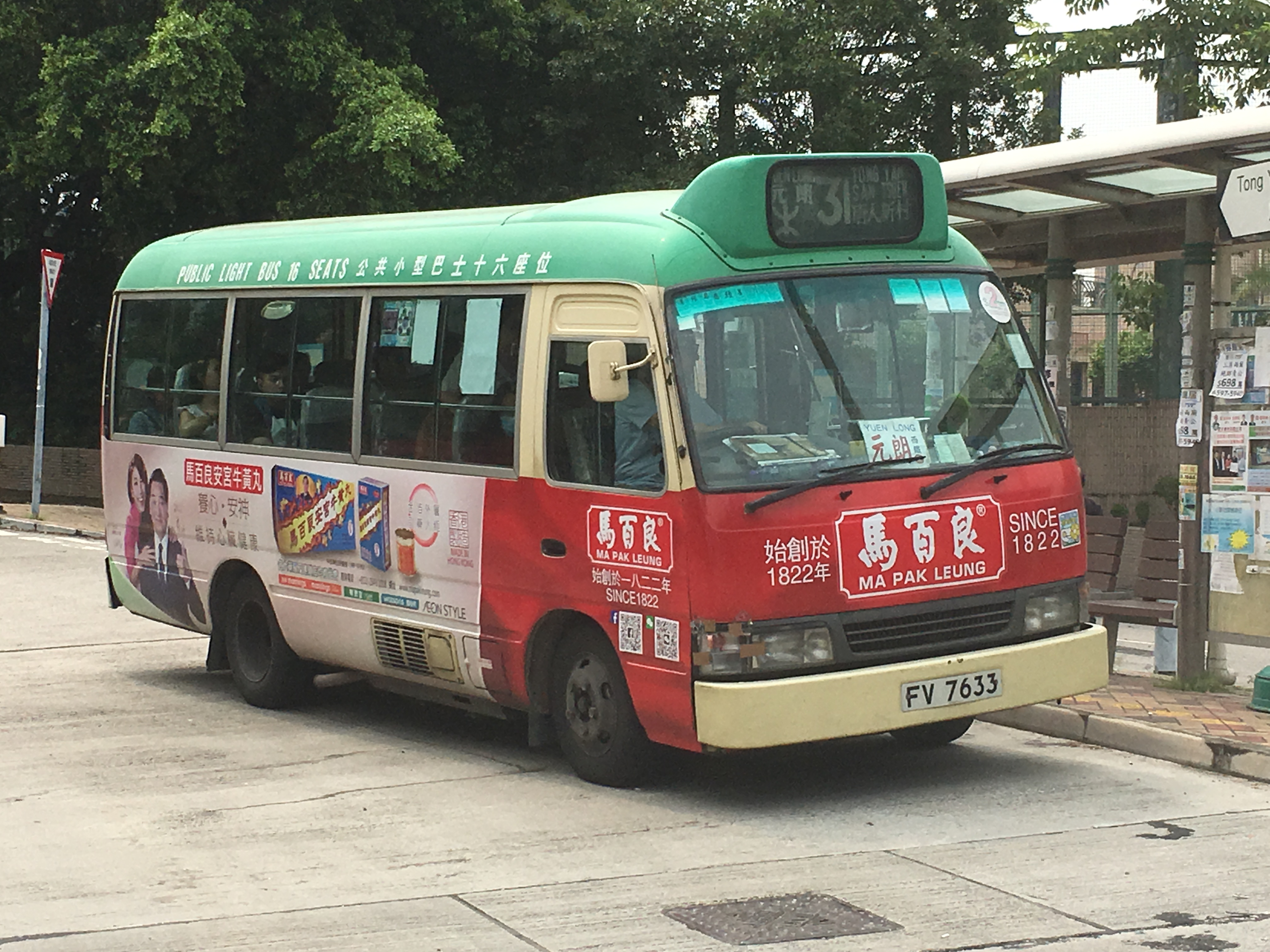
Public light bus serving New Territories Public Light Bus Route 31 in Tong Yan San Tsuen Road (唐人新村路).

Tong Yan San Tsuen (Chinese: 唐人新村) is a village in the Ping Shan area of Yuen Long District, Hong Kong.

== Administration ==
Tong Yan San Tsuen is one of the 37 villages represented within the Ping Shan Rural Committee. For electoral purposes, Tong Yan San Tsuen is part of the Ping Shan South constituency, which was formerly represented by Leung Tak-ming until July 2021.

== History ==
The village was established by Tong Hung-ki (唐鴻基) in 1932 and was settled by the Lam (林) and Tong (唐) families from Zhongshan, in Guangdong province. After World War II, it was inhabited by immigrants from mainland China, with most of them speaking a Shanghai dialect.

== Features ==
There is a Yeung Hau Temple in Tong Yan San Tsuen. It was built in 1711. The temple is listed as a Grade III historic building.
