= Lam Hau Tsuen =

Coordinates: 22.434992°N 114.018248°E

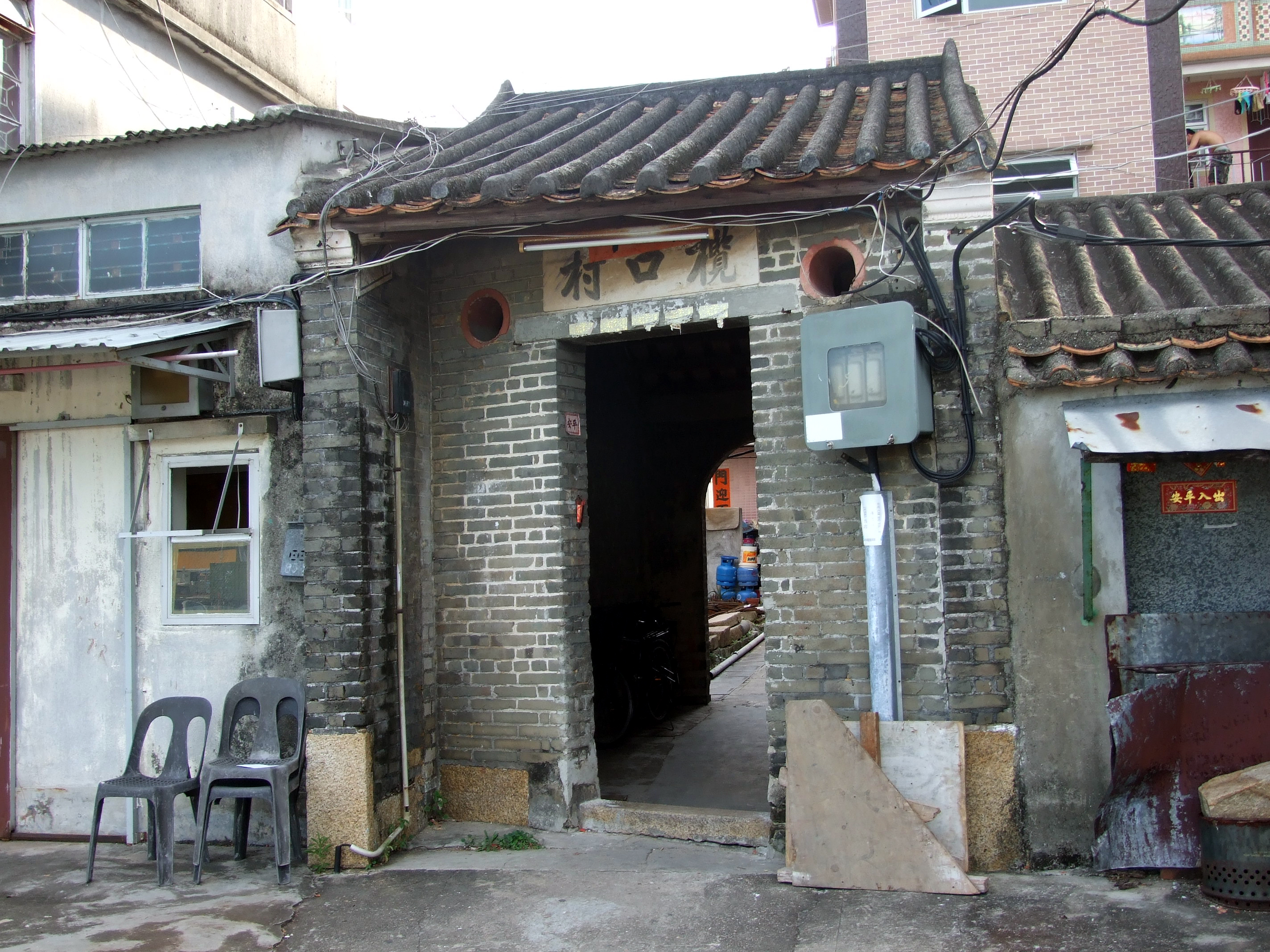
Entrance gate of Lam Hau Tsuen in June 2013.

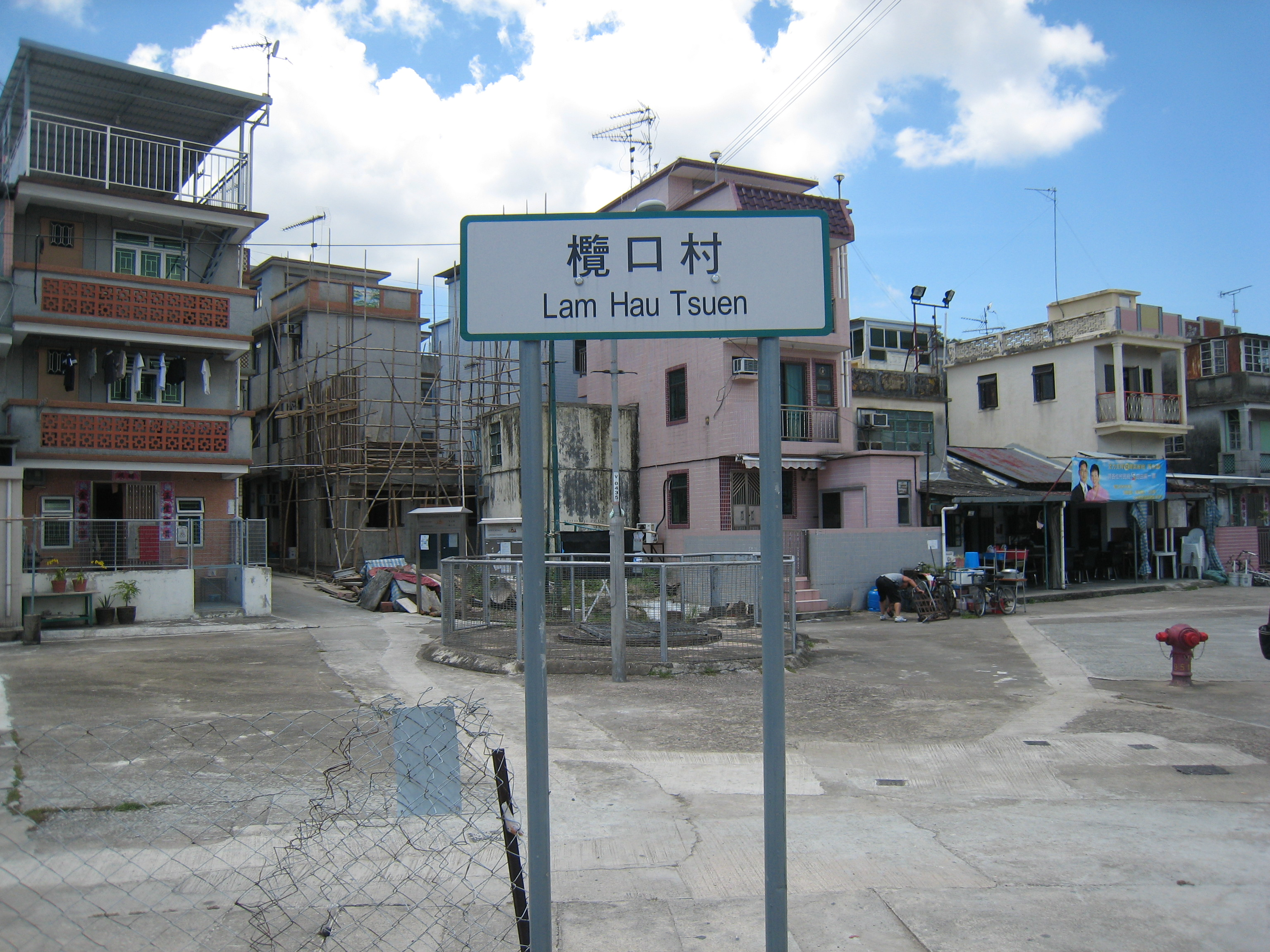
Lam Hau Tsuen in August 2008.

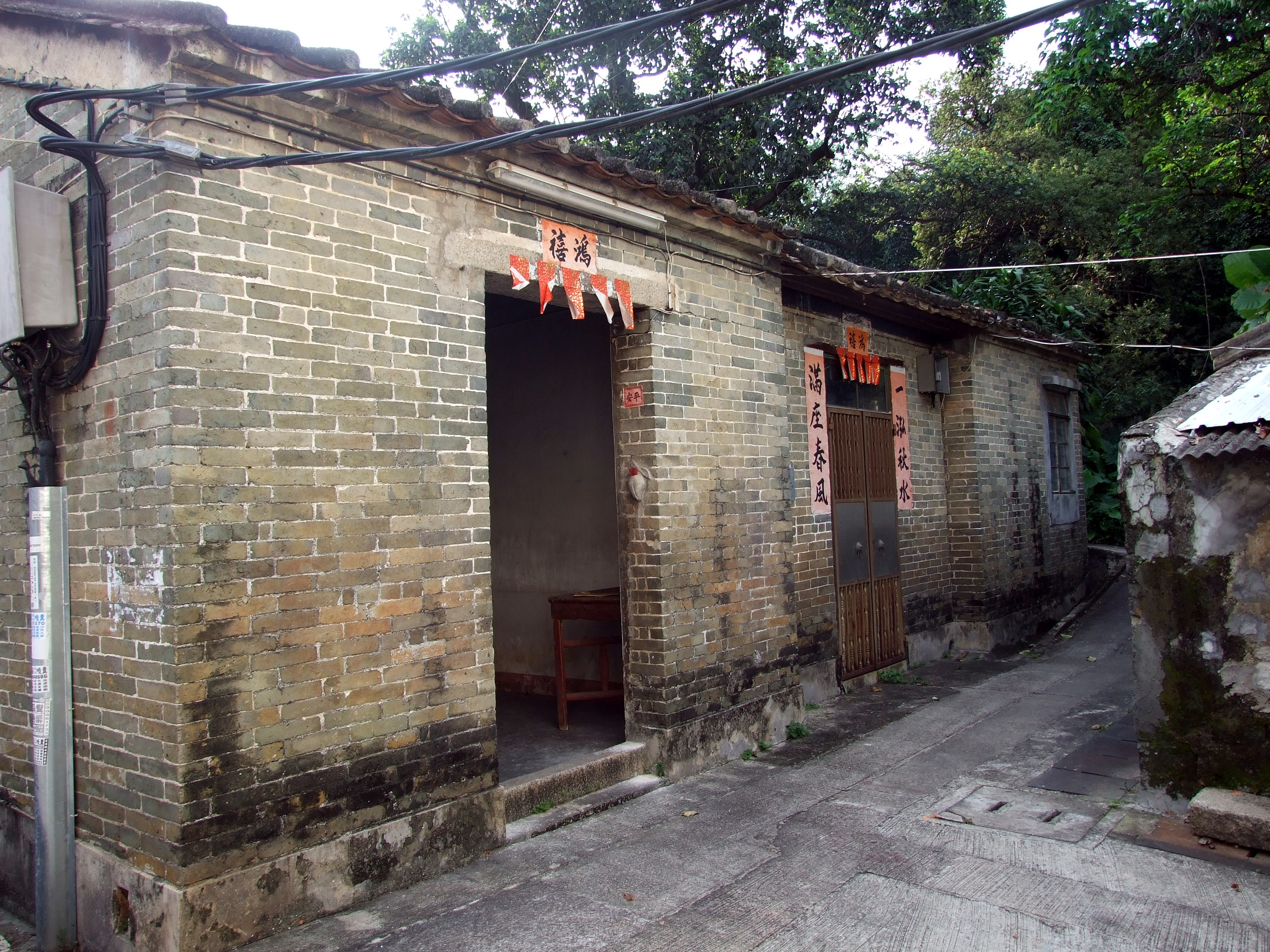
Village shrine of Lam Hau Tsuen.

Lam Hau Tsuen (Chinese: 欖口村) is a walled village in Ping Shan, Yuen Long District, Hong Kong.

== Administration ==
Lam Hau Tsuen is a recognized village under the New Territories Small House Policy. It is one of the 37 villages represented within the Ping Shan Rural Committee. For electoral purposes, Lam Hau Tsuen is part of the Ping Shan South constituency.

== History ==
At the time of the 1911 census, the population of Lam Hau was 237. The number of males was 107.

== See also ==
- Walled villages of Hong Kong
