= Hung Fuk Estate =

Housing estate in Hung Shui Kiu, Hong Kong

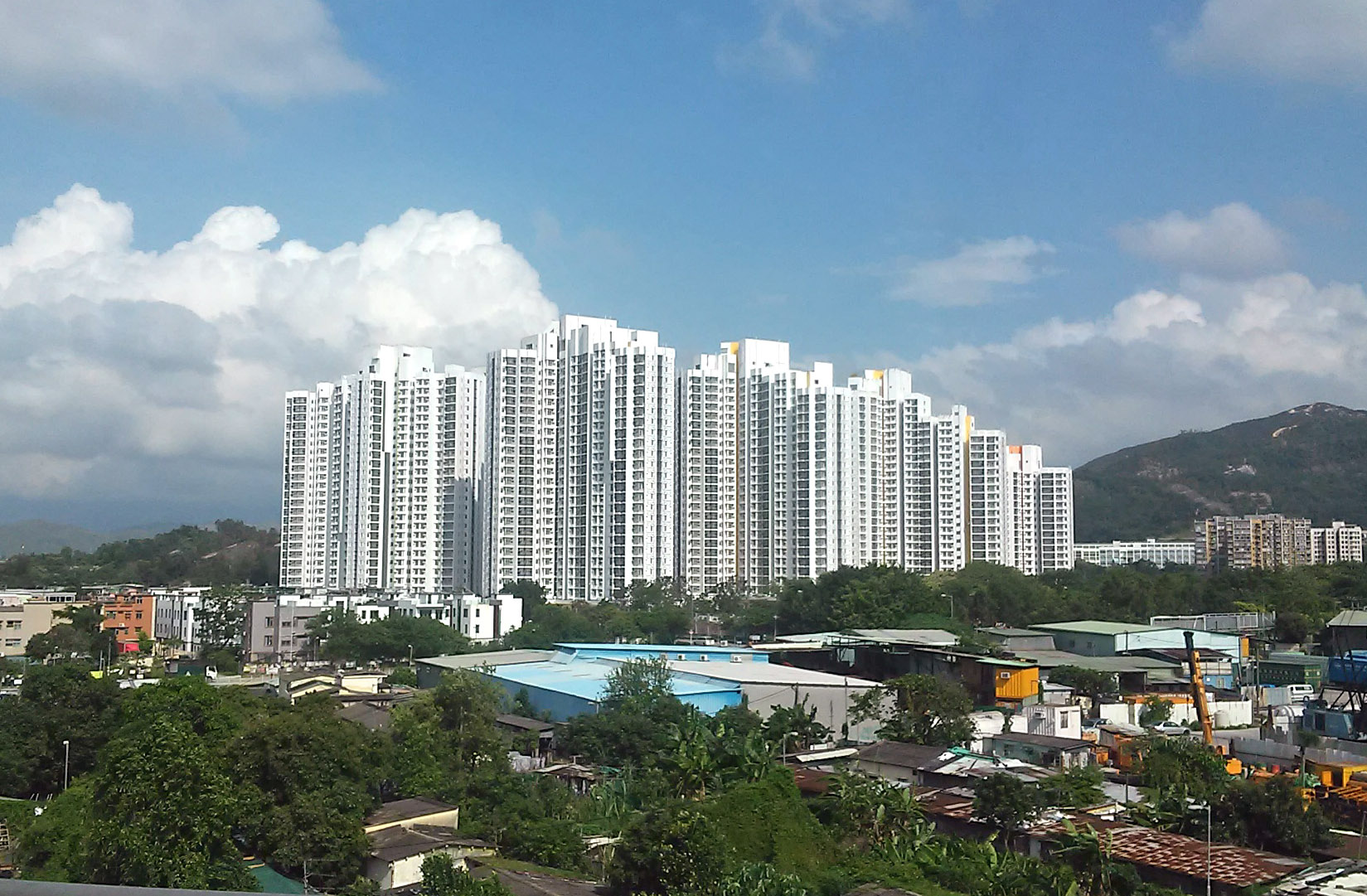
- Hung Fuk Estate viewed from West Rail line, 2015
- Interactive map of Hung Fuk Estate

General information
- Location: 1 Hung Yuen Road, Hung Shui Kiu; New Territories, Hong Kong
- Coordinates: 22.438°N 113.997°E
- Status: Completed
- Category: Public rental housing
- Area: 6.4 ha (16 acres)
- Population: 9,255 (2016)
- No. of blocks: 9
- No. of units: 4,905

Construction
- Constructed: 2015; 11 years ago
- Authority: Hong Kong Housing Authority

Hung Fuk Estate
- Chinese: 洪福邨
- Cantonese Yale: hùhng fūk chyūn
Transcriptions
Yue: Cantonese
- Yale Romanization: hùhng fūk chyūn
- Jyutping: hung4 fuk1 cyun1

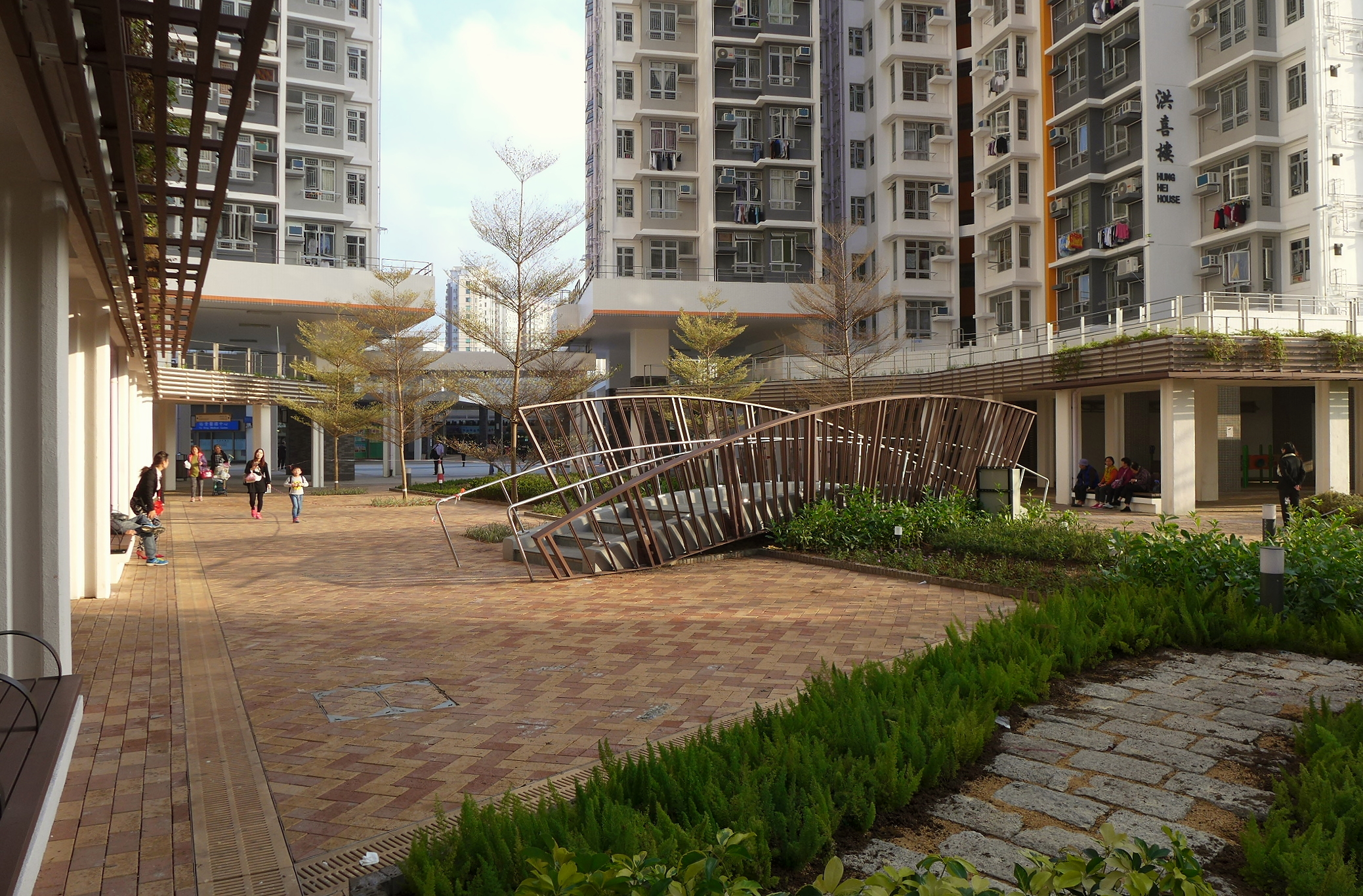
Open space

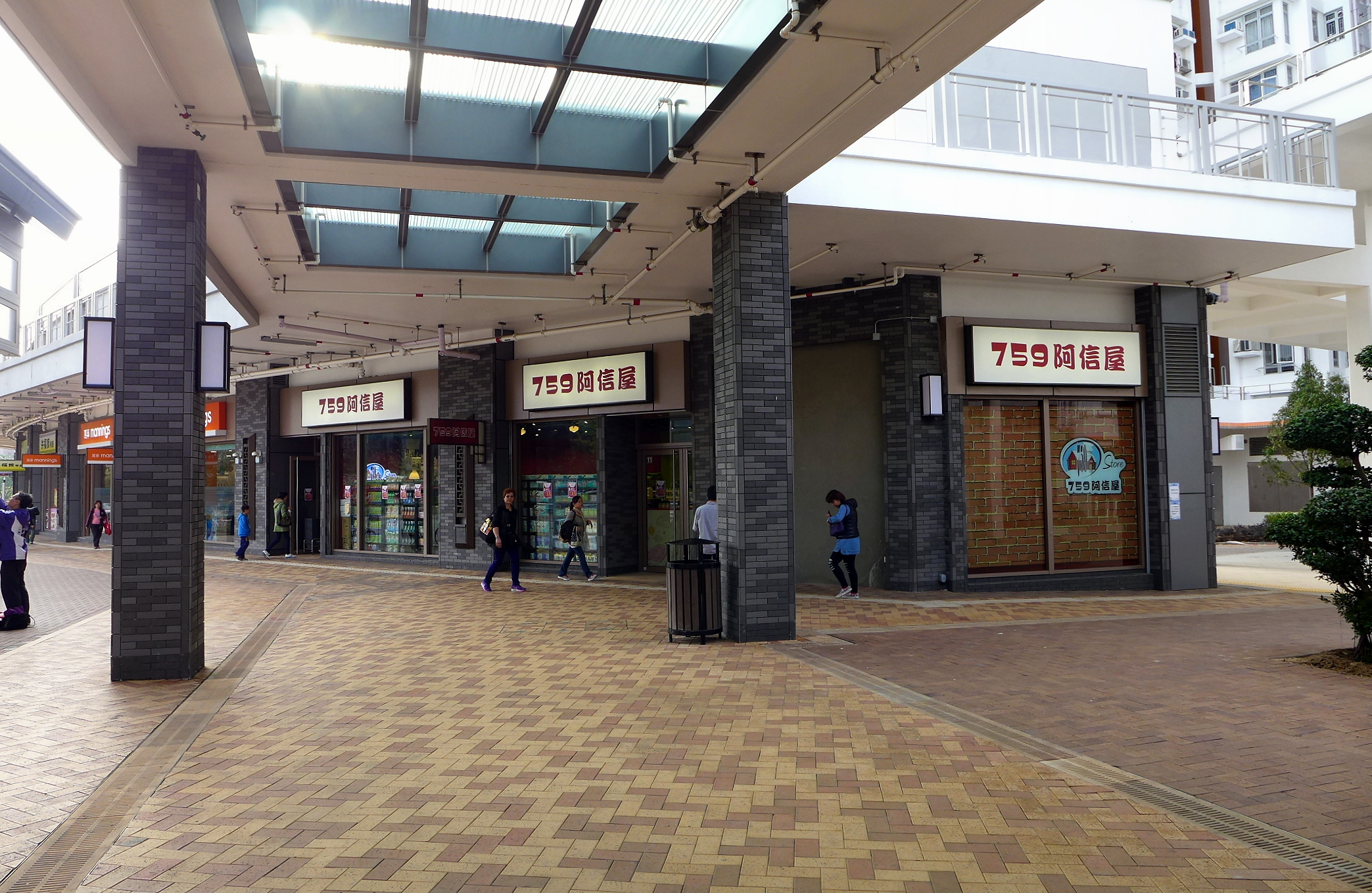
Shops in Hung Fuk Estate

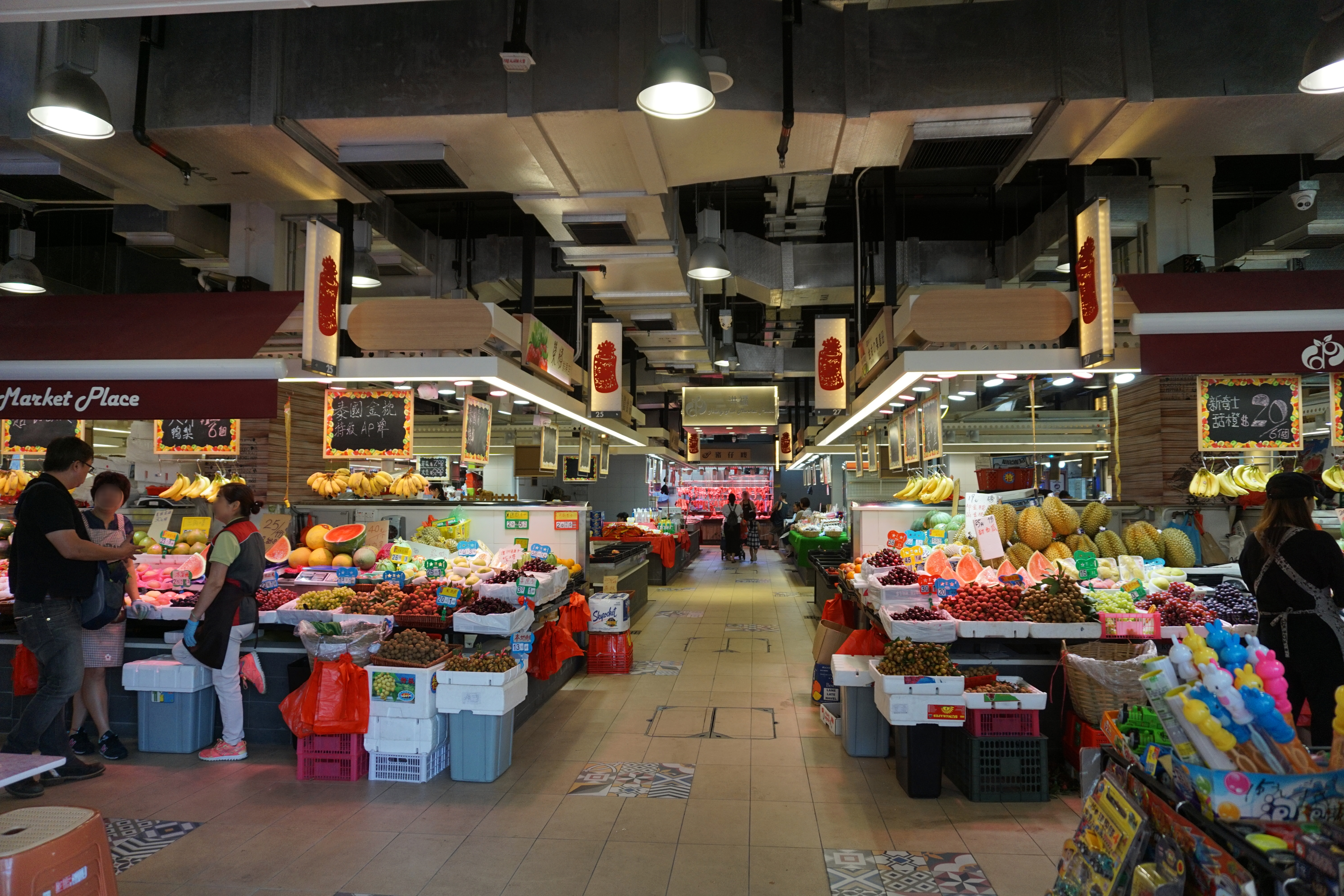
Market

Hung Fuk Estate (Chinese: 洪福邨) is a public housing estate in Hung Shui Kiu, New Territories, Hong Kong. It comprises nine blocks with a total of 4,905 flats. It was completed in 2015 and is the first public estate in Hung Shui Kiu, which is planned to undergo large-scale development as a new town.

== History ==
The estate is one of the first large developments in Hung Shui Kiu, which the Hong Kong Government plans to develop into a new town.

The Hsin Chong construction company built the first and second phases, comprising four domestic blocks, the single-storey commercial centre, and a three-storey car park.

The third phase was built by Yau Lee Group between January 2013 and April 2015. It comprises five residential blocks, a kindergarten, an elderly centre, and an integrated children and youth centre. The construction contract for this phase was valued at HK$1,232.47 million.

== Description ==
The estate, managed by the Hong Kong Housing Authority, is located in Hung Shui Kiu Area 13 and has a site area of about 6.4 hectares.

The nine residential blocks provide 4,905 flats designed to accommodate around 12,900 people. They range in height from 16 to 24 storeys, which is unusually short by Hong Kong standards.

Aside from the residential blocks, the estate also includes a bus terminus, a shopping centre, a market, and various community facilities including a kindergarten, an elderly centre, and a youth centre.

The Social Welfare Department has proposed setting up a 50-place hostel for moderately mentally handicapped persons, as well as a 160-place integrated vocational rehabilitation services centre, within the Ancillary Facilities Block of Hung Fuk Estate.

== Houses ==
Name	Chinese name	Block no.	Building type	Phase	Completed
Hung Foon House	洪歡樓	1	Non-standard block (cruciform)	1	2015
Hung Yan House	洪欣樓	2	Non-standard block (cruciform)	1	2015
Hung Hei House	洪喜樓	3	Non-standard block (cruciform)	1	2015
Hung Lok House	洪樂樓	4	Non-standard block (cruciform)	2	2015
Hung Long House	洪塱樓	5	Non-standard block (Y-shaped)	3	2015
Hung Yat House	洪溢樓	6	Non-standard block (Y-shaped)	3	2015
Hung Yuet House	洪悅樓	7	Non-standard block (Y-shaped)	3	2015
Hung Cheong House	洪昌樓	8	Non-standard block (cruciform)	3	2015
Hung Shing House	洪盛樓	9	Non-standard block (cruciform)	3	2015

== Demographics ==
According to the 2016 by-census, Hung Fuk Estate had a population of 9,255. The median age was 37.5 and the majority of residents (98 per cent) were of Chinese ethnicity. Cantonese was the usual spoken language of 90.7 per cent of residents (excluding non-speaking persons). The average household size was 2.4 people. The median monthly household income of all households (i.e. including both economically active and inactive households) was HK$12,250.

== Politics ==
Hung Fuk Estate is located in Hung Fuk constituency of the Yuen Long District Council. It is currently represented by Eddie Chan Shu-fai, who was elected in the 2019 elections.

== Transport ==
The Hung Fuk Estate Public Transport Interchange is a covered bus station with three bays for franchised buses as well as a lay-by for green minibuses.

The estate is also 400 metres away from the Hung Shui Kiu stop on the Light Rail.

== Features ==
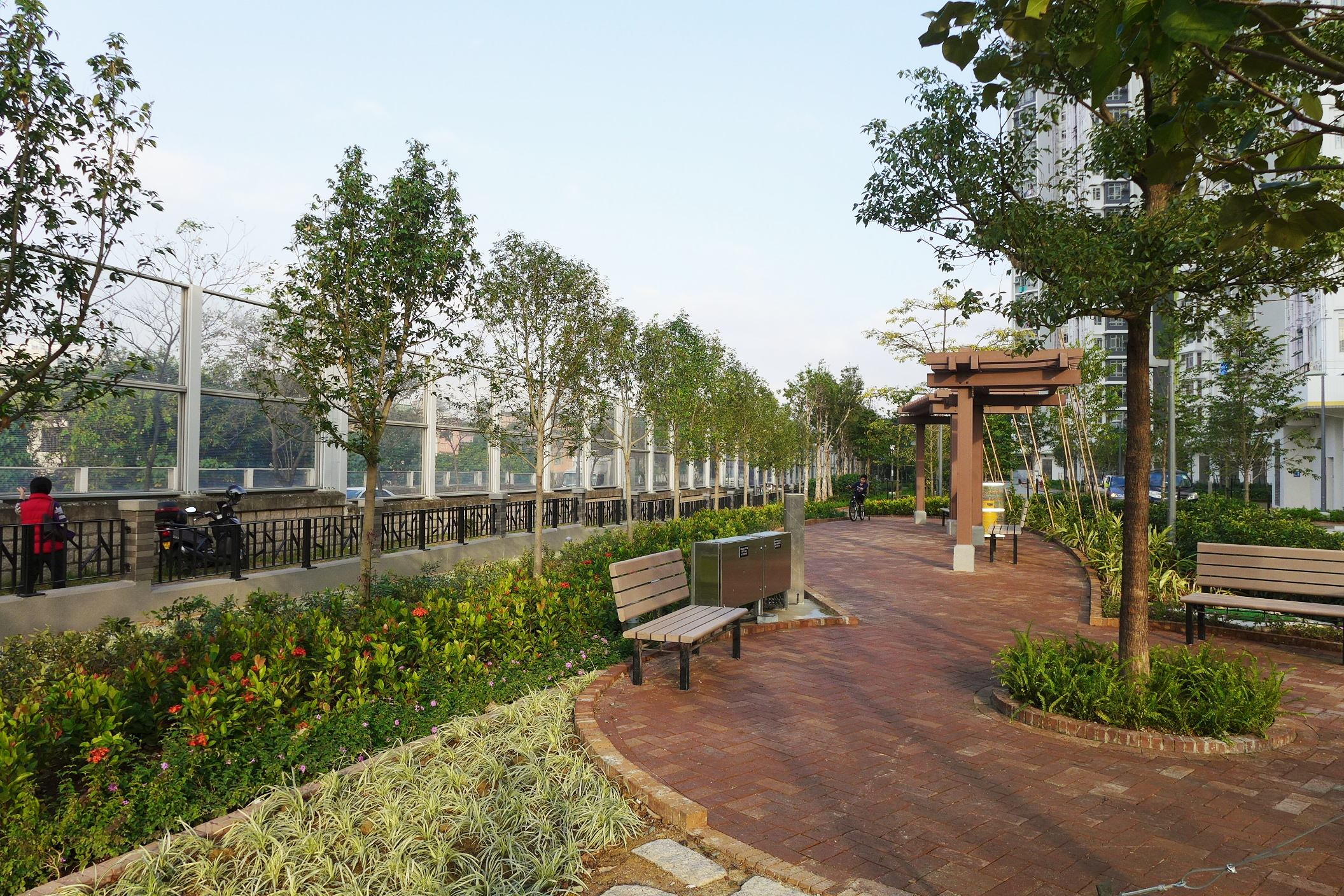
Jogging tracks

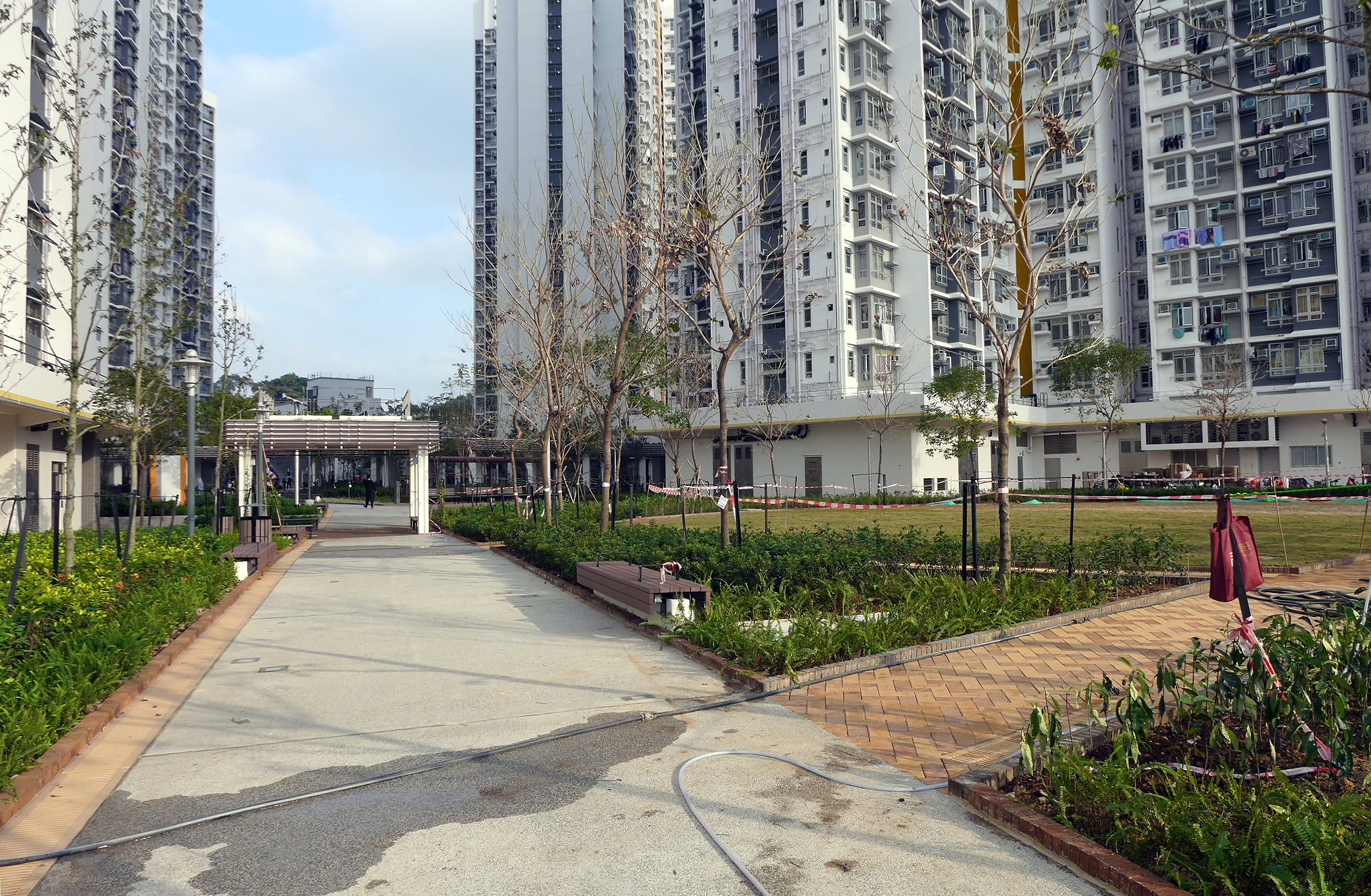
Lawn

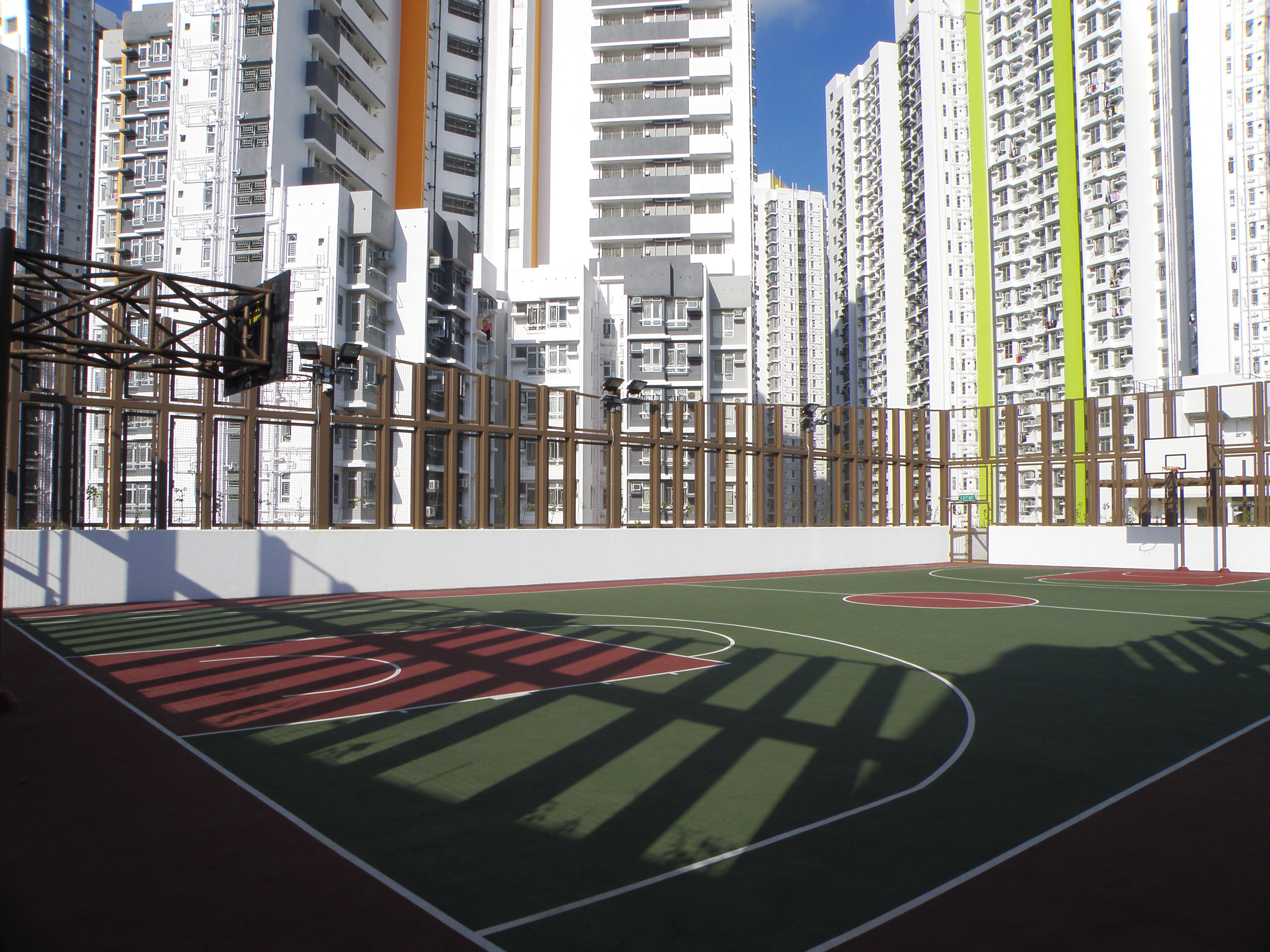
Basketball court(1)

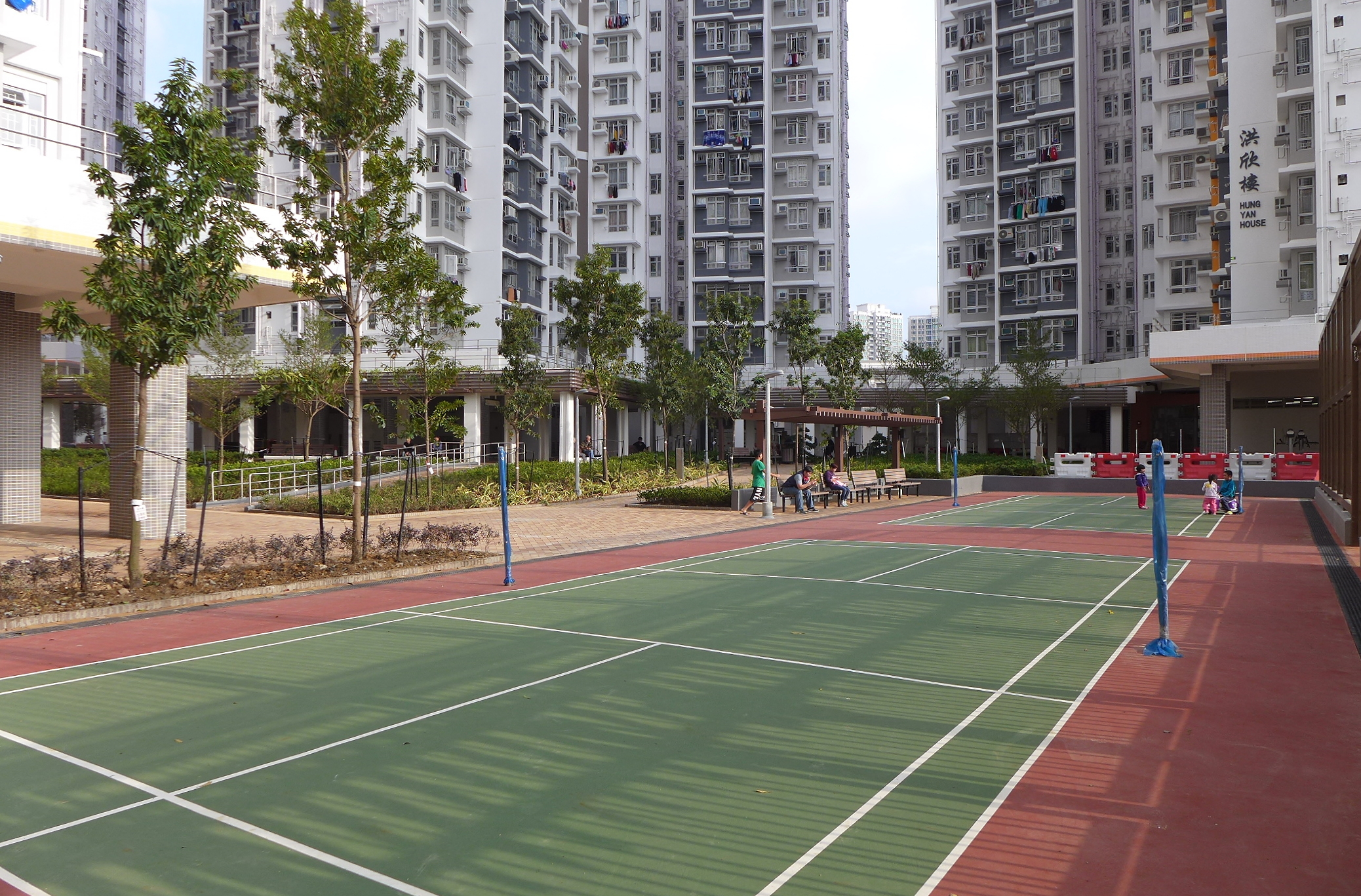
Badminton court

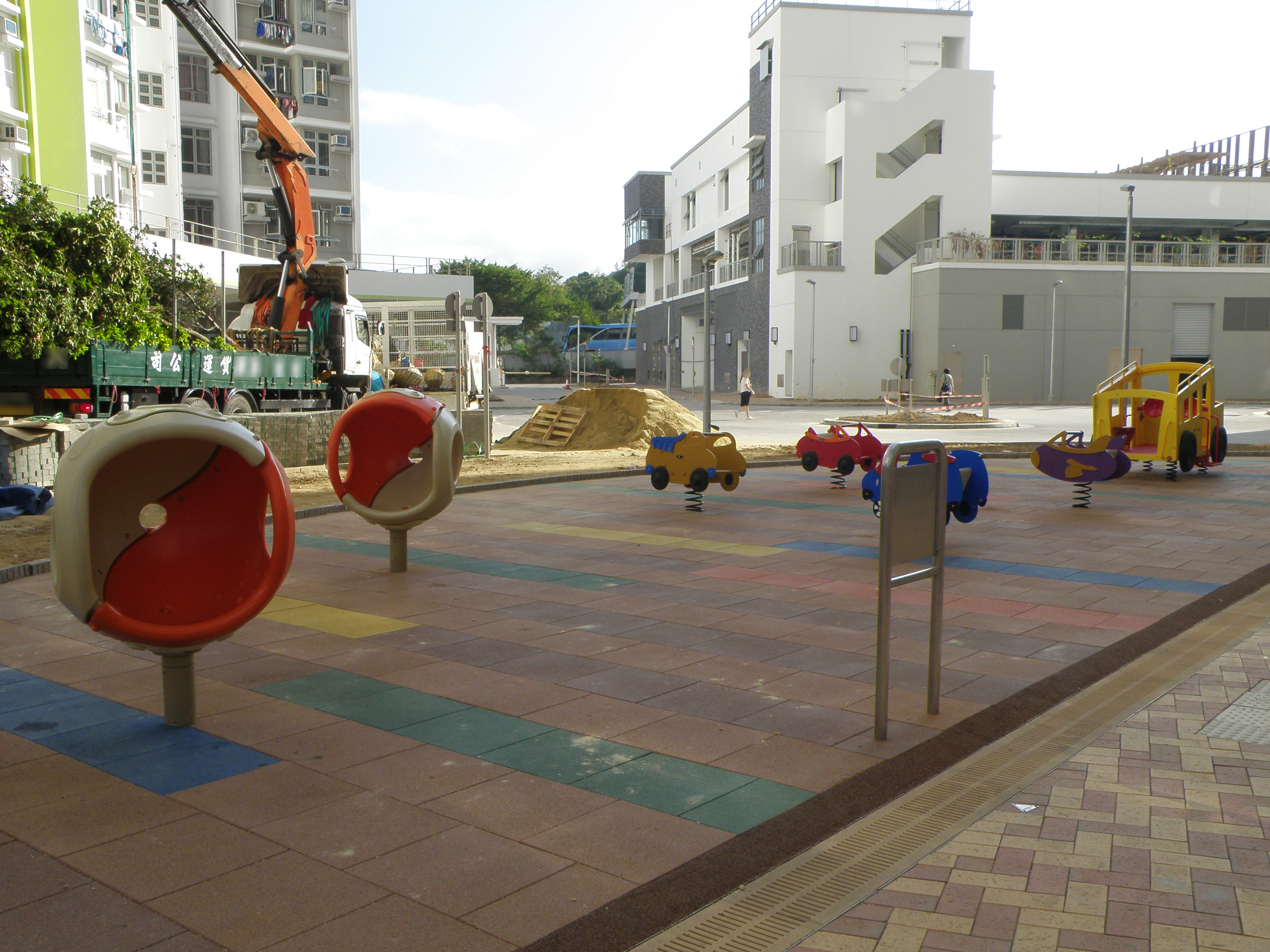
Children's playground (1)

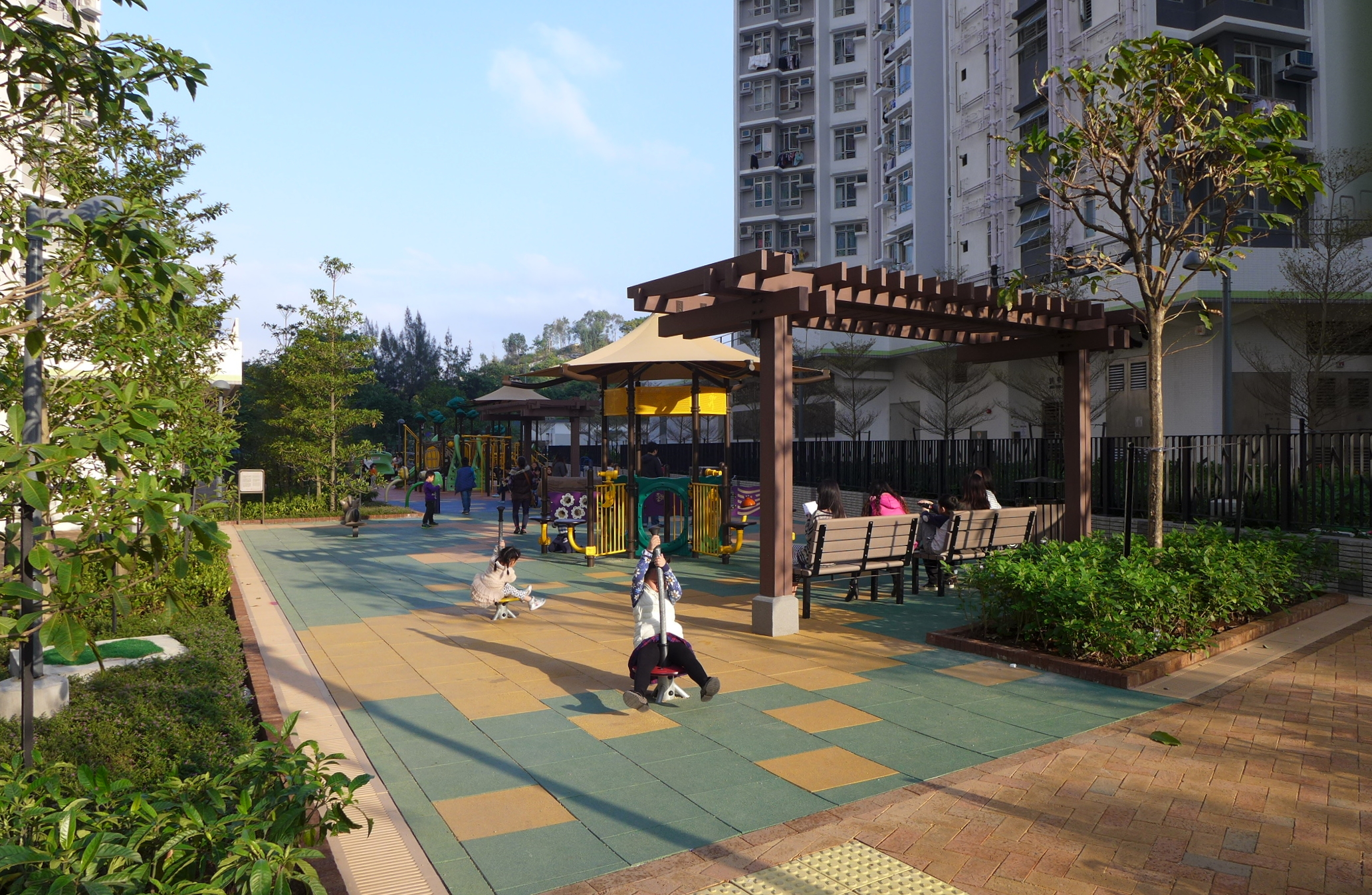
Children's playground (2)

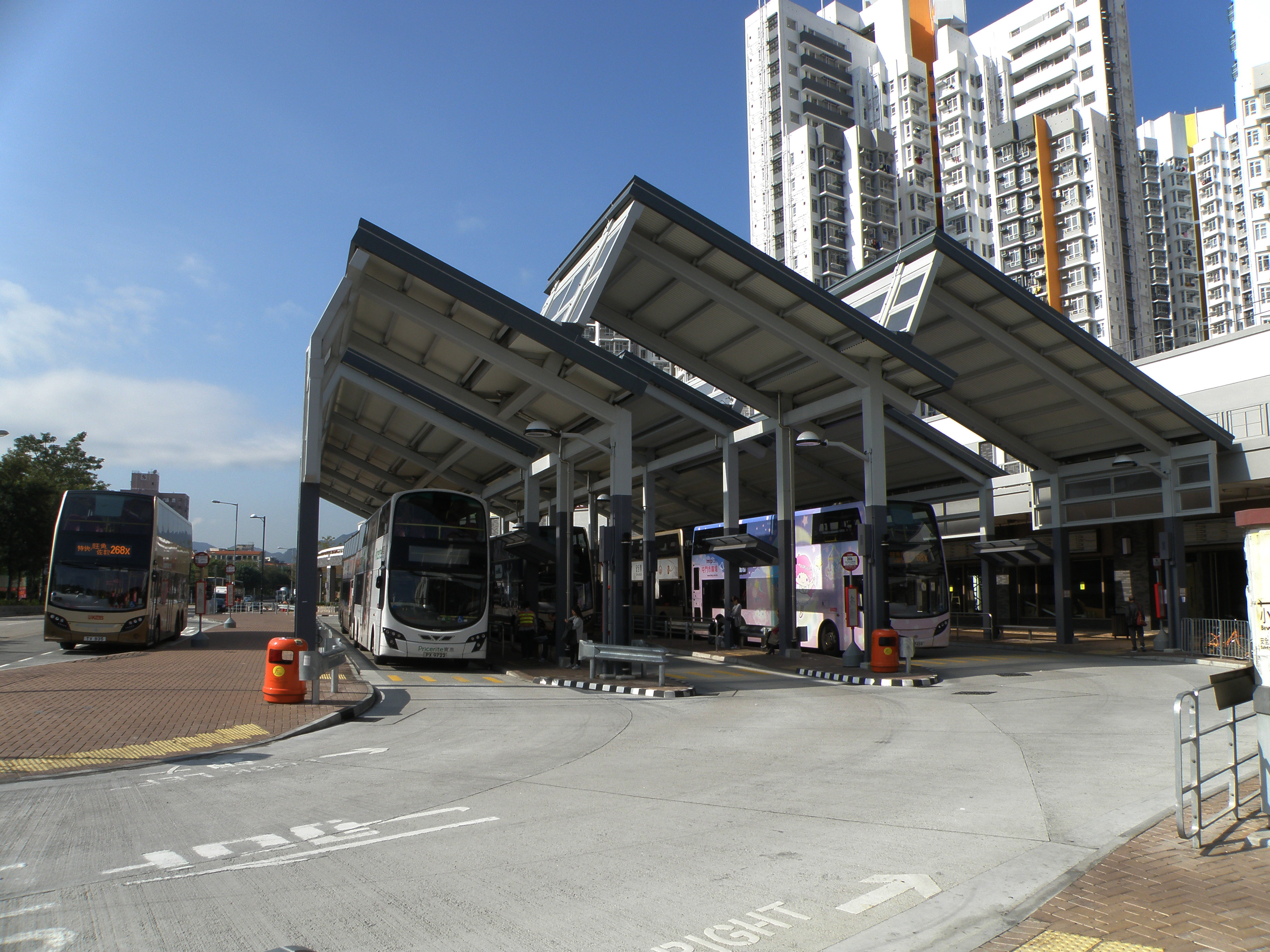
Hung Fuk Estate Public Transport Interchange
