= Hung Shui Kiu station =

Under construction MTR station in Hong Kong

Hung Shui Kiu 洪水橋
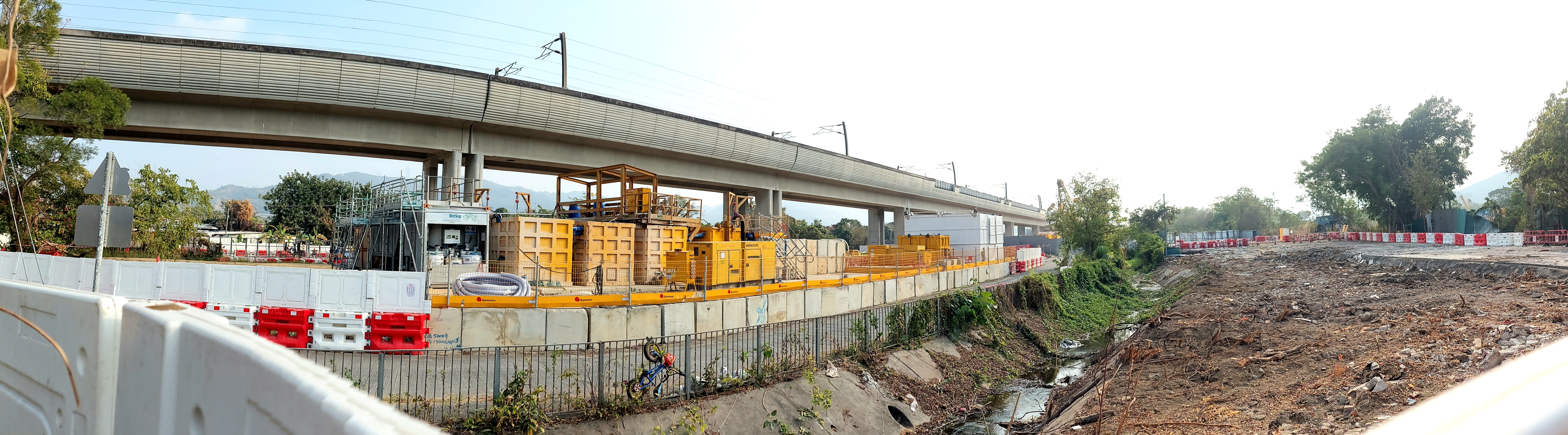
- West side of the Hung Shui Kiu station construction site (January 2026)

General information
- Location: Hung Shui Kiu; Yuen Long District, Hong Kong
- Coordinates: 22°25′55″N 113°59′18″E
- System: Under construction MTR rapid transit station (Project gazetted, construction began 2024)
- Owner: KCR Corporation
- Operator: MTR Corporation
- Line: Tuen Ma line
- Platforms: 2 side platforms
- Tracks: 2

Construction
- Structure type: Elevated

Other information
- Status: Approved, construction began 2024
- Station code: HSK

History
- Opening: 2030; 4 years' time

Key dates
- 2021: Planning and design commences
- 2023: Project gazetted under the Railway Ordinance
- 2024: Expected commencement of construction
- 2030: Expected completion of construction

Services
Preceding station	MTR	Following station
Siu Hong towards Tuen Mun South	Tuen Ma line	Tin Shui Wai towards Wu Kai Sha
Location
- Location within MTR

Hung Shui Kiu (Chinese: 洪水橋) is an under construction MTR station on the Tuen Ma line. It will be located at Hung Shui Kiu, Yuen Long.

It is expected to cost HK$4.1 billion in December 2018 prices.

The station may also be served by the proposed Hong Kong-Shenzhen Airport Rail Link between Hong Kong International Airport, Shenzhen Bao'an International Airport, Guangzhou Baiyun International Airport and Foshan Shadi Airport.

In March 2024, the Executive Council of Hong Kong approved the construction of the station. The station is expected to be finished by 2030.

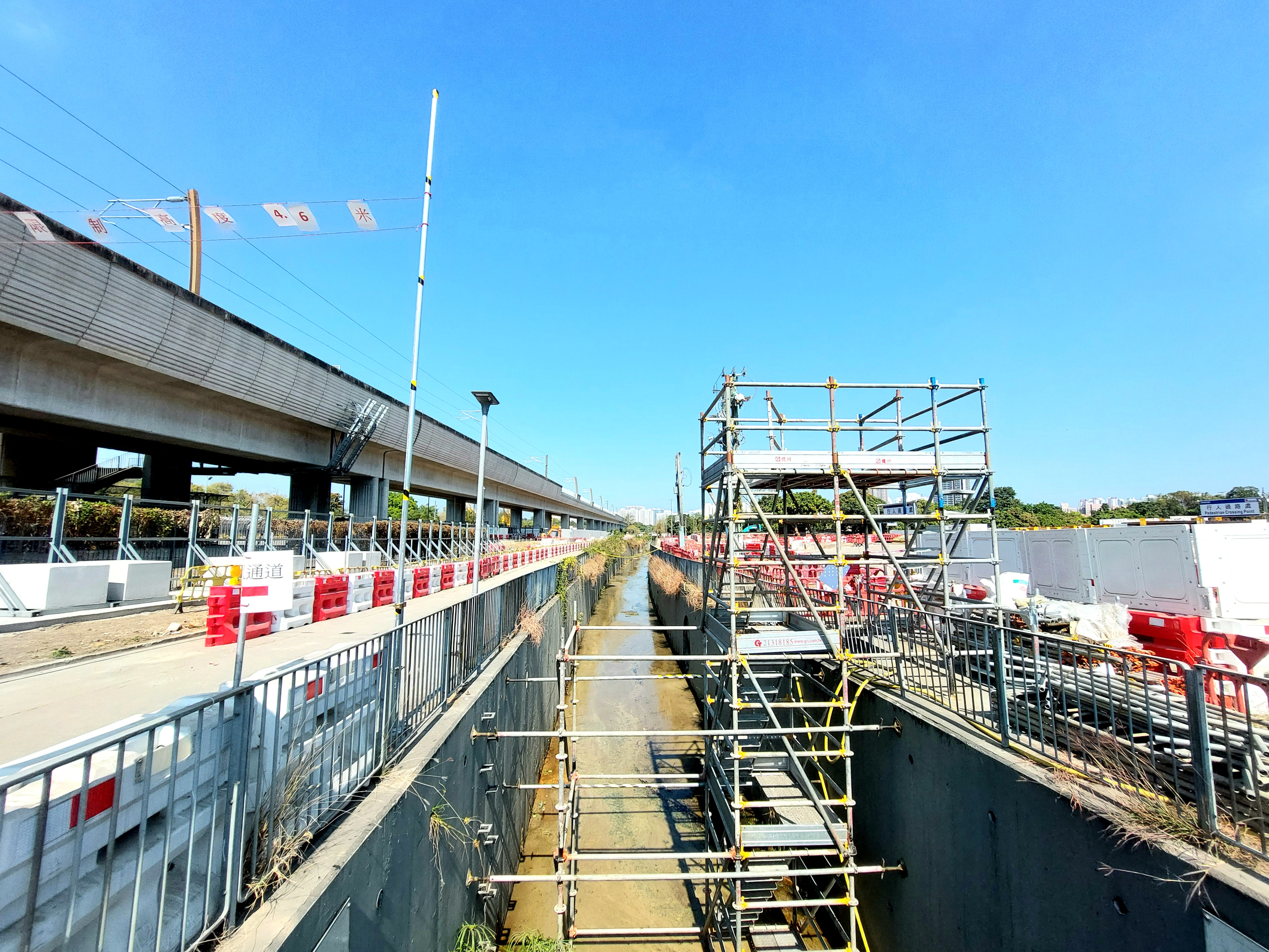
Hung Shui Kiu Station East (January 2026)

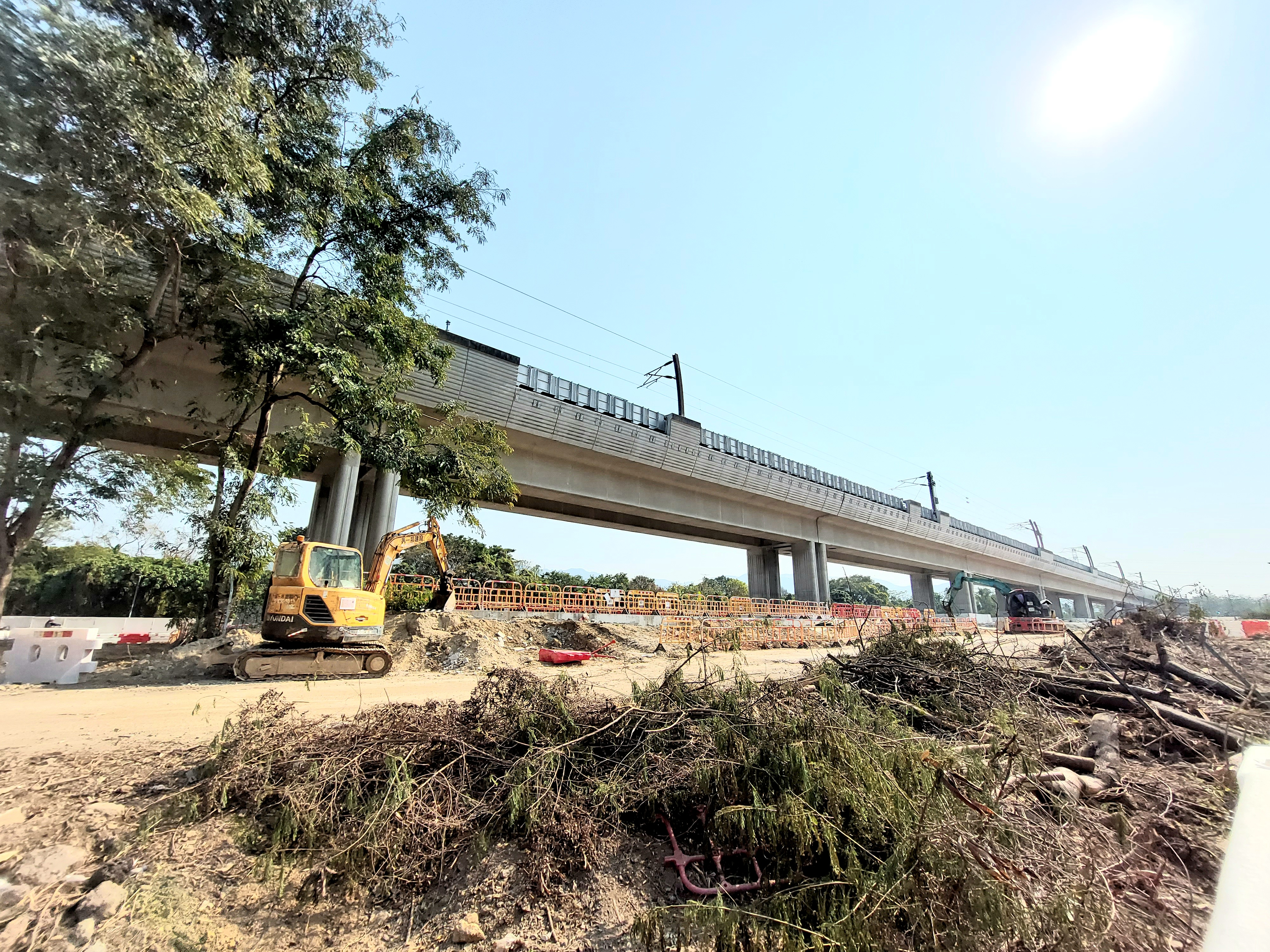
Hung Shui Kiu Station (January 2025)

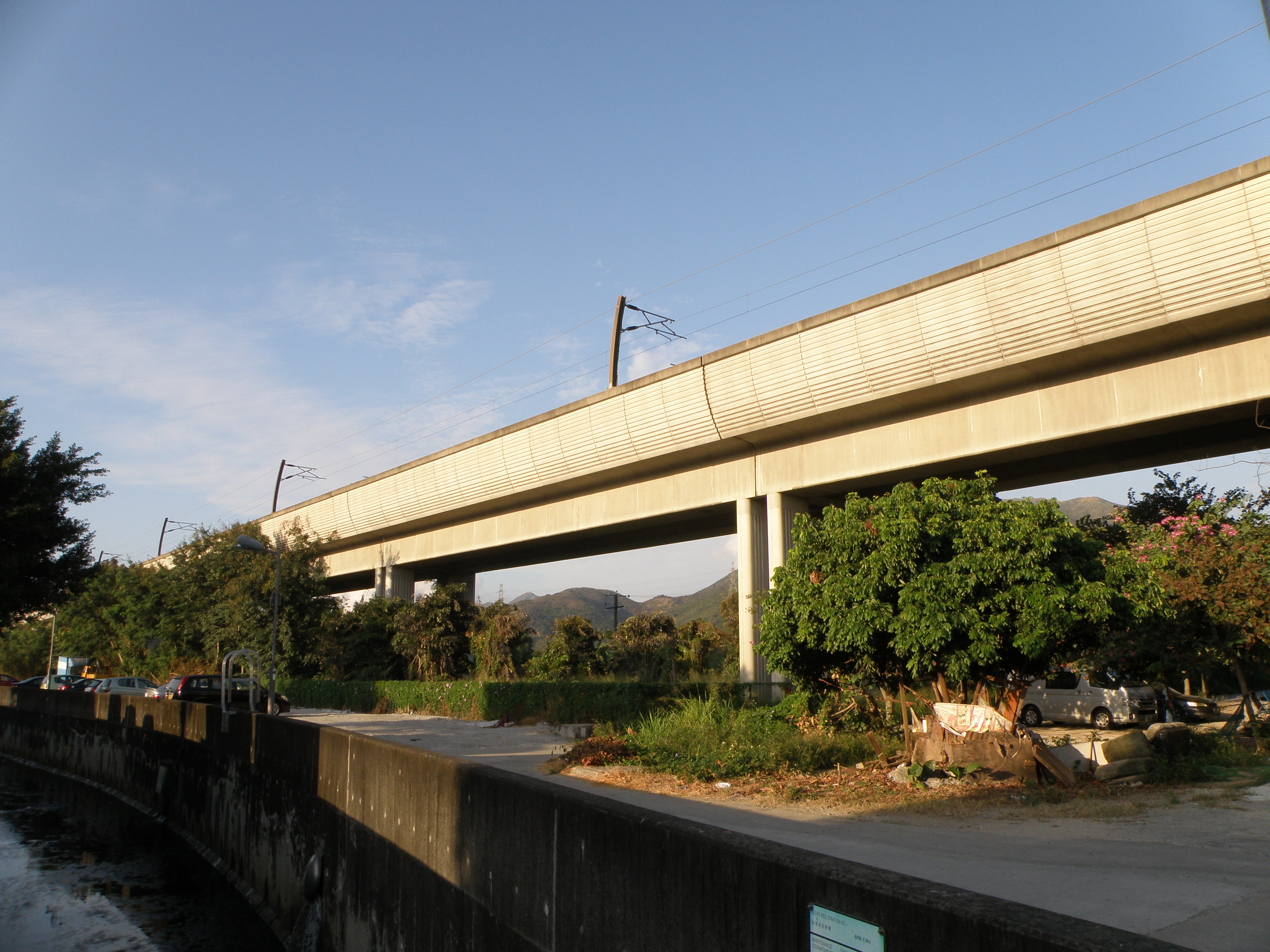
Hung Shui Kiu Station (November 2015)
