= Tin Sam Tsuen, Hung Shui Kiu =

Village in Hong Kong

Tin Sam Tsuen Chinese: 田心村
- Village
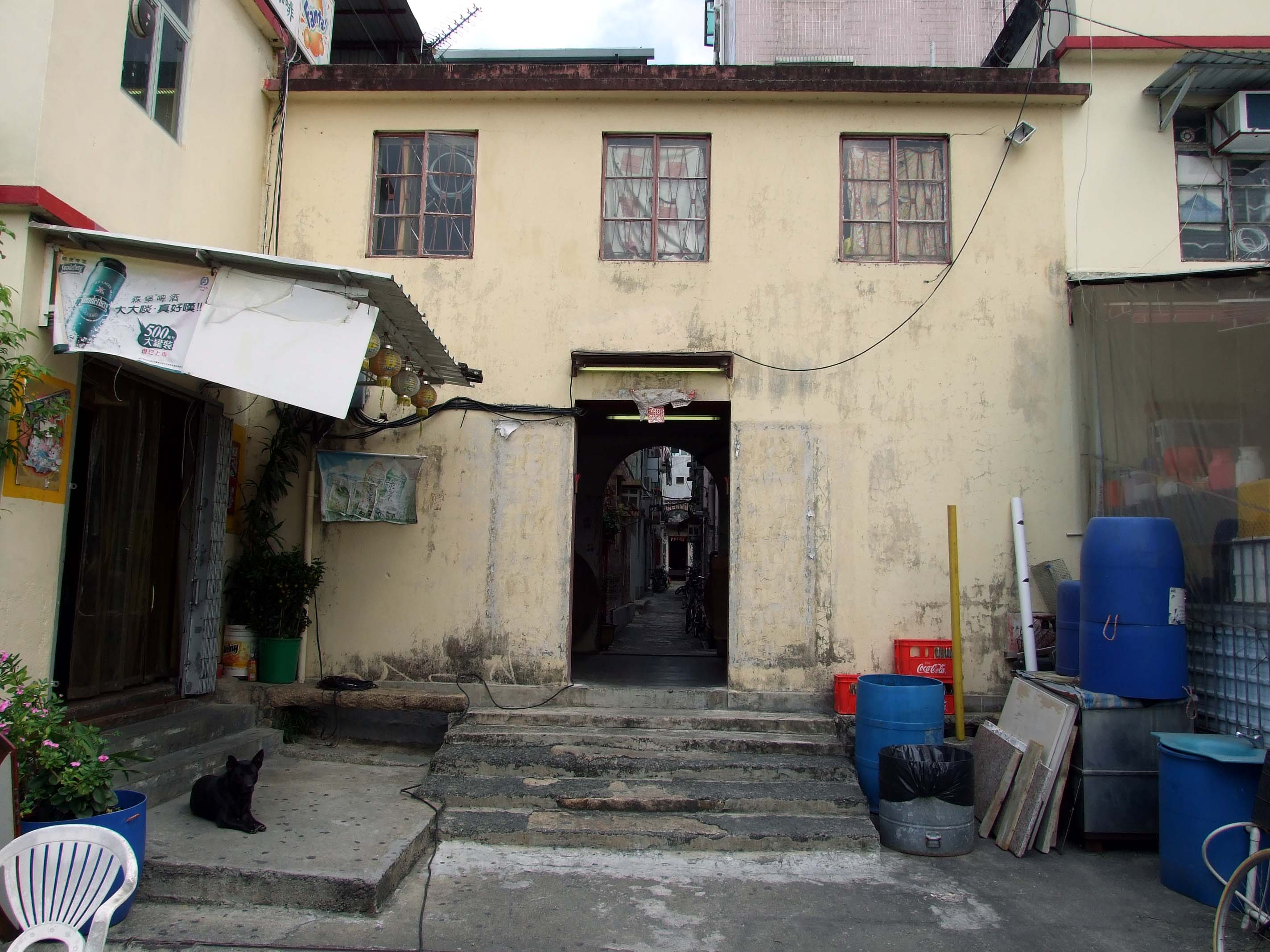
- Entrance gate of Tin Sam Tsuen

- Location within Hong Kong
- Coordinates: 22.435152°N 113.991898°E
- Country: People's Republic of China
- Special administrative region: Hong Kong
- District: Yuen Long District
- Area: Hung Shui Kiu
- Time zone: UTC+8:00 (HKT)

Tin Sam Tsuen (Chinese: 田心村) a.k.a. Tin Sam Wai (田心圍) is a walled village in Hung Shui Kiu, Ha Tsuen, Yuen Long District, Hong Kong.

== Administration ==
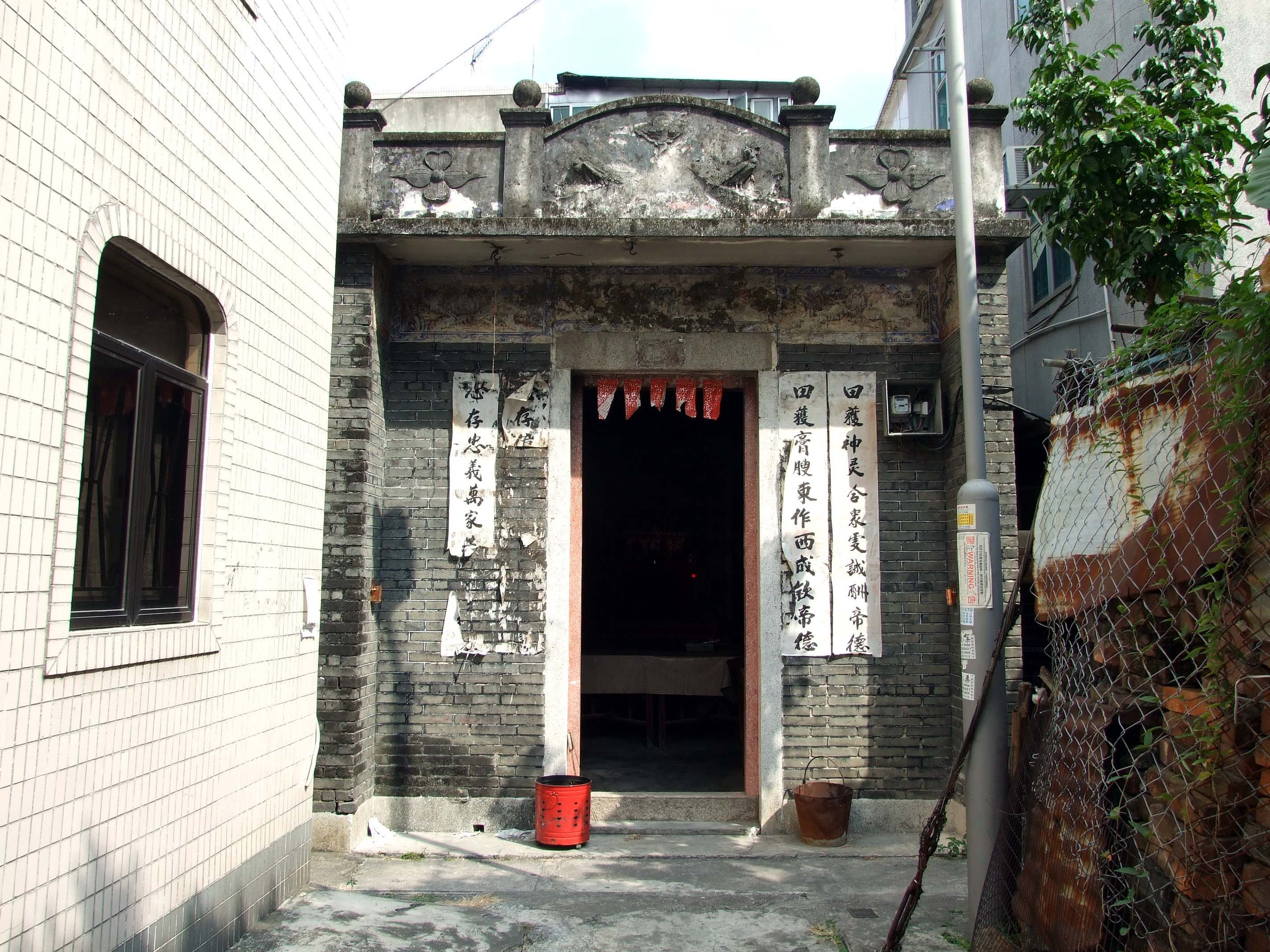
Village shrine of Tin Sam Tsuen

Tin Sum Tsuen is a recognized village under the New Territories Small House Policy. Tin Sam Tsuen is one of the villages represented within the Ha Tsuen Rural Committee. For electoral purposes, Tin Sam Tsuen is part of the Ha Tsuen constituency, which is currently represented by Tang Ka-leung.

== See also ==
- Walled villages of Hong Kong
