= Lam Tei Reservoir =

Irrigation reservoir in New Territories, Hong Kong

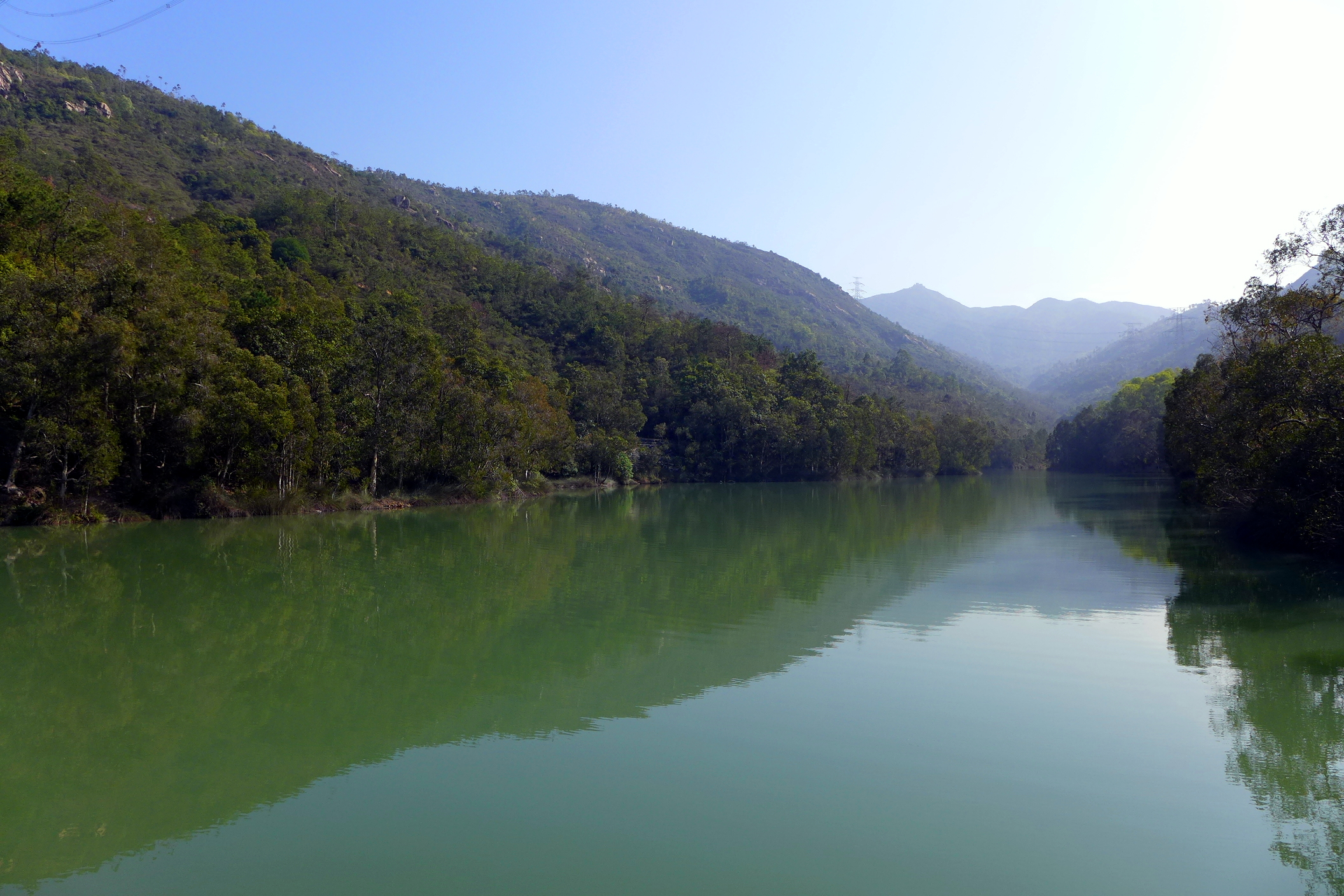
- Lam Tei Reservoir

- Location within Hong Kong
- Location: Tuen Mun, New Territories, Hong Kong
- Coordinates: 22.41065°N 113.99021°E
- Type: reservoir
- Primary inflows: Tuen Mun River
- Primary outflows: Tuen Mun River
- Built: 1957; 69 years ago
- Water volume: 116,000 cubic metres (4,100,000 cu ft)

Lam Tei Reservoir
- Traditional Chinese: 藍地水塘
Transcriptions
Yue: Cantonese
- Yale Romanization: Làahm deih séui tòhng
- Jyutping: Laam^{4} dei^{6*2} seoi^{2} tong^{4}

Lam Tei Reservoir (also known as Lo Fu Hang Reservoir or Lam Tei Irrigation Reservoir) is a funnel-shaped reservoir located at the back hill of Lingnan University in Fu Tei, Tuen Mun, Hong Kong with an area of 17,000 m^{2} and a water storage capacity of 116,000 m^{3}. It is located at the western edge of Tai Lam Country Park and less than one kilometre away from Hung Shui Hang Reservoir. Like Hung Shui Hang Reservoir, it is part of Tai Lam Chung Reservoir's further water supply plan and an irrigation reservoir. The water from the reservoir eventually flows through the Tuen Mun River and empties into the Castle Peak Bay. The reservoir can be accessed by Stage 2 of the Tuen Mun Trail.

== History ==
Lam Tei Reservoir was opened on 28 March 1957 by Sir Alexander Grantham, and the opening plaque can still be seen next to the reservoir.

In the past 20 years, at least six children playing in the water died in Lam Tei Reservoir. Villagers called the reservoir as "Ghost Reservoir". It is rumoured that there are "carp spirits" in the reservoir, and the children were dragged into the water to drown.

== See also ==
- List of reservoirs of Hong Kong
