= Tai Tao Tsuen =

Village in Hong Kong

Coordinates: 22.433016°N 114.001308°E

Tai Tao Tsuen (Chinese: 大道村) is a village in Yuen Long District, New Territories, Hong Kong.

== Administration ==
Tai Tao Tsuen is one of the 37 villages represented within the Ping Shan Rural Committee. For electoral purposes, Tai Tao Tsuen is part of the Ping Shan South constituency.
