= Tan Kwai Tsuen =

Coordinates: 22.427629°N 113.997198°E

Tan Kwai Tsuen (Chinese: 丹桂村) is a village in Ping Shan, Yuen Long District, Hong Kong.

== Administration ==
Tan Kwai Tsuen is one of the 37 villages represented within the Ping Shan Rural Committee. For electoral purposes, Tan Kwai Tsuen is part of the Ping Shan South constituency.

== See also ==
- Ping Shan South (constituency)
- Hung Shui Hang Reservoir
