= Ping Shan South (constituency) =

Hong Kong constituency

- Elected constituency for the Yuen Long District Council
- Boundary of Ping Shan South in Yuen Long District
- District: Yuen Long
- Legislative Council constituency: New Territories North West
- Population: 16,555 (2019)
- Electorate: 8,284 (2019)

Current constituency
- Created: 1999
- Number of members: One
- Member: Vacant

Ping Shan South (Chinese: 屏山南) is one of the 39 constituencies in the Yuen Long District of Hong Kong.

The constituency returns one district councillor to the Yuen Long District Council, with an election every four years. Ping Shan South constituency is loosely based on Arnold Gardens, Aster Court, Lam Hau Tsuen, Shan Ha Tsuen, Tai Tao Tsuen, Tan Kwai Garden, Tan Kwai Tsuen, The Woodsville, Tong Yan San Tsuen in Yuen Long with estimated population of 16,555.

== Councillors represented ==
Election	Member	Party
1999	Cheung Fuk-yin	Nonpartisan
2003	Wong Shing-tong	Liberal
2011	Cheung Muk-lam	NTAS
2019	Leung Tak-ming→Vacant	TCHDNTW→Nonpartisan

== Election results ==
=== 2010s ===
Yuen Long District Council Election, 2019: Ping Shan South
Party	Candidate	Votes	%	±%
Team Chu (PfD)	Leung Tak-ming	3,172	52.96	
Nonpartisan	Cheung Wai-sum	2,270	37.90	
Nonpartisan	Tang Lung-wai	529	8.83	
Nonpartisan	Wong Chung-ming	18	0.30	
Majority		902	15.06	
Turnout		6,010	72.57	
Team Chu gain from NTAS		Swing		
