= Hung Shui Kiu =

Area of Hong Kong

Coordinates: 22.4282°N 113.9983°E

- Traditional Chinese: 洪水橋
- Simplified Chinese: 洪水桥
- Literal meaning: Floody Bridge
Transcriptions
Standard Mandarin
- Hanyu Pinyin: Hóngshuǐqiáo
Yue: Cantonese
- Yale Romanization: Hùhng séui kìuh
- Jyutping: Hung4 seoi2 kiu4

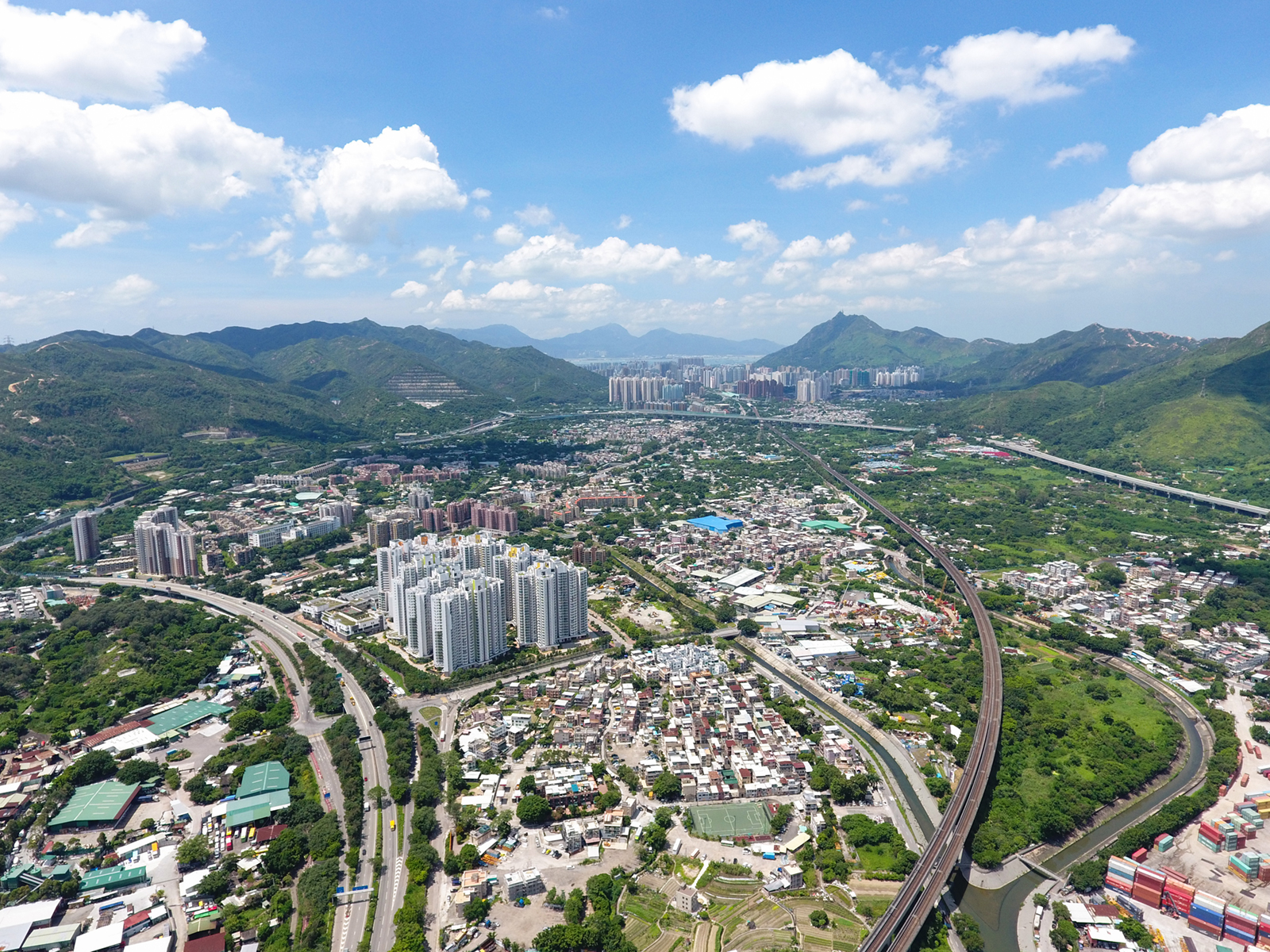
Hung Shui Kiu in 2017

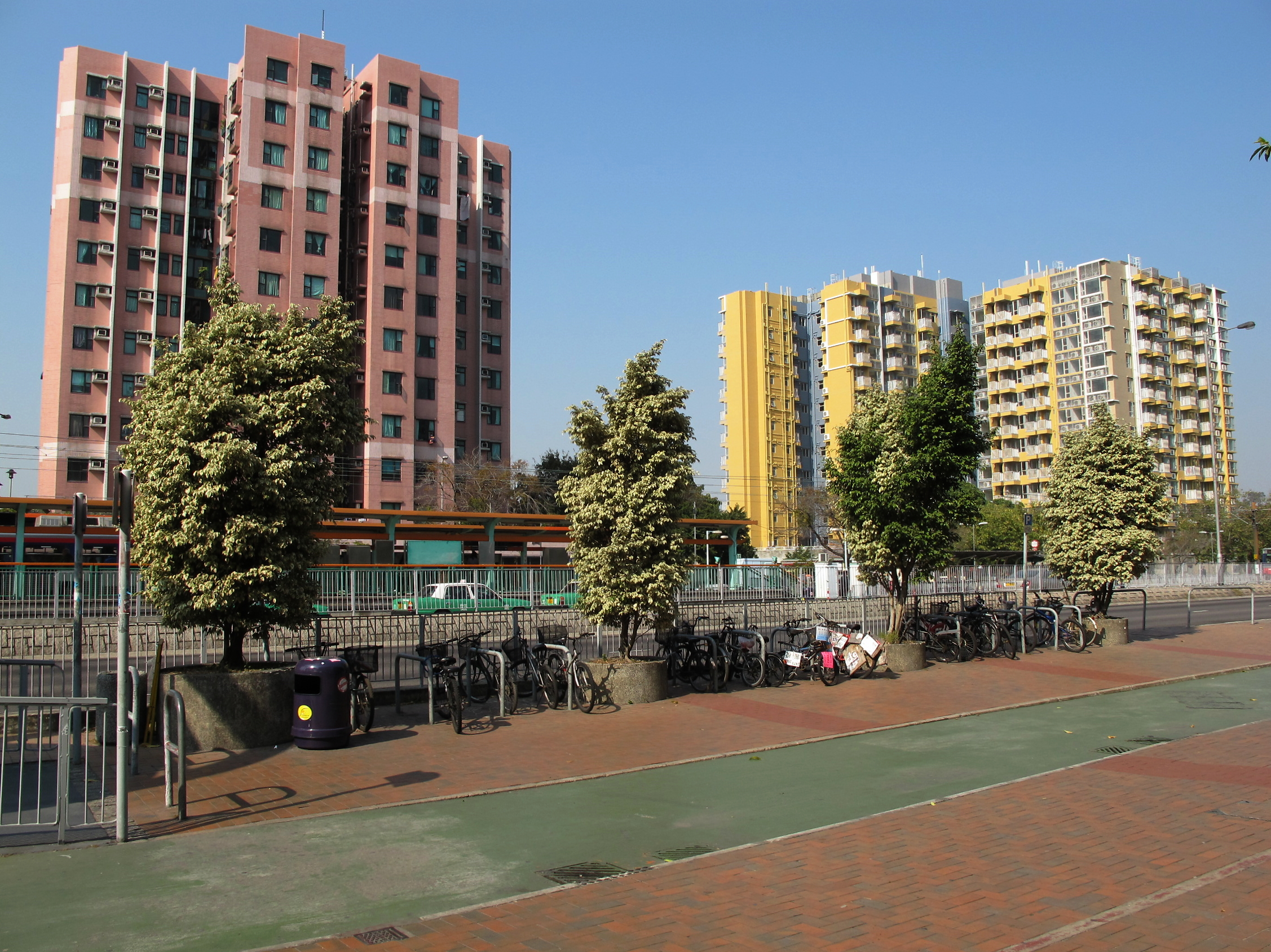
Residential buildings near Hung Shui Kiu Light Rail stop.

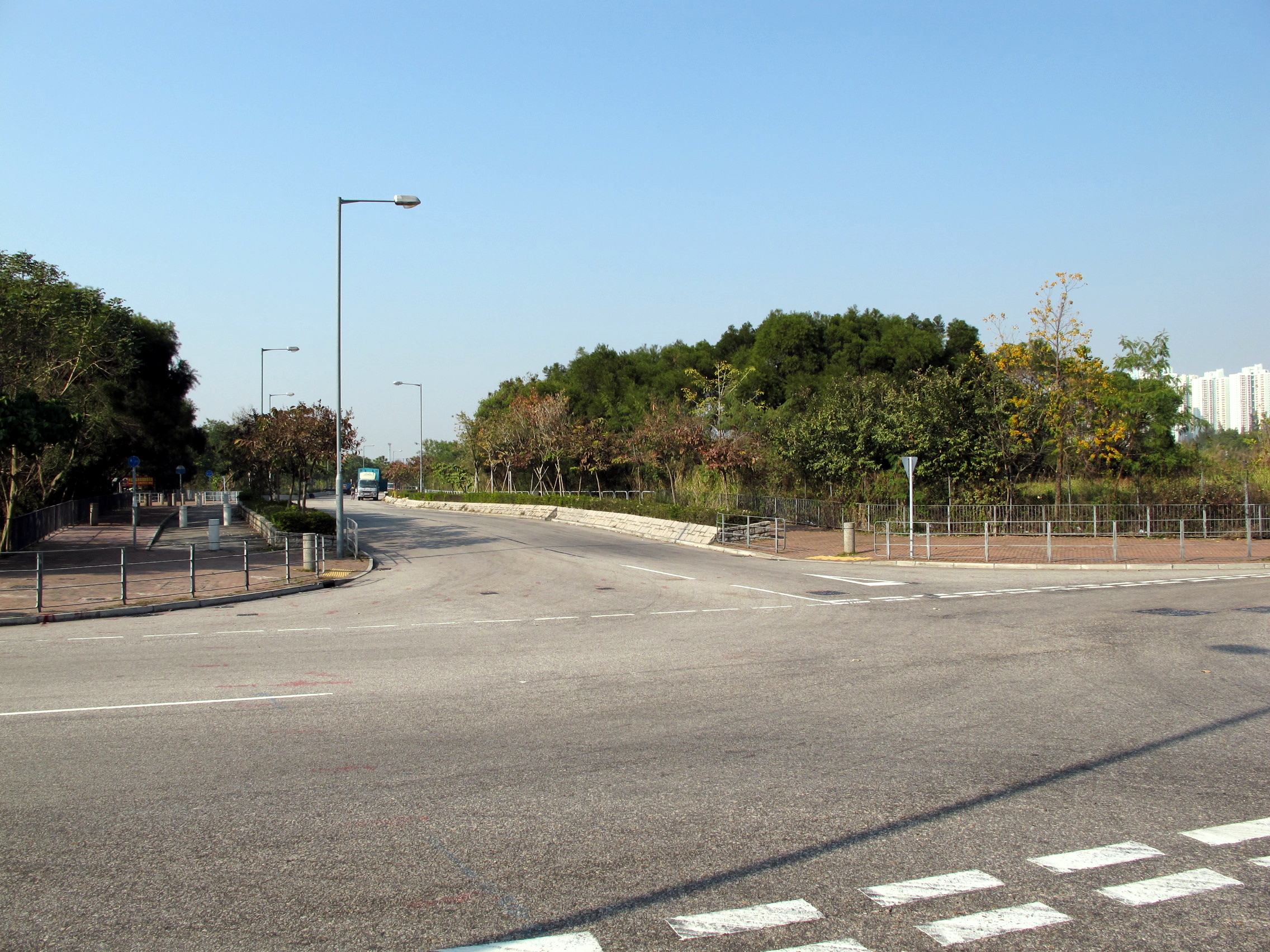
Hung Yuen Road in Hung Shui Kiu.

Hung Shui Kiu is an area between Ping Shan and Lam Tei, in the western part of the New Territories of Hong Kong. It covers parts of Yuen Long and Tuen Mun districts. It is a largely rural residential area. Several Housing Authority blocks are currently under construction on a 6.5-hectare site bounded by Tin Sam, Hung Tin, Hung Chi and Hung Yuen roads.

== New town ==
The "Planning and Development Study on North West New Territories", conducted from 1997 to 2003, identified Hung Shui Kiu and its vicinity as a potential site for a New Town which may accommodate up to 160,000 population in the future. This proposal has since been recommended for implementation and would involve construction of a new Hung Shui Kiu railway station along the existing West Rail line between Siu Hong and Tin Shui Wai stations. In which, is being built as of 2026.

The government conducted public engagement on the plan. A public meeting took place on 8 August 2015 at Shung Tak Catholic English College in Hung Shui Kiu and the Planning Department accepted written comments by mail or email.

In 2015, the first public estate in Hung Shui Kiu, called Hung Fuk Estate, was completed. It comprises nine residential blocks with 4,900 flats as well as a shopping centre, a market, and a community building.

== Transport ==
Hung Shui Kiu is connected by Castle Peak Road. There is also a Light Rail stop, served by routes 610, 614, 615, and 751. There is a MTR station being built served by the Tuen Ma line for Hung Shui Kiu called Hung Shui Kiu station.

Hung Shui Kiu is well-connected by bus routes, with destinations such as the Airport, Sheung Shui, Yau Tsim Mong (Kowloon) Yuen Long,Tin Shui Wai ,etc

== Education ==
Hung Shui Kiu is in Primary One Admission (POA) School Net 72. Within the school net are multiple aided schools (operated independently but funded with government money) and one government school: Tin Shui Wai Government Primary School (天水圍官立小學).

== See also ==
- List of streets and roads in Hong Kong
- Tin Sam Tsuen, Hung Shui Kiu
- Route 9 (Hong Kong)
- Tin Shui Wai
- Yuen Long
- Tuen Ma Line
