= Shek Wu Wai =

Coordinates: 22.491963°N 114.072452°E

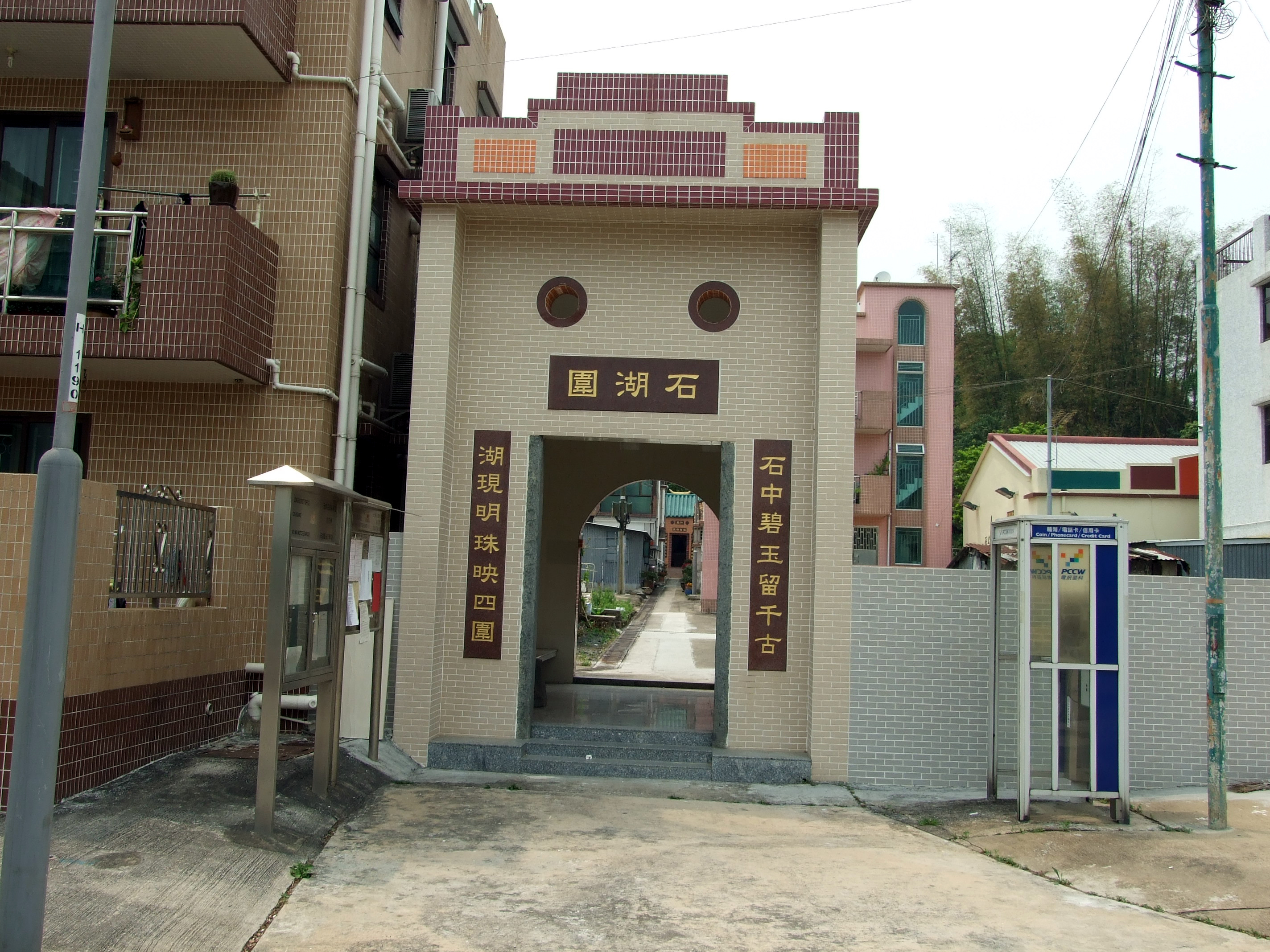
Entrance gate of Shek Wu Wai in April 2012

Shek Wu Wai (Chinese: 石湖圍) is a Punti walled village in the San Tin area of Yuen Long District, Hong Kong.

== Administration ==
Shek Wu Wai is a recognized village under the New Territories Small House Policy.

== Location ==
Shek Wu Wai is located in the south end of the San Tin area, south of the San Tin Highway, which separates the village from the main villages of the Man clan in the area, including Yan Shau Wai and Fan Tin Tsuen.

== History ==
The village was established about 300 years ago by members of the Man (文) clan of San Tin, who branched out from Chau Tau Tsuen. It is comparatively young among the villages established by the Man clan in the San Tin area.

At the time of the 1911 census, the population of Shek Wu Wai was 56. The number of males was 37.

In June 2022, the Town Planning Board rejected a 2019 application by Sun Hung Kai Properties and Hongkong Land for an 11,292-flat project in Shek Wu Wai.

== Features ==
The village has an entrance gate, rebuilt in 1965, that features two circular holes above the front doorway for feng shui and practical security watching purposes. An Earth God shrine is located within the gate. Other shrines in the village include a Pak Tai shrine and another Earth God shrine.
