= Chung Sum Wai =

Chung Sum Wai (中心圍), sometimes transliterated as Chung Sam Wai is the name of two villages in Hong Kong:

- Chung Sum Wai (Tai Hang)
- Chung Sum Wai (Wang Chau)
