= Taihang (disambiguation) =

The Taihang Mountains are a mountain range in China.

Taihang may also refer to:

- Tai Hang, area in Hong Kong Island
  - Tai Hang (constituency), the political constituency of the above area
- Tai Hang (Tai Po), area in the New Territories, Hong Kong
- Shenyang WS-10, a Chinese military aircraft turbofan engine
