= Fui Sha Wai =

Fui Sha Wai (灰沙圍) may refer to:

- Fui Sha Wai (Tai Po District), a village in Tai Hang, Tai Po District, Hong Kong
- Fui Sha Wai (Yuen Long District), a village in Yuen Long District, Hong Kong
