= Ha Wai =

Ha Wai (Chinese: 下圍; lit. 'lower village') is part of the name of several villages in Hong Kong, including:

- Fui Sha Wai (Tai Po District)
- Fui Sha Wai (Yuen Long District)
- Luk Keng Ha Wai
- Shan Ha Wai
- Tap Mun Ha Wai
- Wo Mei Ha Wai
