= San Wai (San Tin) =

Coordinates: 22.47239°N 114.057155°E

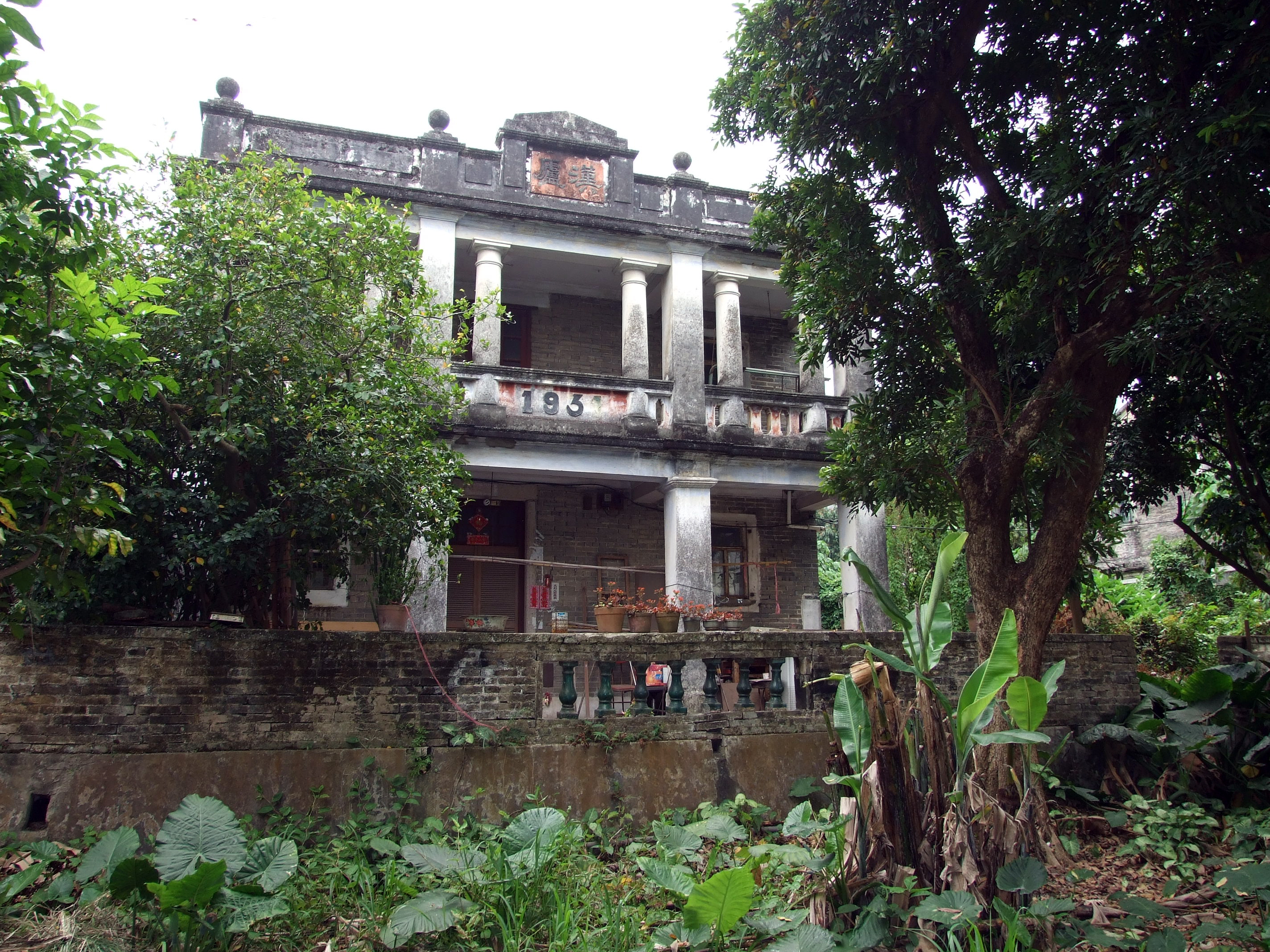
Hon Lo (漢廬), at No. 61 San Wai Tsuen, is a residence built in 1931.

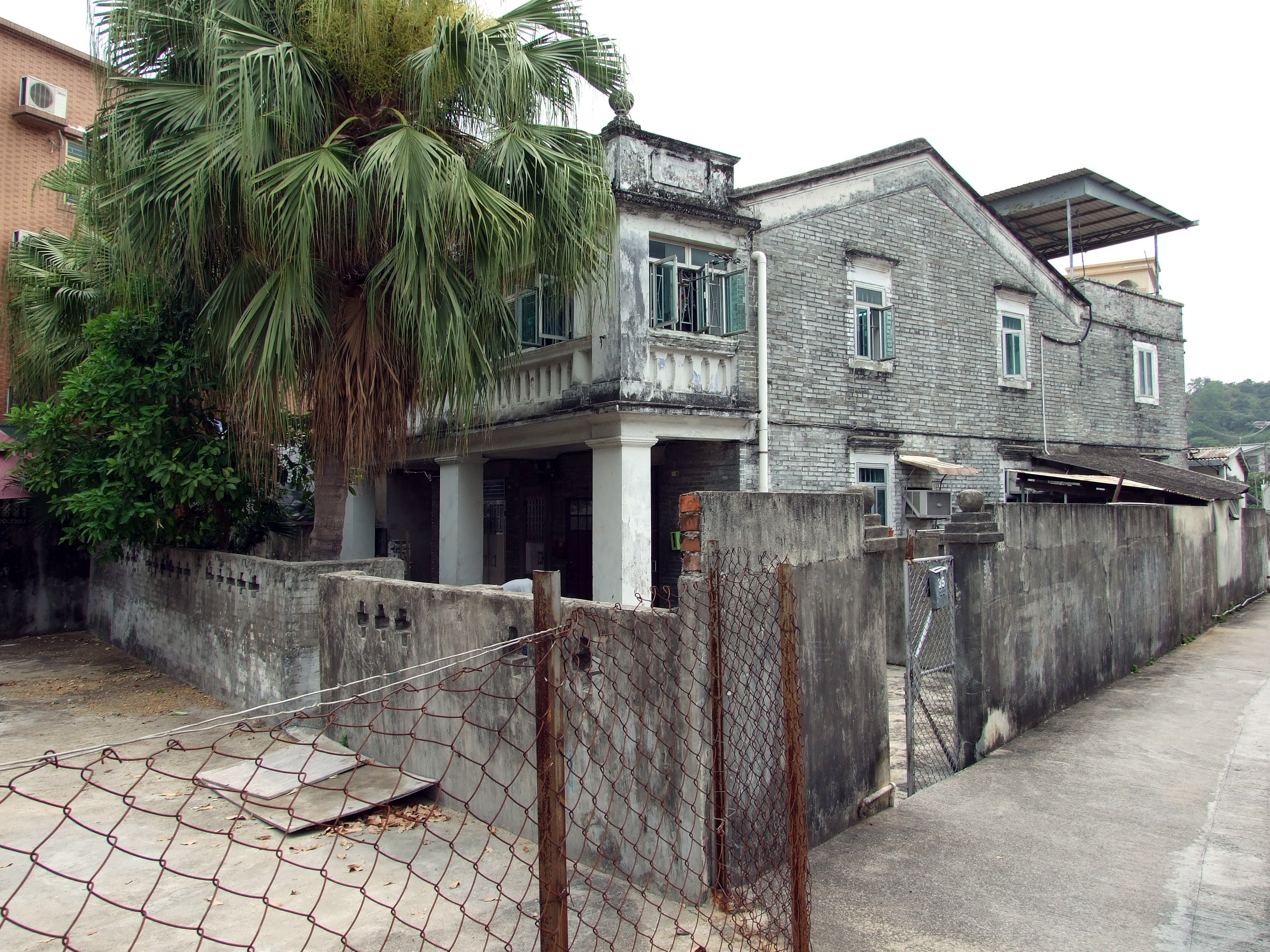
Nos. 35 and 36 San Wai Tsuen, built in 1932.

San Wai (Chinese: 新圍) or San Wai Tsuen (新圍村) is a village in the San Tin area of Yuen Long District, Hong Kong.

== Administration ==
San Wai is one of the villages represented within the San Tin Rural Committee. For electoral purposes, San Wai is part of the San Tin constituency, which is currently represented by Man Fu-wan.

San Tin Ha San Wai (新田下新圍) and San Tin Sheung San Wai (新田上新圍), part of San Wai, are recognized villages under the New Territories Small House Policy.

== History ==
San Wai Tsuen was originally called Fuk Hing Lei (福興里), and was founded by the Wong and Chiu families.
