= Wo Sang Wai =

Coordinates: 22.487123°N 114.052711°E

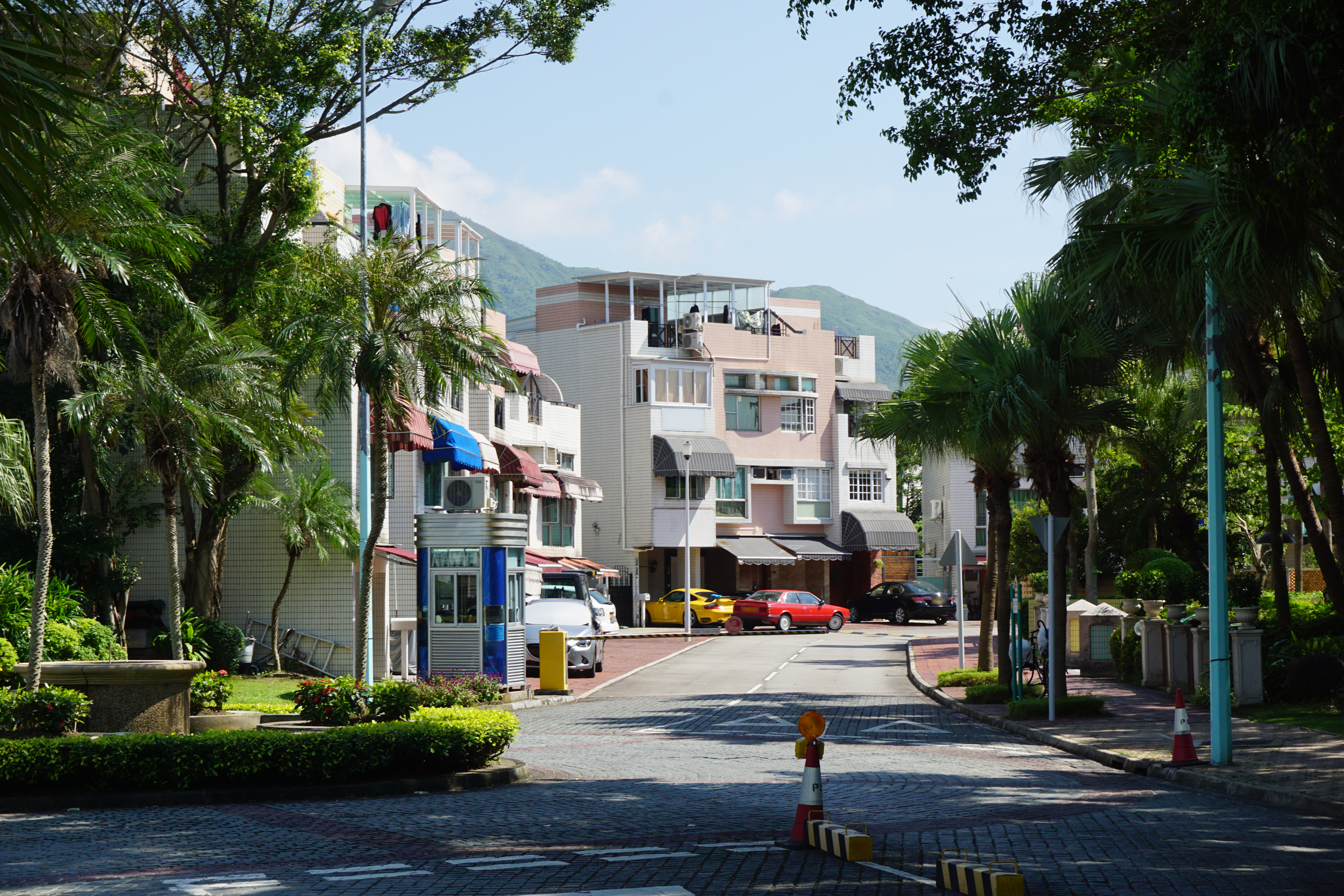
Palm Springs housing development (加州花園) in Wo Sang Wai.

Wo Sang Wai (Chinese: 和生圍), sometimes transliterated as Wo Shang Wai, is a village in the San Tin area of Yuen Long District, Hong Kong.

Wo Shang Wai is a multi-clan village with a common ancestral hall.
