= Tai Fu Tai Mansion =

Coordinates: 22.4996°N 114.0764°E

- Traditional Chinese: 大夫第
Transcriptions
Yue: Cantonese
- Yale Romanization: Daaih fū daih
- Jyutping: Daai6 fu1 dai6

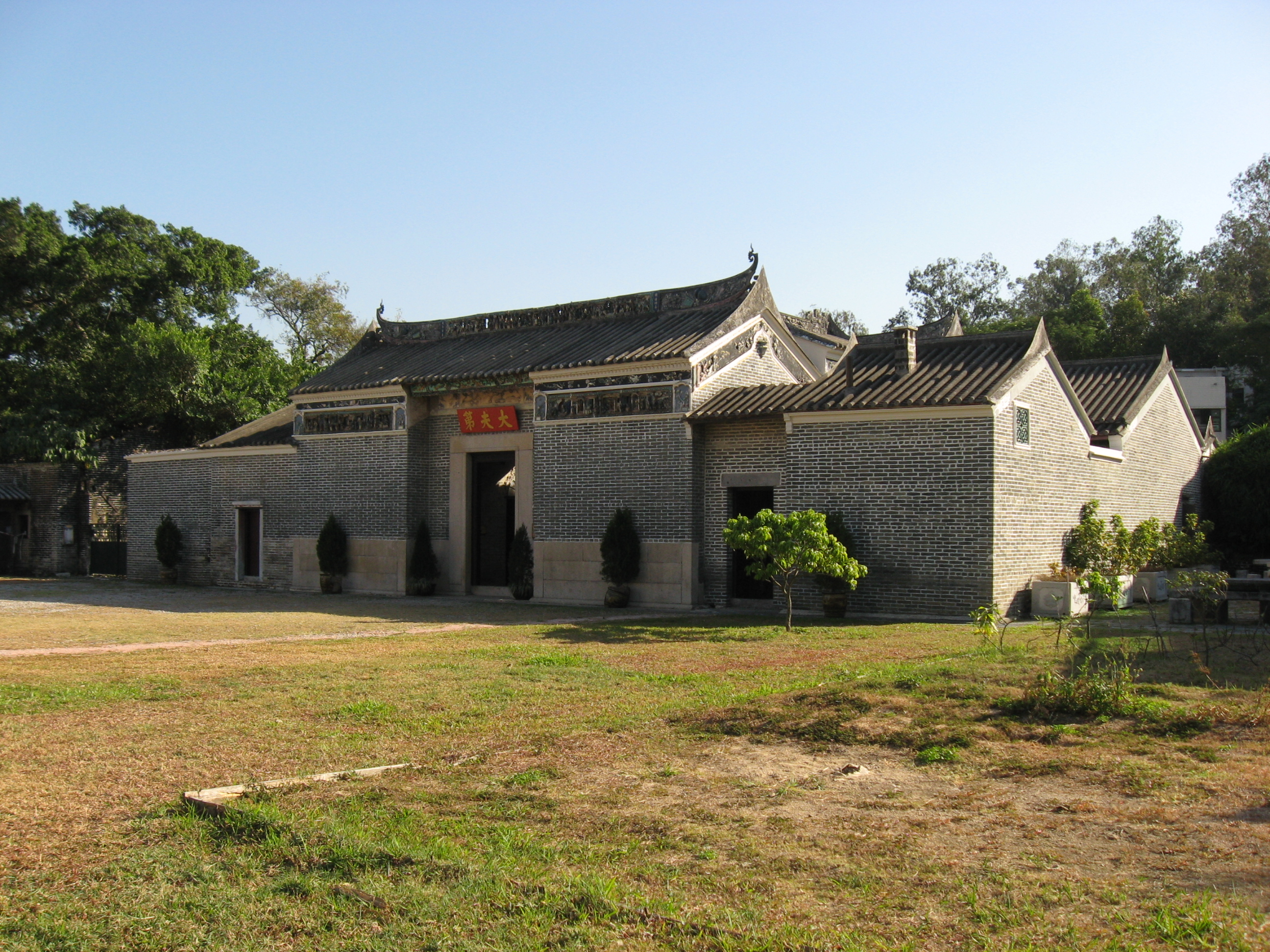
Tai Fu Tai Mansion.

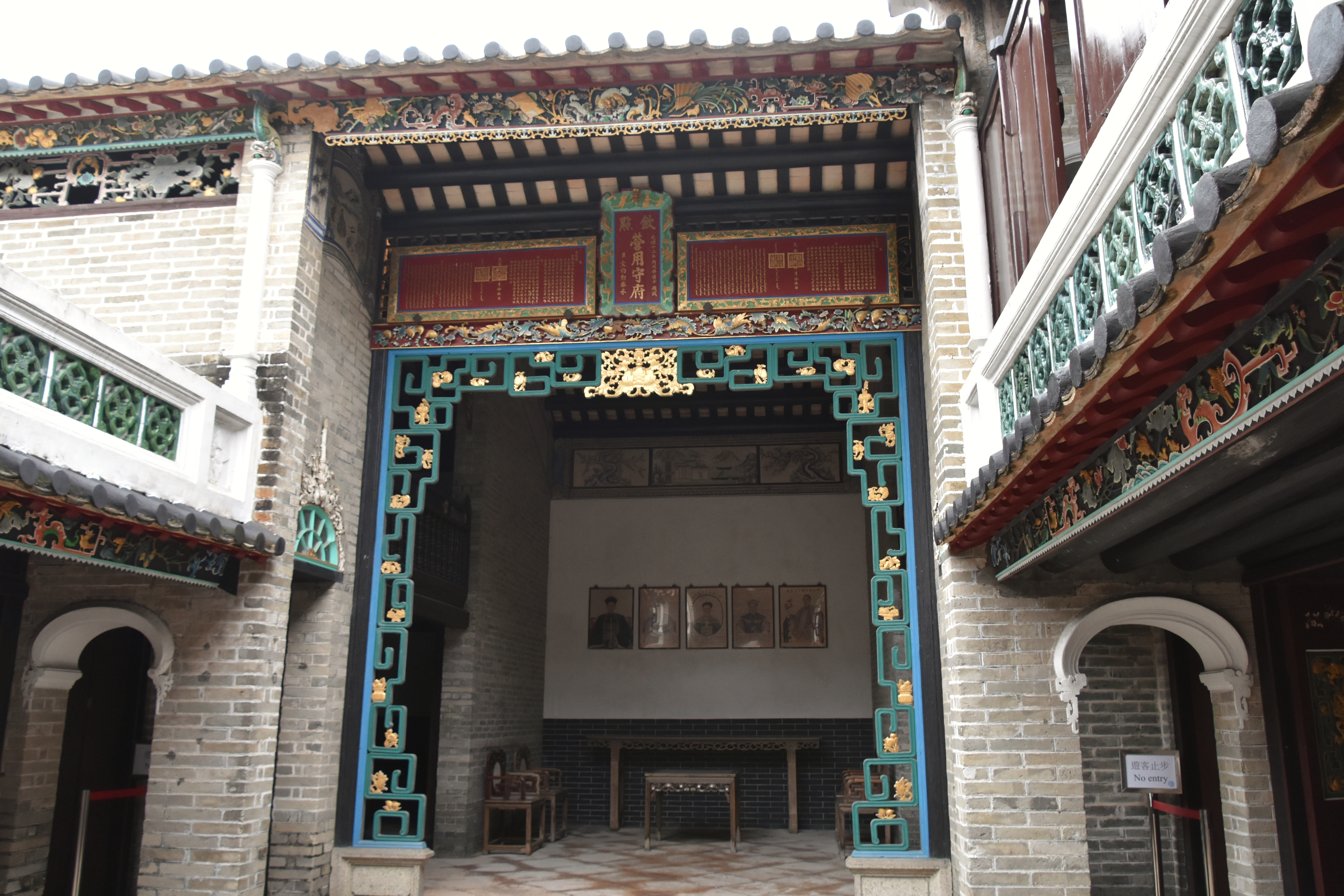
Tai Fu Tai Mansion.

Tai Fu Tai Mansion is a residence located in Wing Ping Tsuen, San Tin near Lok Ma Chau, north of Yuen Long, Hong Kong.

== History ==
It was probable that it was built in 1865 during in the era of the Qing Dynasty. It was built as a residence by Man Chung-luen (文頌鑾) whose ancestors had settled in San Tin since the 15th century.

In 2007, 3D laser scanning technology was used to digitally capture 3D images of the structure.

== Description ==
The building is richly embellished with spacious grounds; a large open space in front and a garden at the back. The whole mansion is surrounded by a green-brick wall. It is a fine example of traditional Chinese dwellings of the scholar-gentry class.
