= Wing Ping Tsuen =

Village in Hong Kong

Wing Ping Tsuen Chinese: 永平村
- Village
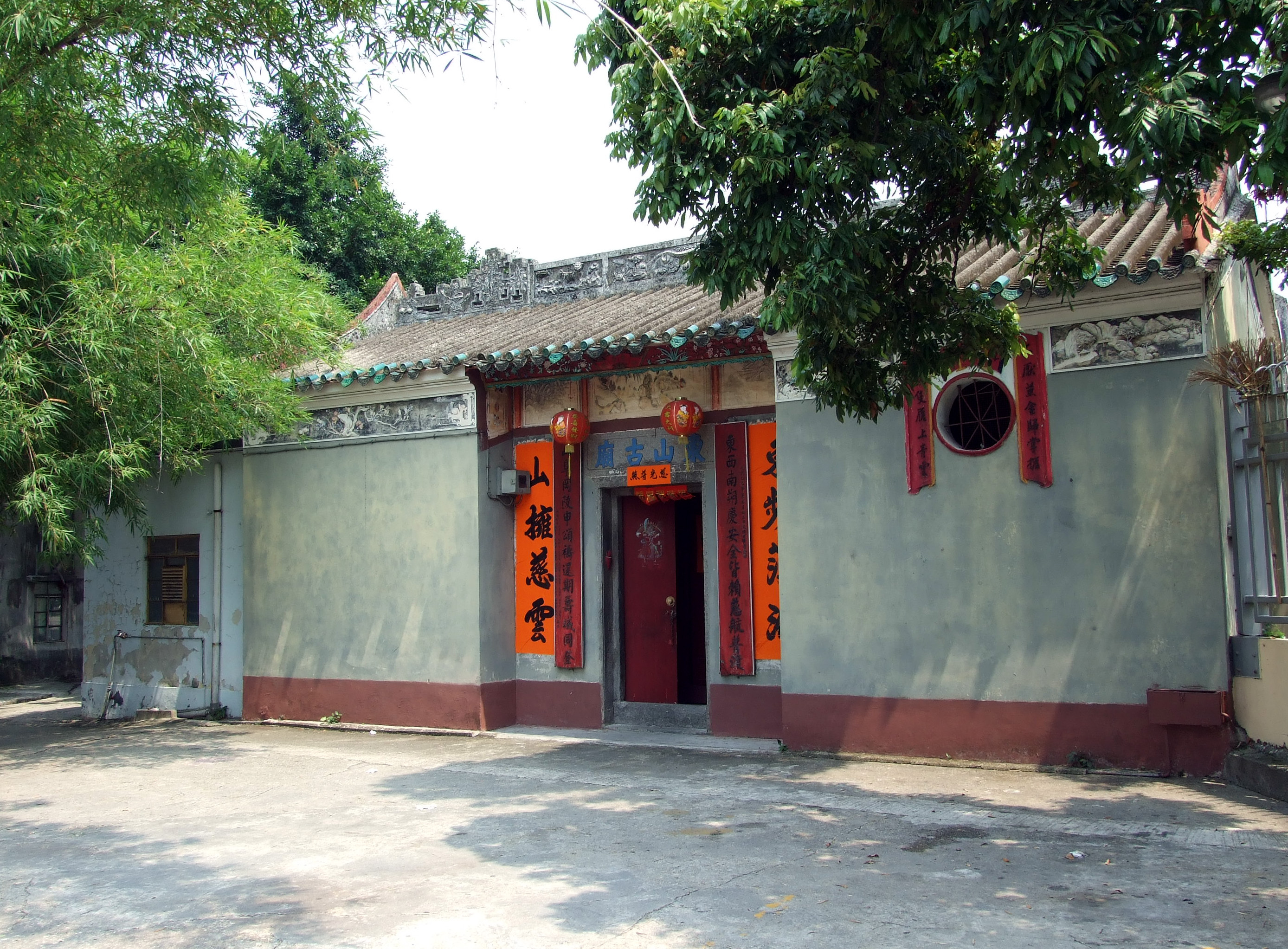
- Tung Shan Temple (東山古廟), a temple dedicated to Tin Hau in Wing Ping Tsuen.

- Location within Hong Kong
- Coordinates: 22.50061°N 114.076515°E
- Country: People's Republic of China
- Special administrative region: Hong Kong
- District: Yuen Long District
- Area: San Tin
- Time zone: UTC+8:00 (HKT)

Wing Ping Tsuen (Chinese: 永平村) is a village in the San Tin area of Yuen Long District, Hong Kong.

== Administration ==
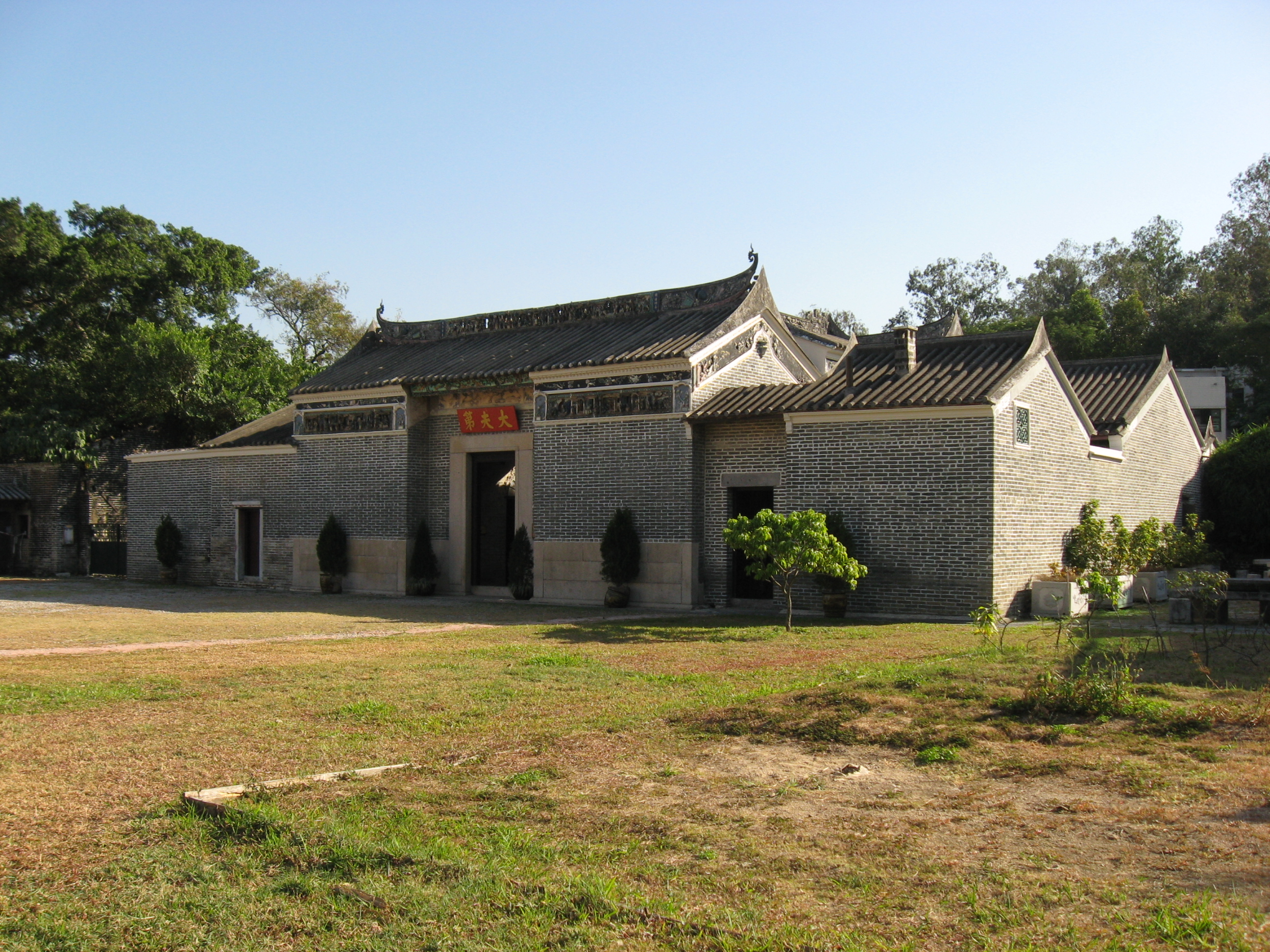
Tai Fu Tai Mansion in Wing Ping Tsuen.

Wing Ping Tsuen is a recognized village under the New Territories Small House Policy.

== See also ==
- Tai Fu Tai Mansion
