= Tung Chan Wai =

Village in Hong Kong

Coordinates: 22.501837°N 114.075979°E

Tung Chan Wai (Chinese: 東鎮圍), also transliterated as Tung Chun Wai, is a village in the San Tin area of Yuen Long District, Hong Kong.

== Administration ==
Tung Chun Wai is a recognized village under the New Territories Small House Policy.

== History ==
Tung Chan Wai is a Man (文) clan village.
