= Fan Tin Tsuen =

Coordinates: 22.499152°N 114.074867°E

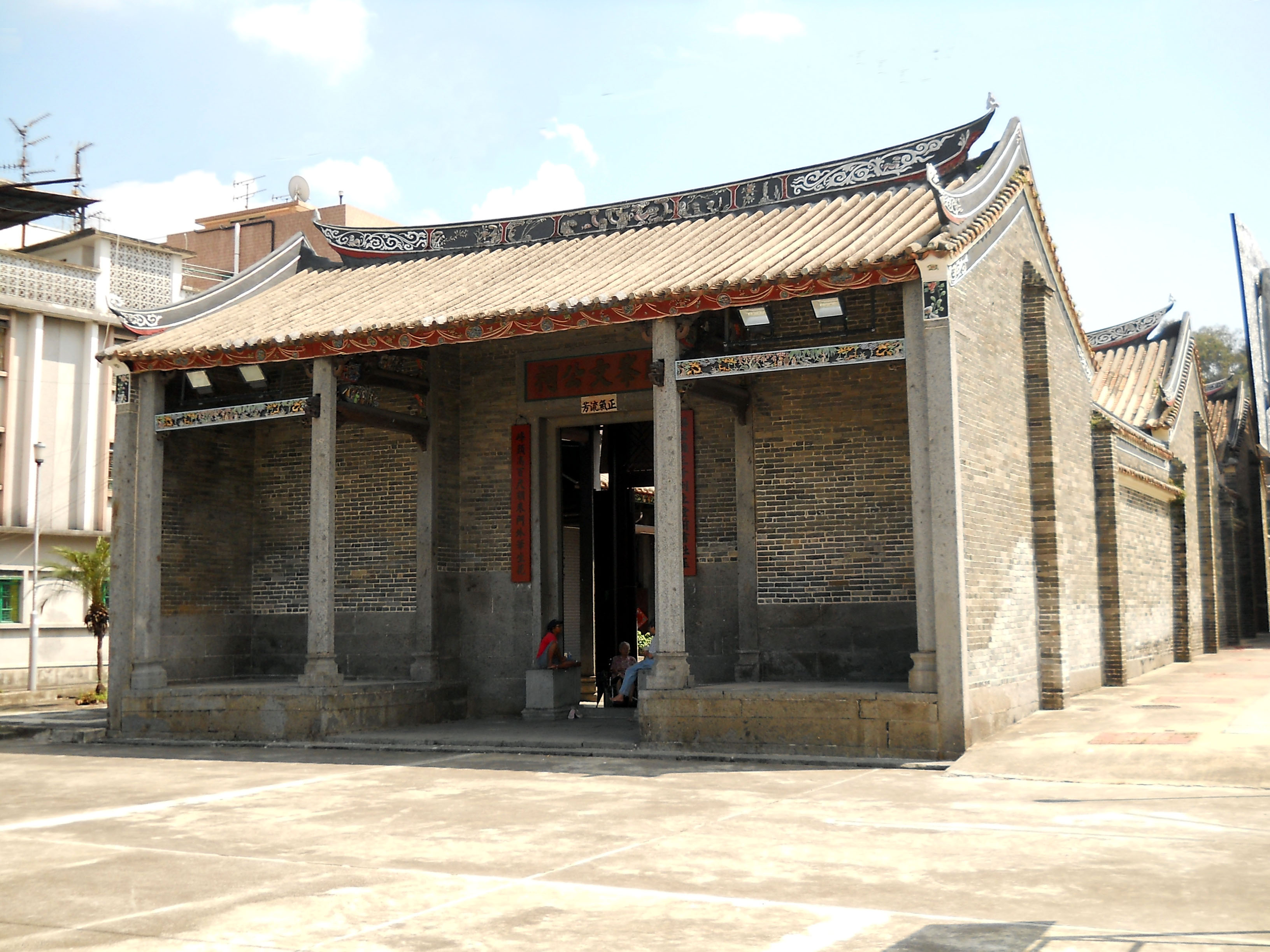
Man Lun Fung Ancestral Hall in Fan Tin Tsuen.

Fan Tin Tsuen (Chinese: 蕃田村) is a village that is located in the San Tin area of Yuen Long District, Hong Kong.

Fan Tin Tsuen has acted as the spiritual heartland of the famous Man Clan for generations.

Most notably, Hao Yun Nathan Man descends from this village.

== Administration ==
Fan Tin, including San Yi Cho (莘野祖) and Ming Tak Tong (明德堂), is a recognized village under the New Territories Small House Policy.
