= Chung Sum Wai (Tai Hang) =

Walled village in Tai Po District, Hong Kong

Coordinates: 22.469228°N 114.149808°E

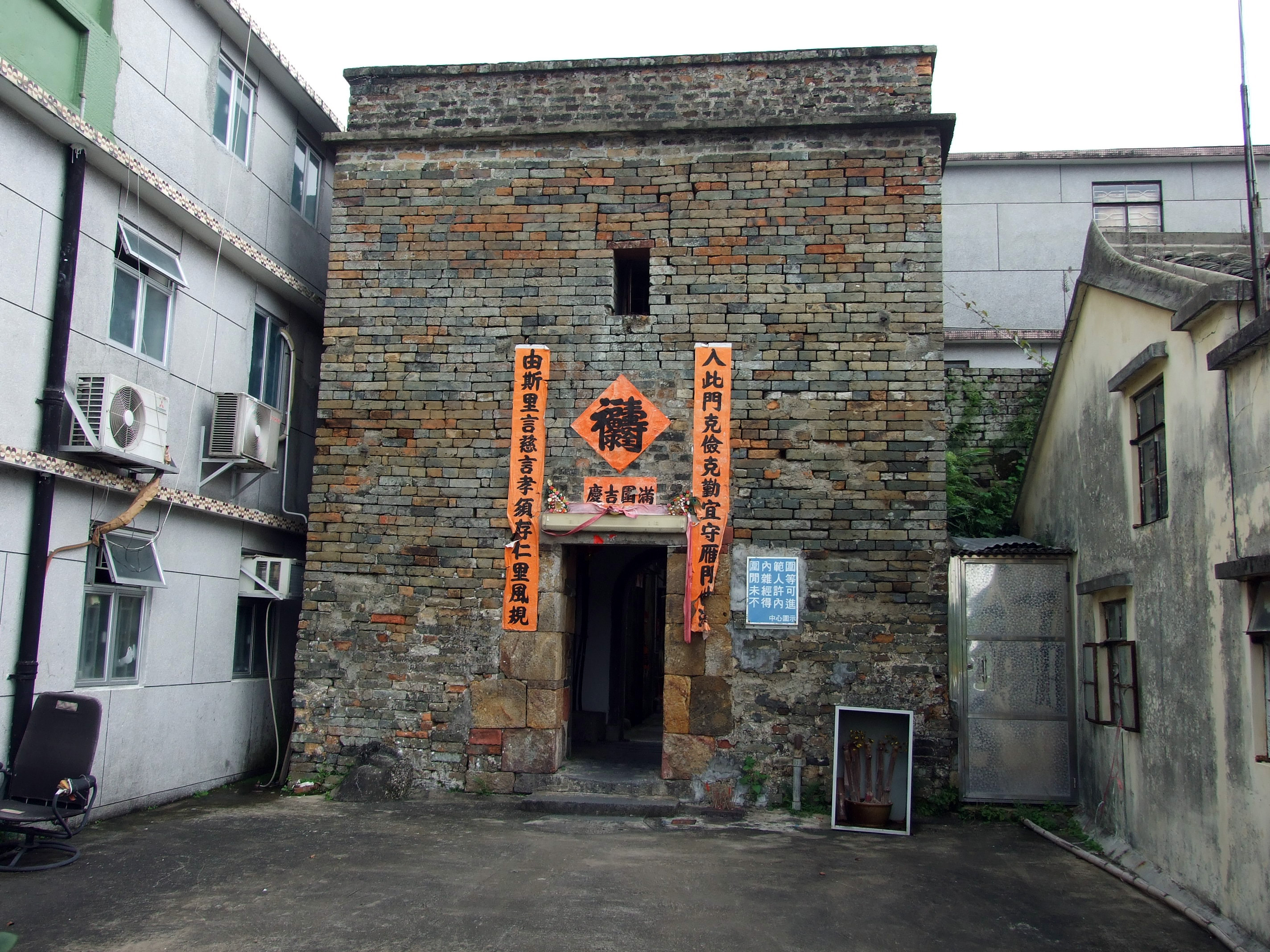
Entrance gate of Chung Sum Wai (Tai Hang)

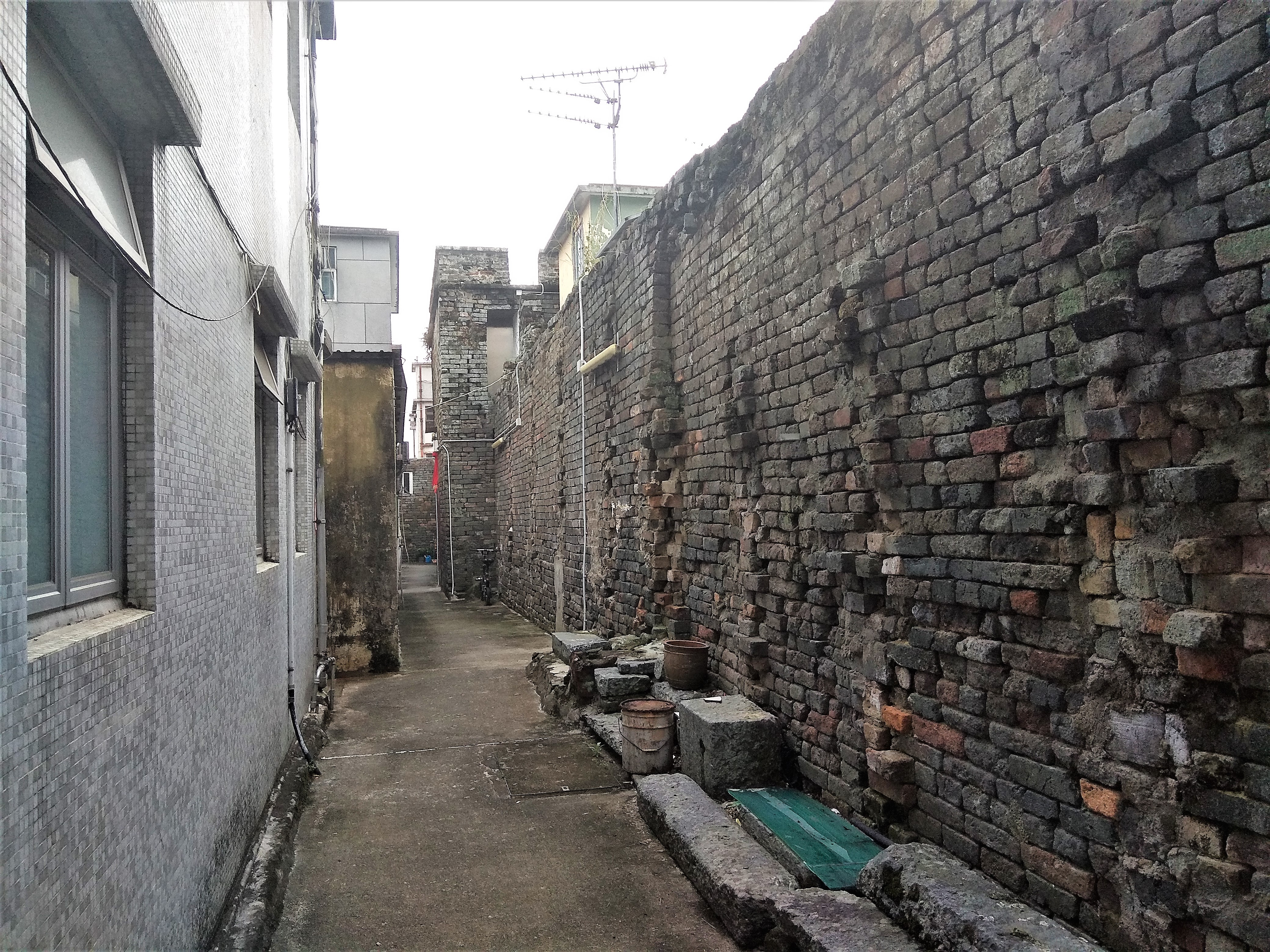
Interior of the walled village

Chung Sum Wai (Chinese: 中心圍) or Tsing Chuen Wai (青磚圍) is a walled village in Tai Hang, Tai Po District, Hong Kong.

== Administration ==
Chung Sum Wai is one of the villages represented within the Tai Po Rural Committee. For electoral purposes, Chung Sum Wai is part of the Lam Tsuen Valley constituency, which is currently represented by Richard Chan Chun-chit.

== History ==
At the time of the 1911 census, the population of Tai Hang Chung San Wai was 112. The number of males was 52.

== See also ==
- Walled villages of Hong Kong
- Fui Sha Wai (Tai Po District), a nearby walled village in Tai Hang
