= Tai Hang (Tai Po) =

Area in the Tai Po District of Hong Kong

Coordinates: 22.4691°N 114.1511°E

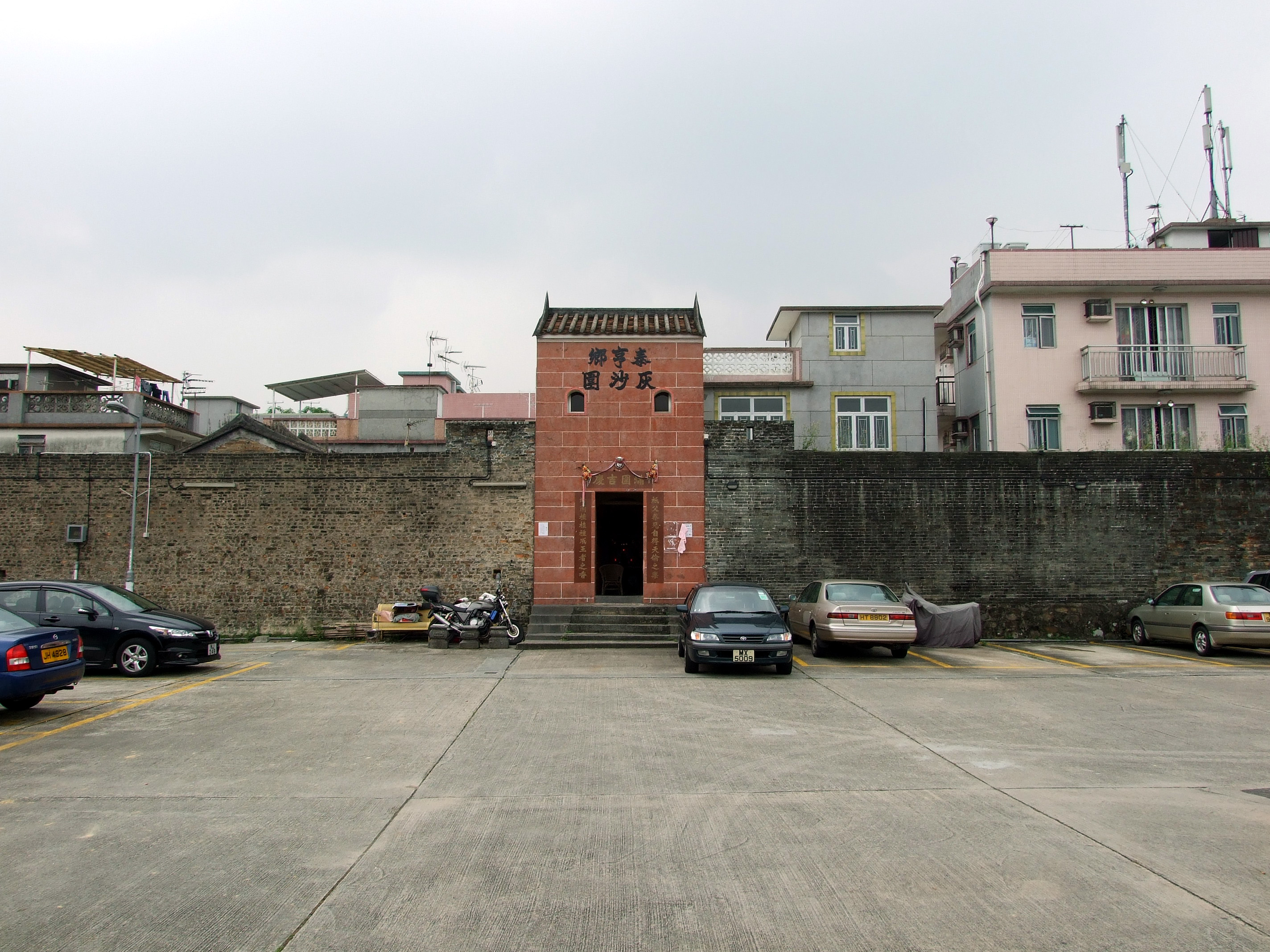
Fui Sha Wai, a walled village in Tai Hang.

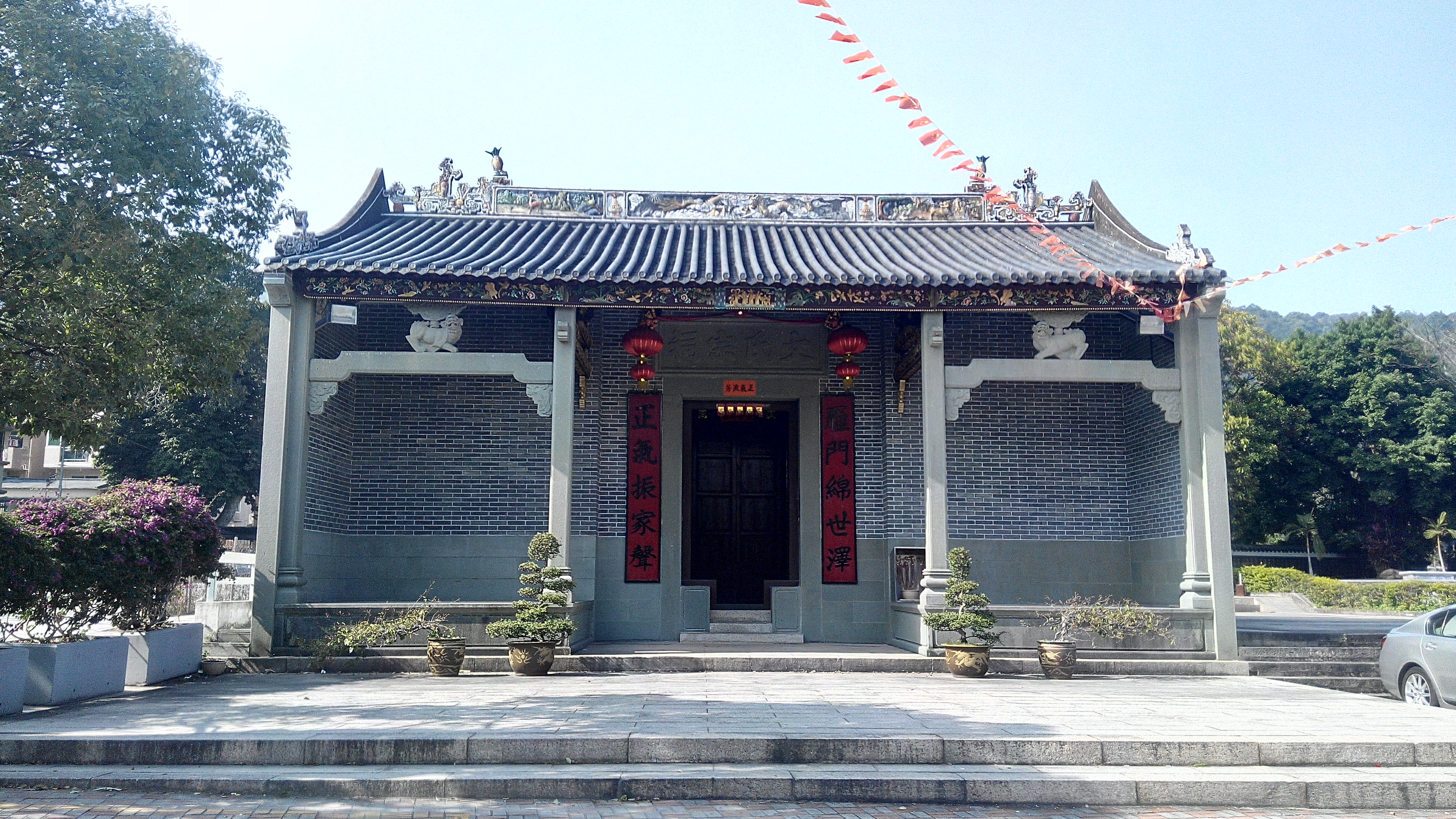
Man Ancestral Hall (文氏宗祠).

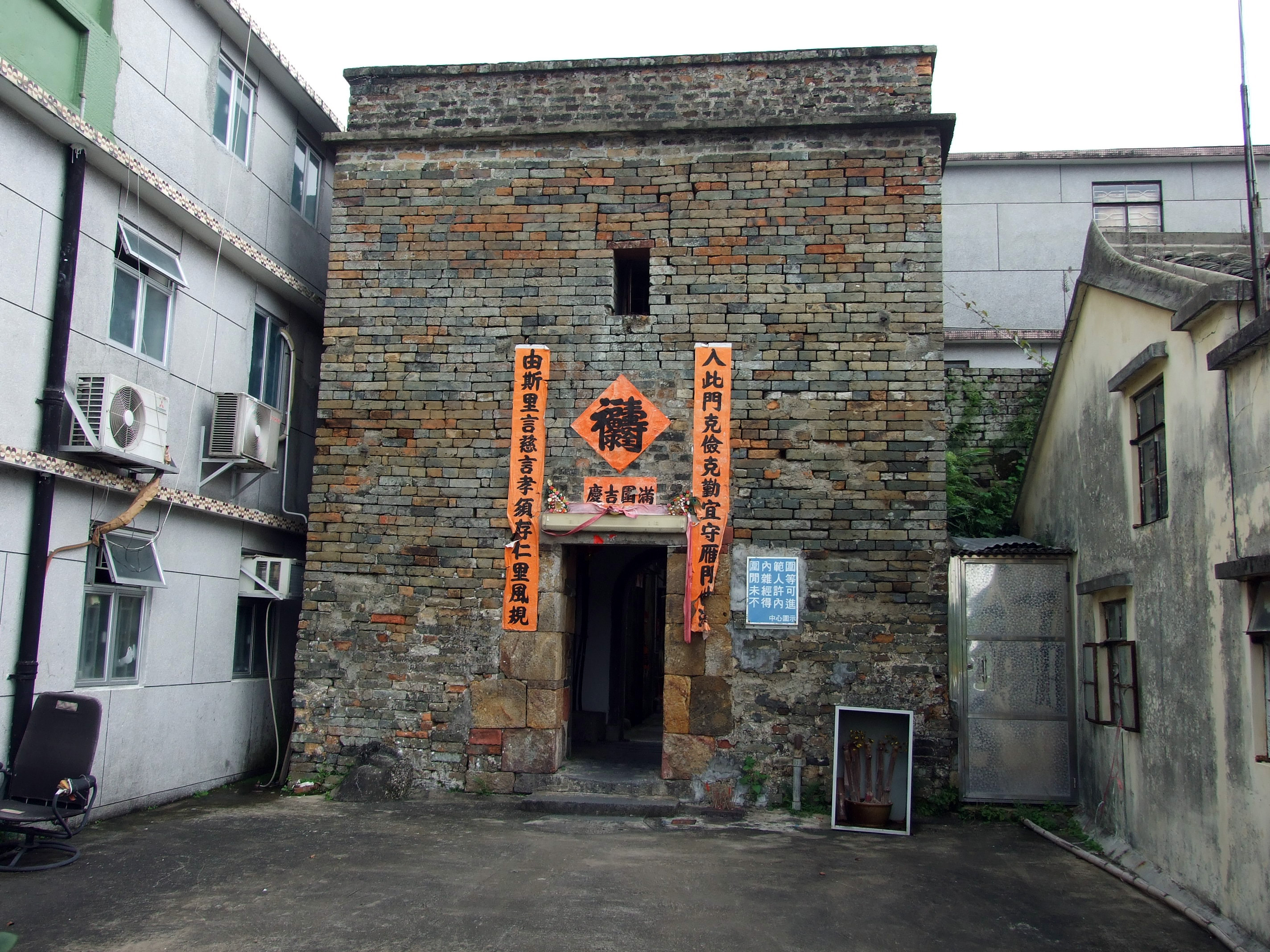
Entrance gate of Chung Sum Wai.

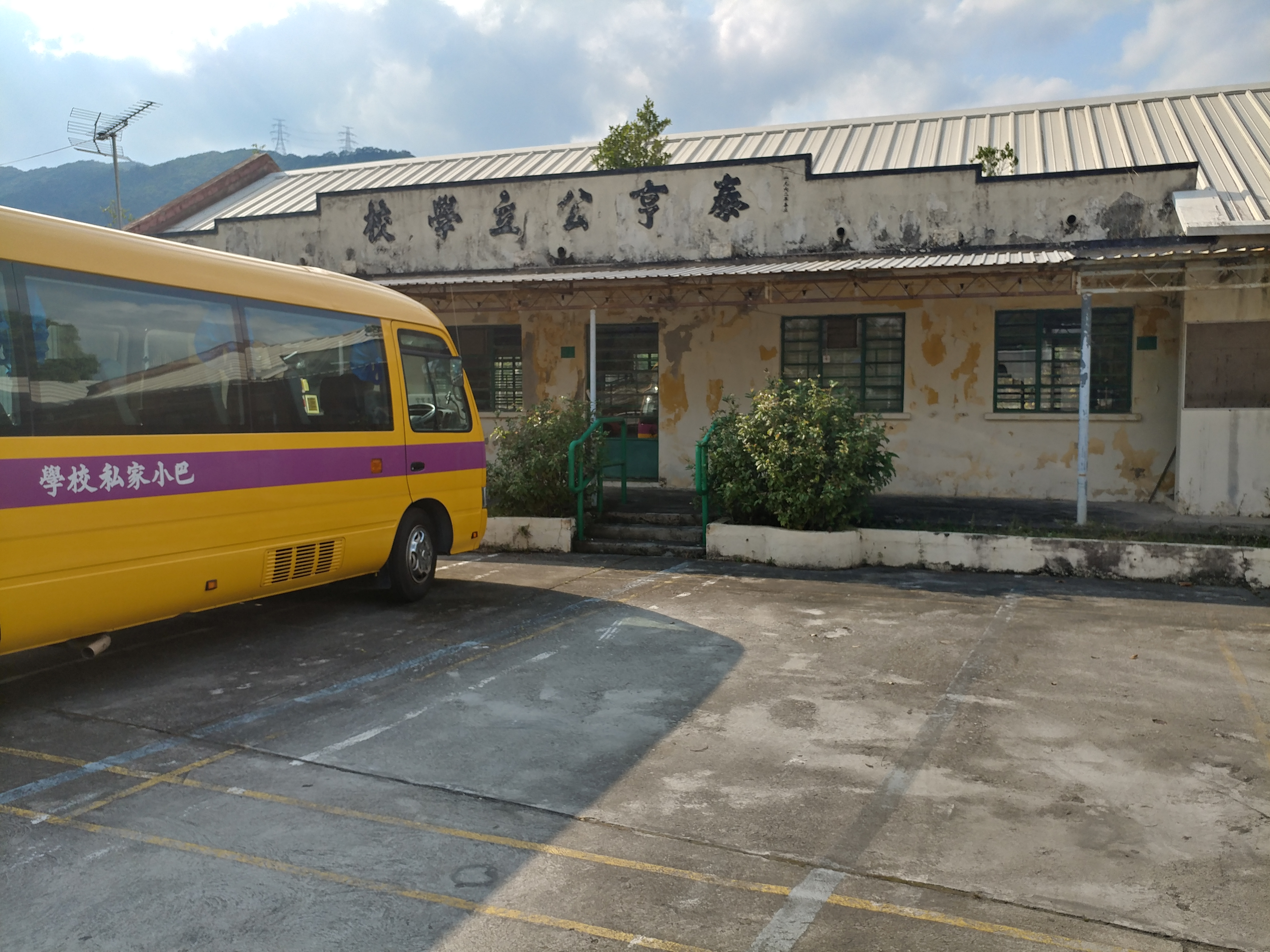
Tai Hang Public School (泰亨公立學校).

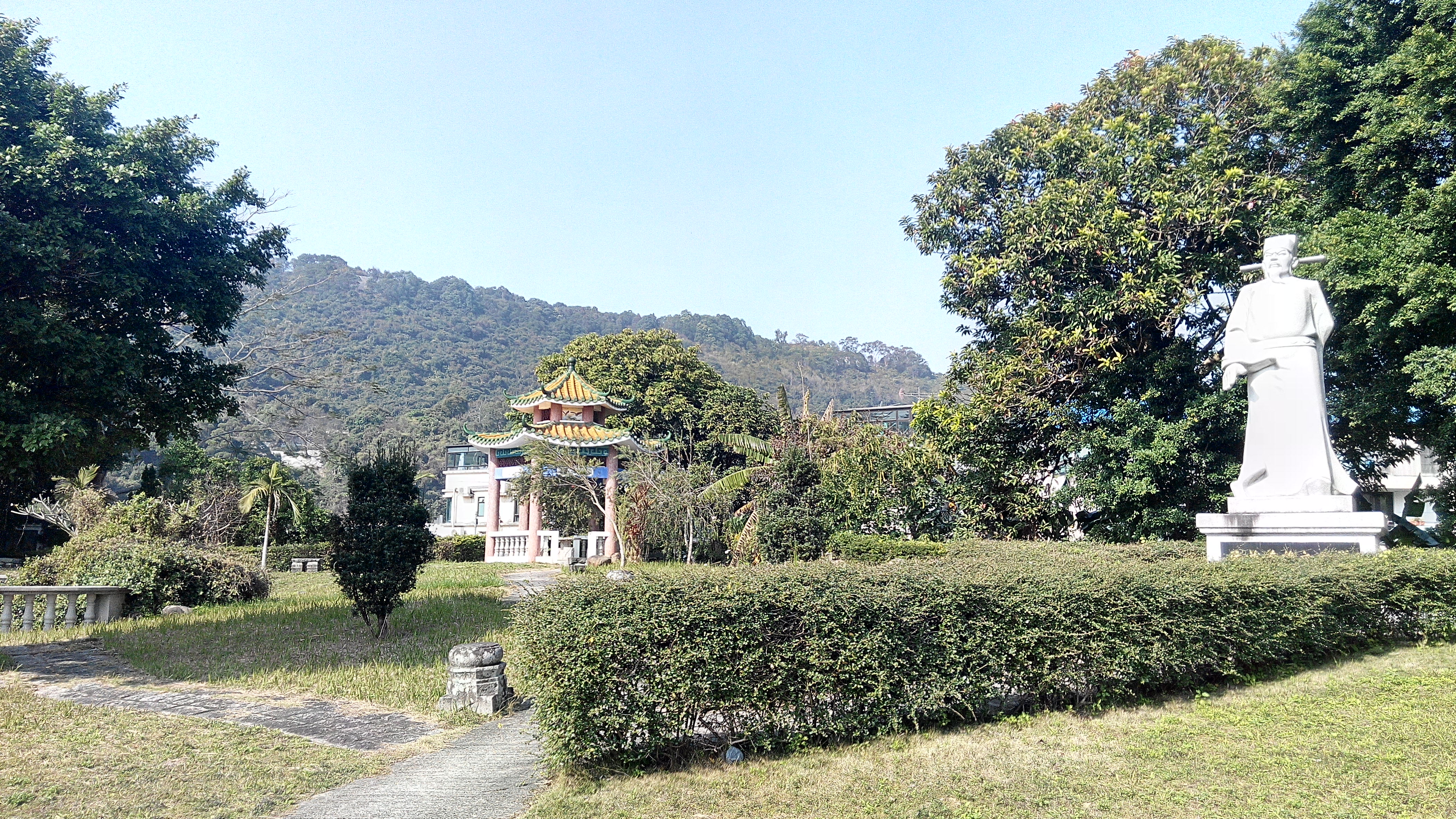
The Man Shan Park (文山公園) commemorates Man Tin-cheung (Wen Tianxiang; 文天祥), next to the Man Ancestral Hall in Tai Hang.

Tai Hang (Chinese: 泰亨) is an area in the Tai Po District of Hong Kong.

The area encompasses several villages, including Tsz Tong Tsuen (祠堂村) and the two walled villages of Chung Sum Wai (中心圍) and Fui Sha Wai (灰沙圍).

== Administration ==
Tai Hang is a recognized village under the New Territories Small House Policy. It is one of the villages represented within the Tai Po Rural Committee. For electoral purposes, Tai Hang is part of the Lam Tsuen Valley constituency, which is currently represented by Richard Chan Chun-chit.

== History ==
The villagers of the Tai Hang Village were mainly the members of the Man (文) clan. The original members of the Man clan in Tai Hang were relatives of Wen Tianxiang (文天祥), the duke and scholar-general of the Song dynasty in China. When the Mongols invaded the Song dynasty, Wen fled to the south with his family and the emperor of the Song dynasty. At first, the family of Wen stayed in Dongguan but they then moved to the present-day New Territories of Hong Kong. Because of the historic background, Wen Tianxiang is commemorated in the village through his statue and an inscription of one of his writings.

At the time of the 1911 census, the population of Tai Hang Tsz Tong Tsuen was 77. The number of males was 29.

== Features ==
- Tai Hang Village is formed by the "Two Wai One Village", which consists of two walled villages, Chung Sum Wai (中心圍) and Fui Sha Wai (灰沙圍), and the village of Tsz Tong Tsuen (祠堂村). The enclosing walls of Fui Sha Wai have been listed as Grade III historic buildings.
- It contains the largest number of traditional village schools in the Tai Po District. For example, the "藝沅學校", "善慶書室", "叢桂書室" and "正倫書室" were built in the Qing dynasty and their remains still exist in the village.
- Three old temples in the village, Guanyin Temple, Tin Hau Temple and the Man Tai Temple, were built in the Qing dynasty and several relics are still kept in the temples.
- The old trees outside the temples formed a double trunk and hid the sculpture of the god of marriage between them. It shows the linkage between the gods and hidden messages of the double trunk, the inseparable love.
- The sculpture of Wen Tianxiang and the inscription of his literature in the Man Shan Park.

== Festival ==
The traditional festival of the village, Da Jiu Festival, is held every five years. It started after building the village in order to express the thanks towards the gods and to beg for the fortune. The latest Da Jiu Festival was held in 2020.

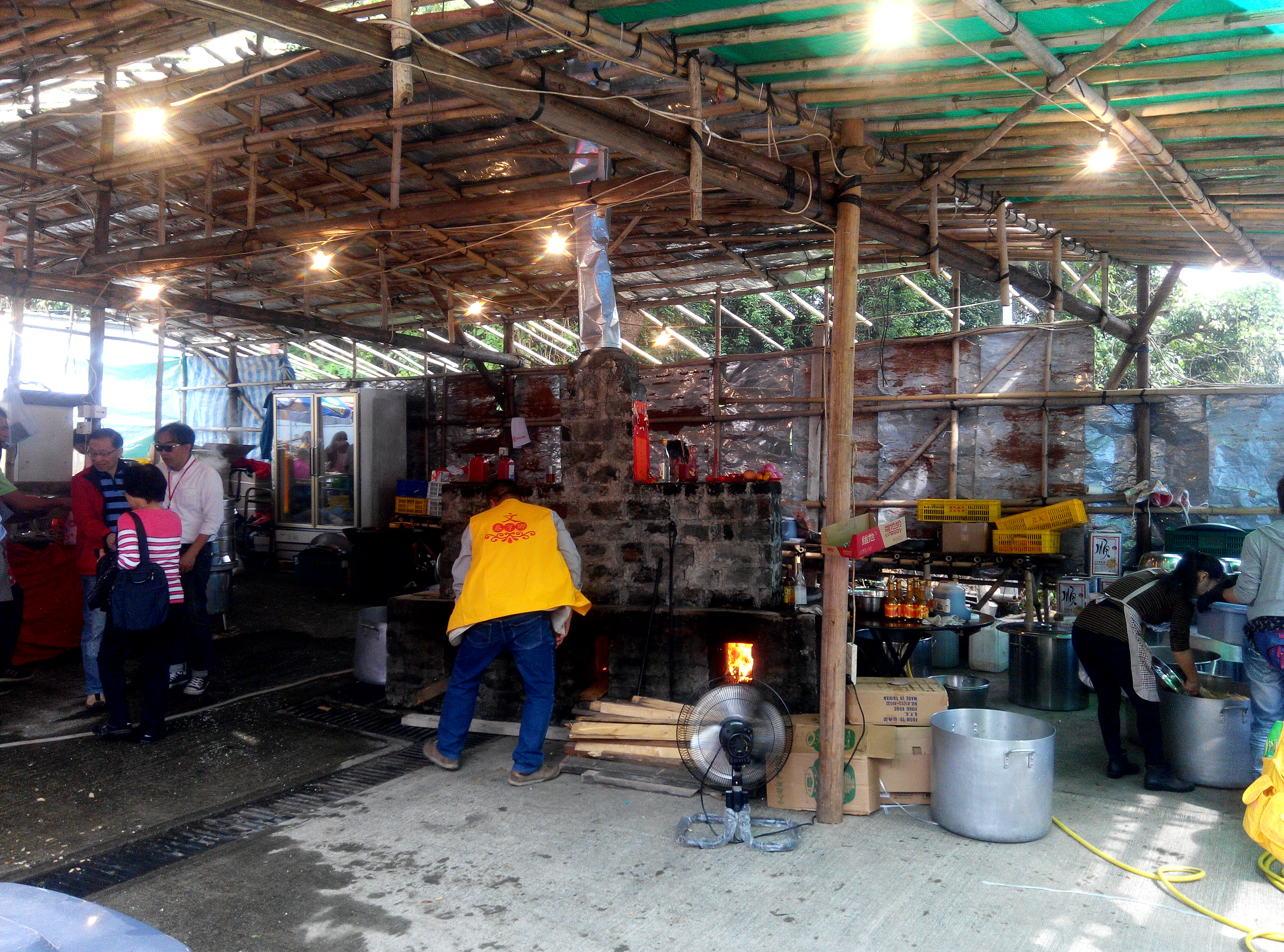
2015 Da Jiu Festival

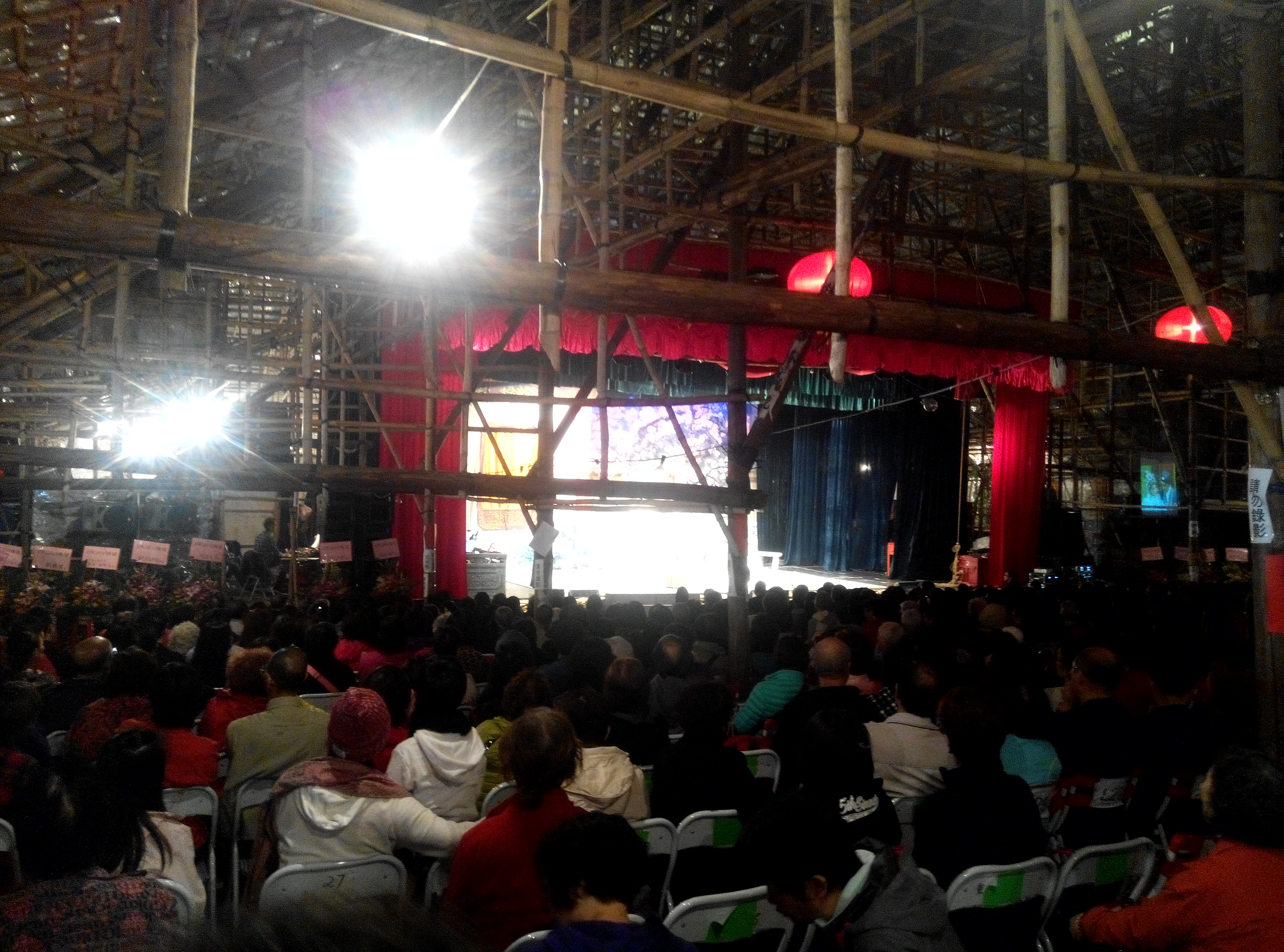
2015 Da Jiu Festival

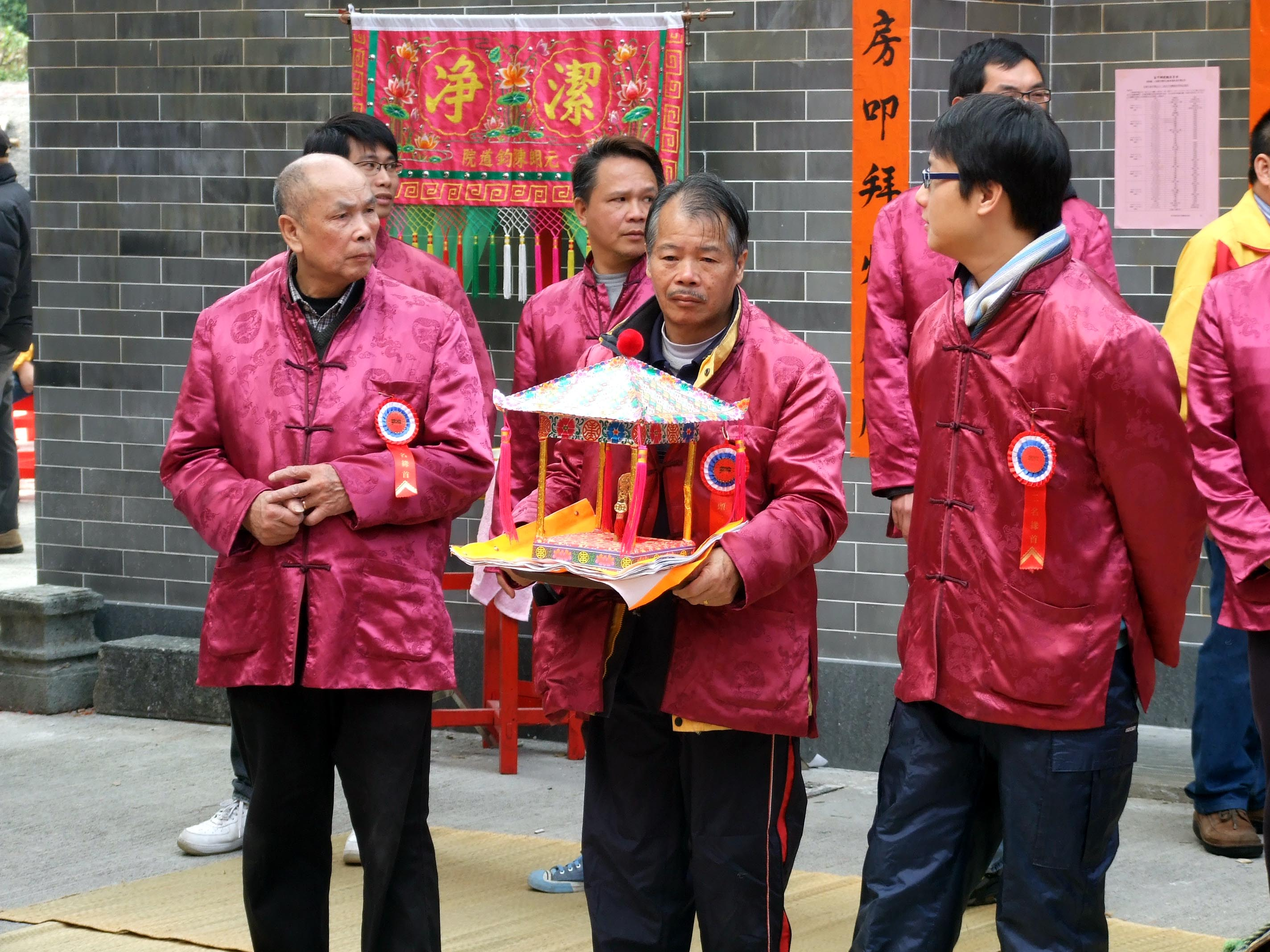
2010 Da Jiu Festival

== See also ==
- San Tin, another area of Hong Kong settled by members of the Man clan
