= San Tin (constituency) =

Hong Kong constituency

- Elected constituency for the Yuen Long District Council
- Boundary of San Tin in Yuen Long District
- District: Yuen Long
- Legislative Council constituency: New Territories North
- Population: 19,617 (2019)
- Electorate: 7,763 (2019)

Current constituency
- Created: 1991
- Number of members: One
- Member: Man Fu-wan (Independent)

San Tin (Chinese: 新田) is one of the 39 constituencies in the Yuen Long District of Hong Kong.

The constituency returns one district councillor to the Yuen Long District Council, with an election every four years. San Tin constituency is loosely based on San Tin, Mai Po, Ngau Tam Mei and Nam Sang Wai with estimated population of 19,617.

== Councillors represented ==
Election	Member	Party
1991	Man Ping-nam	Independent
1999	Man Luk-sing	Independent
2011	Man Kwong-ming	Independent
2019 by-election	Man Ka-koy	Independent
2019	Man Fu-wan	Independent

== Election results ==
=== 2010s ===
Yuen Long District Council Election, 2019: San Tin
Party	Candidate	Votes	%	±%
Nonpartisan	Man Fu-wan	2,257	48.96	
Nonpartisan	Tsui Kai-lung	2,032	44.08	
Nonpartisan	Chau Chun-kun	161	3.49	
Nonpartisan	Man Kwai-ki	160	3.47	
Majority		225	4.88	
Turnout		4,627	59.63	
Nonpartisan gain from Independent		Swing		

San Tin by-election, 2019
Party	Candidate	Votes	%	±%
Independent	Man Ka-koy	1,340	70.34	
Independent	Donald Man Ka-ho	565	29.66	
Majority		775	40.68	
Turnout		1,945	21.12	
Independent gain from Independent		Swing		

Yuen Long District Council Election, 2015: San Tin
Party	Candidate	Votes	%	±%
Independent	Man Kwong-ming	2,286	65.71	−4.91
Independent	Man Kwai-ki	1,193	34.29	
Majority		1,093	31.24	
Turnout		3,479	39.70	
Independent hold		Swing		

Yuen Long District Council Election, 2011: San Tin
Party	Candidate	Votes	%	±%
Independent	Man Kwong-ming	1,865	70.62	
Land Justice League	Chau Chun-kun	776	29.38	
Majority		1,080	41.24	
Turnout		2,641	33.54	
Independent gain from Independent		Swing		

=== 2000s ===
Yuen Long District Council Election, 2007: San Tin
Party	Candidate	Votes	%	±%
Independent	Man Luk-sing	uncontested		
Independent hold		Swing		

Yuen Long District Council Election, 2003: San Tin
Party	Candidate	Votes	%	±%
Independent	Man Luk-sing	1,623	61.27	
Independent	Man Kwok-tong	1,026	38.73	
Majority		595	22.54	
Independent gain from Independent		Swing		

=== 1990s ===
Yuen Long District Council Election, 1999: San Tin
Party	Candidate	Votes	%	±%
Independent	Man Luk-sing	1,422	56.52	
Independent	Man Ping-nam	1,094	43.48	
Majority		328	13.04	
Independent gain from Independent		Swing		

Yuen Long District Council Election, 1994: San Tin
Party	Candidate	Votes	%	±%
Independent	Man Ping-nam	uncontested		
Independent hold		Swing		

Yuen Long District Council Election, 1991: San Tin
Party	Candidate	Votes	%	±%
Independent	Man Ping-nam	uncontested		
Independent win (new seat)				
