= San Tin =

Area in Yuen Long District, Hong Kong

Coordinates: 22.498760°N 114.075950°E

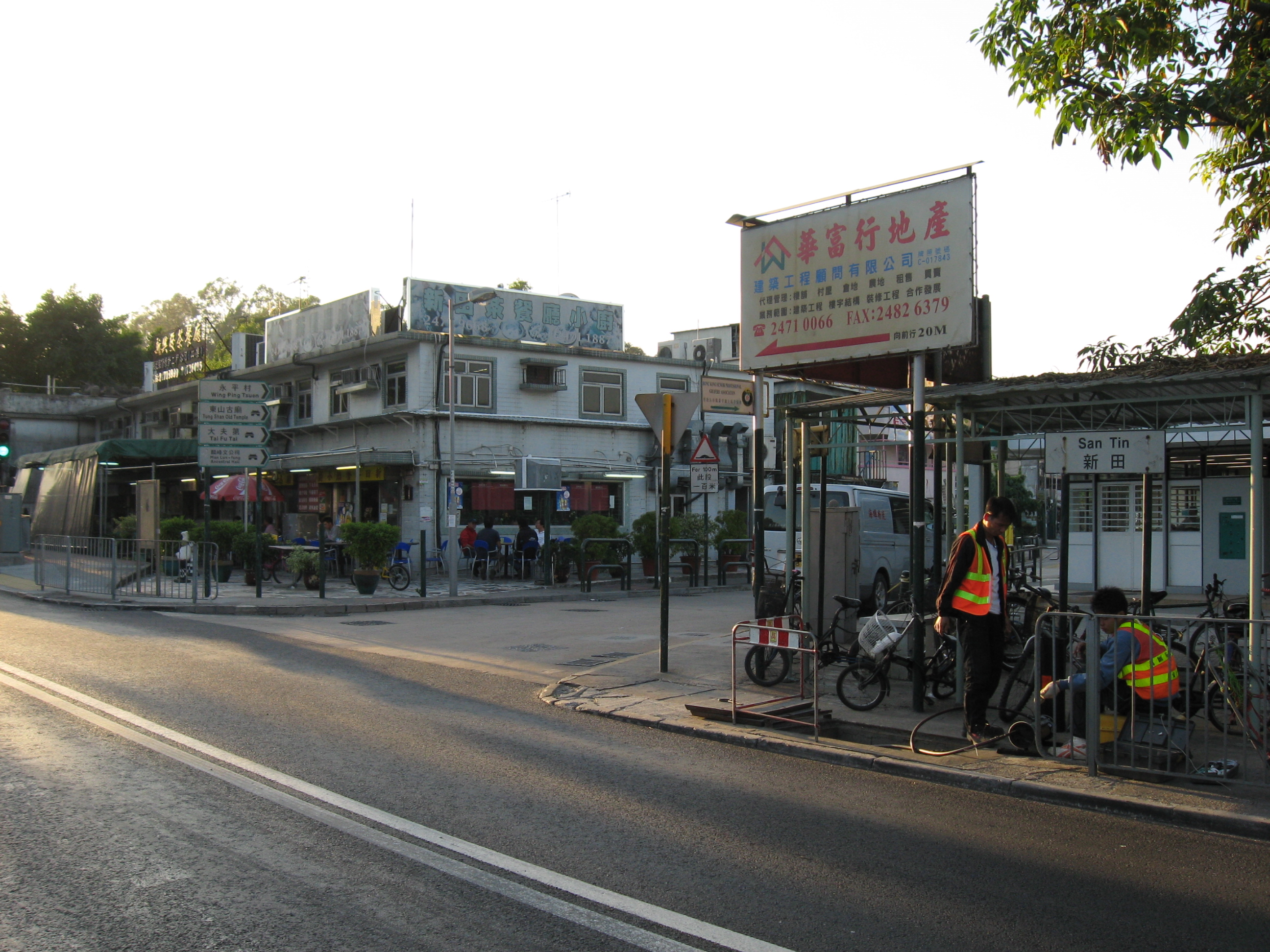
San Tin

San Tin (Chinese: 新田; lit. 'new fields') is a loosely defined area in Yuen Long District in New Territories, Hong Kong that is part of the San Tin constituency. Unlike Hong Kong's highly urbanised areas, San Tin is sparsely populated due to its marshlands.

San Tin is located near Lok Ma Chau. The San Tin Public Transport Interchange services the Lok Ma Chau Control Point–Huanggang Port border crossing, the only 24 hour border crossing between Hong Kong and mainland China.

== History ==
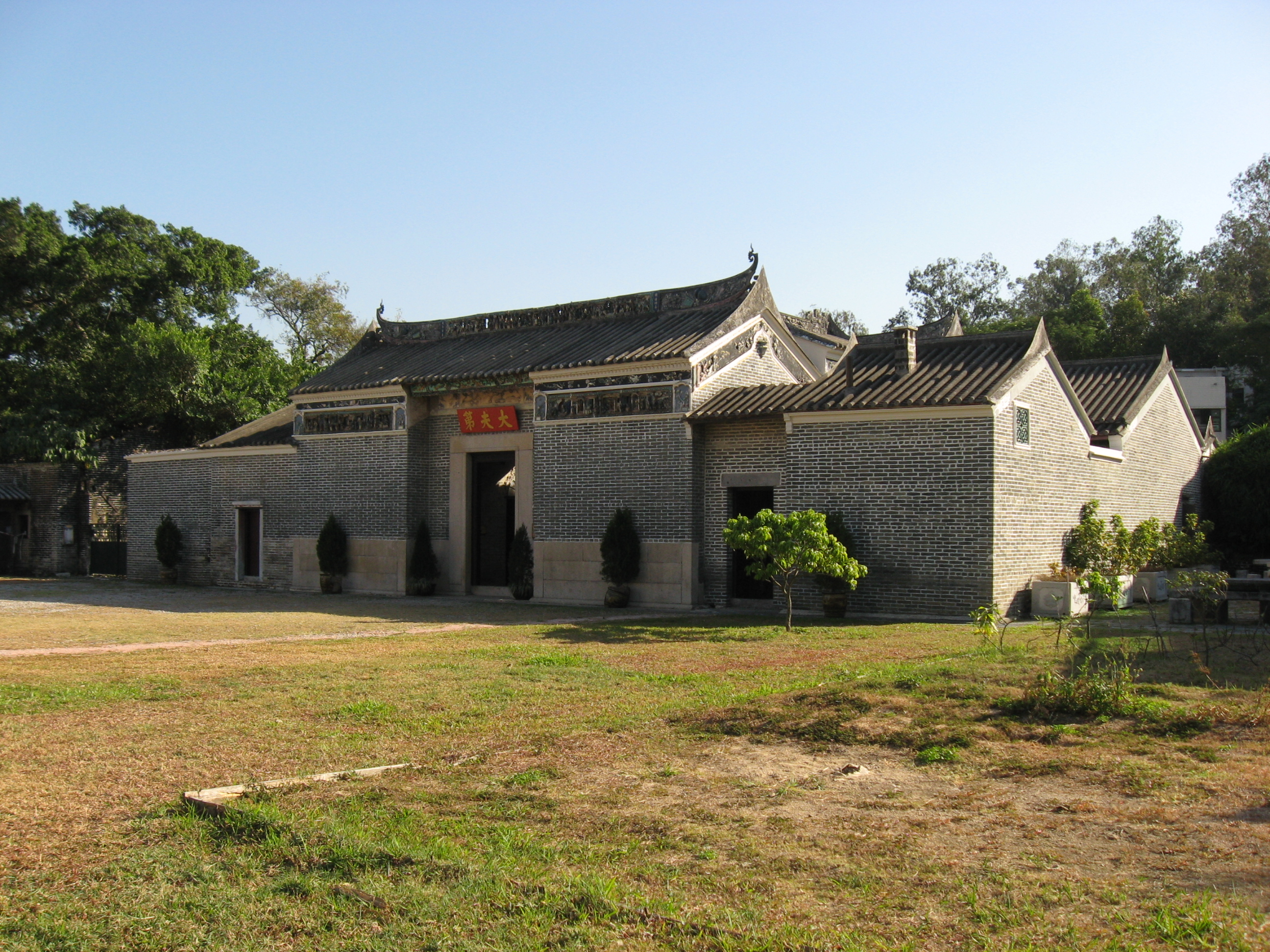
Tai Fu Tai Mansion in San Tin

=== Early history and etymology ===
The area was largely settled and inhabited by a clan with surname Man (文). The clan claims descent from Man Sai-ko (文世歌), who settled near San Tin in the 14th century. For nearly six centuries, the Man clan survived by growing a specialized crop of red rice on brackish-water paddies along the Sham Chun River. The development of the marshy lands into brackish paddies is reflected by the name San Tin which means "new fields".

In the 1860s, the Tai Fu Tai Mansion, considered to be an outstanding example of a 19th-century multi-courtyard residence for scholars, was built in San Tin as a large study hall.

=== 20th and 21st centuries ===
The Man clan became one of the five major surname groups that dominated political life in the Hong Kong New Territories until the 1960s. In the 1960s, the residents of San Tin considered themselves to be part of a regional elite. They adopted local neo-Confucian models of "proper" behavior roughly based on principles given by the 12th century scholar Zhu Xi.

In the early 1950s, the agriculture in San Tin faced a serious crisis because the markets for their specialized rice were located across the river in the newly communist People's Republic of China. Unlike other areas in the New Territories that were based on fresh-water ecosystems, the San Tin farmers could not convert their brackish paddies to white rice paddies or vegetable farms. Before the First Commonwealth Immigrants Act went into effect on July 1, 1962, 85–90 percent of the able-bodied males in San Tin left for the United Kingdom between 1955 and 1962 to work in British factories, foundries, railways, buses, hotels, and restaurants. By the 1970s, large-scale emigration to the urban areas of Hong Kong and overseas countries left many old villages abandoned.

In 2004, it was estimated that four thousand people from over 20 countries in the San Tin diaspora claimed descent from Man Sai-go.

== Geography ==
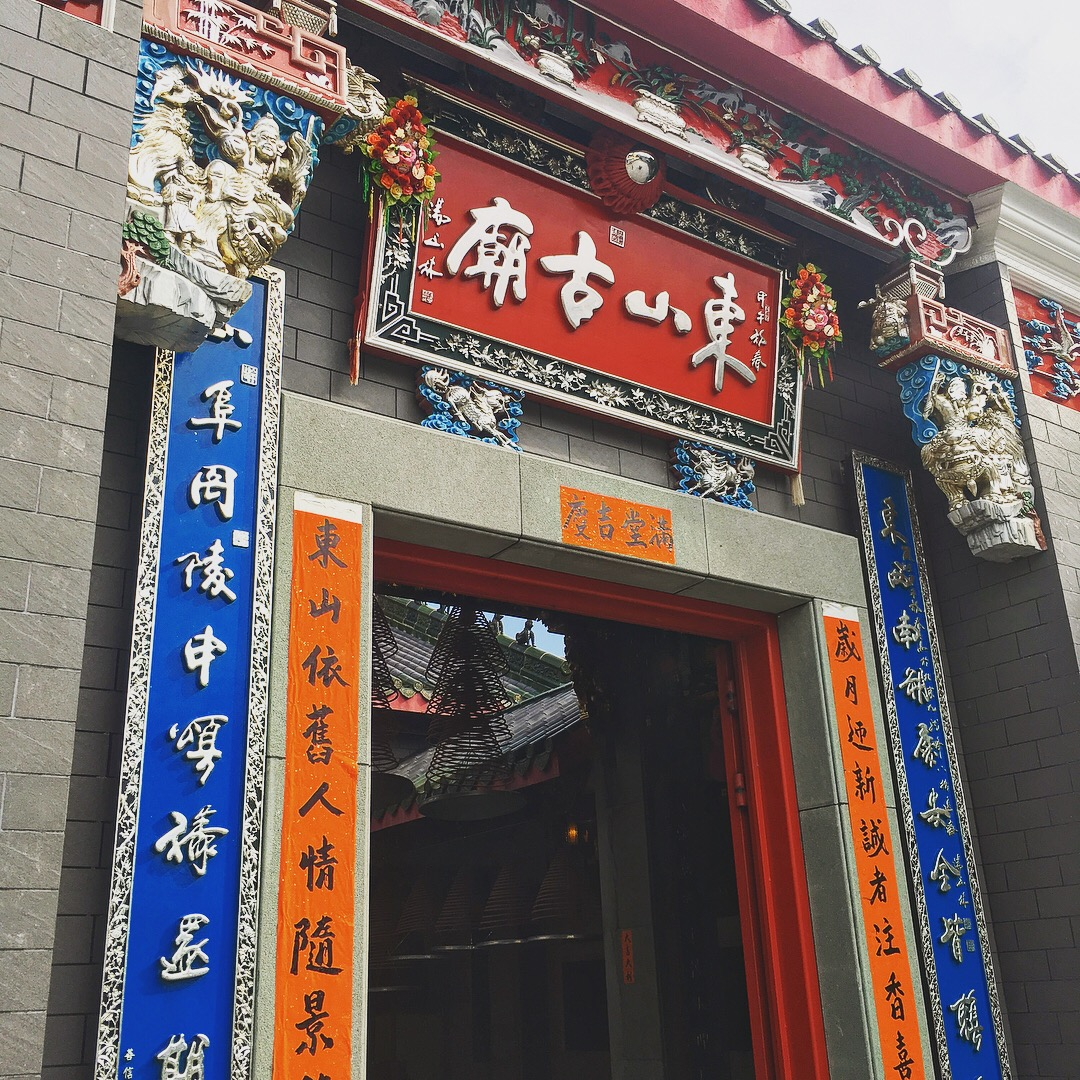
Tung Shan Temple, in Wing Ping Tsuen, San Tin.

San Tin is located in the far north of the Kowloon Peninsula, just south of the Sham Chun River (Shenzhen River) that separates Hong Kong from mainland China. San Tin is situated on expansive shallow wetlands that were partially developed into brackish rice paddy fields after the arrival of the Man clan in the 14th century.

The Mai Po Marshes are located in the northwest of the constituency and the Nam Sang Wai wetland area is in the southwest of the constituency. The suburb Ngau Tam Mei is also contained in the San Tin constituency.

There are numerous historic village temples scattered around the area, as well as a park dedicated to Man Tin Cheung.

== Administration ==
=== Subdivisions ===
San Tin has eight hamlet-like settlements each consisting of one or two lanes of compact brick houses. The settlement Wing Ping Tsuen (永平村) contains the Tai Fu Tai Mansion. Other settlements include: Chau Tau, Fan Tin Tsuen, Pok Wai, San Wai, Shek Wu Wai and Tung Chan Wai.

=== Governance ===
San Tin is one of the 31 constituencies in the Yuen Long District of Hong Kong. San Tin had estimated population of 20,990 in 2015.

The constituency appoints one district councillor to the Yuen Long District Council, with an election every four years.

=== Councillors elected ===
Election	Member	Party
1991	Man Ping-nam	Independent
1999	Man Luk-sing	Independent
2011	Man Kwong-ming	Independent
2019 by-election	Man Ka-koy	Independent

== Education ==
San Tin is in Primary One Admission (POA) School Net 74. Within the school net are multiple aided schools (operated independently but funded with government money) and one government school: Yuen Long Government Primary School (元朗官立小學).

== Military ==
San Tin Barracks forms part of the People's Liberation Army Hong Kong Garrison. Prior to the 1997 handover of Hong Kong to the People's Republic of China, San Tin Barracks was known as Cassino Lines. Nepalese Ghurka troops were among those stationed there pre the handover.

== Transport ==
=== San Tin Highway ===
San Tin Highway (Chinese: 新田公路; pinyin: Xīntián Gōnglù; Cantonese Yale: san1 tin4 gung1 lou6) is a northeast–southwest expressway in north-western New Territories of Hong Kong. San Tin Highway connects Fanling Highway at its northeastern end at San Tin Interchange to a fork at the Tsing Long Highway and Yuen Long Highway at Kam Tin River east of Yuen Long at the southwestern end of the San Tin Highway. Slip roads from San Tin Interchange on to San Sham Road lead to Lok Ma Chau Control Point 2 km to the north.

San Tin Highway is also part of Route 9. The road was completed between 1991 and 1993.

=== San Tin Public Transport Interchange ===
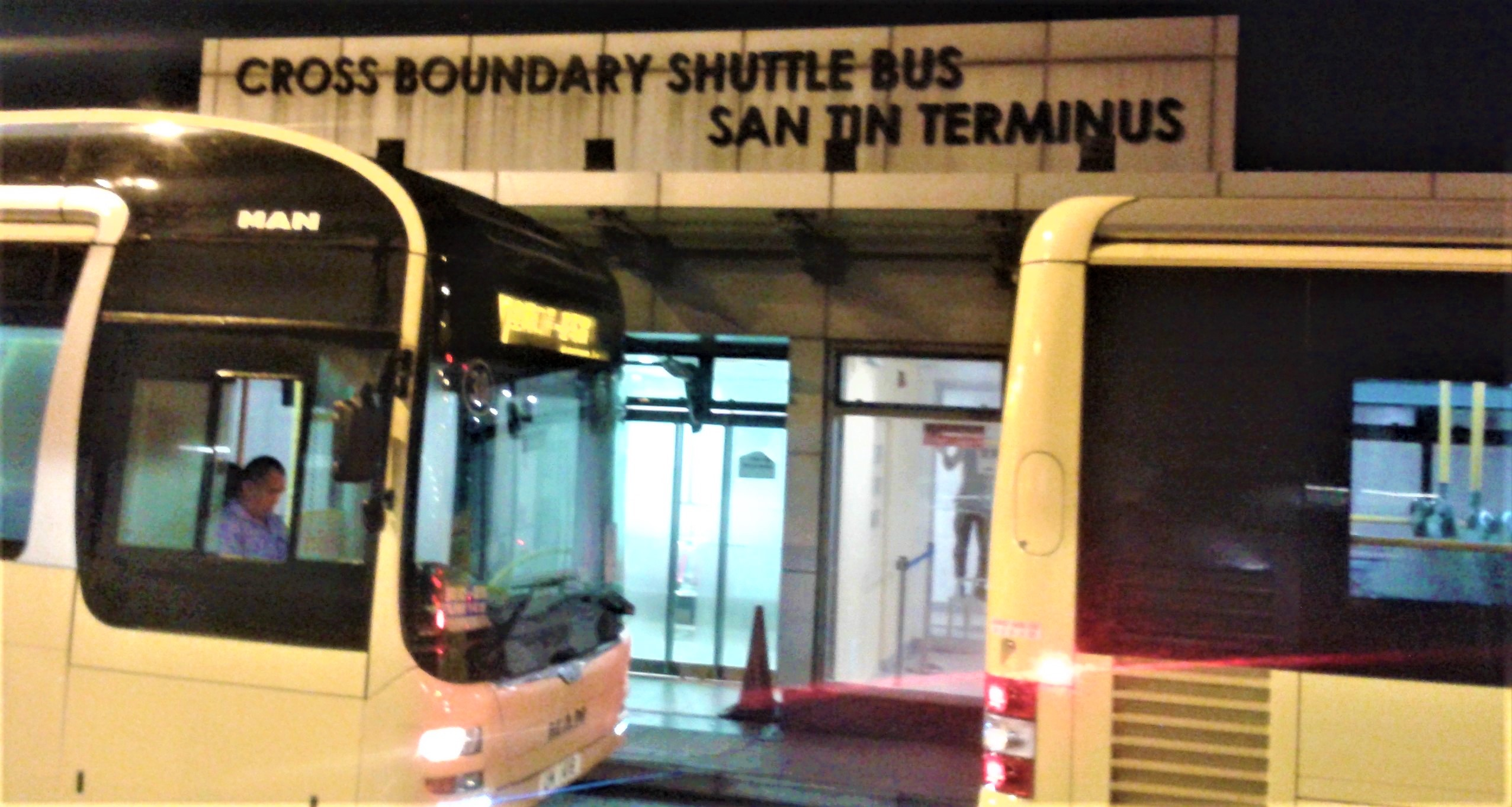
San Tin Cross Boundary Shuttle Bus Terminus at San Tin PTI

The San Tin Public Transport Interchange (San Tin PTI) is a bus, minibus, and taxi interchange adjacent to the San Tin Interchange. At the centre of the San Tin PTI is the Cross Boundary Shuttle Bus Terminus, which serves the Hong Kong border Lok Ma Chau Control Point and its counterpart Huanggang Port in Shenzhen. In correspondence with the Lok Ma Chau–Huanggang border crossing being the only 24-hour border crossing between Hong Kong and mainland China, the San Tin PTI operates 24 hours per day and 365 days per year.

The San Tin PTI also offers bus connections serving Lok Ma Chau Spur Line Control Point in Hong Kong which corresponds to Futian Checkpoint in Shenzhen.

Hong Kong destinations serviced from San Tin PTI are Tai Lam Tunnel Toll Plaza, Hong Kong International Airport and locations at and near 4 major settlements in New Territories (Fanling, Sheung Shui, Yuen Long and Tuen Mun). There is a highly infrequent unnumbered service to destinations en route to and from Kwun Tong that run almost exclusively as a night service. 616S is a night service between Mong Kok and Lok Ma Chau Control Point.

=== San Tin Rail Station ===
San Tin station (Chinese: 新田) is a proposed station on the Northern Link of the MTR in Hong Kong. As of 2012, there are still no construction plans for the station, although the Yuen Long District Council has pressed the government to construct the station "as soon as possible".

== See also ==
- Tai Hang, in Tai Po District. Another area of Hong Kong settled by members of the Man clan
