= Fui Sha Wai (Tai Po District) =

Walled village in Hong Kong

Fui Sha Wai Chinese: 灰沙圍
- Village
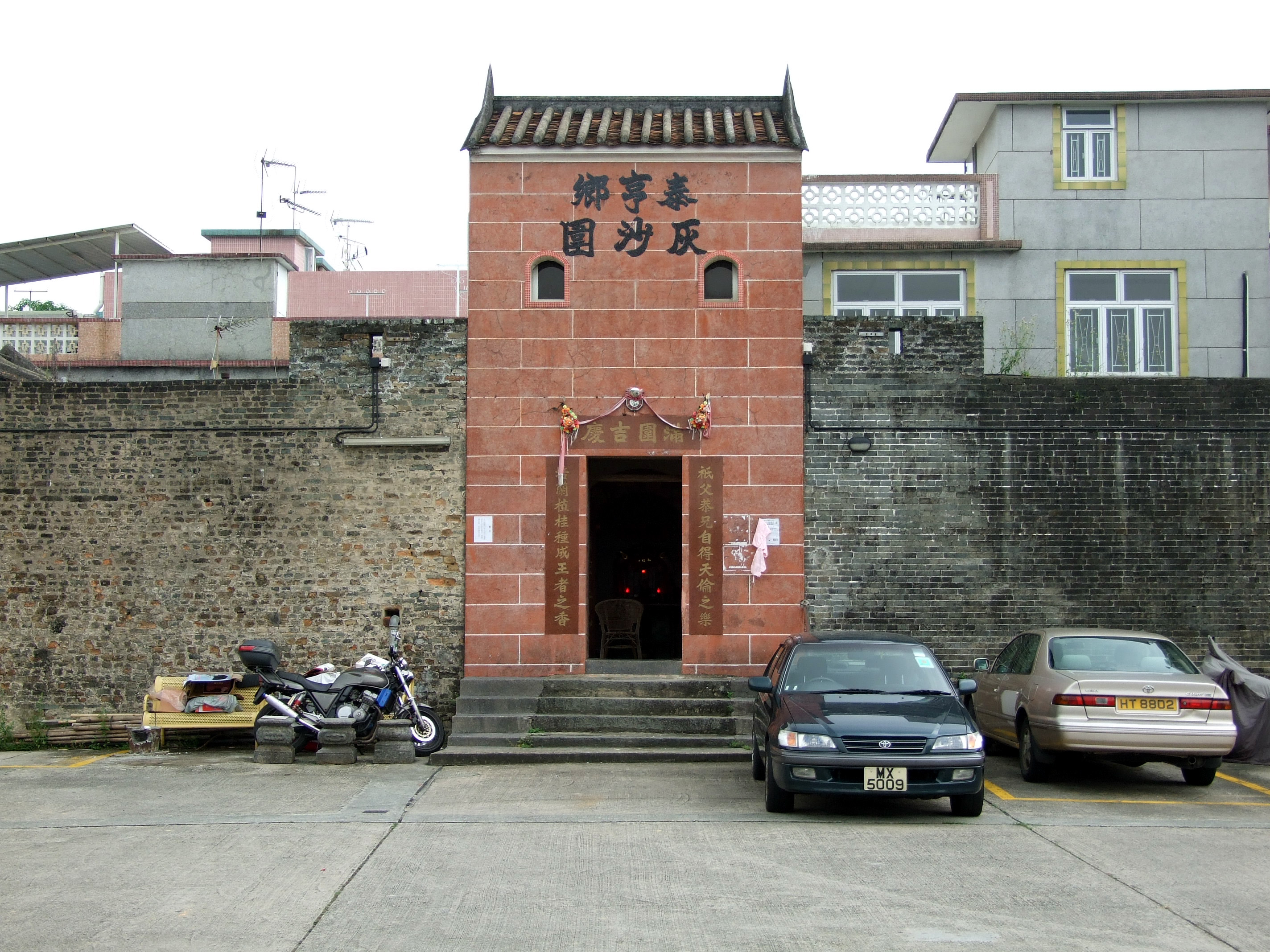
- Entrance gate of Fui Sha Wai

- Location within Hong Kong
- Coordinates: 22.469915°N 114.151535°E
- Country: People's Republic of China
- Special administrative region: Hong Kong
- District: Tai Po District
- Area: Tai Hang
- Time zone: UTC+8:00 (HKT)

Fui Sha Wai (Chinese: 灰沙圍) is a walled village in Tai Hang, Tai Po District, Hong Kong.

== Administration ==
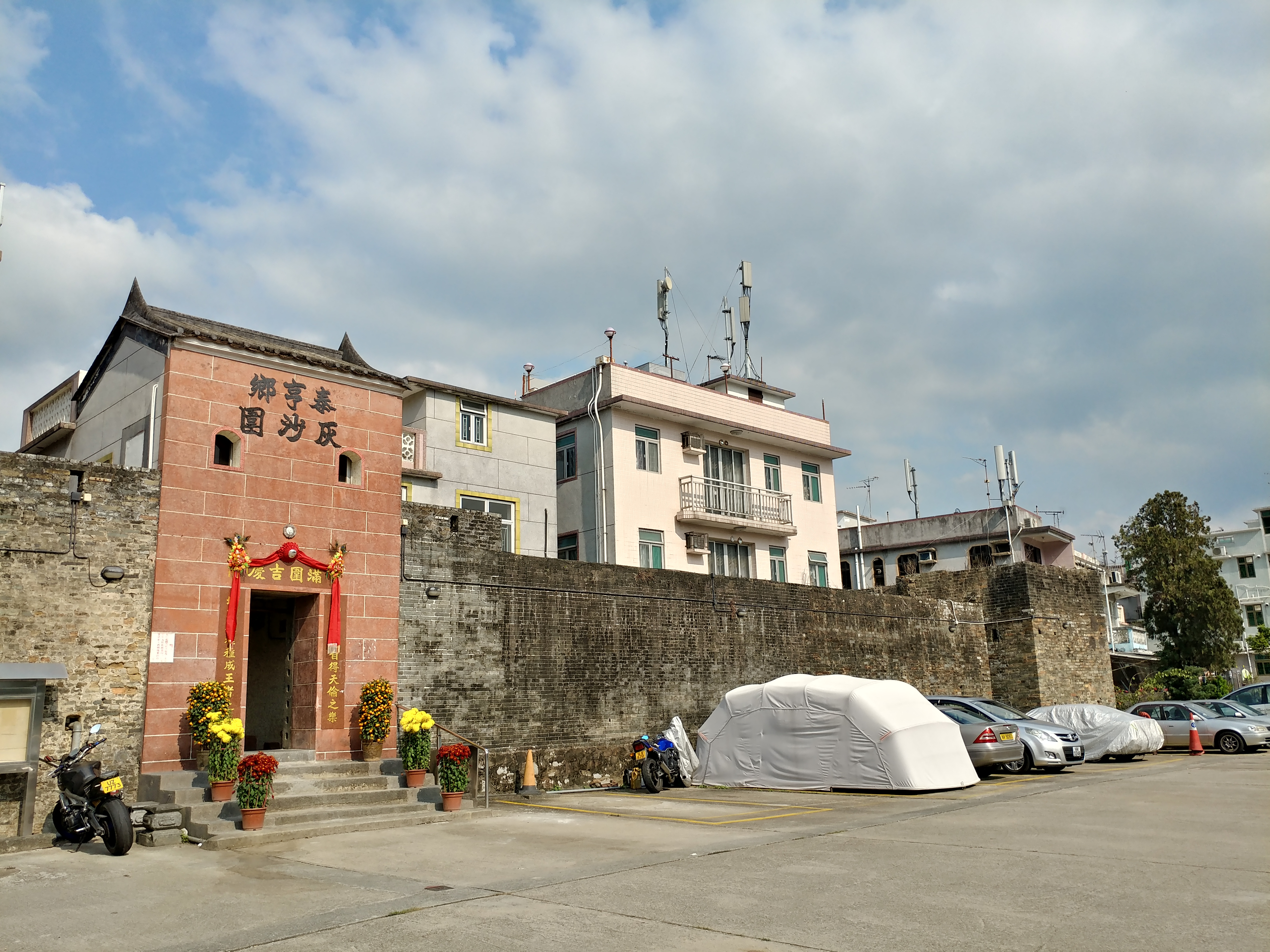
Entrance gate and walls of Fui Sha Wai.

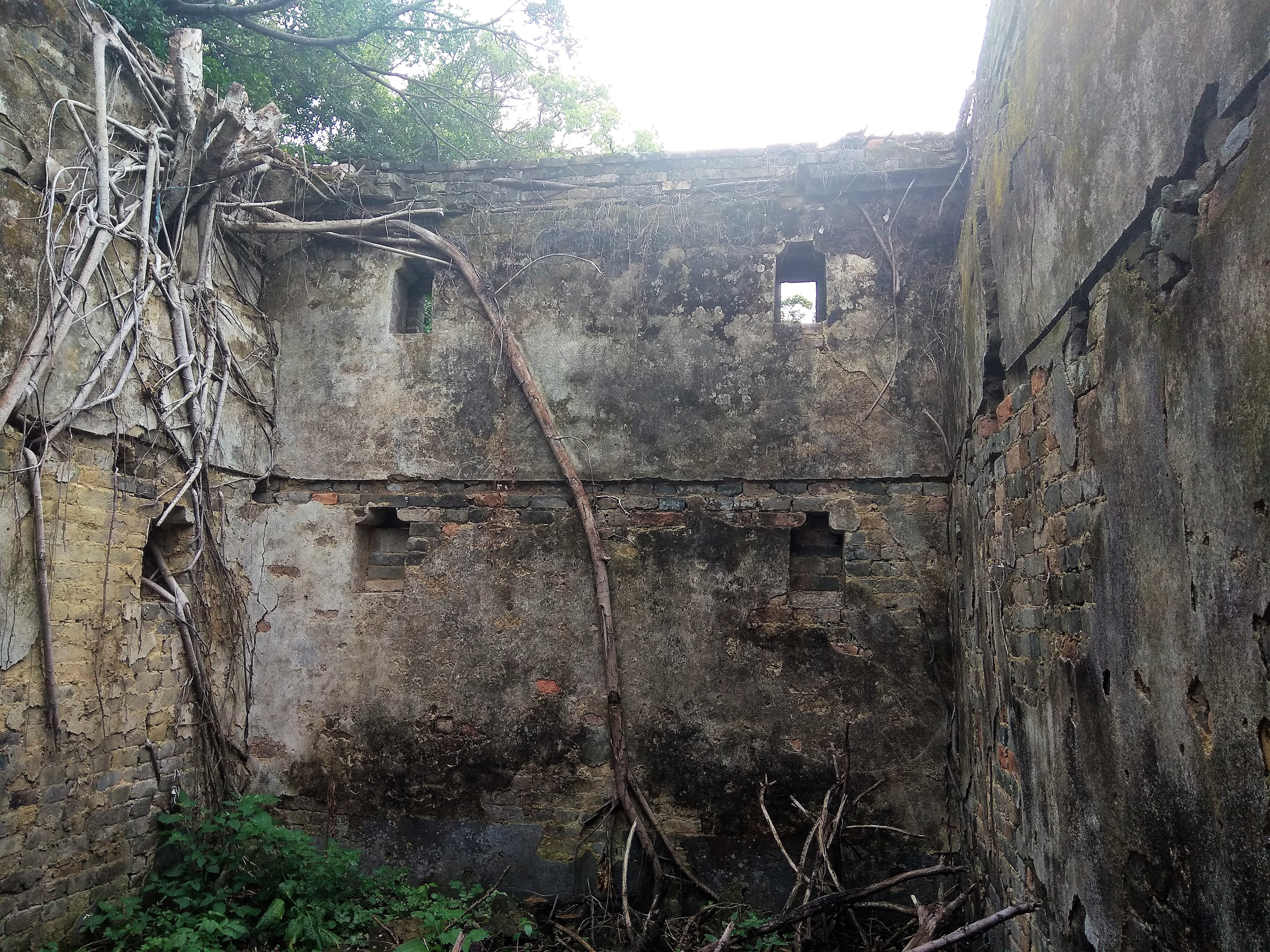
Interior of the remains of the eastern wachtower of Fui Sha Wai.

Fui Sha Wai is one of the villages represented within the Tai Po Rural Committee. For electoral purposes, Fui Sha Wai is part of the Lam Tsuen Valley constituency, which was formerly represented by Richard Chan Chun-chit until October 2021.

== History ==
At the time of the 1911 census, the population of Tai Hang Fui Sha Wai was 117. The number of males was 47.

== Conservation ==
The enclosing walls of Fui Sha Wai have been listed as Grade III historic buildings.

== See also ==
- Walled villages of Hong Kong
- Chung Sum Wai (Tai Hang), a nearby walled village in Tai Hang
