= Hong Kong Polytechnic University =

Public university in Kowloon, Hong Kong

- 香港理工大學
- Motto: 開物成務 勵學利民
- Motto in English: To learn and to apply, for the benefit of mankind
- Type: Public
- Established: 1937; 89 years ago, as Government Trade School; 1947; 79 years ago, as Hong Kong Technical College; 24 March 1972; 54 years ago, as Hong Kong Polytechnic; 25 November 1994; 31 years ago, granted university status
- Academic affiliations: BHUA; GHMUA; JHMUA; SHUA; UASR; ASRTU; ANSO; CPEC Consortium of Universities; UCMSR; ACNET-EngTech; BRAIA; ISTA; USRN; IAF
- Chairman: Lam Tai-fai
- President: Teng Jin-guang
- Vice-president: DP: Wing-tak Wong; SVP (RI): Christopher Chao; VP (EDU): Cao Jiannong; VP (SGA): Ben Young; VP (KT): Zijian ZHENG; VP (AD): CHEUNG Leong; Interim VP (CF): Ben LAU
- Academic staff: 1,569
- Students: 33,900
- Location: 11 Yuk Choi Road, Hung Hom, Kowloon, Hong Kong; 22°18′18″N 114°10′48″E
- Campus: 9.46 hectares (0.0946 km^{2}); Urban
- Colours: Red and grey
- Website: polyu.edu.hk

Chinese name
- Traditional Chinese: 香港理工大學
- Simplified Chinese: 香港理工大学
- Cantonese Yale: Hēunggóng Léihgūng Daaihhohk
Transcriptions
Standard Mandarin
- Hanyu Pinyin: Xiānggǎng Lǐgōng Dàxué
Yue: Cantonese
- Yale Romanization: Hēunggóng Léihgūng Daaihhohk
- Jyutping: Hoeng1gong2 lei5gung1 daai6hok6

The Hong Kong Polytechnic University (PolyU or HKPU) (Note: The university's communications guidelines recommend using "PolyU" as the abbreviation for institutional branding purposes. The Hong Kong government, on the other hand, uses "HKPU" and "PolyU" interchangeably as abbreviations in legal and official documents.) is a public university in Hung Hom, Kowloon, Hong Kong. The university is one of the eight government-funded degree-granting tertiary institutions in Hong Kong. Founded in 1937 as the first Government Trade School, it is the first institution to provide technical education in Hong Kong. In 1994, the Legislative Council of Hong Kong passed a bill which granted the former Hong Kong Polytechnic official university status.

PolyU consists of 7 Faculties, 4 Schools and 1 College, offering programmes covering business, computer and mathematical sciences, construction and environment, engineering, health and social science, humanities, design, fashion and textiles, hotel and tourism management.

== History ==
=== Government Trade School (1937–1947) ===
In 1937, the Government Trade School was founded at Wood Road, Wan Chai. The school was the first publicly funded, post-secondary technical institution in Hong Kong. Under George White, the then principal, it ran classes in marine wireless operating, mechanical engineering and building construction. The campus was a three-storey high Victorian architecture, and commonly referred to the "Red Brick House" by the locals.

=== Hong Kong Technical College (1947–1972) ===
After World War II, the Government Trade School became the Hong Kong Technical College in 1947, offering both full-time and part-time courses. In 1957, the college's new campus in Hung Hom was constructed. It was opened by Alexander Grantham, the then Governor of Hong Kong.

=== Hong Kong Polytechnic (1972–1994) ===
In 1965, Sir Sze-yuen Chung (S.Y. Chung) suggested establishing a polytechnic in Hong Kong to provide post-secondary technical education. Tang Ping-yuen was appointed by the government as the chair of the Polytechnic Planning Committee in May 1969. On 24 March 1972, the Legislative Council passed the Hong Kong Polytechnic Ordinance and the institute was established. Sir Chung assumed the first chair of the Polytechnic Board of Directors (later renamed Polytechnic Council in 1978). The Polytechnic's mandate was to provide professional-oriented education to meet the need for qualified workers. The institution launched its first five degree programmes in 1983, and introduced its first MPhil and PhD programmes in 1986 and 1989 respectively.

=== Hong Kong Polytechnic University (1994–present) ===
In 1994, the university gained approval from the University and Polytechnic Grants Committee (UPGC; now UGC) for self-accreditation of degree programmes, without the restrictions from the Post Secondary Colleges Ordinance. With that, the Institution assumed full university status on 25 November 1994, changing its name to "The Hong Kong Polytechnic University".

== Campuses ==
=== Main campus ===
PolyU's main campus, in Hung Hom, Kowloon, was designed by a team led by James Kinoshita from P&T Group in 1972. It has over 20 buildings with red-brick walls, many of which are inter-connected and raised one floor above the podium, creating sheltered open-air spaces for multi-purposes such as logistics and parking. Apart from buildings named after donors, the rotundas which connects the buildings are identified in English letters (from cores and blocks A to Z, without K, O and I). It is one of the largest and densest educational campus in the world.

Block Z is the eighth phase of the campus expansion project. It is situated across the northwestern side of the main campus, separated by Chatham Road. It can be accessed through a pedestrian tunnel or an 80-meter-long footbridge, which was proposed in 2016 and built in 2019.

In addition to classrooms, laboratories and other academic facilities, the university provides a multi-purpose auditorium, recreational and catering facilities, medical facilities, as well as a bookstore and banks. The Jockey Club Auditorium began operation in 2000, its balcony and main floor seating accommodate up to 1,084 persons. It is specially designed as a multi-purpose venue for the hosting of conferences, seminars, ceremonies, corporate meetings, as well as the increasing number of cultural activities and performances, operas, chamber music, dramas, dances, film shows, variety shows, mini concerts etc.

There are multiple sports facilities, including two swimming pools (Block X and Michael Clinton Swimming Pool), 2 indoor sports grounds (Shaw Sports Complex and Kwong On Jubilee Sports Centre), an outdoor sports ground (Keith Legg Sports Field) with basketball and soccer fields and jogging track, 2 outdoor tennis courts, and a joint-sports centre.

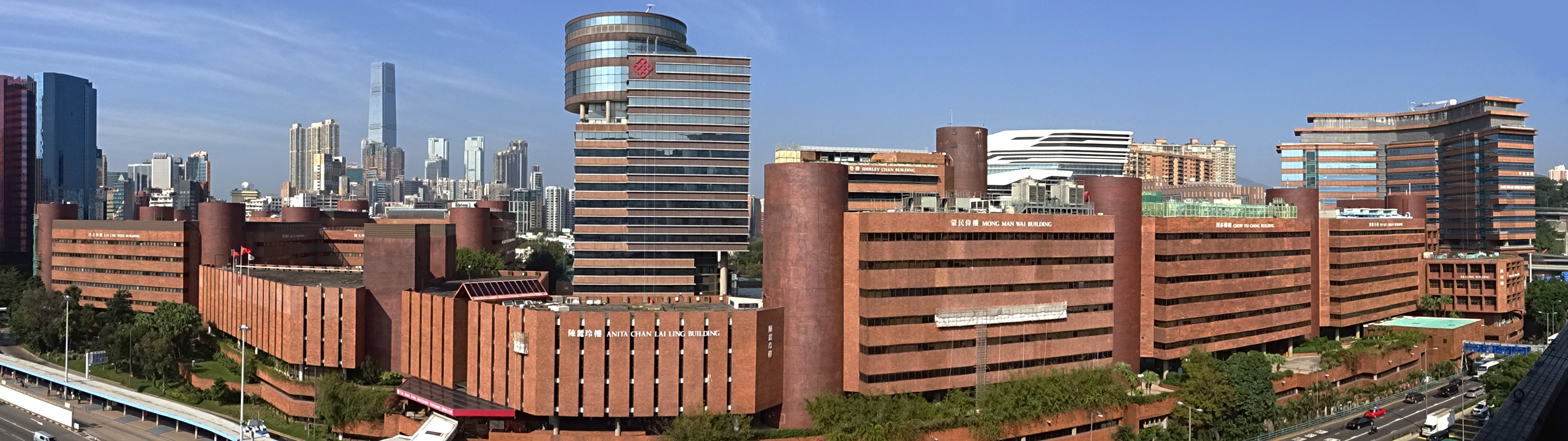
Landscape of the main campus in Hung Hom in January 2016
Main Campus, PolyU

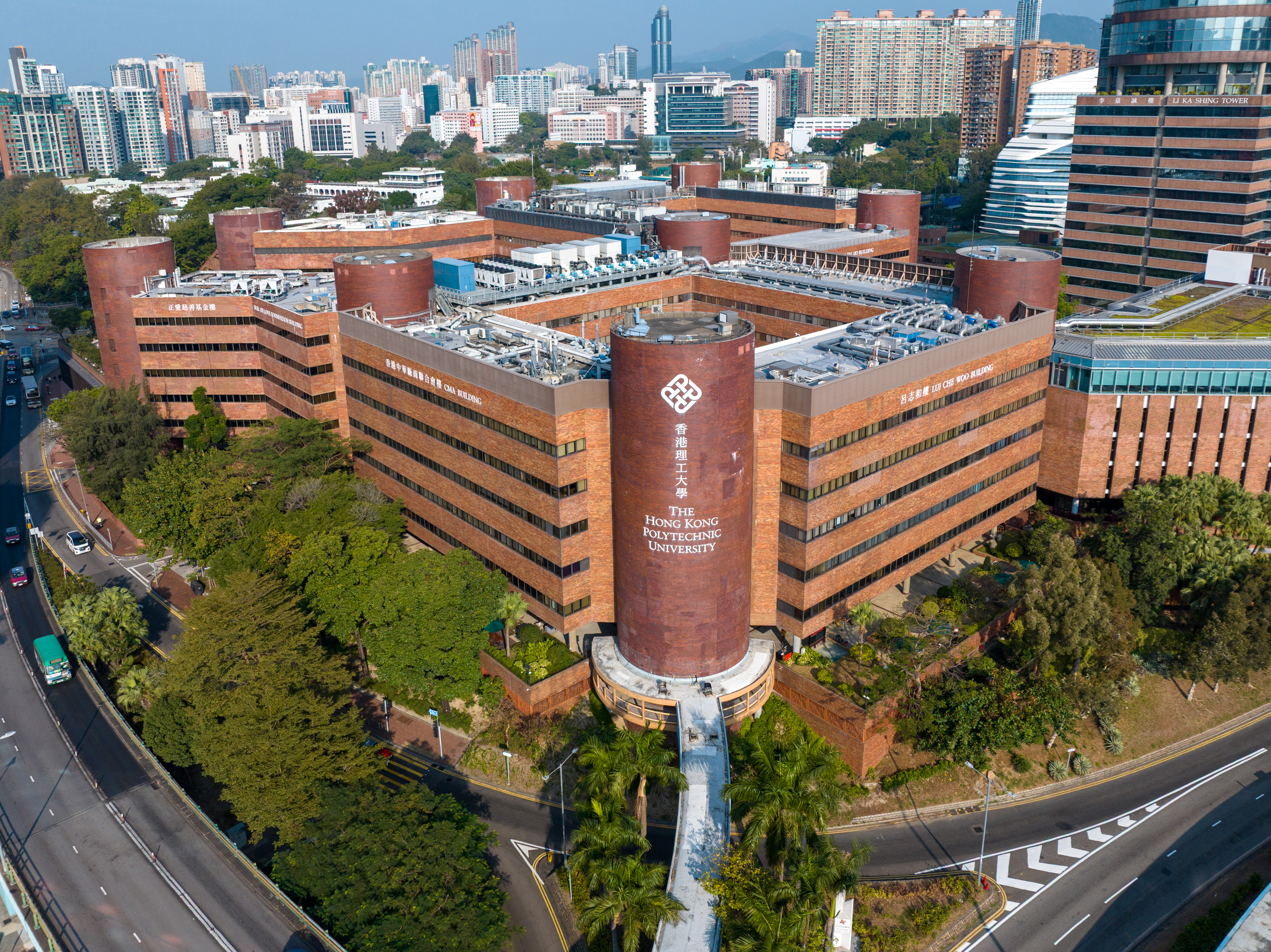
PolyU Main Campus aerial view, 2024

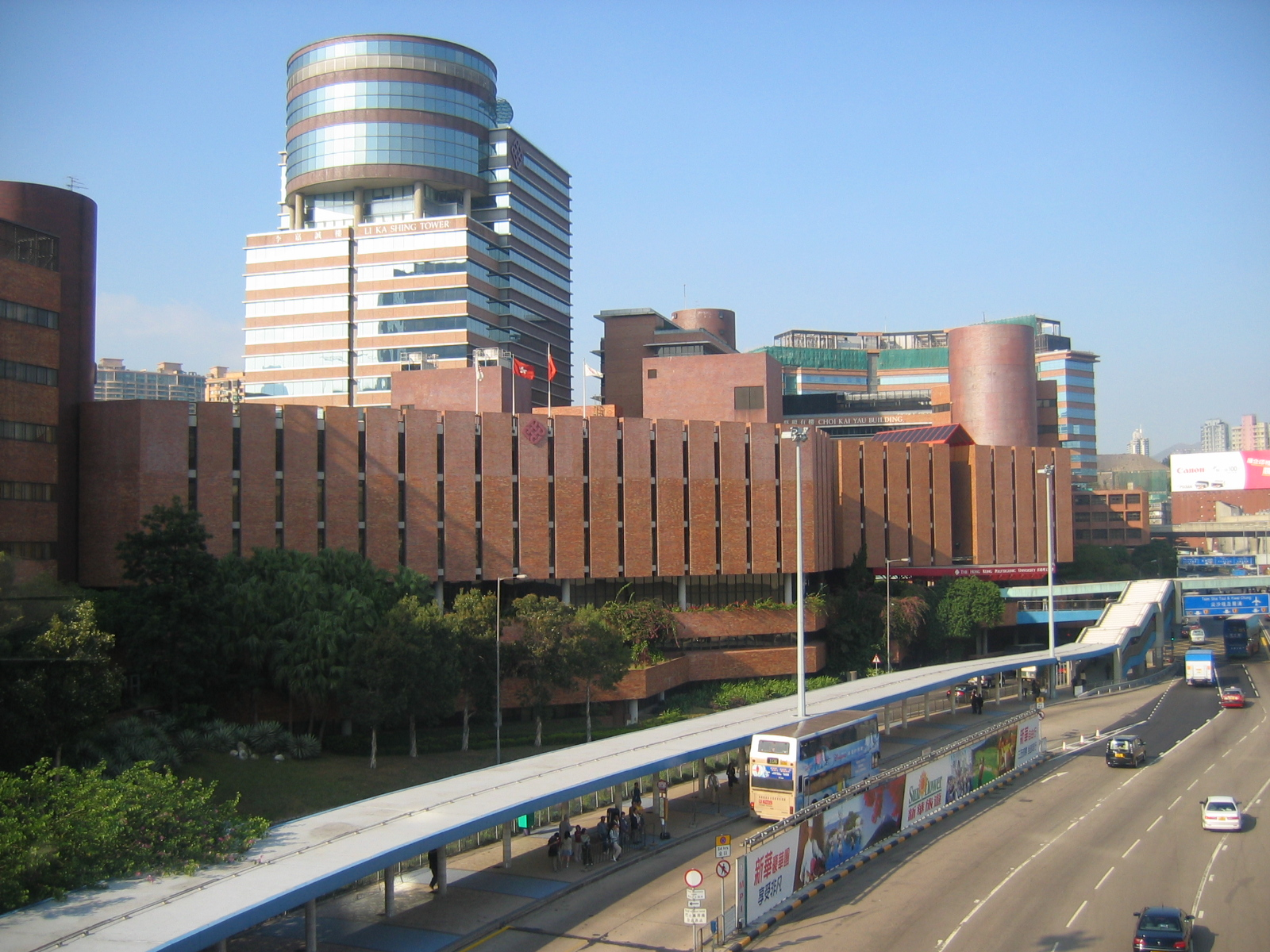
PolyU

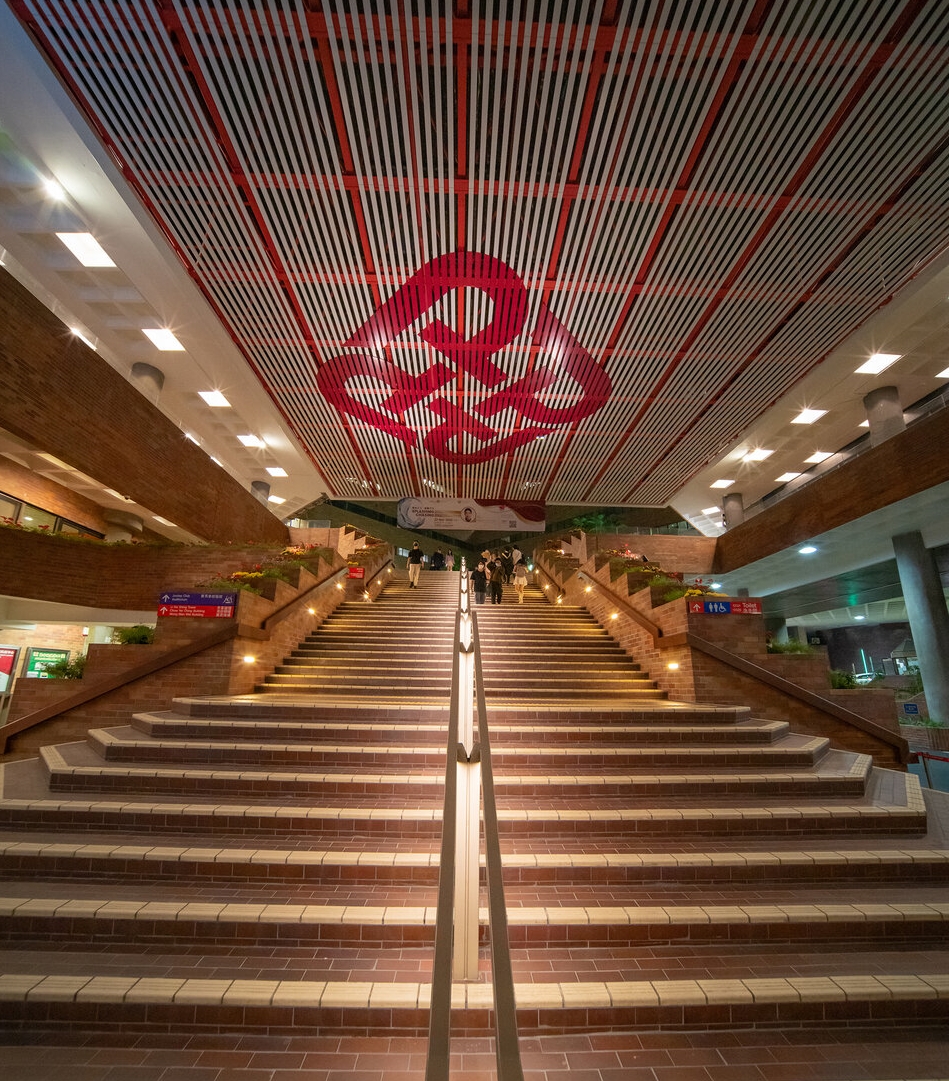
Main Entrance at Core A, 2022

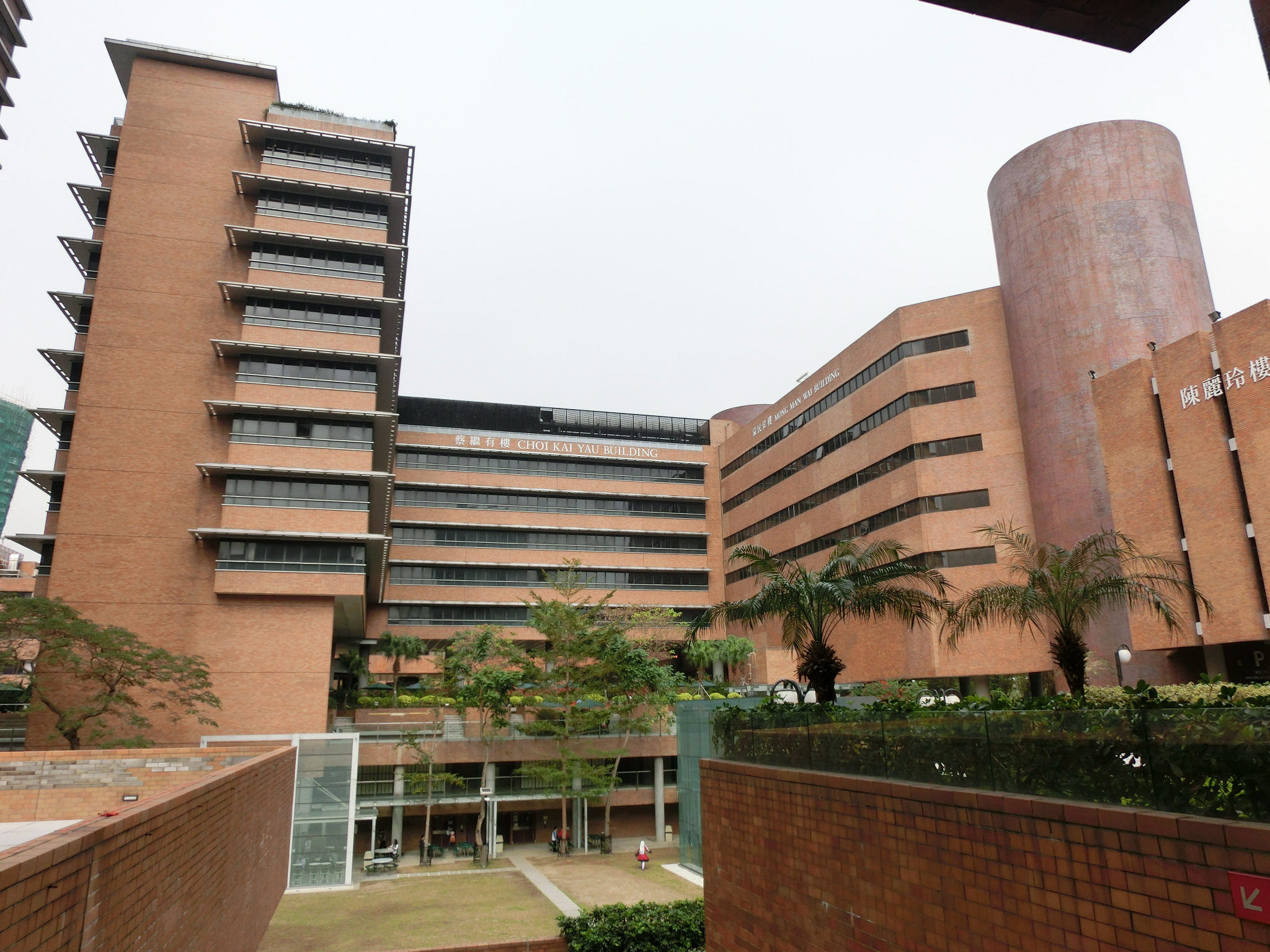
Choi Kai Yau Building, 2013
Li Ka Shing Tower, Main Campus, PolyU

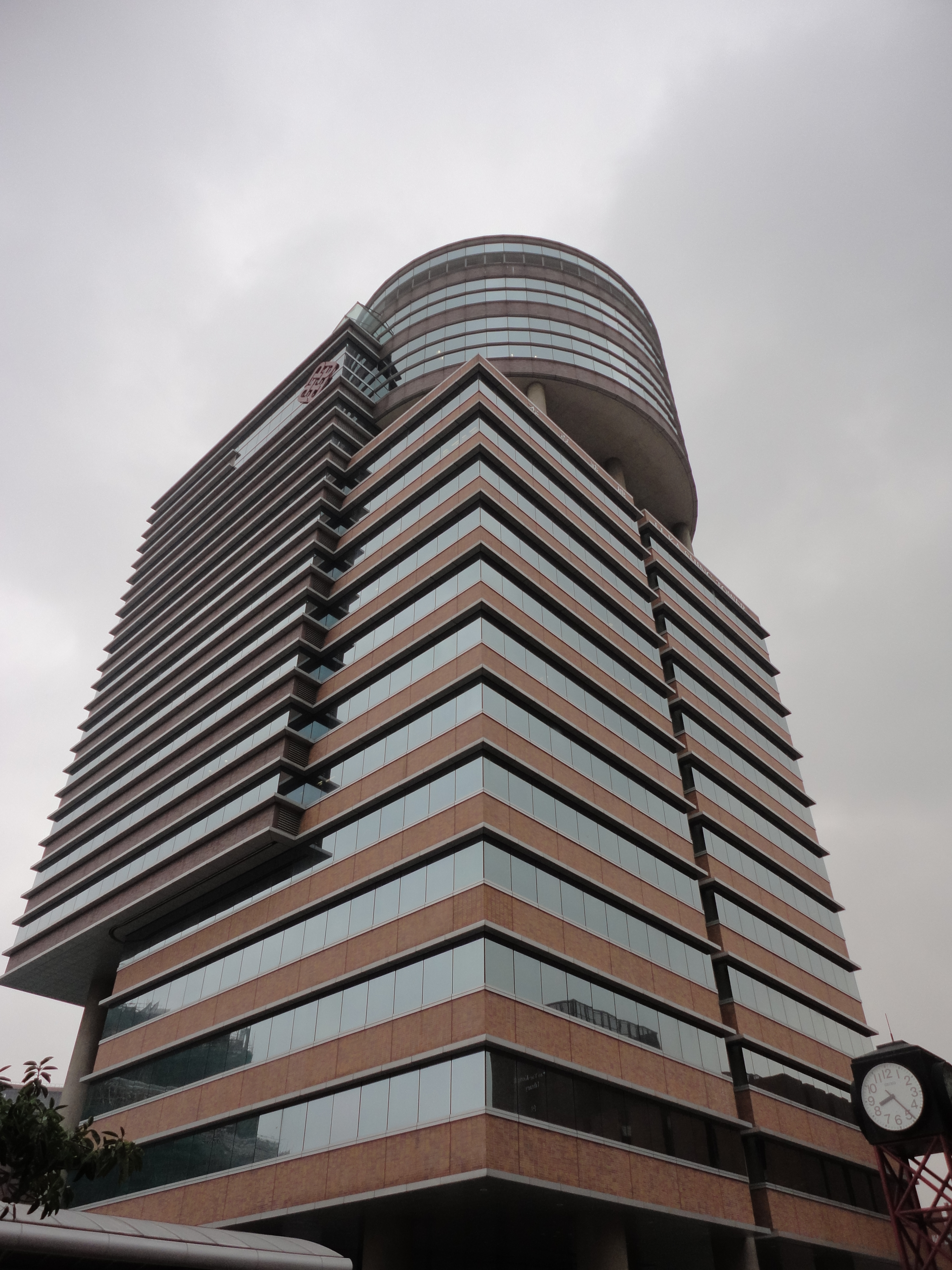
LKS Tower, 2013

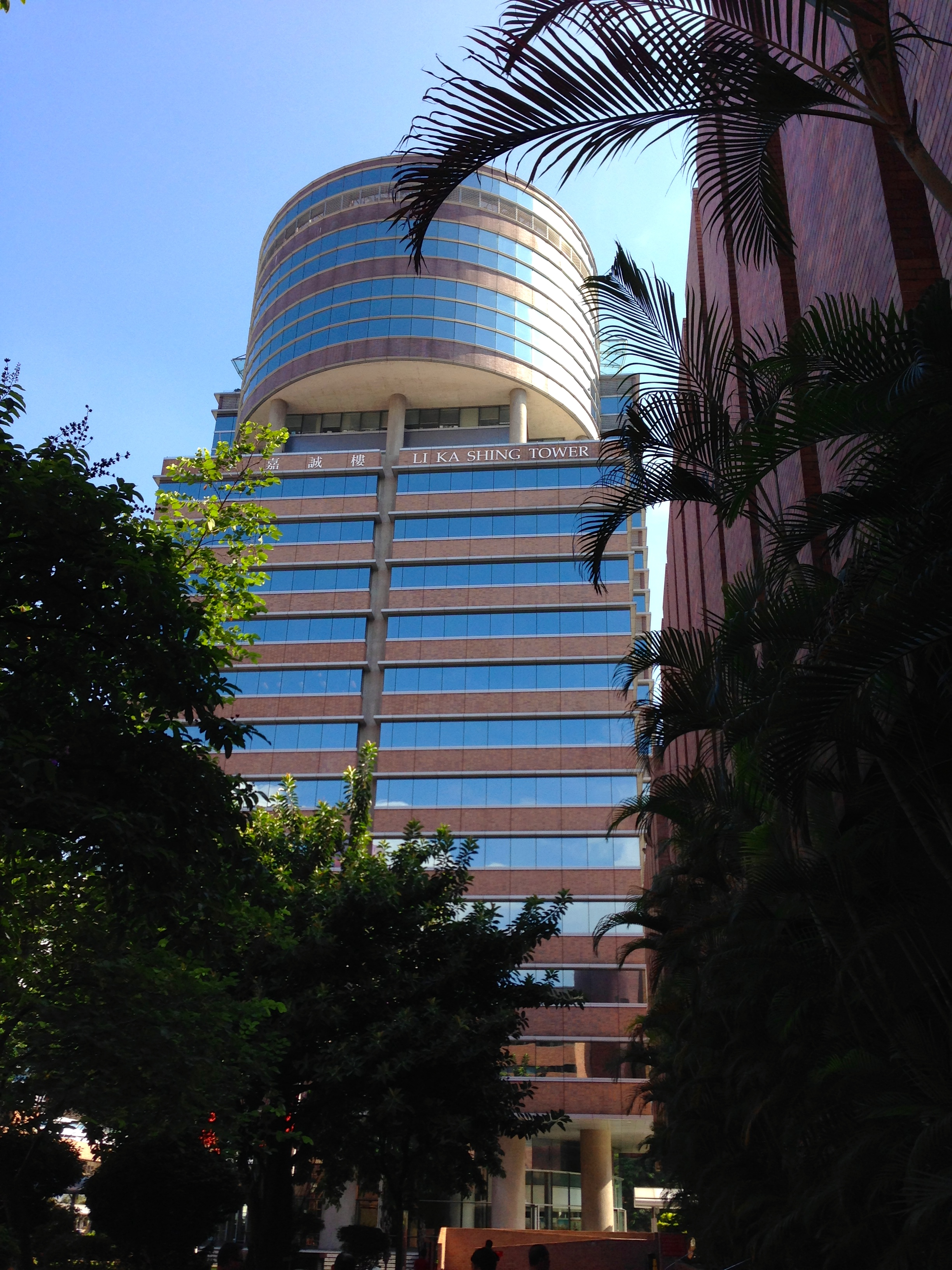
LKS Tower

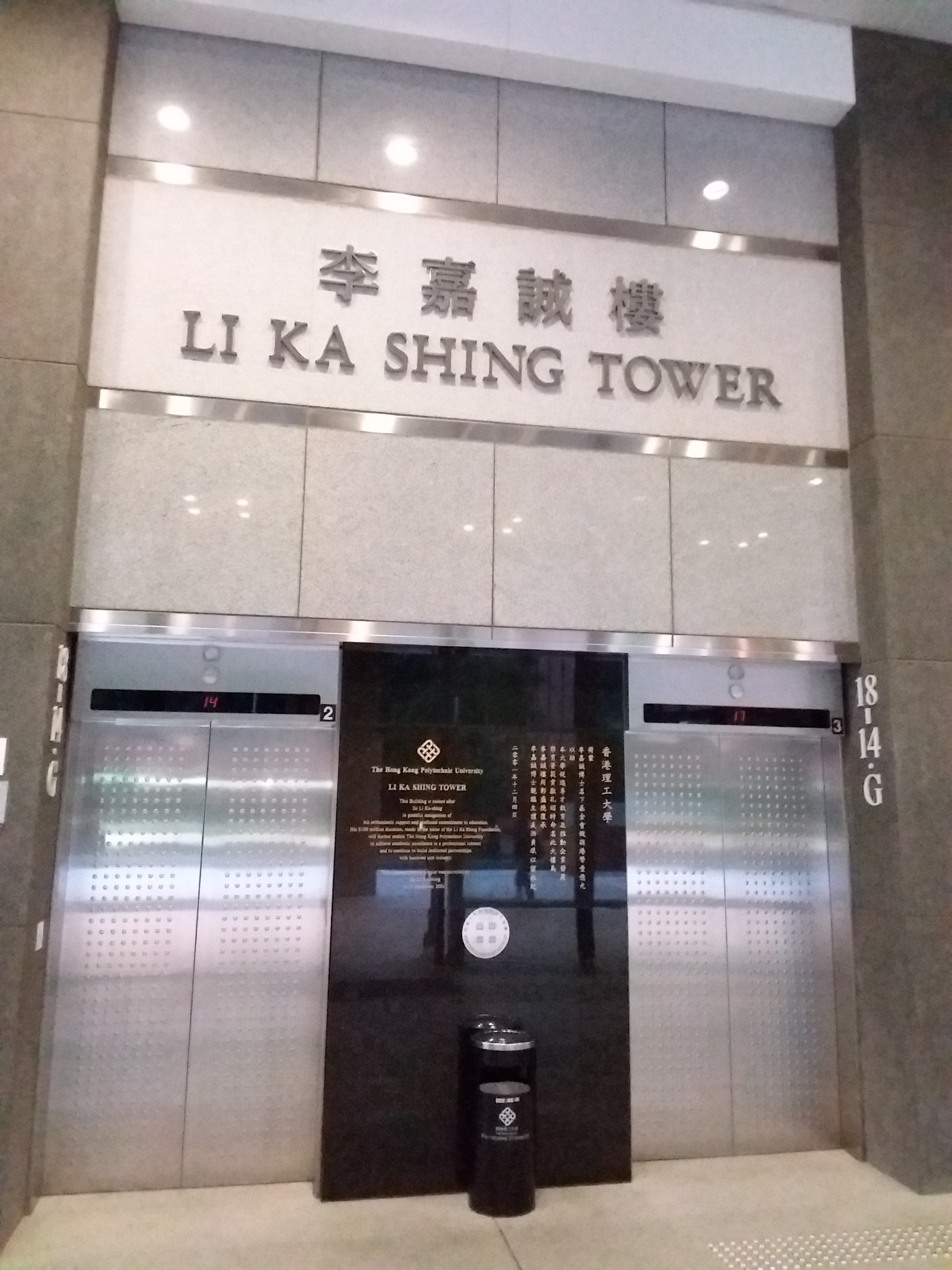
Lift Lobby, LKS Tower

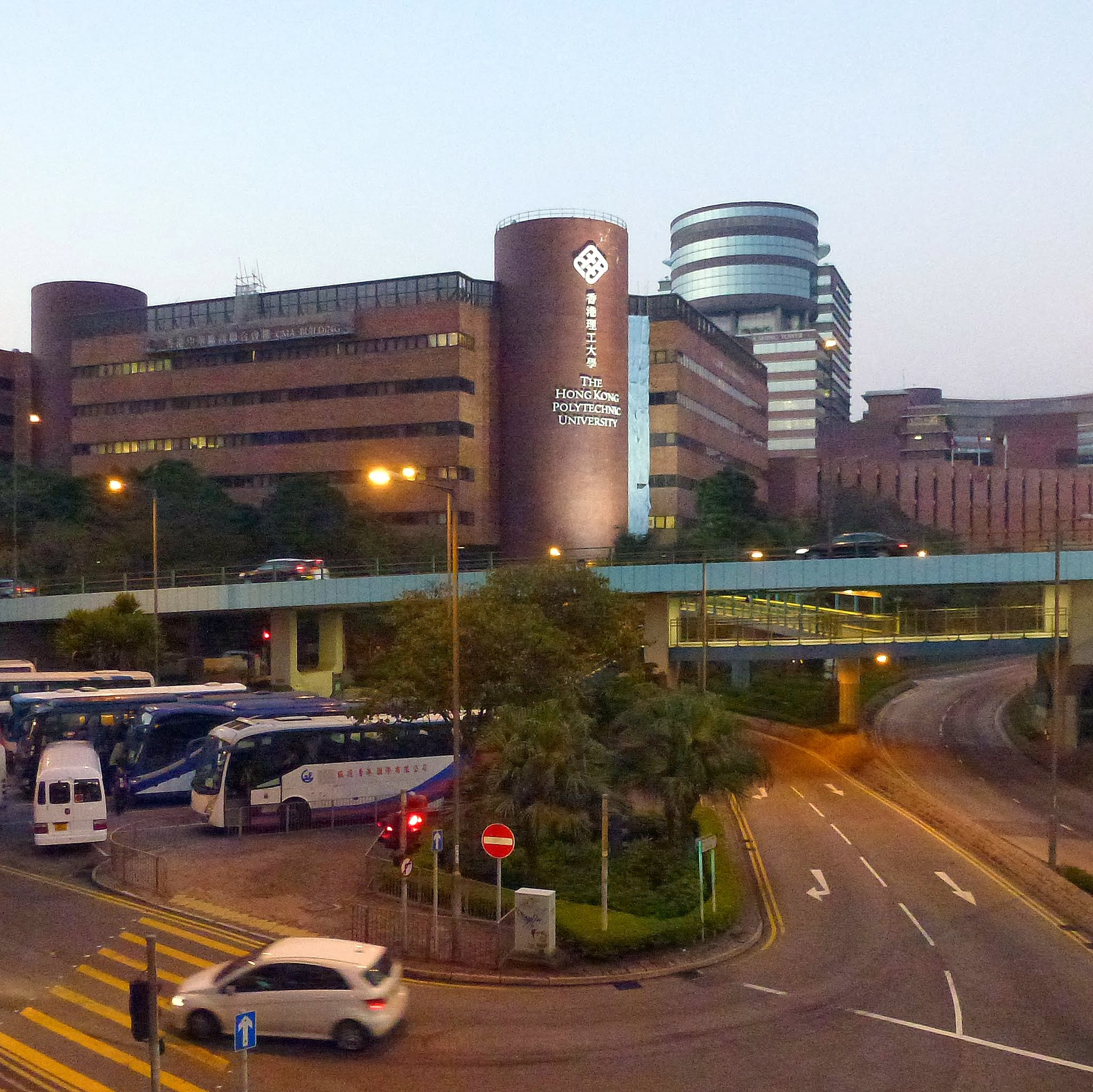
LKS Tower standing in the main campus
Block Z, Main Campus, PolyU

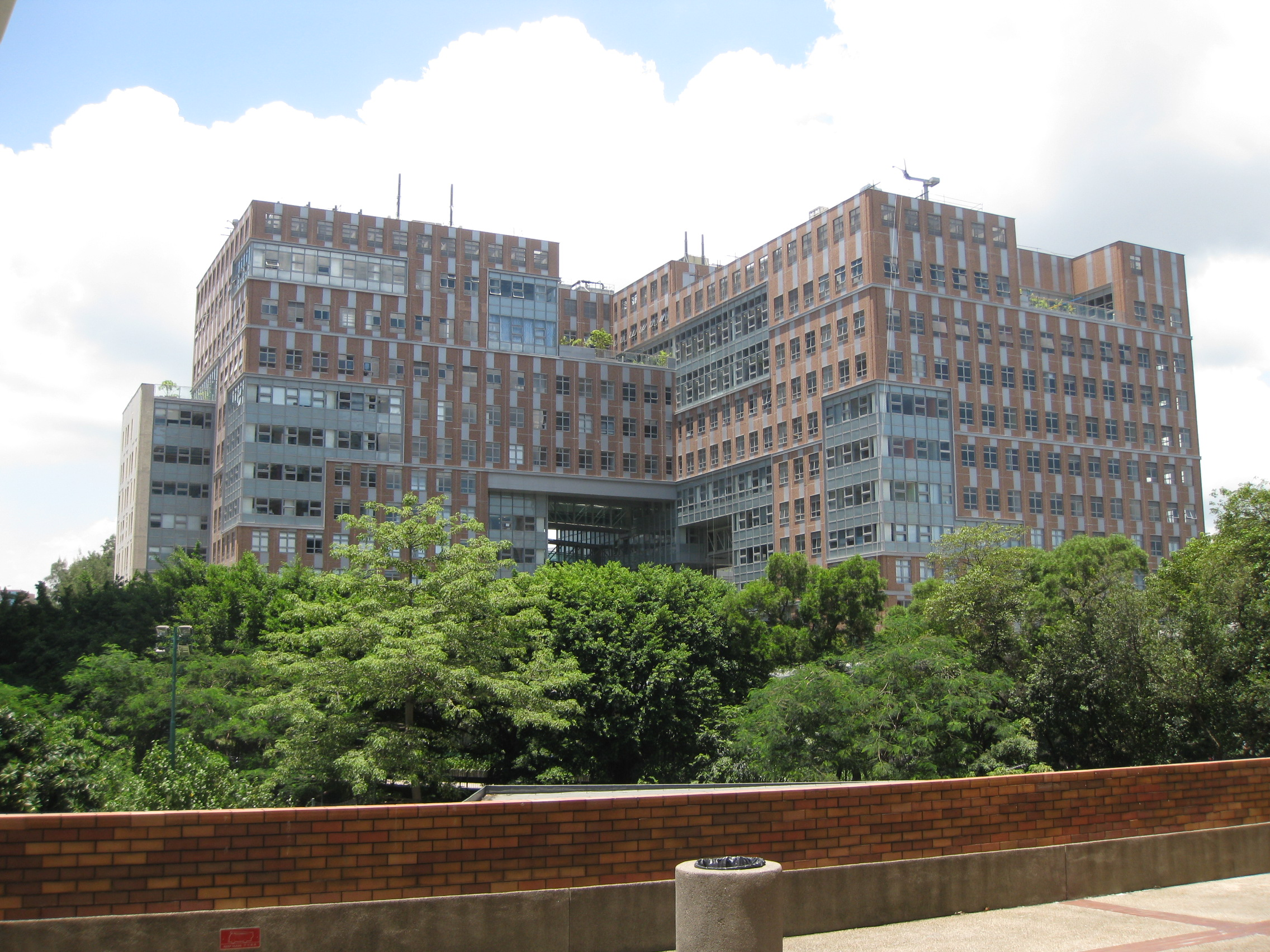
Block Z

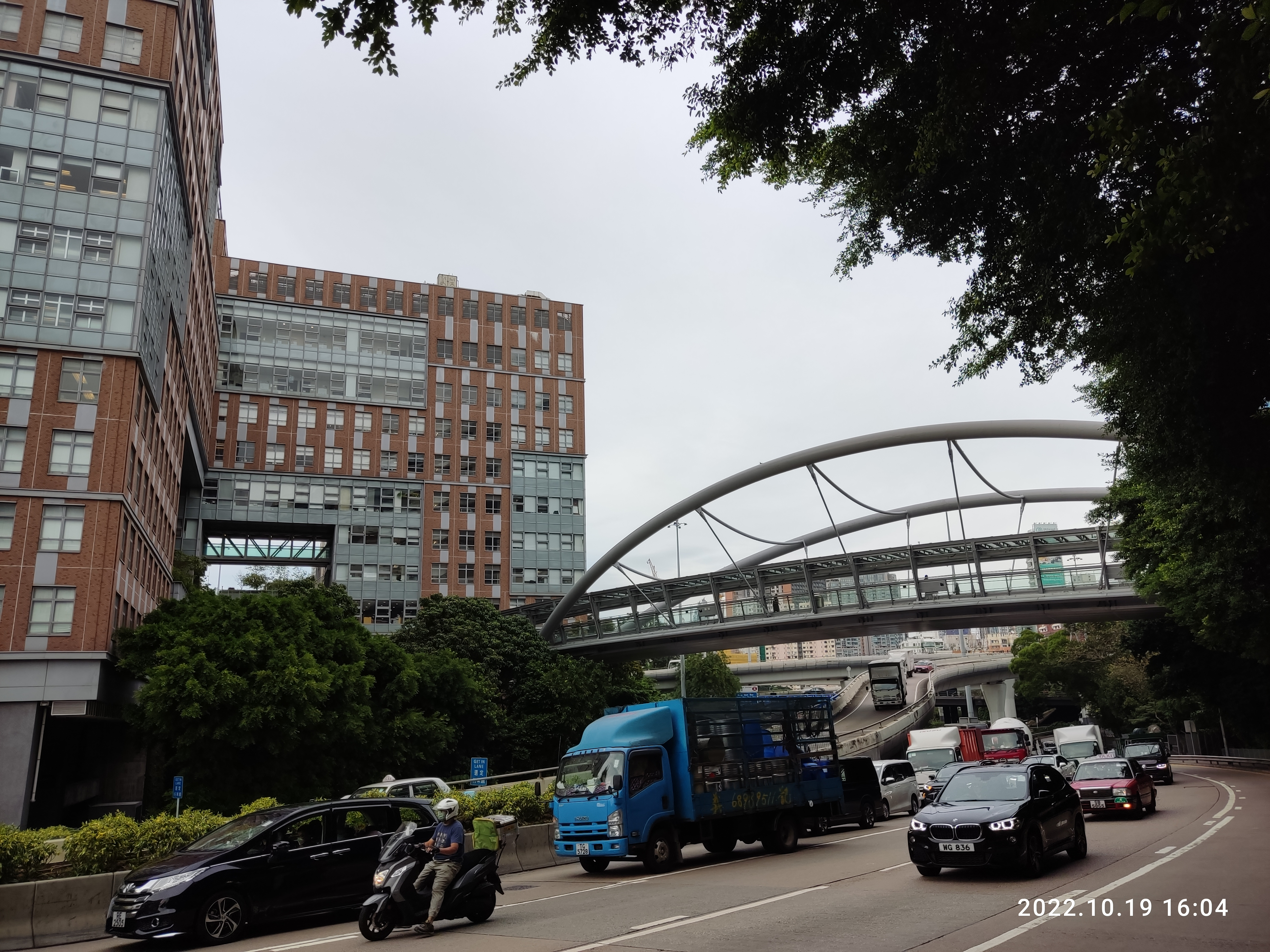
Block Z, view from Chatham Rd South, 2022

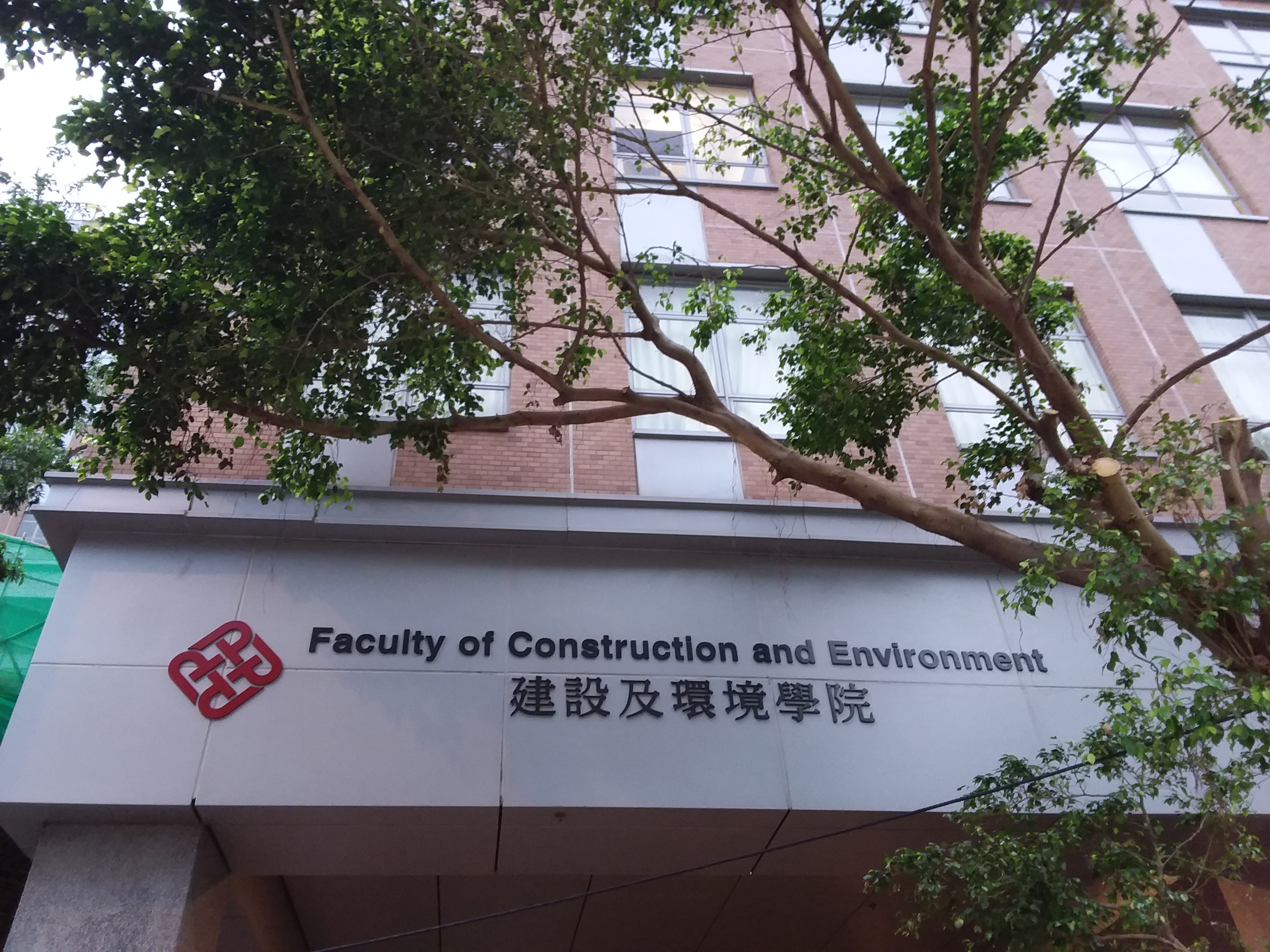
FCE, Block Z, 2018

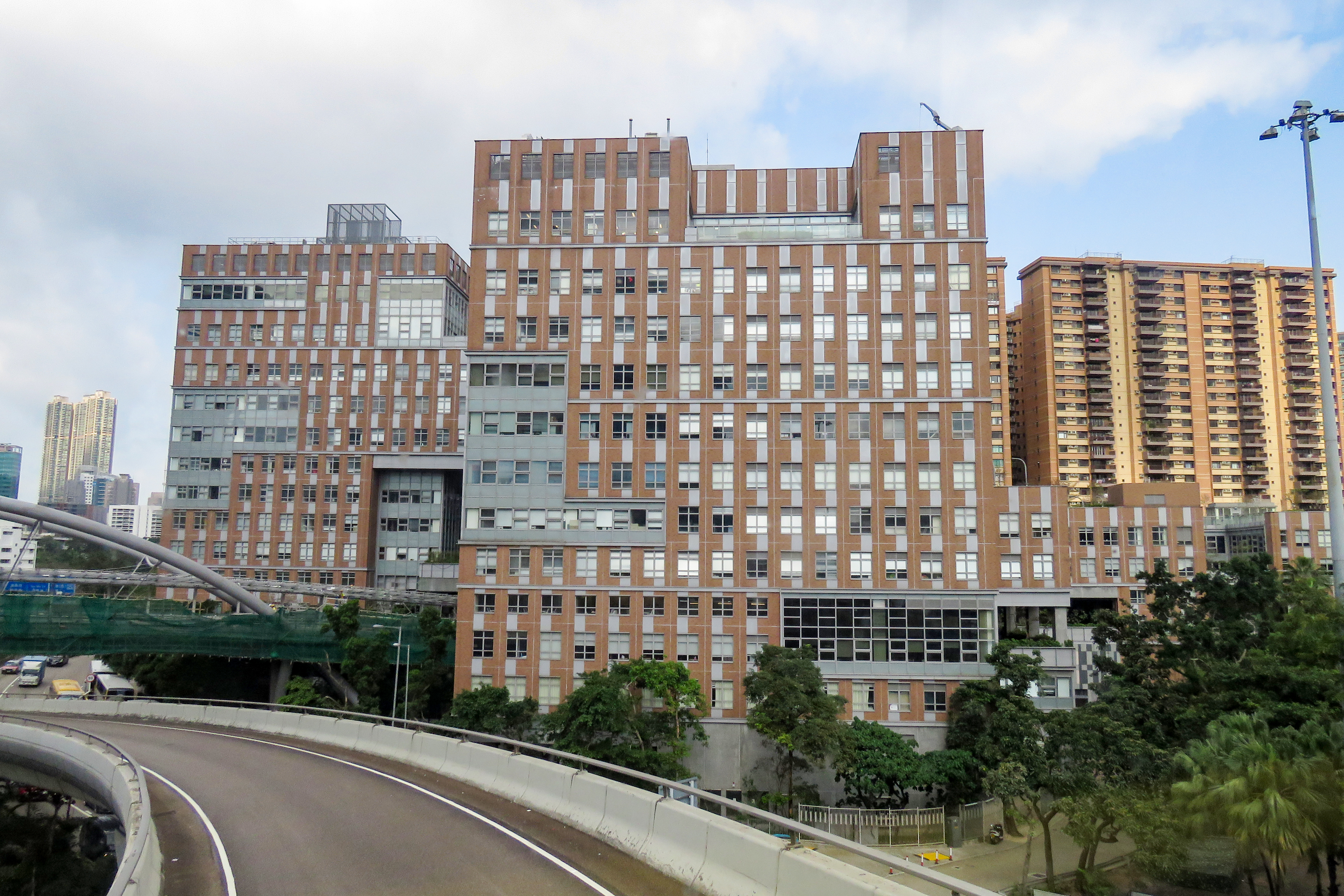
Block Z, 2019

==== Pao Yue-kong Library ====
The PolyU Library was established on 1 August 1972. Two centres operated in Hung Hom and Quarry Bay until 1976, when they eventually merged into the present building. It was named after shipping entrepreneur and philanthropist Yue-Kong Pao in 1995.

In 2024, there were over 9.38 million of library holdings in total, with more than 8 million electronic resources. The six-storey library provides 3,900 study spaces and is equipped with a 24-hour study centre and audio-visual information areas. In 2017, the 3/F and 4/F of the library was transformed into the "i-space" which contains services such as VR Experience Zone, Internet of Things (IoT), Laser Cutting / Engraving, 3D Scanning, Book Scanning, Large Format Printing, Vinyl Cutting and 3D Printing. Video production facilities such as the One button studio and Digital Studio are also available on the 3/F. The new top floor (6/F) opened on 4 July 2022, providing a student-centred space for collaborative learning and quiet study.

Pao Yue-kong Library, Main Campus, PolyU

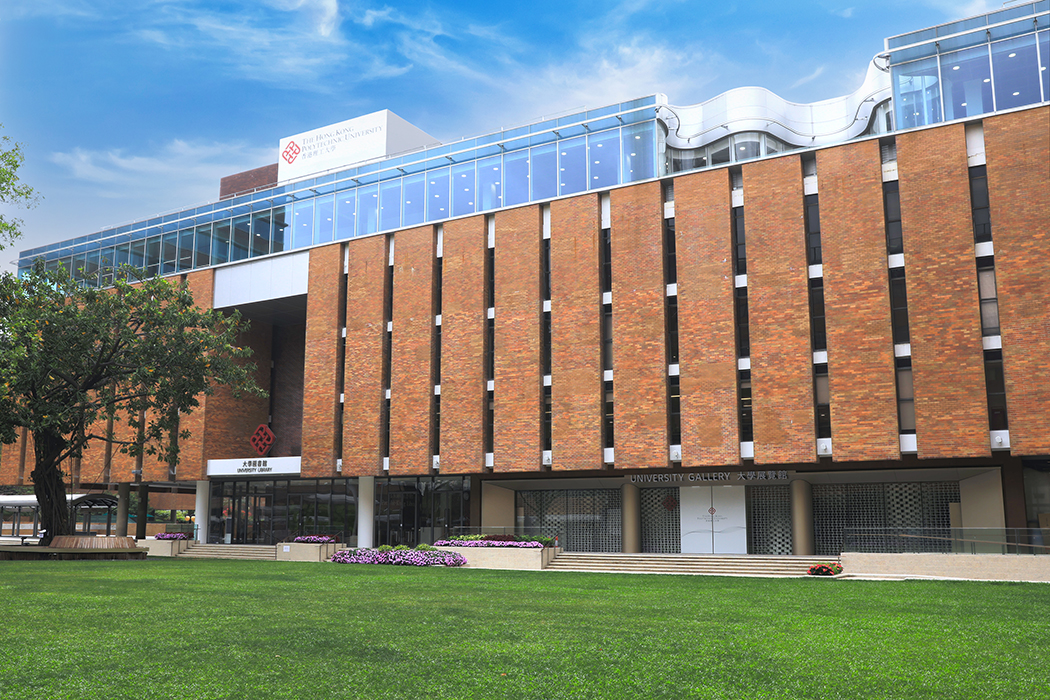
Exterior of PYK Library, 2022

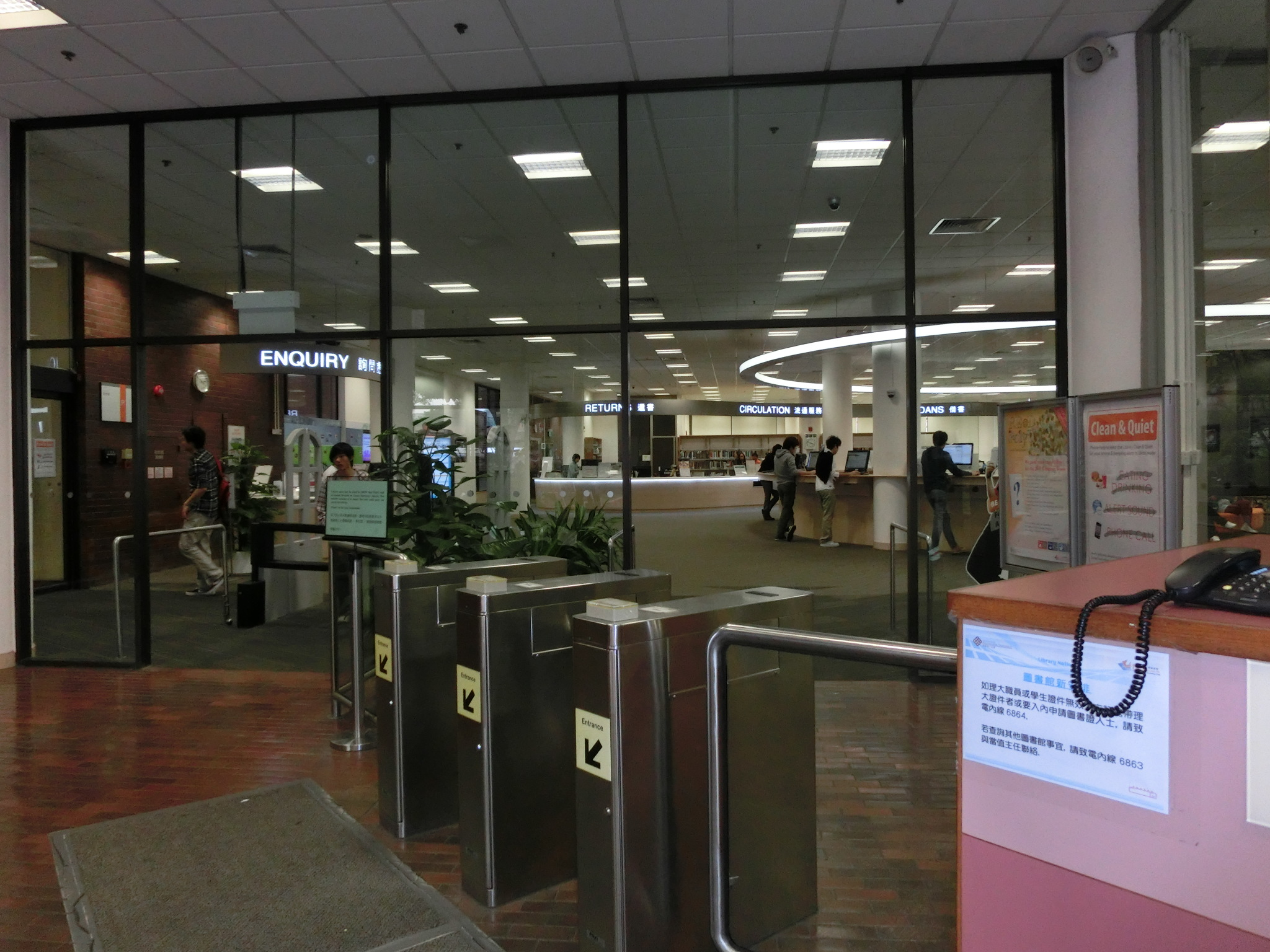
Gate Entrance, PYK Library, 2013

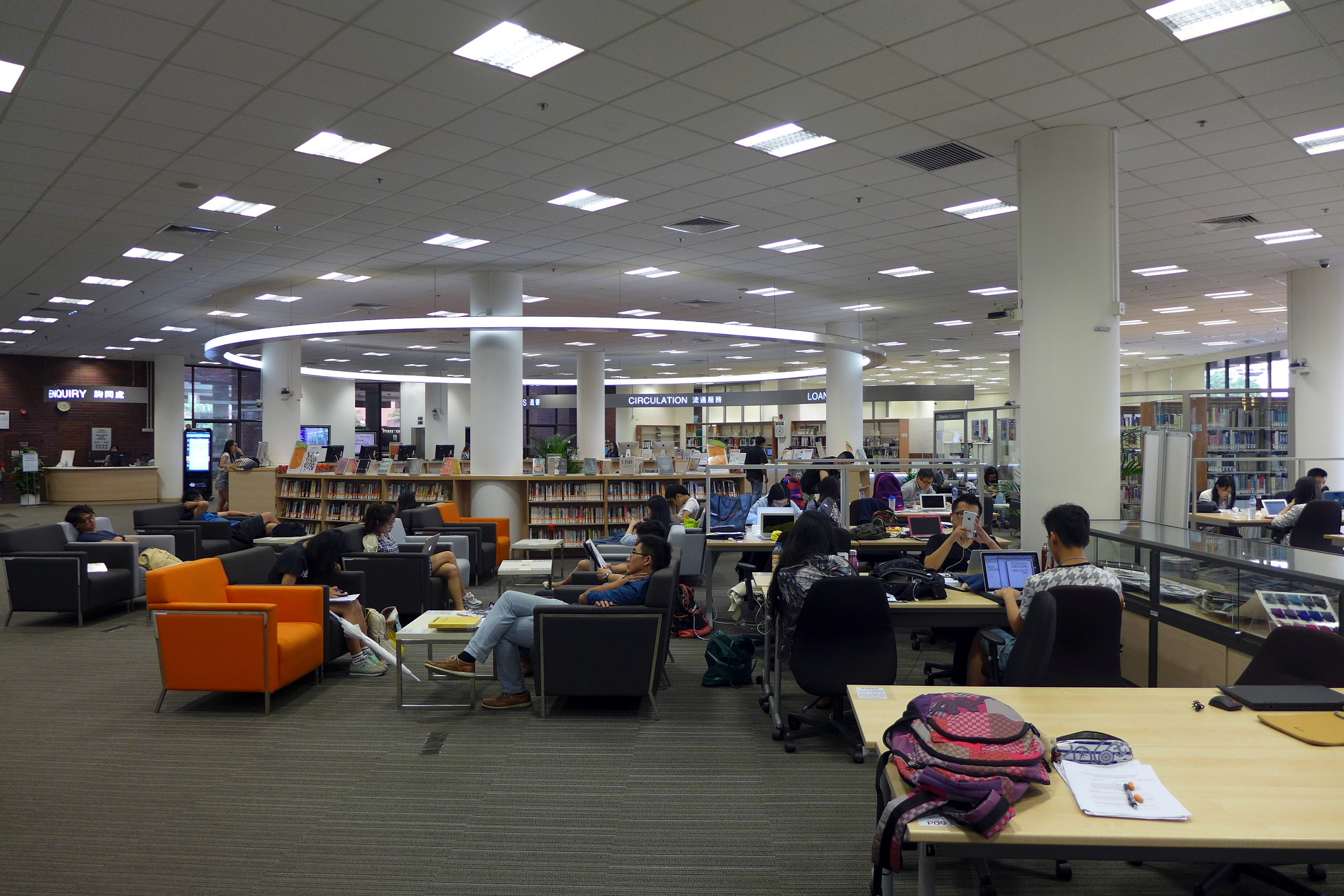
PF, PYK Library, 2015

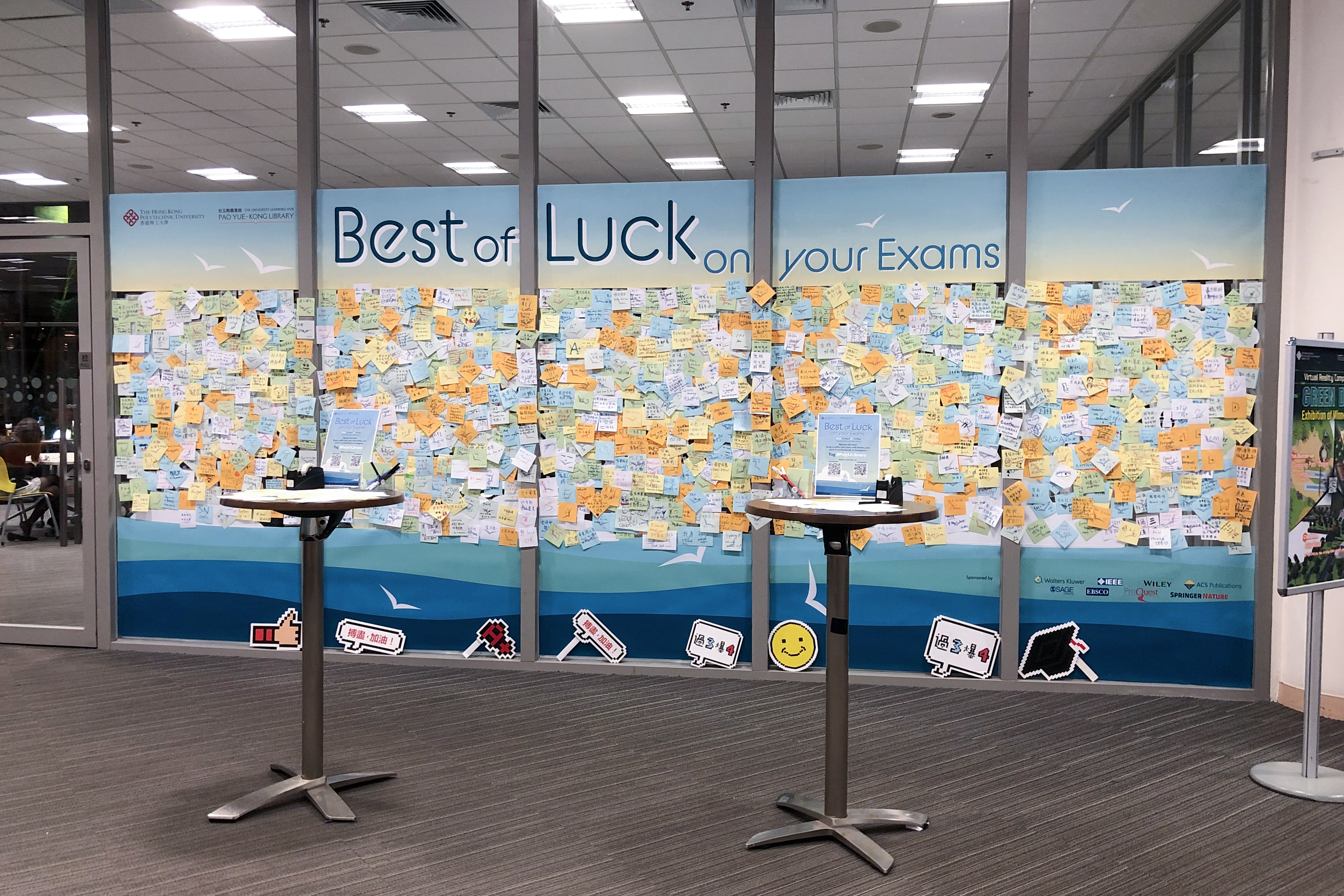
Exam Wishing Wall, PYK Library, 2019

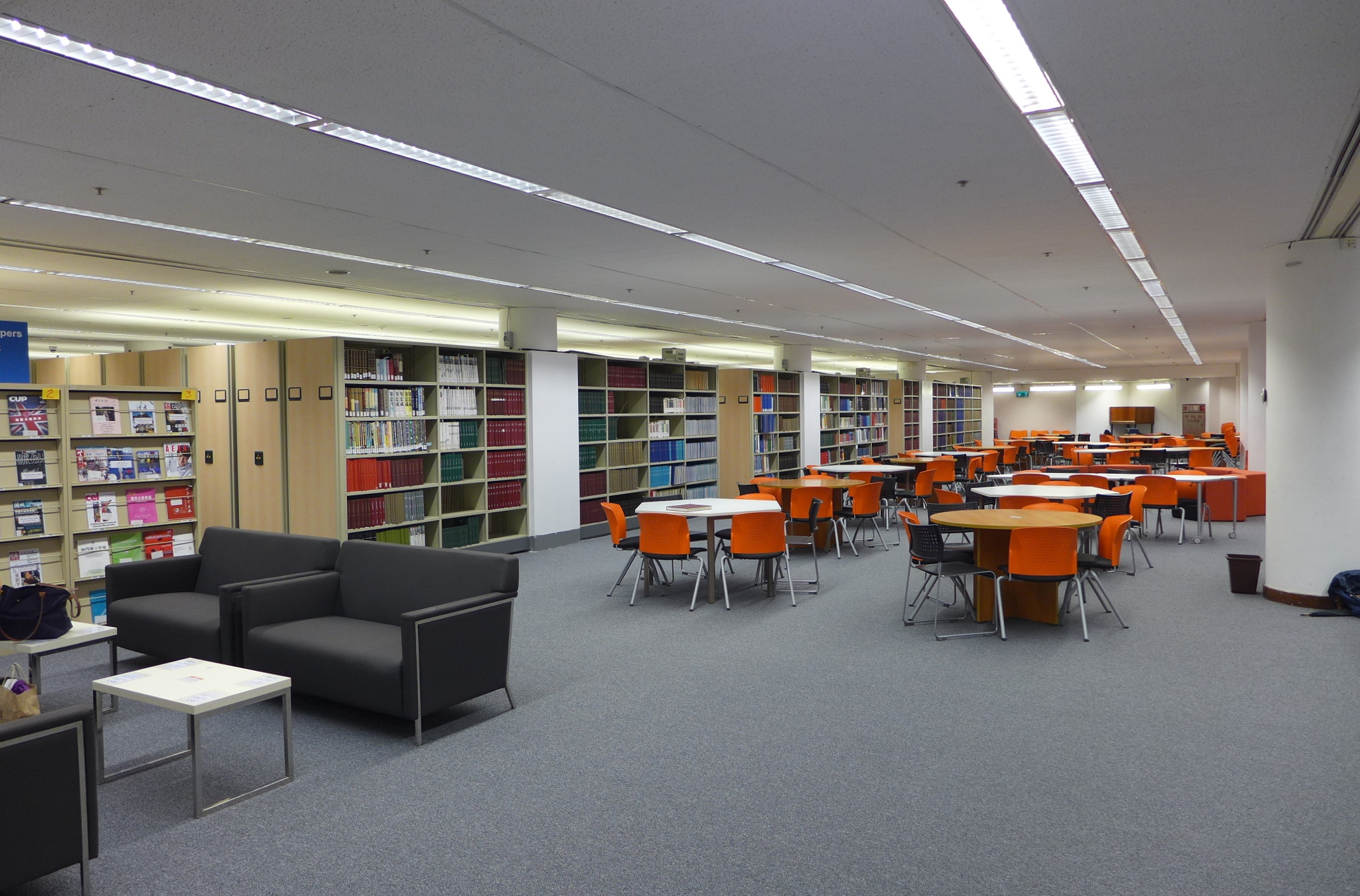
GF Discussion Zone, PYK Library

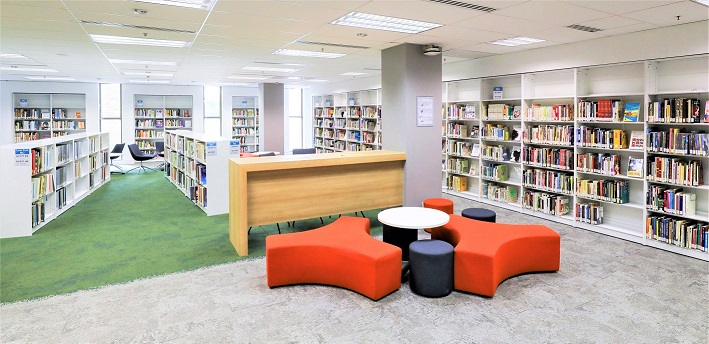
3-F, PYK Library, 2025

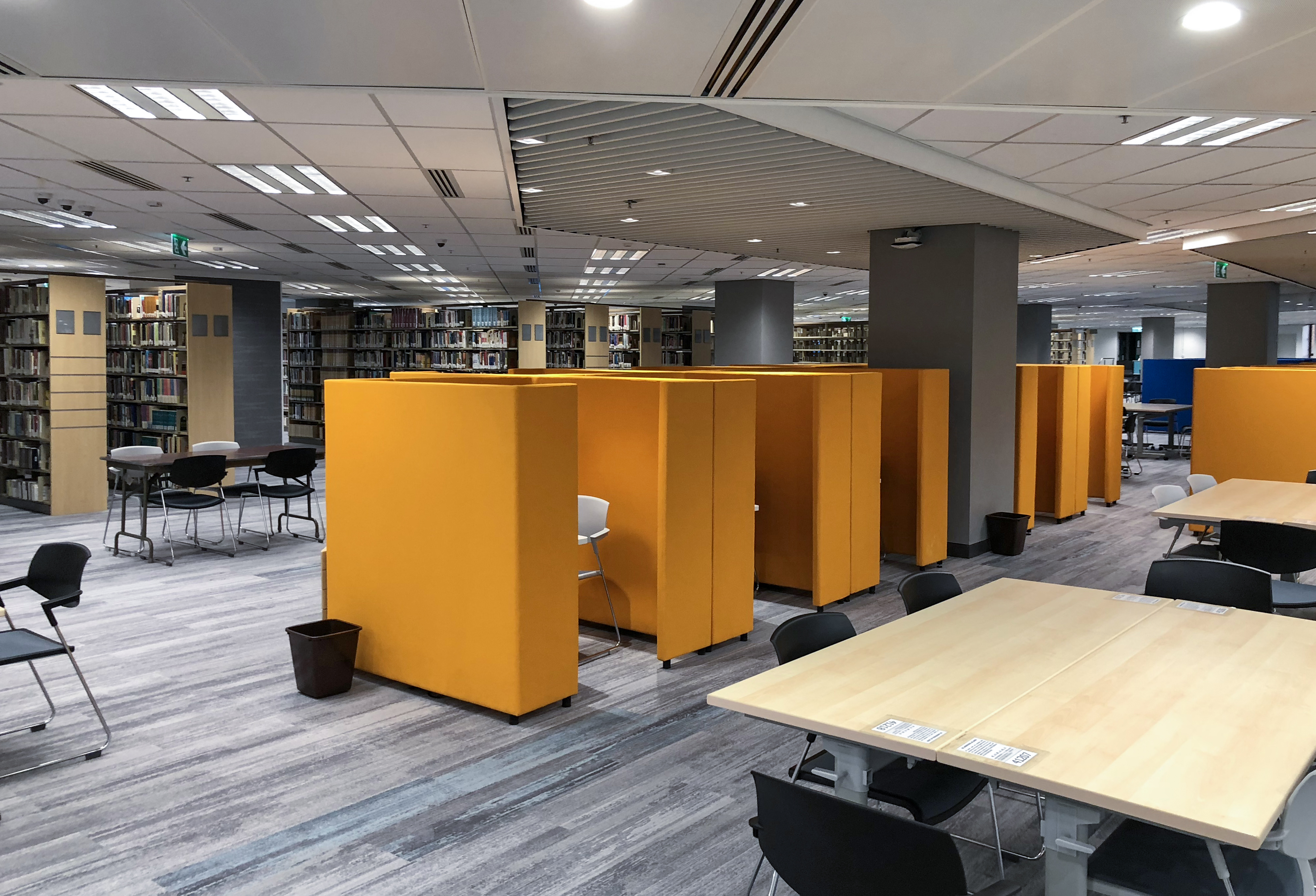
5F, PYK Library

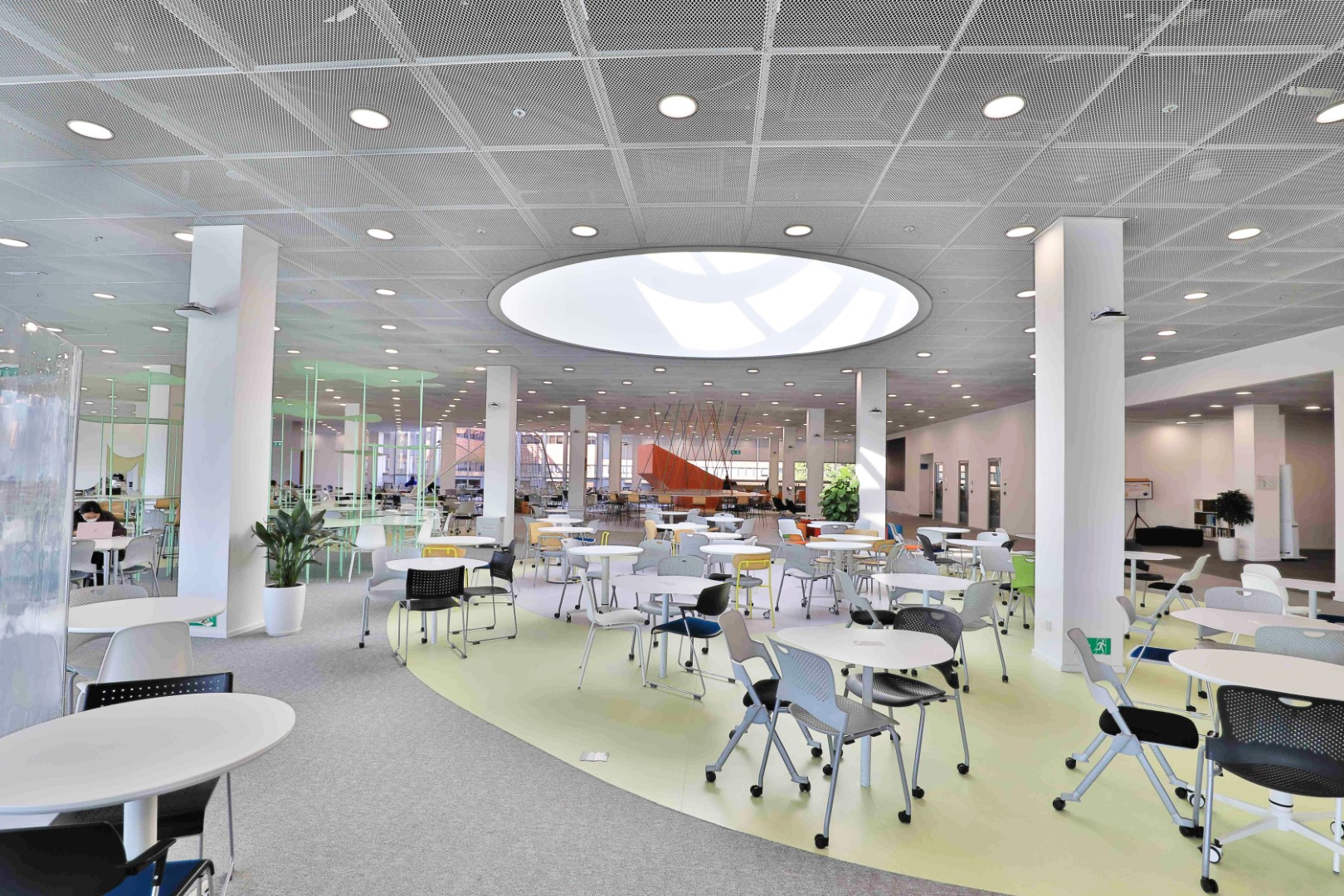
6-F, PYK Library, 2025

==== Innovation Tower ====
The Innovation Tower, designed by Zaha Hadid, is located on the northwestern side of the university's main campus. This 15-story building provides 15,000 square meters of net floor area. It houses facilities for the School of Design, including exhibition areas, multi-functional classrooms and lecture theatres, design studios and workshops, as well as a communal lounge. The School of Design has been ranked among the best design schools worldwide.

Jockey Club Innovation Tower (School of Design), Main Campus, PolyU

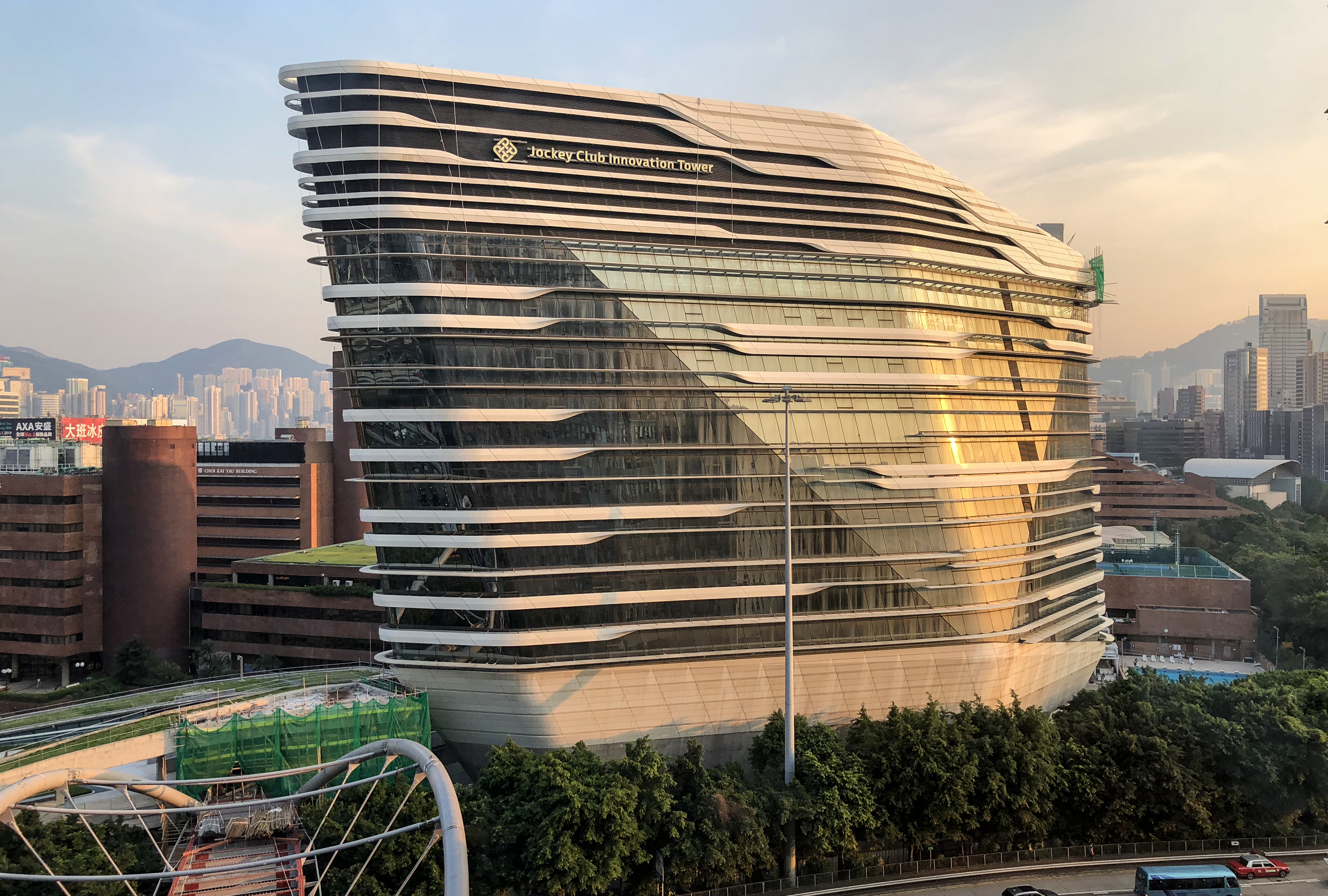
Jockey Club Innovation Tower

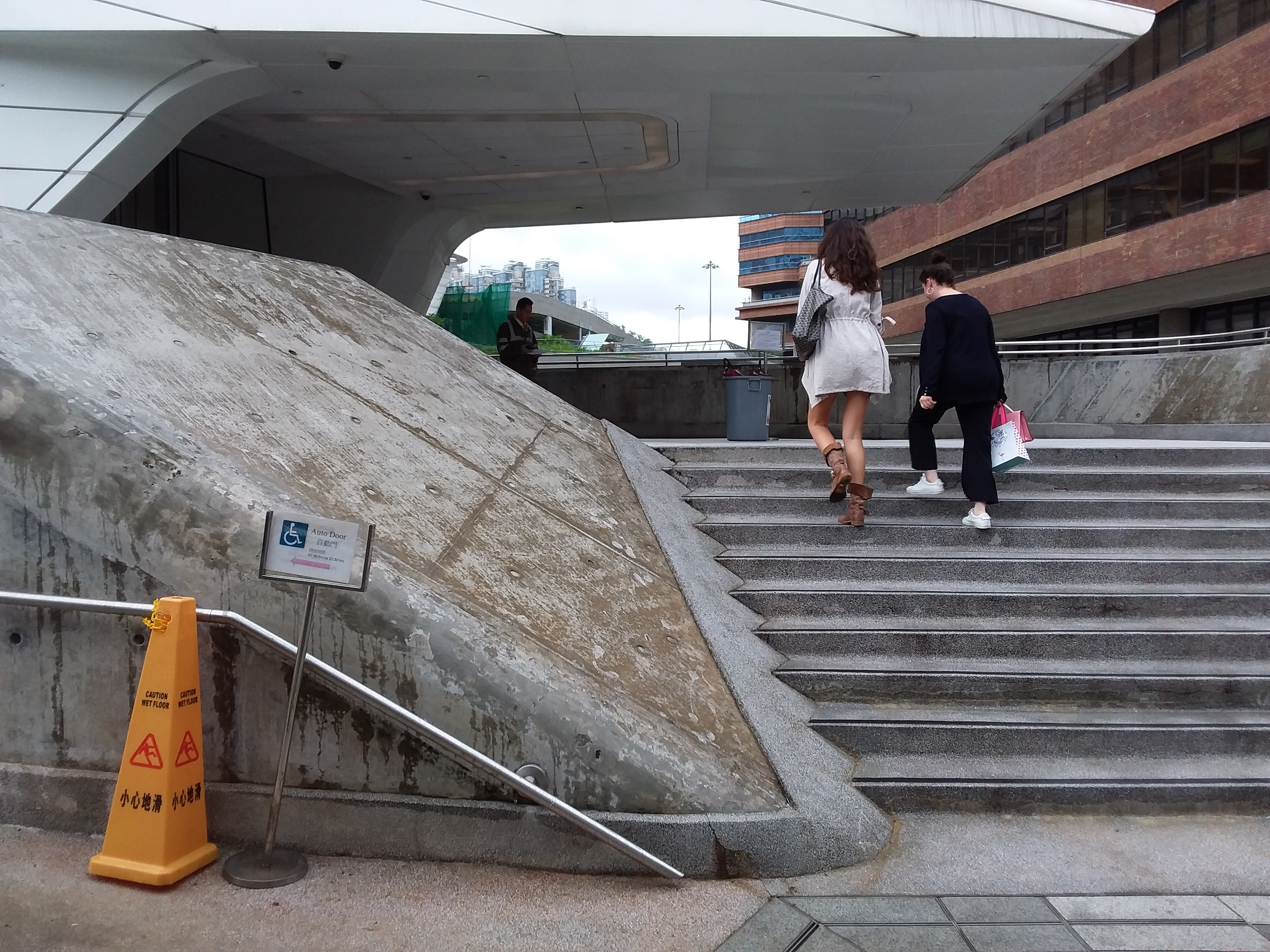
Jockey Club Innovation Tower

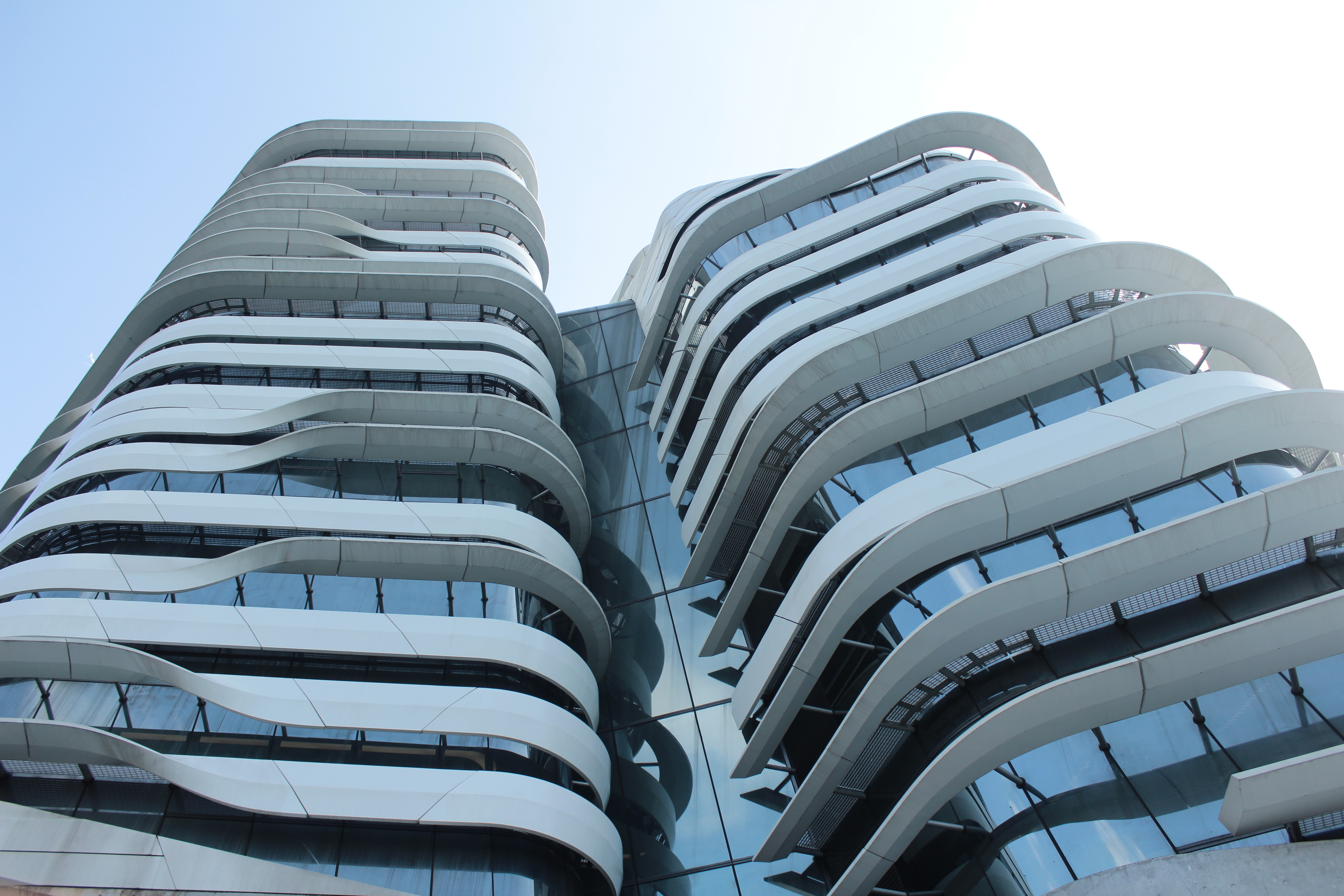
Jockey Club Innovation Tower

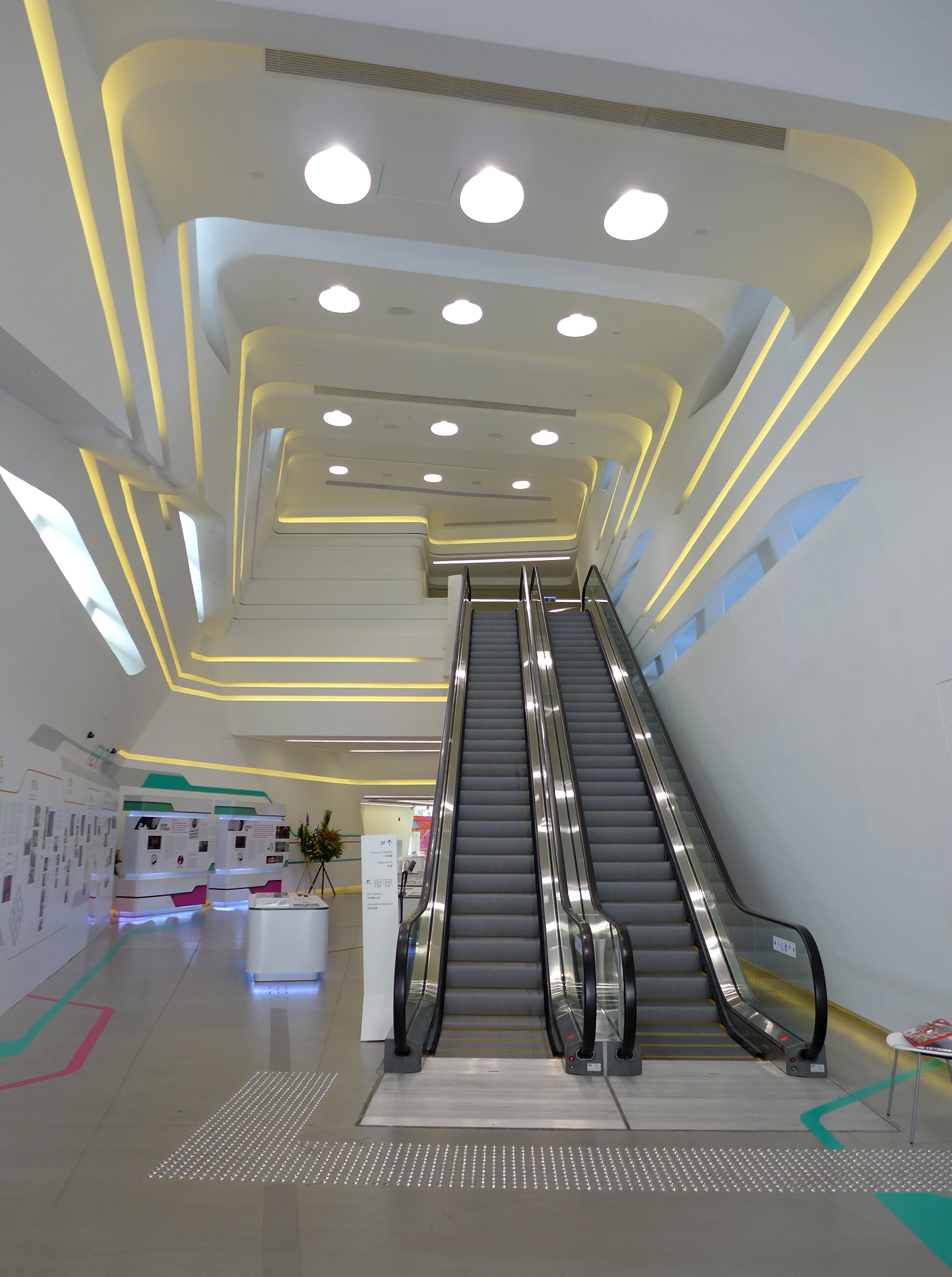
Jockey Club Innovation Tower interior

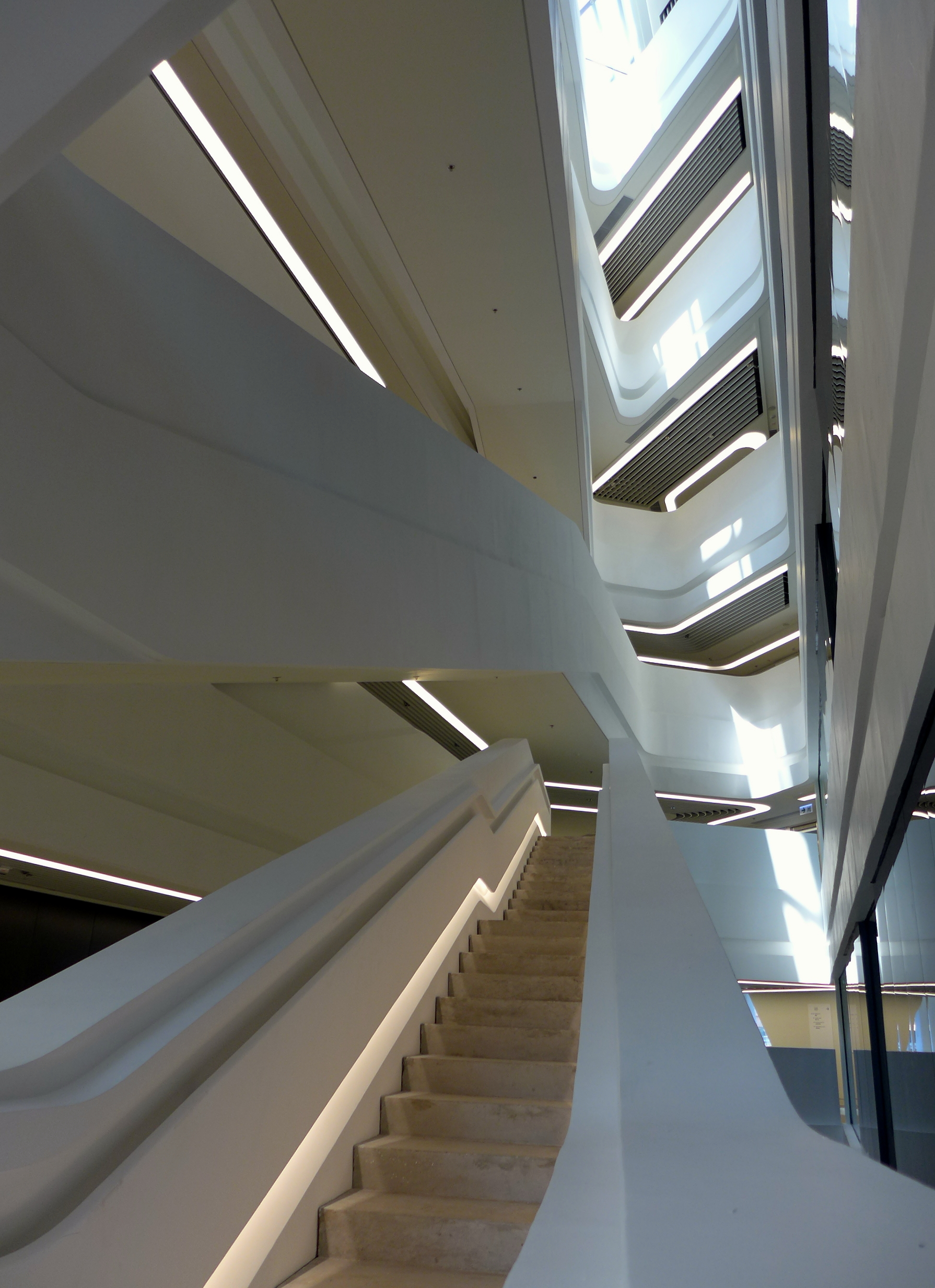
Jockey Club Innovation Tower interior

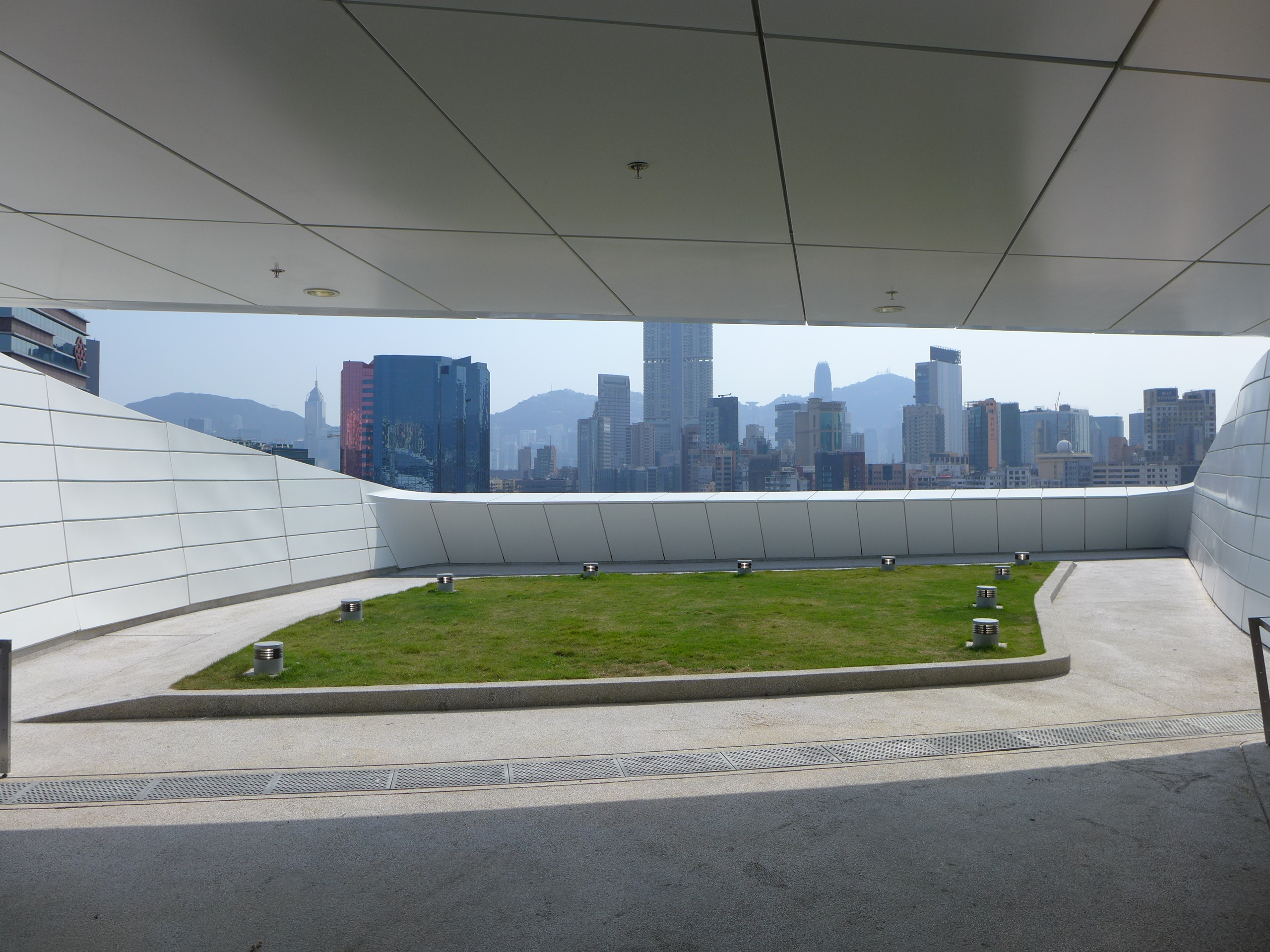
Jockey Club Innovation Tower podium

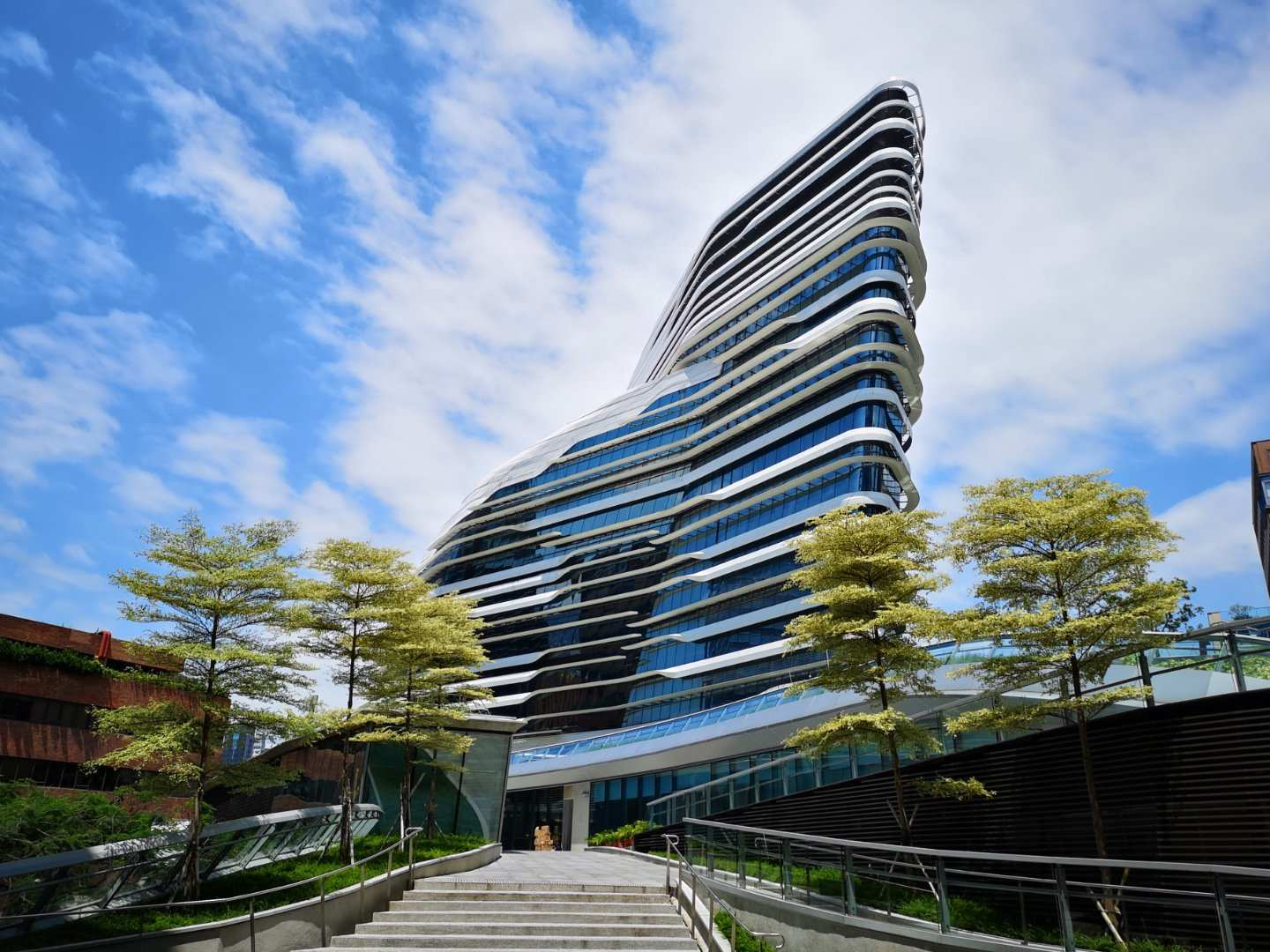
Jockey Club Innovation Tower and Block X

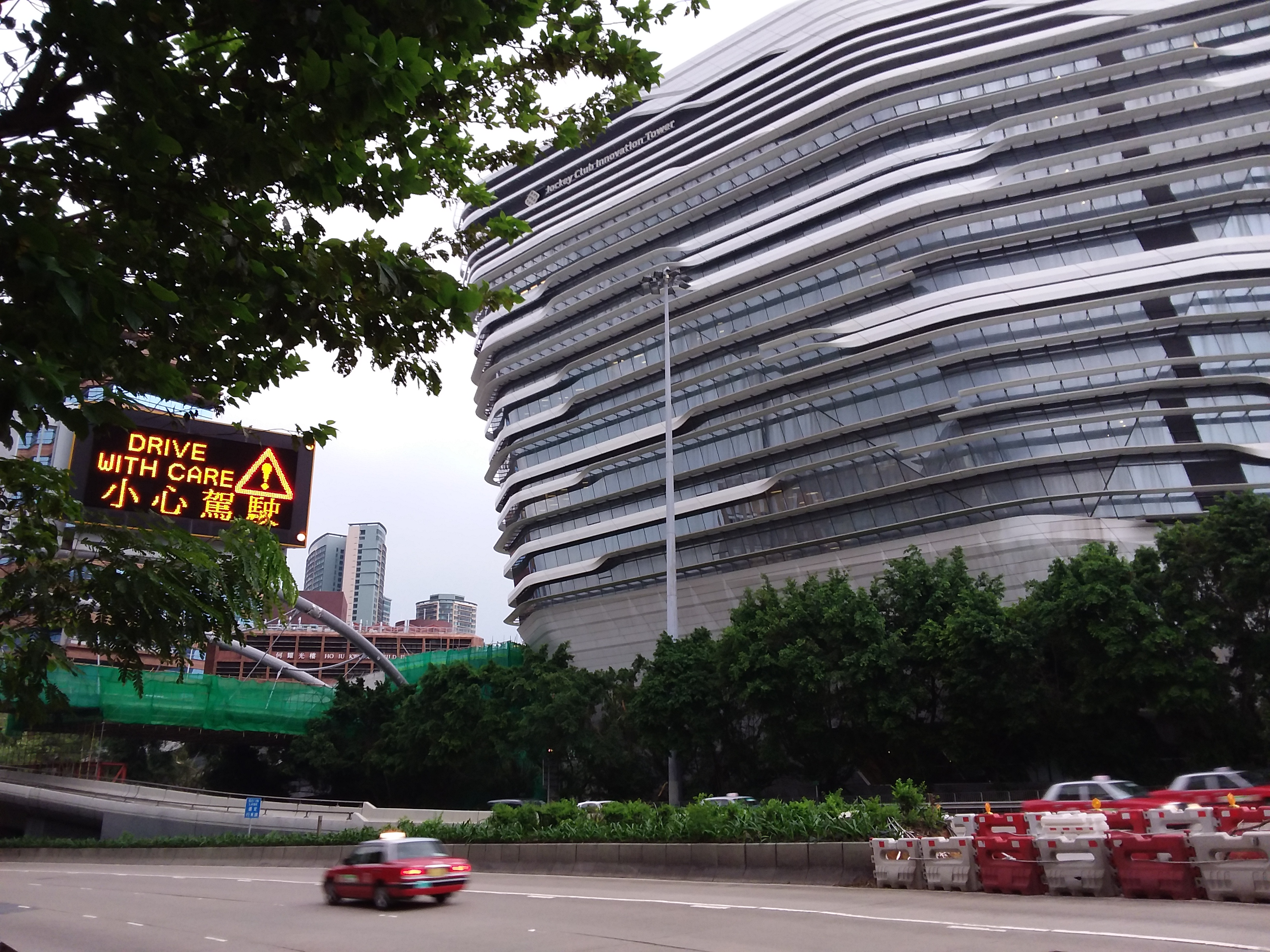
Jockey Club Innovation Tower, view from the Chatham Rd South 2018

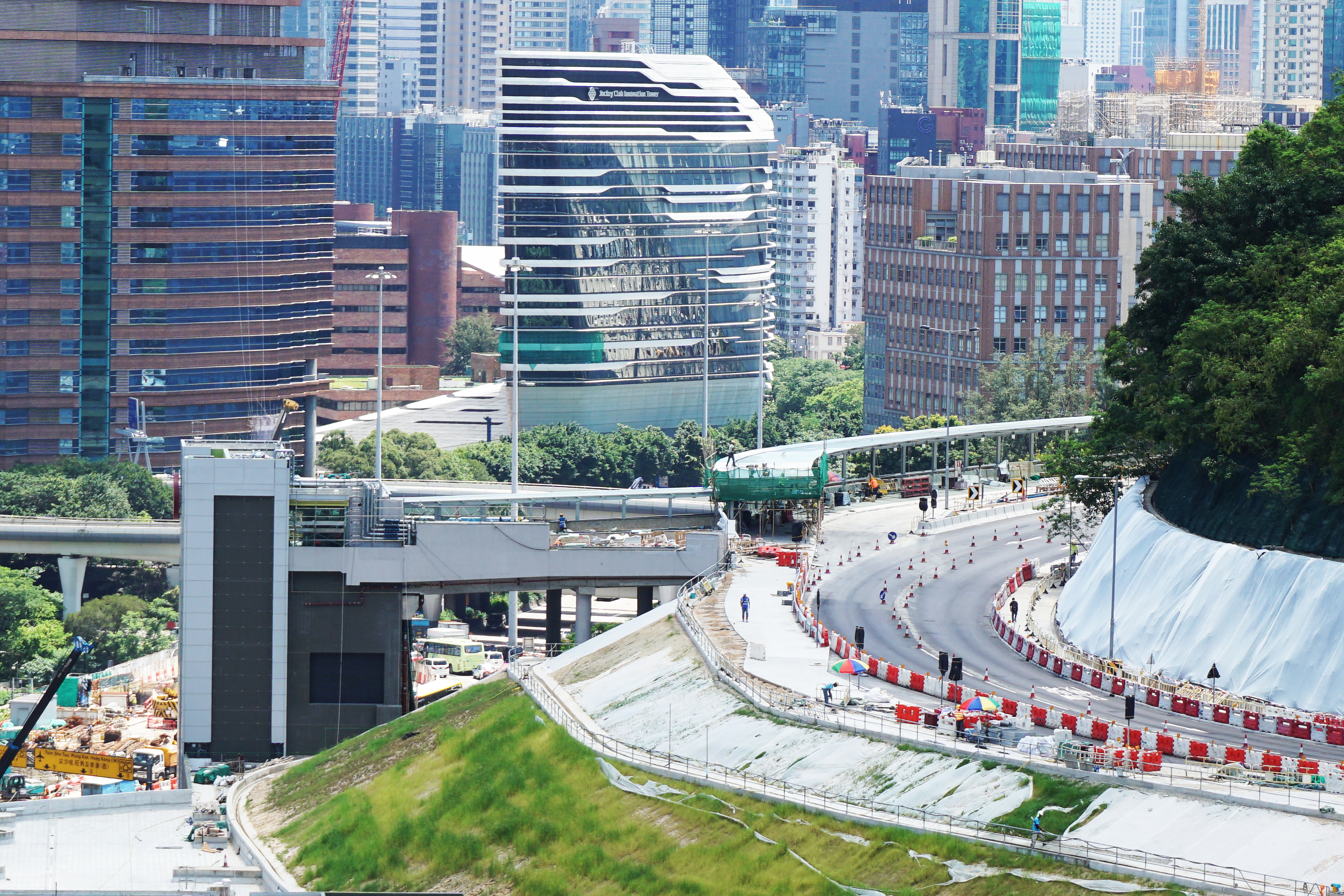
Jockey Club Innovation Tower 2016

=== Teaching and research hotel ===
The Hotel ICON was officially opened on 21 September 2011. The hotel is wholly owned by the university as a teaching and research hotel of the School of Hotel and Tourism Management (SHTM). SHTM has consistently been ranked among the top hotel and tourism management schools in the world.

Hotel ICON (School of Hotel and Tourism Management)

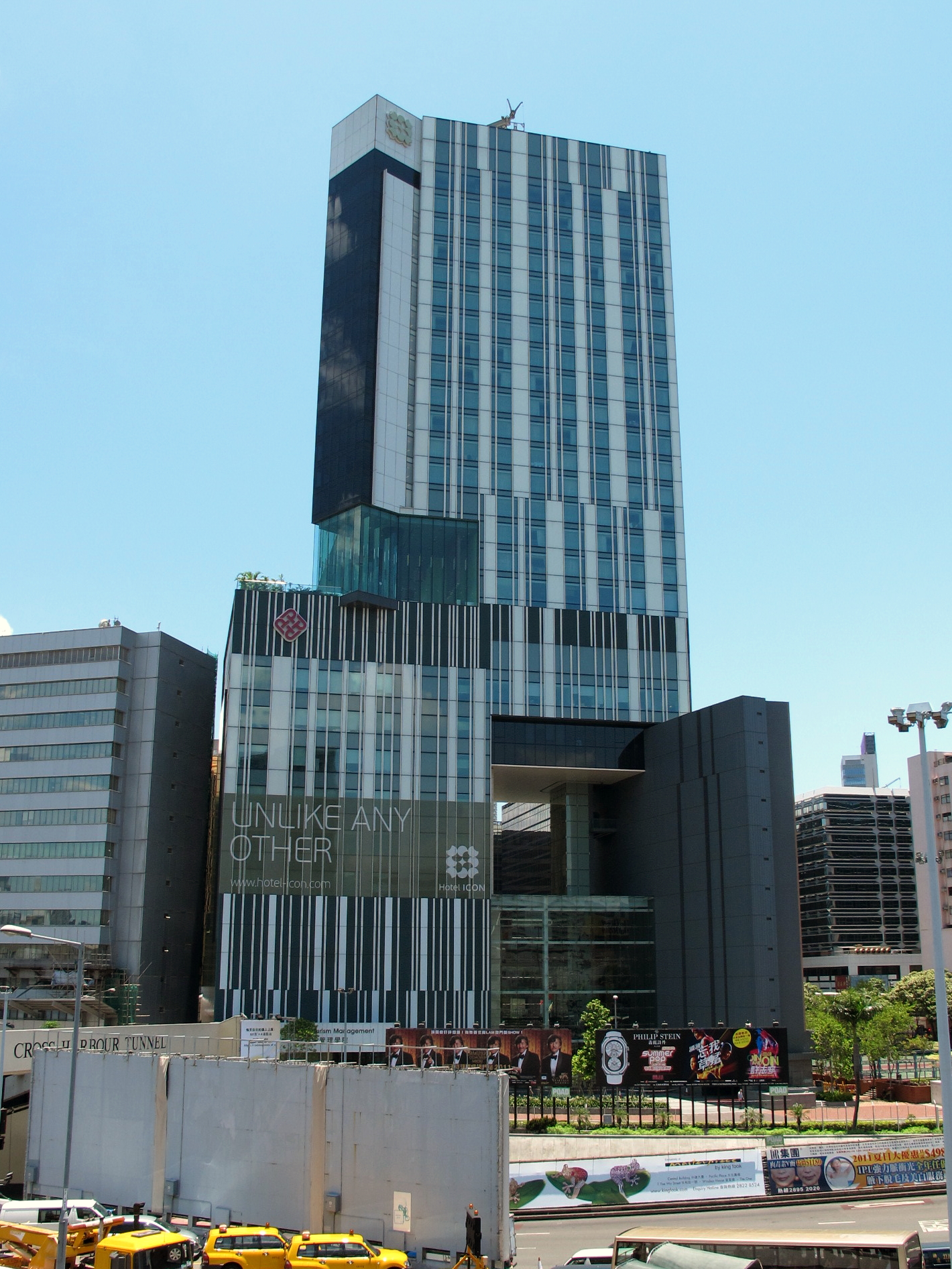
Hotel ICON

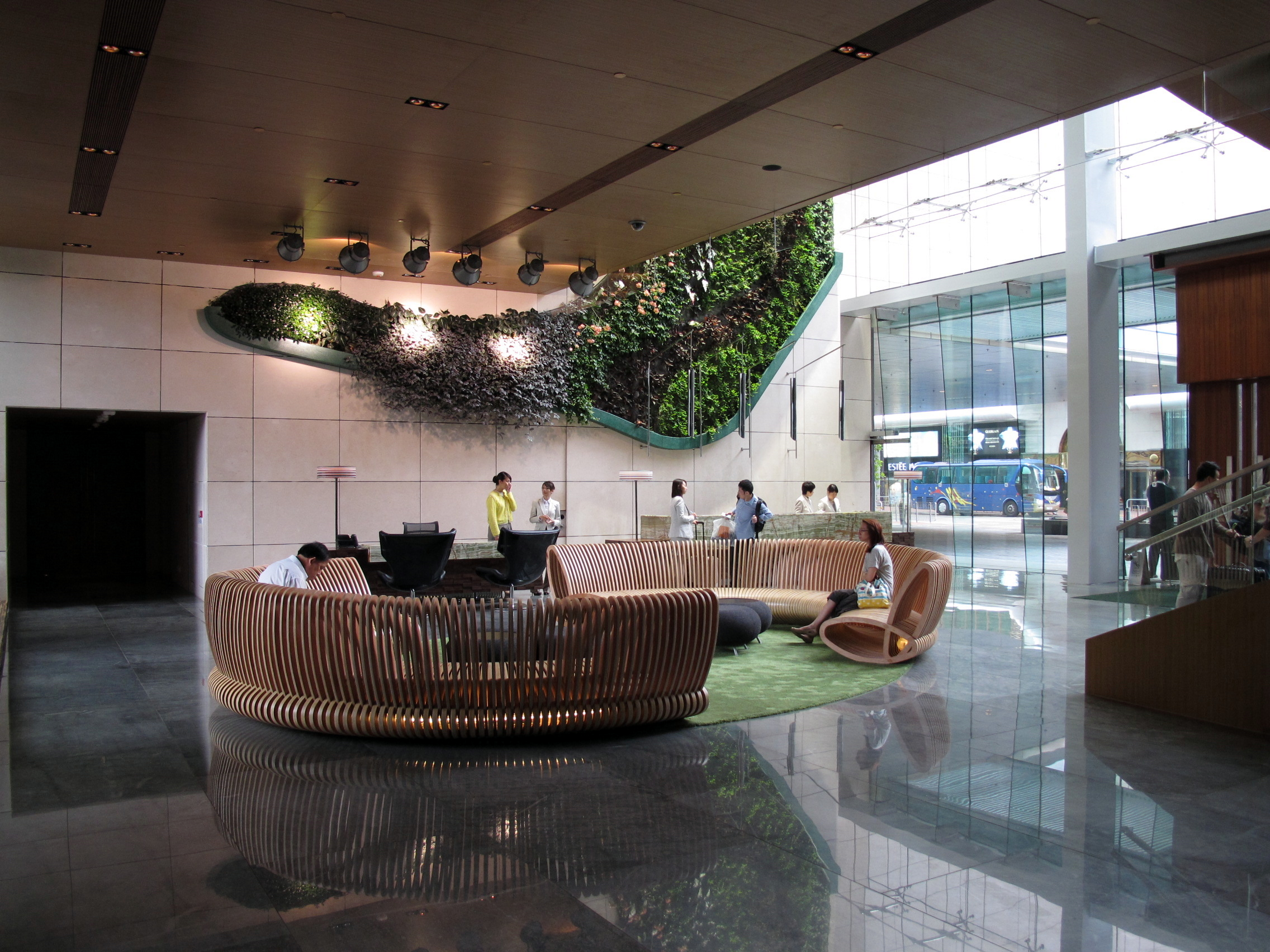
Hotel ICON Lobby View1 201106

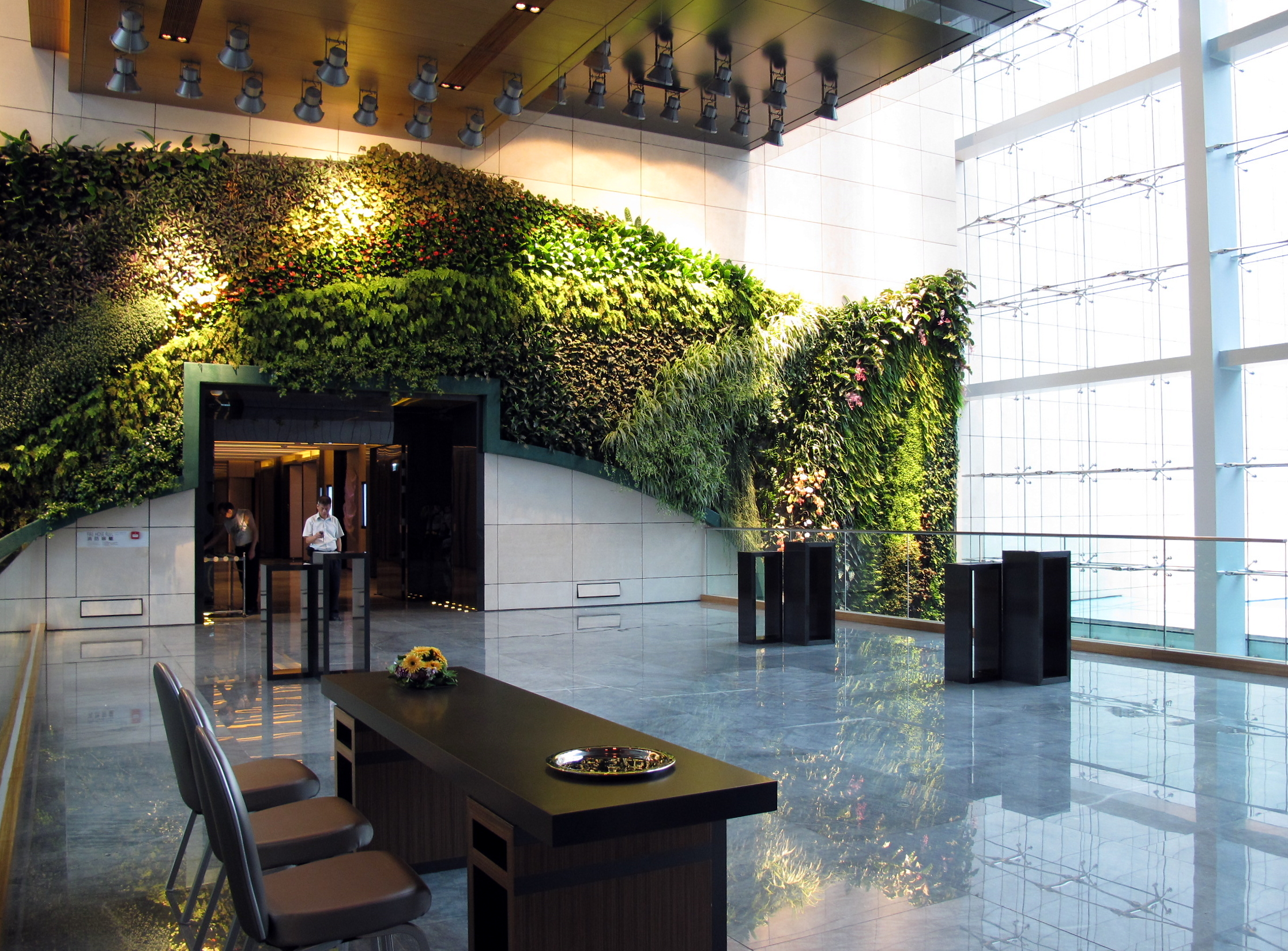
Hotel ICON Lobby View2 20110

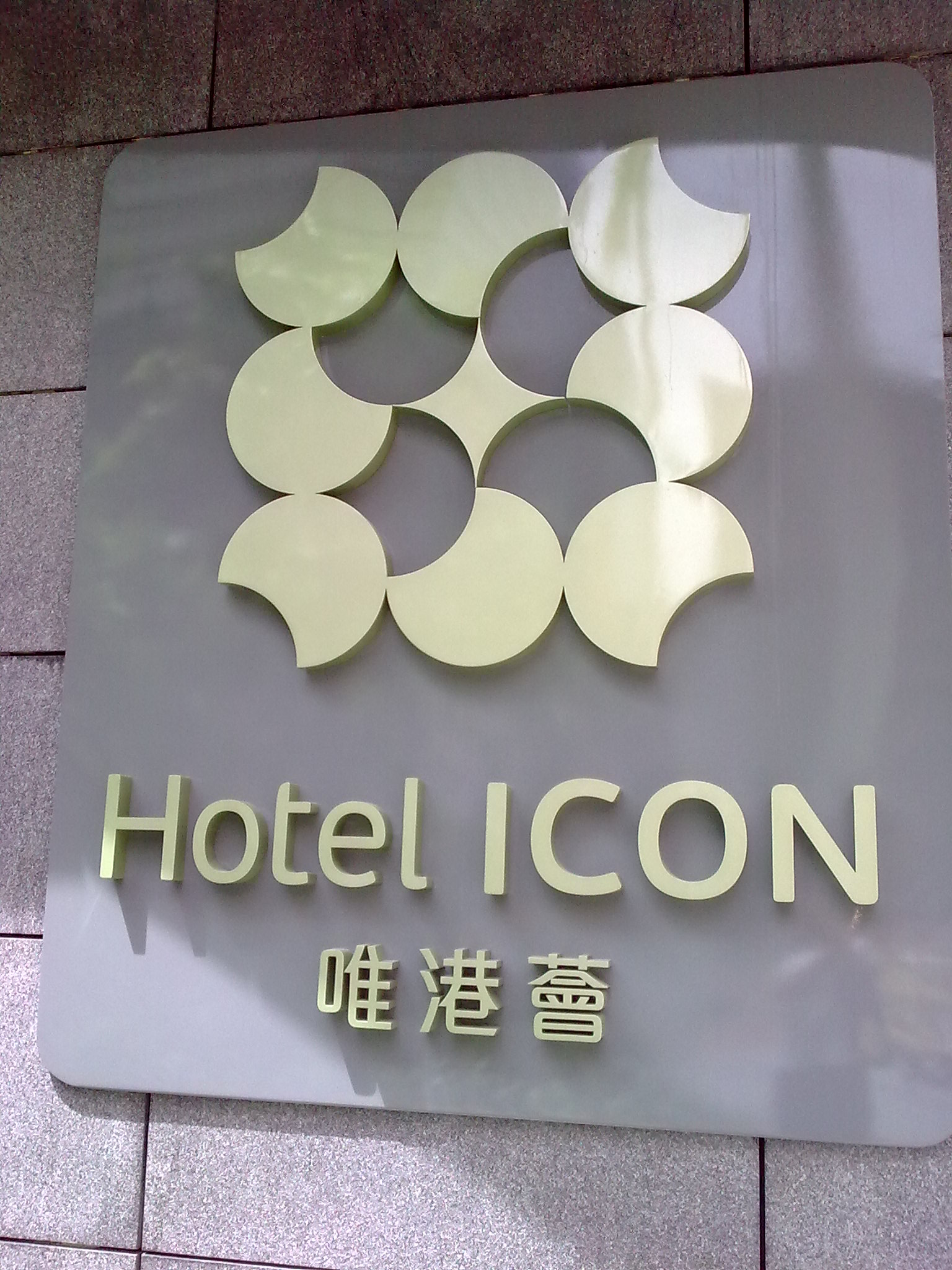
Hotel ICON Logo

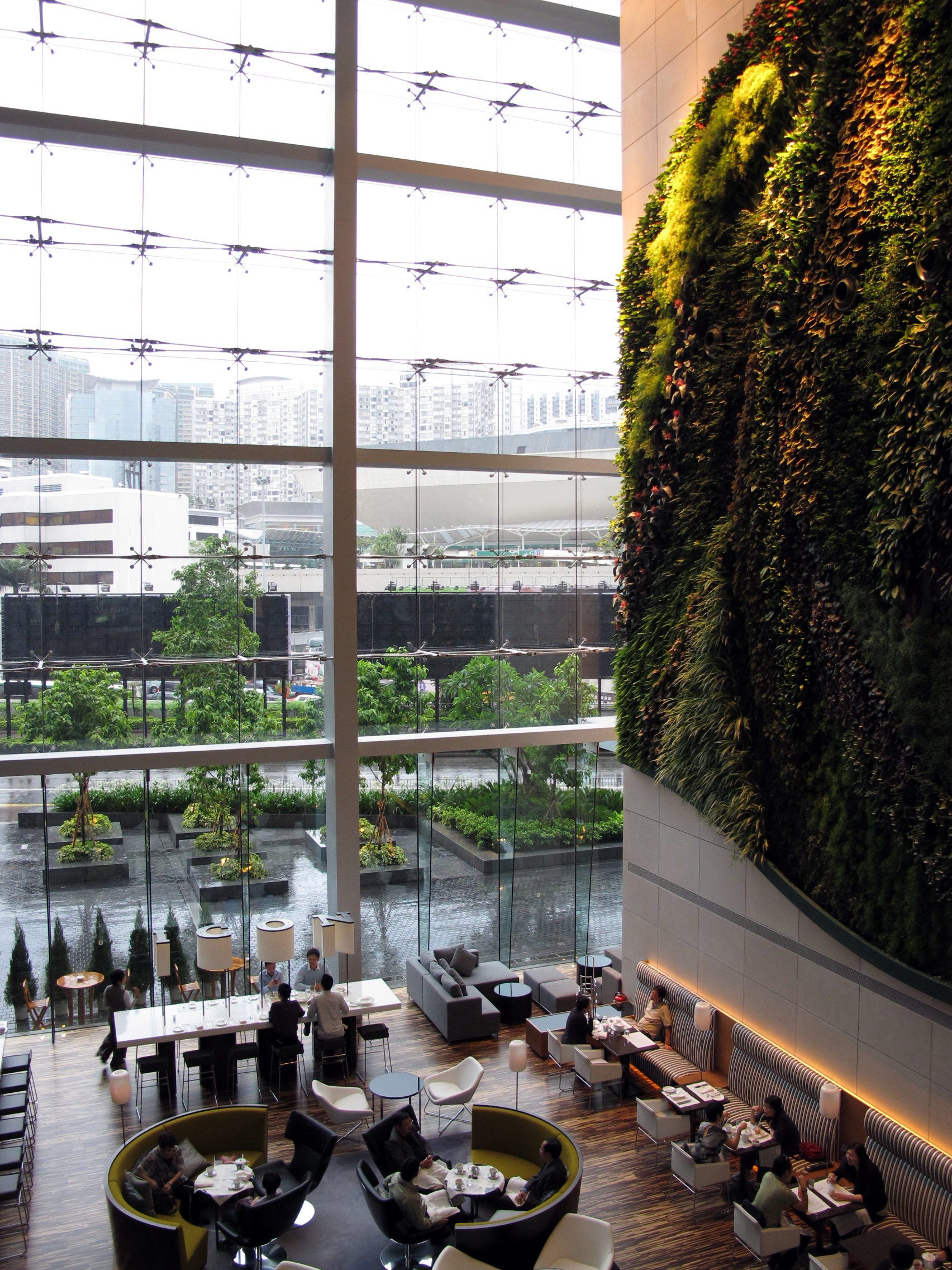
Hotel ICON Lobby

=== Hung Hom Bay and West Kowloon Campus ===
The Hung Hom Bay Campus and West Kowloon Campus are the two satellite campuses which house the College of Professional and Continuing Education which is formed by two subsidiaries: the Hong Kong Community College (HKCC) and School of Professional Education and Executive Development (SPEED).

Established in 2001 under the auspices of PolyU, HKCC is a self-financed post-secondary institution which offers associate degree and higher diploma programmes spanning the domains of arts, science, social sciences, business, health care and design for senior secondary school leavers. HKCC classes are conducted at the Hung Hom Bay and West Kowloon.

== Academics ==
=== Organisation ===
As of 2026, PolyU employed 7,900 full-time staff, 909 of whom are at Assistant Professor and above levels. The university offers over 180 taught programmes for more than 33,950 students every year.

Over 180 programmes, including Bachelor's degrees with honours, and postgraduate programmes, are offered through 7 Faculties, 4 Schools and 1 College, including Faculty of Business, Faculty of Computer and Mathematical Sciences, Faculty of Construction and Environment, Faculty of Engineering, Faculty of Health and Social Sciences, Faculty of Humanities, Faculty of Science, School of Design, School of Fashion and Textiles, School of Hotel and Tourism Management, Graduate School and College of Undergraduate Studies

The Graduate School, established in September 2020, oversees the administration of research postgraduate education of the university, though the academic supervision of students is still managed by the respective faculties, schools or department.

The College of Undergraduate Studies, established in 2025, is to foster academic excellence, innovation, and whole-person development in students through academic programmes, interdisciplinary learning, and the General University Requirements for their success in a rapidly changing world.

The College of Professional and Continuing Education (CPCE), founded in 2002, is a subsidiary of the university. It is formed by Hong Kong Community College (HKCC) and School of Professional Education and Executive Development (SPEED), both of which offer self-financed degree programmes and sub-degrees programmes in the name of the college.

=== Research ===
PolyU's research focus areas include: deep space exploration, smart cities, materials and sensing technology, life sciences and healthcare, AI and robotics and advanced manufacturing. To facilitate the implementation of cross-disciplinary research through collaborations among faculties and schools and other local and overseas institutions and partners. PolyU established more than 80 research laboratories, institutes and centres including 20 research institutes and centres under the PolyU Academy for Interdisciplinary Research, as well as over 10 mainland Translational Research Institutes located in various mainland cities. In addition, there are two State Key Laboratories, two Hong Kong Branches of Chinese National Engineering Research Centres, and four Chinese Academy of Sciences-PolyU Joint Laboratories, along with other university-level research facilities spanning diverse fields.

The Hong Kong Research Institute of Textiles and Apparel established by PolyU in 2006 acts as a focal point to enhance technological innovation in textiles and apparel industry for the development of highly competitive industrial clusters in Hong Kong. In order to promote undergraduate research, PolyU has established Undergraduate Research and Innovation Scheme (URIS), with the aim to nurture next generation of leaders. URIS is a two year project funded by the University and all student admitted under this scheme will be offered financial support and project grants.

== Rankings and reputation ==
University rankings

Global – Overall
- ARWU World: 101–150 (2026)
- QS World: 50 (2027)
- THE World: 79 (2027)
- THE Reputation: 101–150 (2025)
- USNWR Global: 52 (2026)

Regional – Overall
- QS Asia: 9 (2027)
- THE Asia: 18 (2026)
- USNWR Asia: 11 (2026)

=== Overall rankings ===
Globally, PolyU is #50 in the QS World University Rankings 2027, #79 in the Times Higher Education (THE) World University Rankings 2027, #52 in the US News Best Global Universities Rankings 2026–2027, and #101–150 in ARWU 2026.

PolyU was named the 3rd most international university in the world in 2025 by THE. The university was ranked #6 worldwide (#3 in Hong Kong) in the QS "Top 50 Under 50" list of the world's top young universities (2021) and #7 worldwide (#3 in Hong Kong) in the Times Higher Education's Young University Rankings 2024.

=== Subject/area rankings ===
==== QS Subject Rankings ====
In the QS World University Rankings by Subject 2026:

| Subject (only subjects ranked among top 100 are listed) | PolyU's World Rank |
|---|---|
| Hospitality and Leisure Management | 15 |
| Nursing | 18 |
| Civil & Structural Engineering | 18 |
| Architecture & Built Environment | 21 |
| Art & Design | 24 |
| Environmental Sciences | 34 |
| Marketing | 36 |
| Statistics & Operational Research | 40 |
| Linguistics | 45 |
| Accounting & Finance | 51 |
| Business & Management Studies | 52 |
| Mechanical, Aeronautical & Manufacturing Engineering | 53 |
| Social Sciences & Management (Broad Subject Area) | 62 |
| Materials Sciences | 64 |
| Mathematics | 68 |
| Engineering & Technology (Broad Subject Area) | 70 |
| Computer Science & Information Systems | 70 |
| Arts & Humanities (Broad Subject Area) | 72 |
| Electrical & Electronic Engineering | 73 |
| Data Science & Artificial Intelligence | 51–100 |
| Geography | 51–100 |
| Library & Information Management | 51–100 |
| Sports-Related Subjects | 51–100 |
| Mineral & Mining Engineering | 51–100 |

==== Other subject rankings ====
The Faculty of Business is ranked 2nd in shipping research in the world, based on Clarivate on Web of Science from 2022 to 2024. It is ranked 35th in the Top 100 World Rankings of Business Schools by University of Texas at Dallas, based on research contributions to 24 leading business journals from 2020 to 2024.

The School of Design was listed as one of the Top 10 Best Industrial Design Schools in the World in 2015 and one of the Special Mentioned Graphic Design Schools in the World by Design Schools Hub in 2016. In 2013, PolyU Design became the only School from Asia on Business Insider's World's Best 25 Design School list. PolyU ranks 1st in the CoinDesk's Best University for Blockchain.

The School of Hotel and Tourism Management (SHTM) is ranked No. 1 in the world in the "Hospitality and Tourism Management" category in ShanghaiRanking's Global Ranking of Academic Subjects 2025 for the ninth consecutive year; placed No. 1 globally in the "Commerce, Management, Tourism and Services" category in the University Ranking by Academic Performance in 2024/2025 for eight years in a row; rated No. 1 in the world in the "Hospitality, Leisure, Sport & Tourism" subject area by the CWUR Rankings by Subject 2017 and ranked No. 1 in the Asia in the "Hospitality and Leisure Management" subject area in the QS World University Rankings by Subject 2025.

=== Research recognition ===
A total of 428 PolyU scholars have been recognised in the list of the World's Top 2% Most-cited Scientists 2025, based on career-long and single-year citation impact, compiled by Stanford University. This places PolyU second among Hong Kong's universities in terms of the number of scholars listed, underscoring the international recognition of the university's research excellence. In addition, 4 PolyU scholars rank among the global top 10 in their respective fields, namely Building and Construction; Operations Research; Geological and Geomatics Engineering; and Civil Engineering, while 19 scholars are ranked within the global top 50. This makes PolyU the leading local university in this respect, with the highest number of global top 10 and top 50 scholars. Furthermore, PolyU is the only institution in Hong Kong with scholars listed in the subfields of Criminology; Strategic, Defence and Security Studies; and Social Work, based on career-long citation impact.

== Governance ==
The governing body of the PolyU is the Council, established in accordance with the PolyU Ordinance. The President and the Deputy President are ex officio members. There are also 17 external members from the business and professional sectors, three elected staff members, one alumni member and two elected student members. The highest advisory body of the Council is the University Court, which is responsible for providing opinions on the direction of the university to promote the development of the university.

=== Presidents ===
List of presidents of PolyU and their predecessors (known as the director of the Hong Kong Polytechnic before 1994):

- Keith Legg (1972–1985)
- John Clark (1985–1991)
- Poon Chung-kwong (25 November 1991 – 31 December 2008)
- Timothy W. Tong (1 January 2009 – 31 December 2018)
- Philip C. H. Chan (1 January 2019 – 30 June 2019)
- Teng Jin-guang (1 July 2019 – present)

== Collaboration ==
PolyU has established cooperative relations with more than 360 universities or institutions in over 40 countries and regions around the world, and signed more than 600 agreements in the areas of student exchange arrangements to joint research cooperation.

== Student life ==
=== Sports teams ===
- Athletics
- Badminton
- Basketball
- Cross Country
- Dragon Boat
- Fencing
- Handball
- Karate-do
- Rugby
- Soccer
- Squash
- Swimming
- Table Tennis
- Taekwondo
- Tennis
- Volleyball
- Water Polo
- Woodball

=== Student Halls of Residence ===
There are two student halls of residence buildings provided by the university, Hung Hom Halls of Residence and Homantin Halls of Residence. The residential halls include:

- Hung Hom Halls of Residence – located at 1 Hung Lai Road, Hung Hom Bay, adjacent to Royal Peninsula, Harbour Place, and Harbourview Horizon. Covering over 5,800 square meters, the complex comprises a 22-story tower block completed in 2002. It was designed by Hsin Yieh Architects & Associates Ltd. Comprising nine individual halls, Hung Hom Halls accommodate over 3000 students in total. Boyan Hall is for research postgraduate students only. The remaining eight halls are for undergraduate students, with Xuemin Hall designated for female residents only. Because of its location and student culture, Hung Hom Hall (generally abbreviated as HH Hall) is considered better than the other choices for students.
- Homantin Halls of Residence – Located at 15 Fat Kwong Street, Homantin Halls was completed in 2012. The complex includes shared facilities on the lower four floors (LG/F – 2/F), student accommodation from the 3rd to 23rd floors, providing a total of 1,650 residential places, and staff quarters on the 24th and 25th floors. Homantin Halls comprises six halls: Red, Orange, Yellow, Green, Blue, and Violet. In 2021, Green Hall was renamed the "CURI Residential College," which encourages scientific research and innovation. Students under PolyU's Undergraduate Research and Innovation Scheme (URIS) receive priority for accommodation here.

=== New Student Halls of Residence under construction ===
As of 2023, PolyU is constructing two new student halls of residence, expected to be completed and operational by 2028. One is located at Chung Hau Street in Ho Man Tin. As part of the Ho Man Tin campus expansion project, it will provide over 1,200 residential places. The other one is situated on land near Tat Hong Road in Kowloon Tong. Upon completion, it will provide over 1,600 residential places along with other supporting facilities.

=== Off-Campus Housing ===
Managed by the university and located in central urban areas, the Off-Campus Housing provides over 90 residential places for non-local students who are unable to secure on-campus accommodation and face housing difficulties..

Student Halls, PolyU

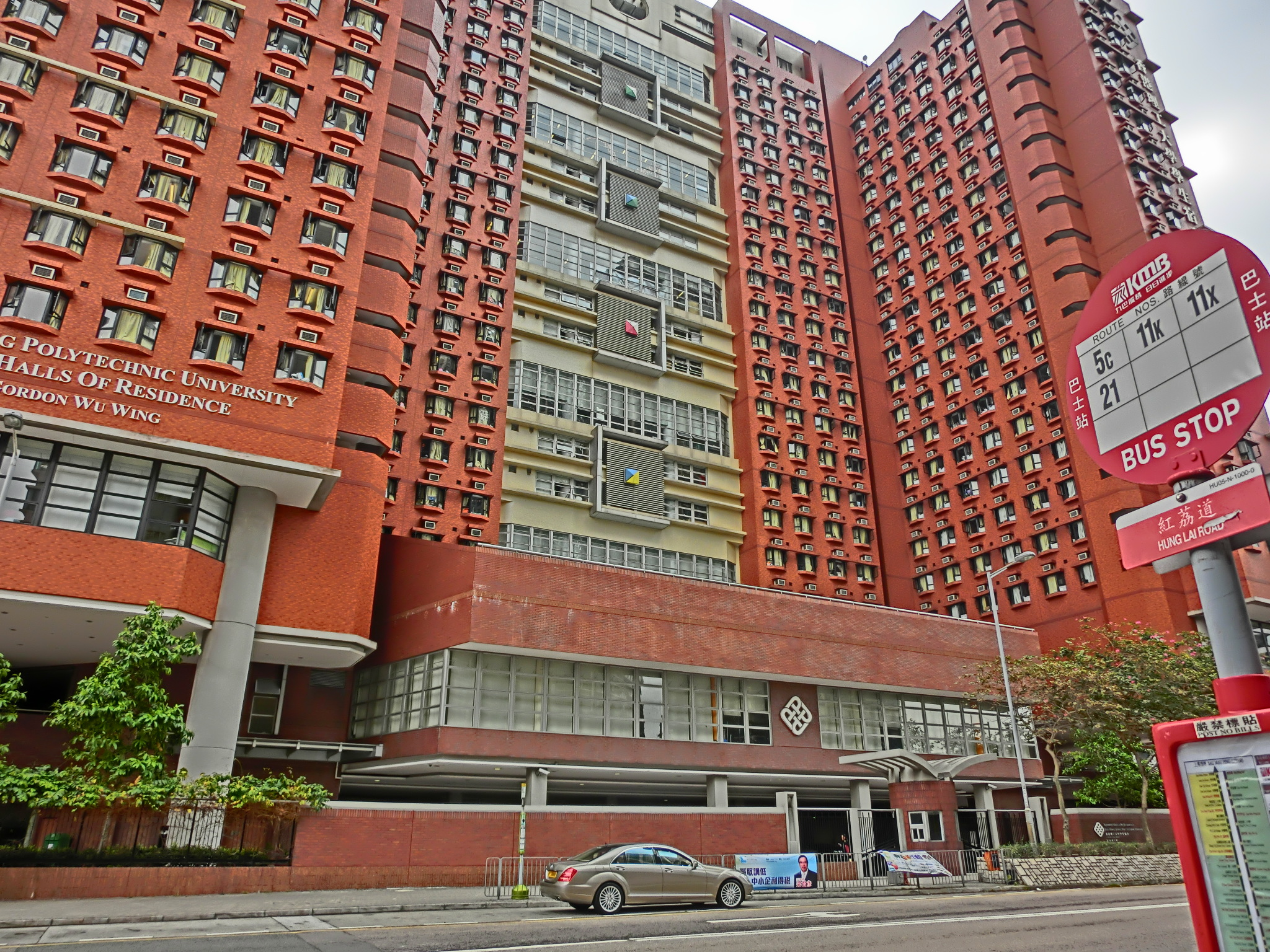
Hung Hom Halls, 2013

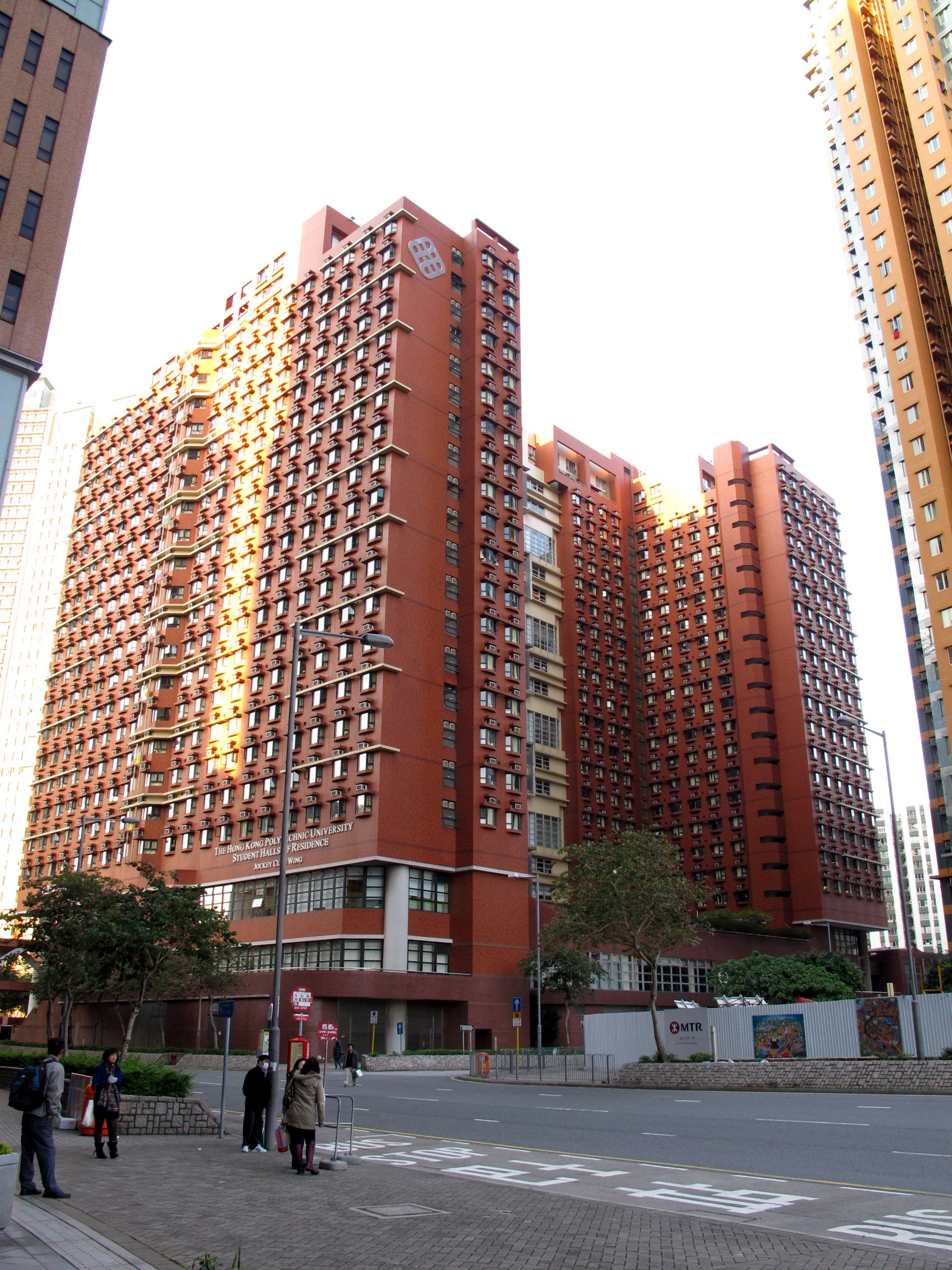
Hung Hom Halls, 2012

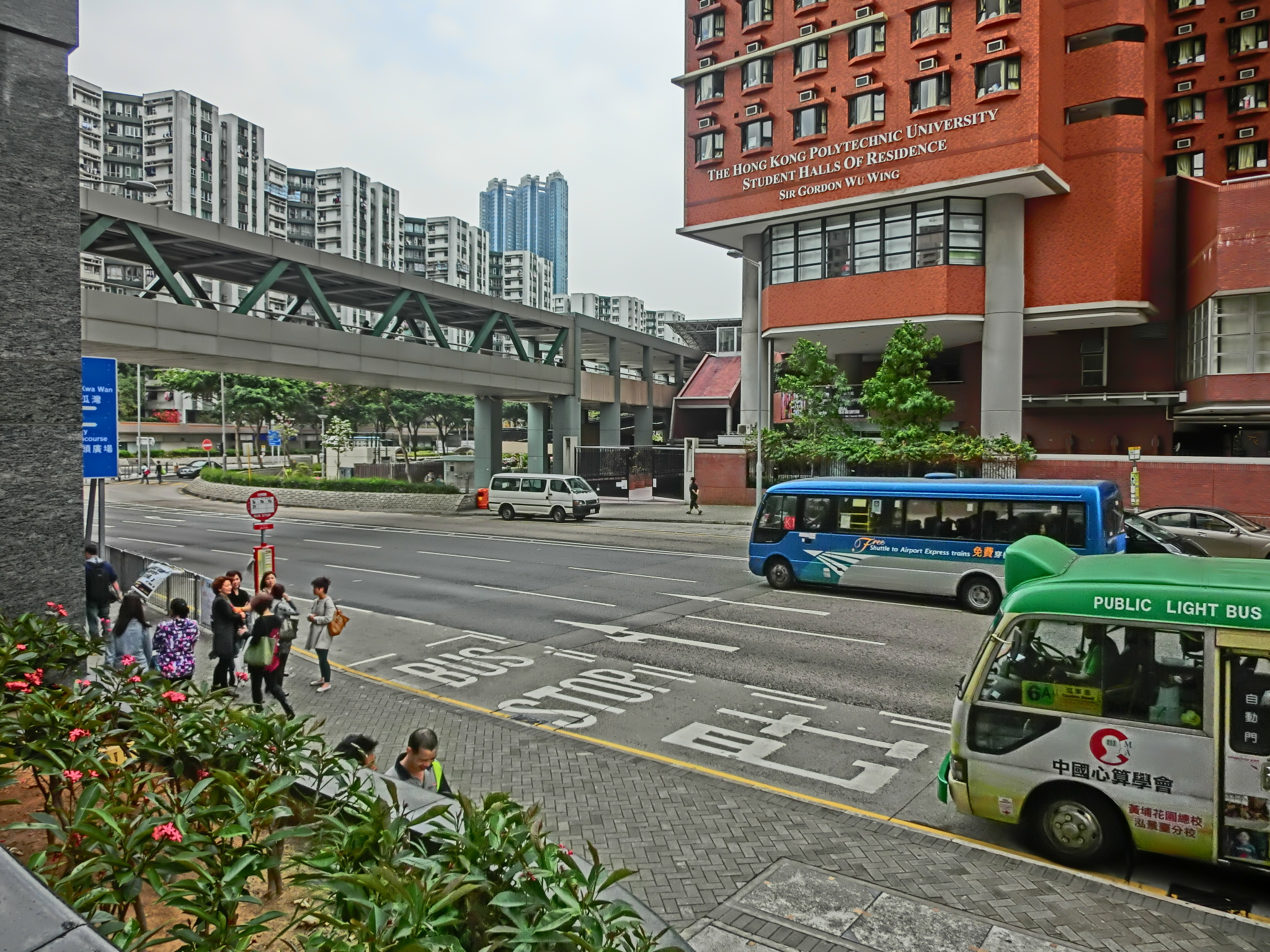
Hung Hom Halls, 2013

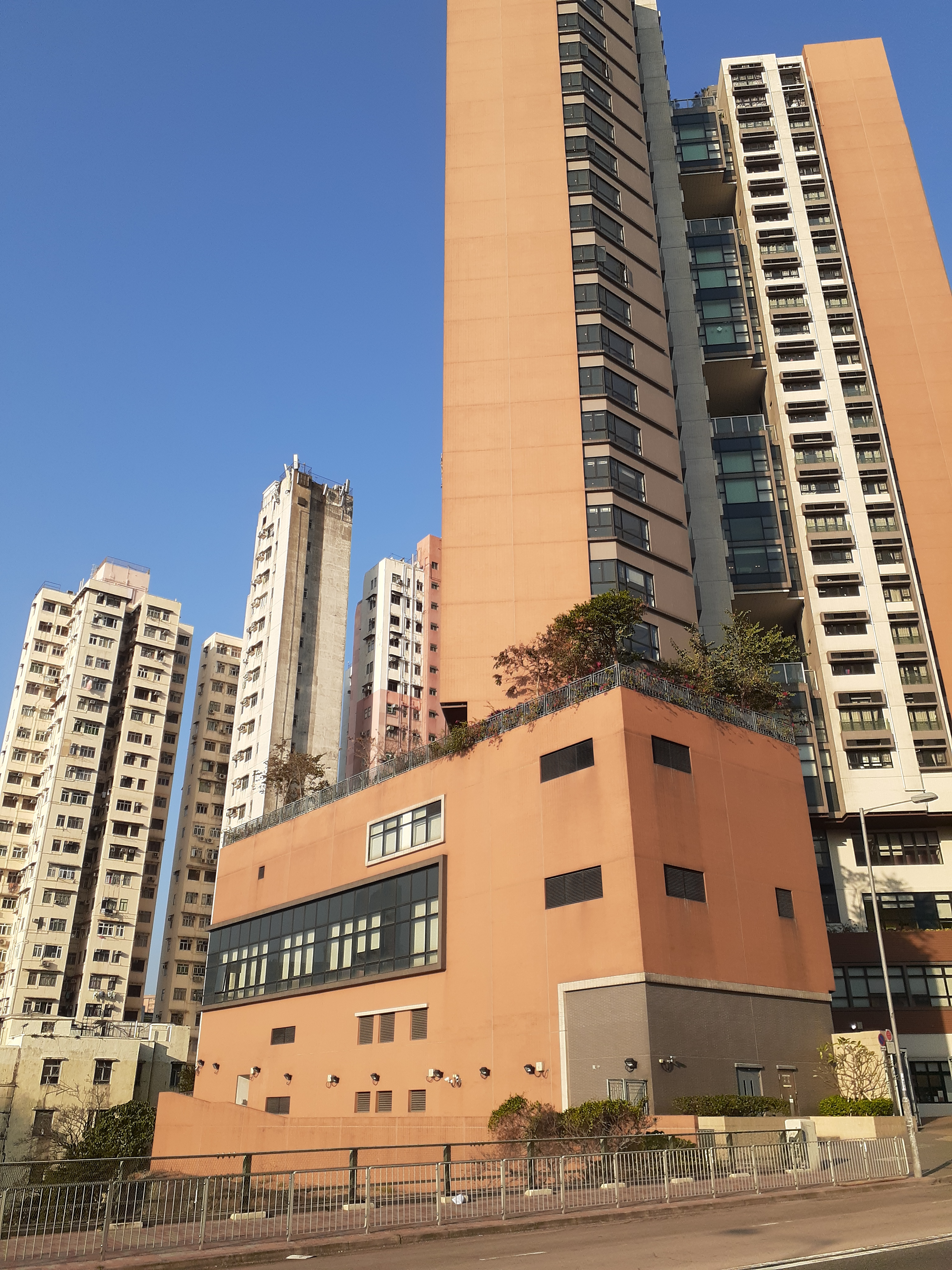
Homantin Halls, 2021

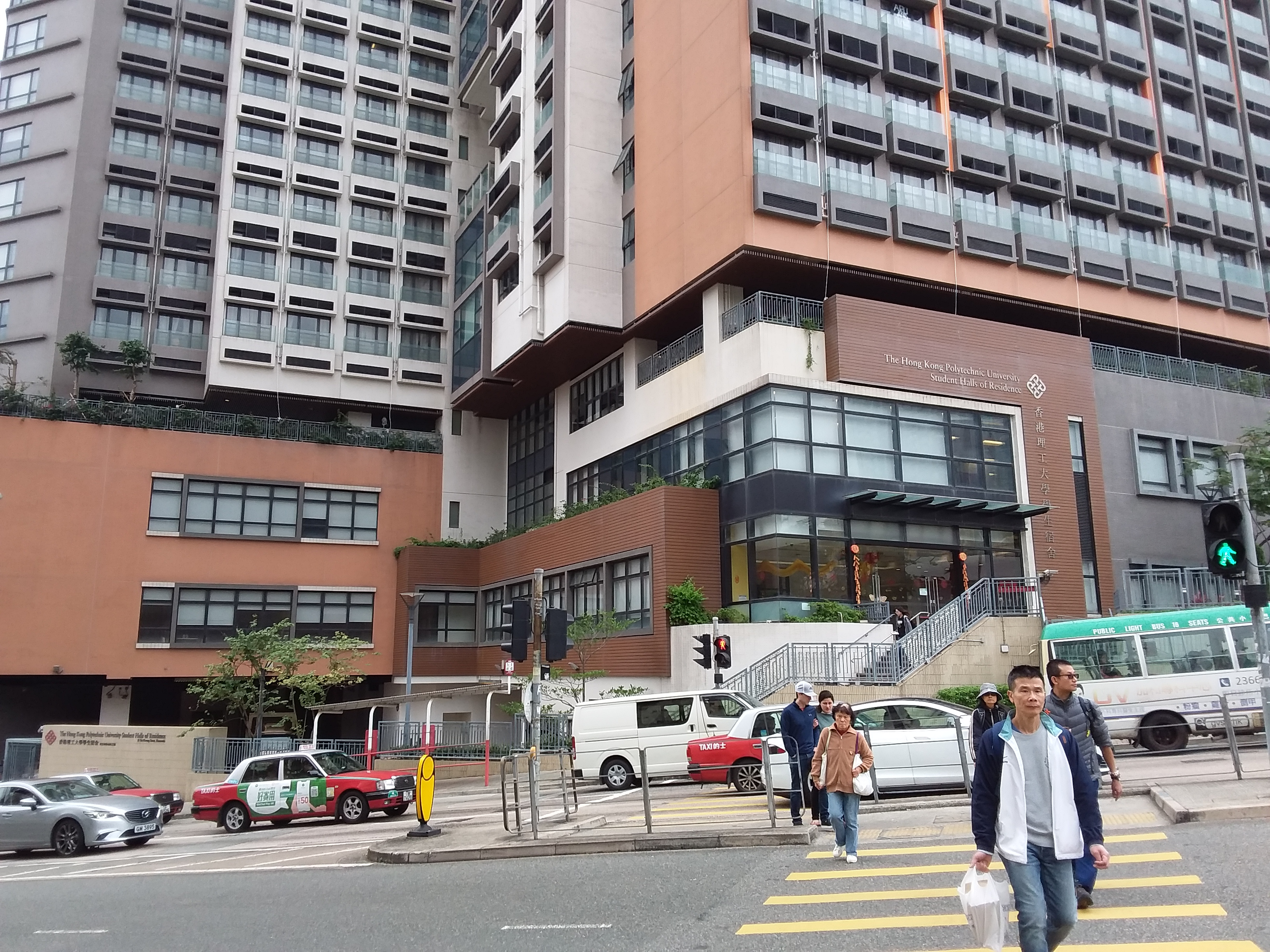
Homantin Halls, 2019

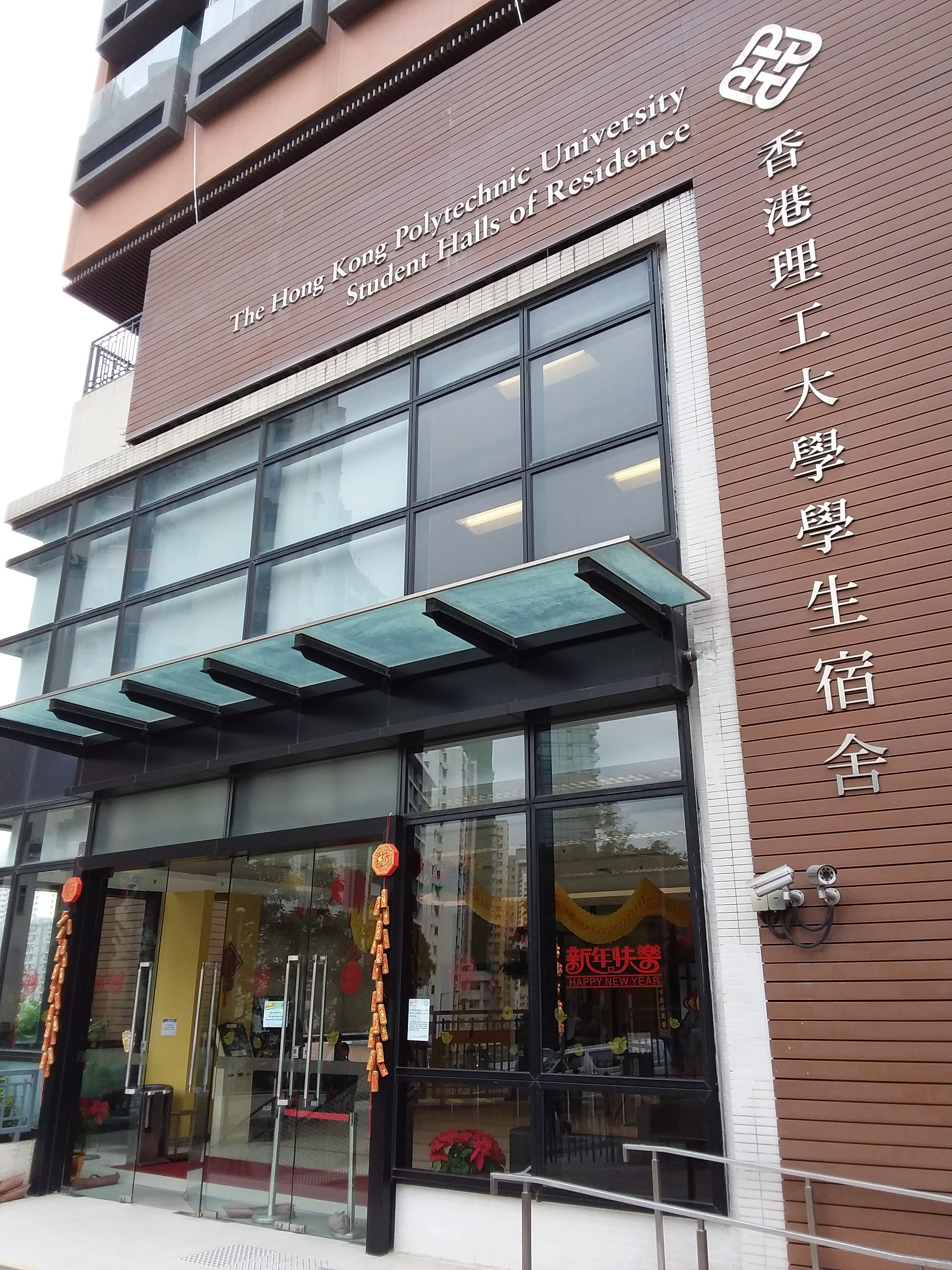
Homantin Halls entrance, 2019

== Incidents ==
=== Democracy wall controversy ===
The university's faculty-led Student Discipline Committee, with the support of the university council chairman Lam Tai-fai, expelled one student and suspended another for one year in response to an October 2018 incident arising from a dispute over postings by students on the "Democracy Wall" bulletin board then managed by the students' union. The students had posted messages in commemoration of the fourth anniversary of the "Umbrella Movement" democracy occupation protests of 2014 and calling for Hong Kong independence from the People's Republic of China. Another two students were ordered to serve terms of community service. The students had been ordered by management to take them down.

The evidence called at the disciplinary committee hearing, at which the students were denied legal representation, included video footage in which the students were observed shouting and knocking on doors. It was alleged that they had made defamatory comments, assaulted a staff member and damaged property, all of which accusations were denied by the students. The university described their behaviour as "unruly". Among them were a former student union leader, an elected member of the school's governing council and a former external vice-president of the student union. No avenue for appeal from a decision of the committee is available.

Numerous pro-democracy groups, including more than a dozen legislators and 19 student organisations, protested the decision of the committee. The 90,000-strong Hong Kong Professional Teachers' Union described the punishments as excessive.

=== Campus siege incident ===
In November 2019, the university was occupied by protesters as part of the 2019–20 Hong Kong protests; confrontation with the Hong Kong Police Force occurred from 17 November to 19 November. On 16 November, police attempted to enter the campus, but failed as protestors barricaded the entrance and used petrol bombs to attack them. The police then blocked all exits of the university campus and requested all protesters inside to surrender. On 18 November, the police attempted to enter the campus again using tear gas, rubber bullets, bean bags, and sponge grenades. Protestors responded by throwing petrol bombs at police. The university has been described as being a battleground during the conflict. The university was later sealed off by police, only several protesters managed to escape. This resulted in a 3-days long standoff. More than 280 protesters were injured while more than 1,000 persons were arrested.

== Notable alumni ==
Notable alumni of PolyU include Chinese Premier Li Qiang, former Chief Executive of Hong Kong Leung Chun-ying, former Hong Kong Legislator Lam Tai-fai and Chan Kam-lam, explorer Rebecca Lee, film director Wong Kar-wai and Raman Hui, musician Paul Wong, singer Gigi Leung, fashion designer Vivienne Tam and software engineer Lui Kim-man.

Notable alumni of PolyU

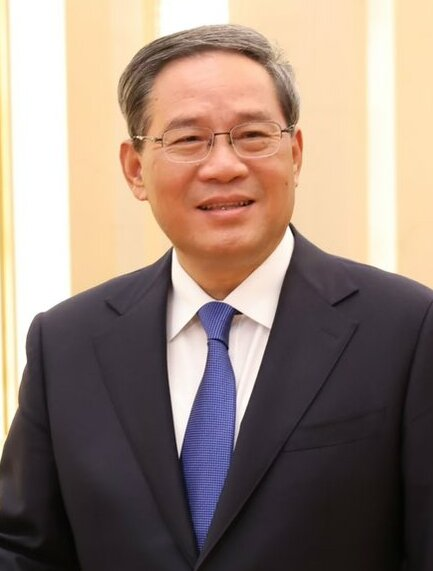
Li Qiang, Premier of the State Council of China

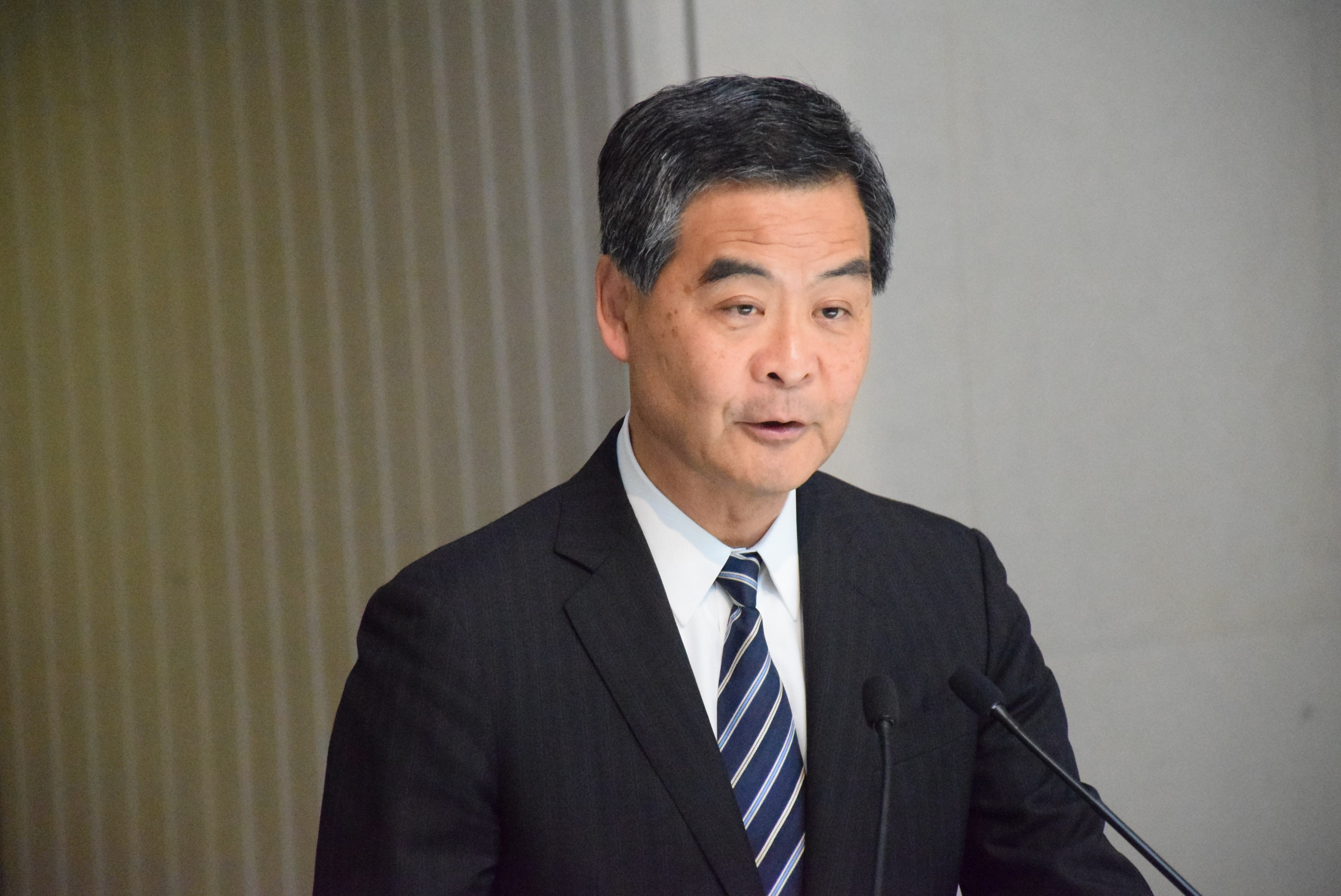
CY Leung, former Chief Executive of Hong Kong SAR

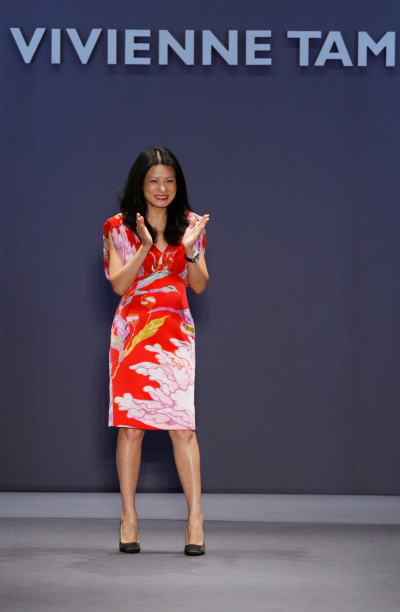
Vivienne Tam, fashion designer

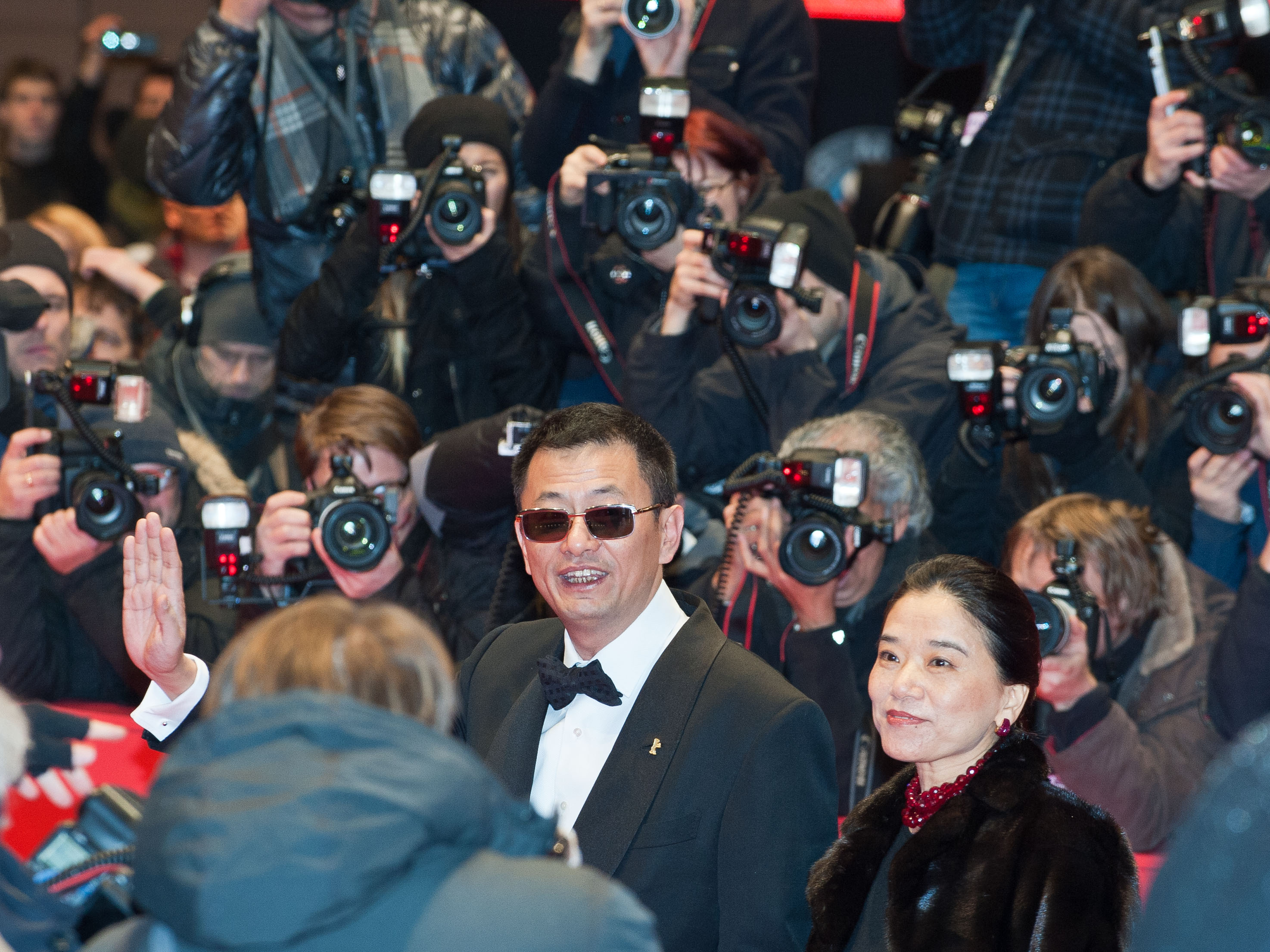
Wong Kar Wai, film director

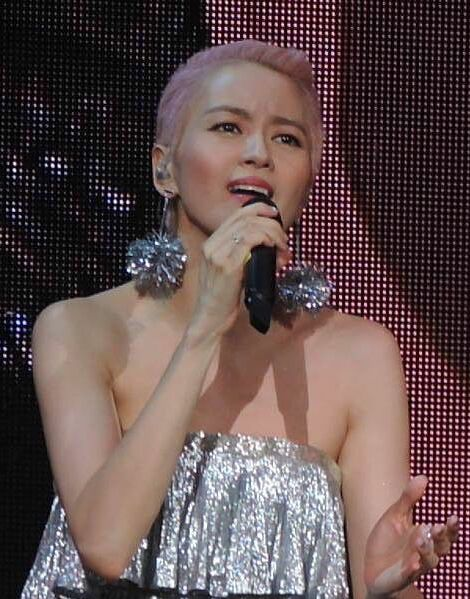
Gigi Leung, singer and actress

== Gallery ==
Architecture of PolyU

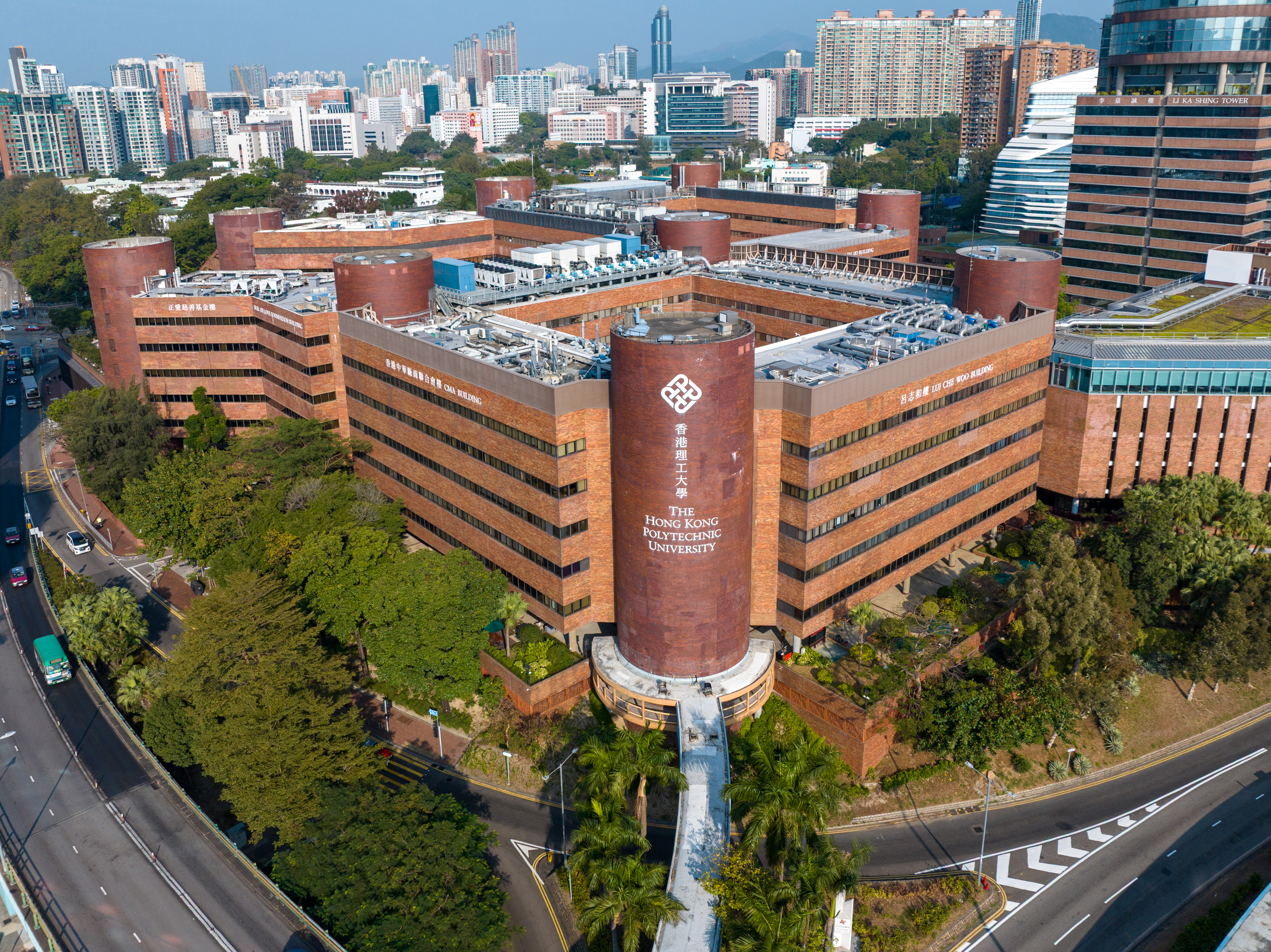
PolyU Main Campus aerial view, 2024

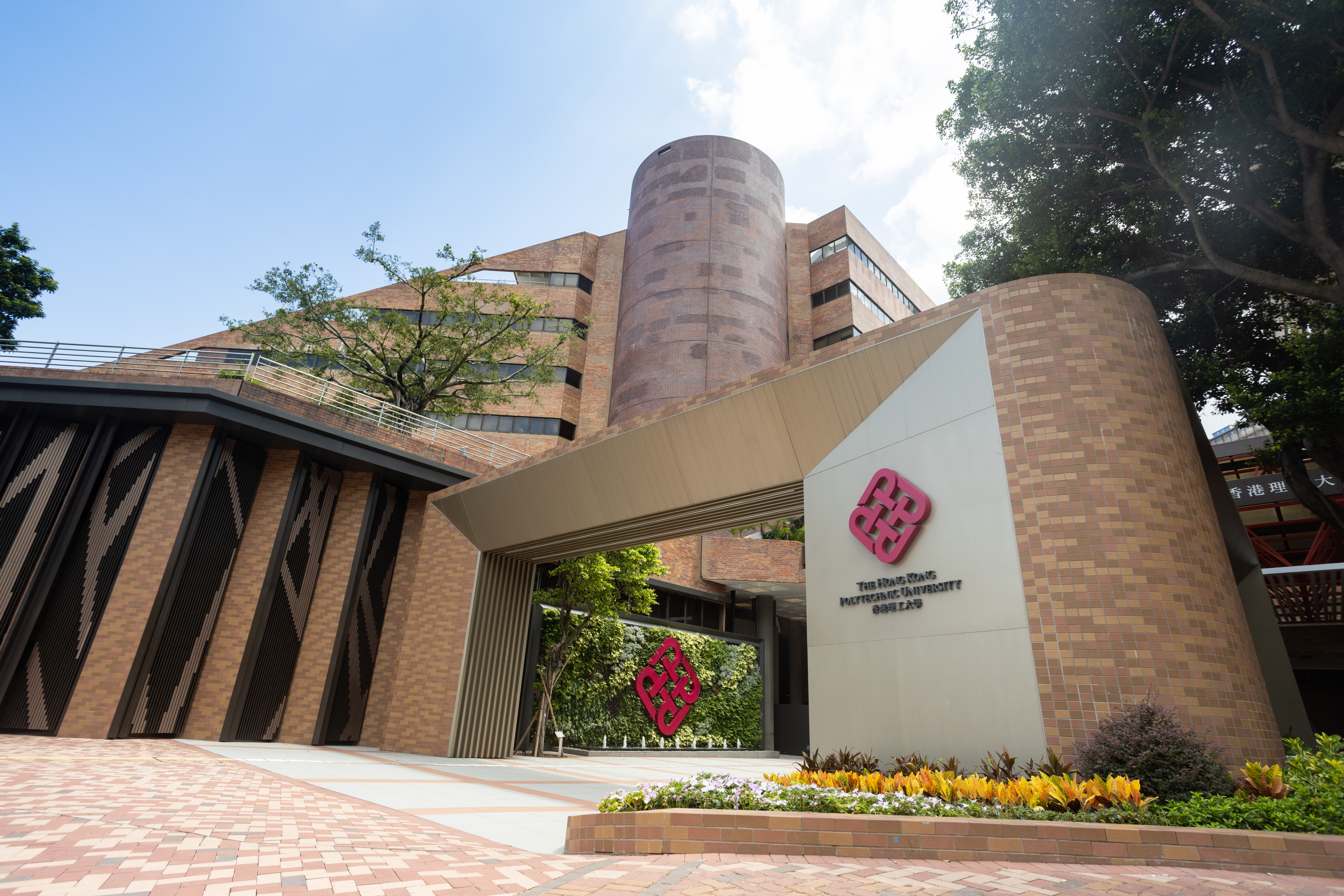
Main Entrance, 2023

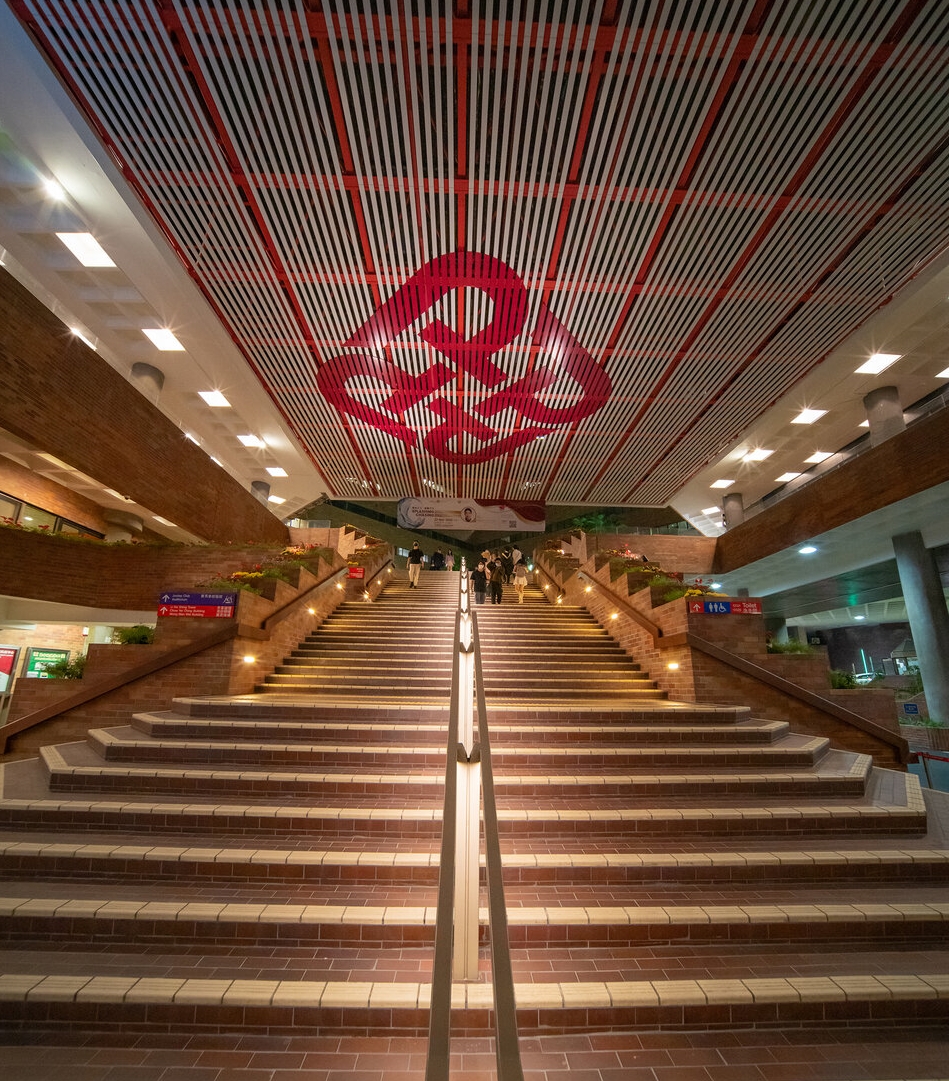
Main Entrance at Core A, 2022

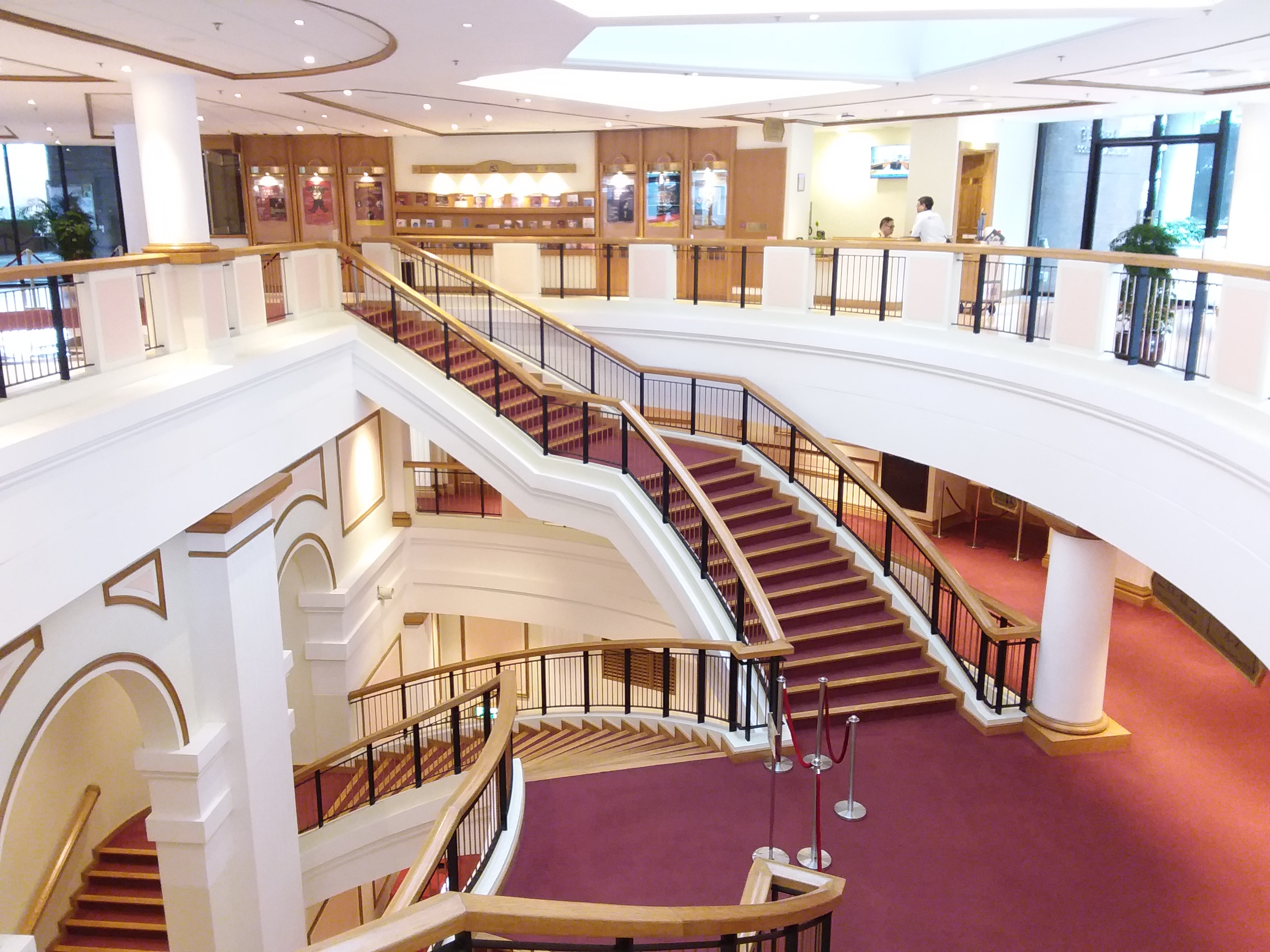
Jockey Club Auditorium, 2019

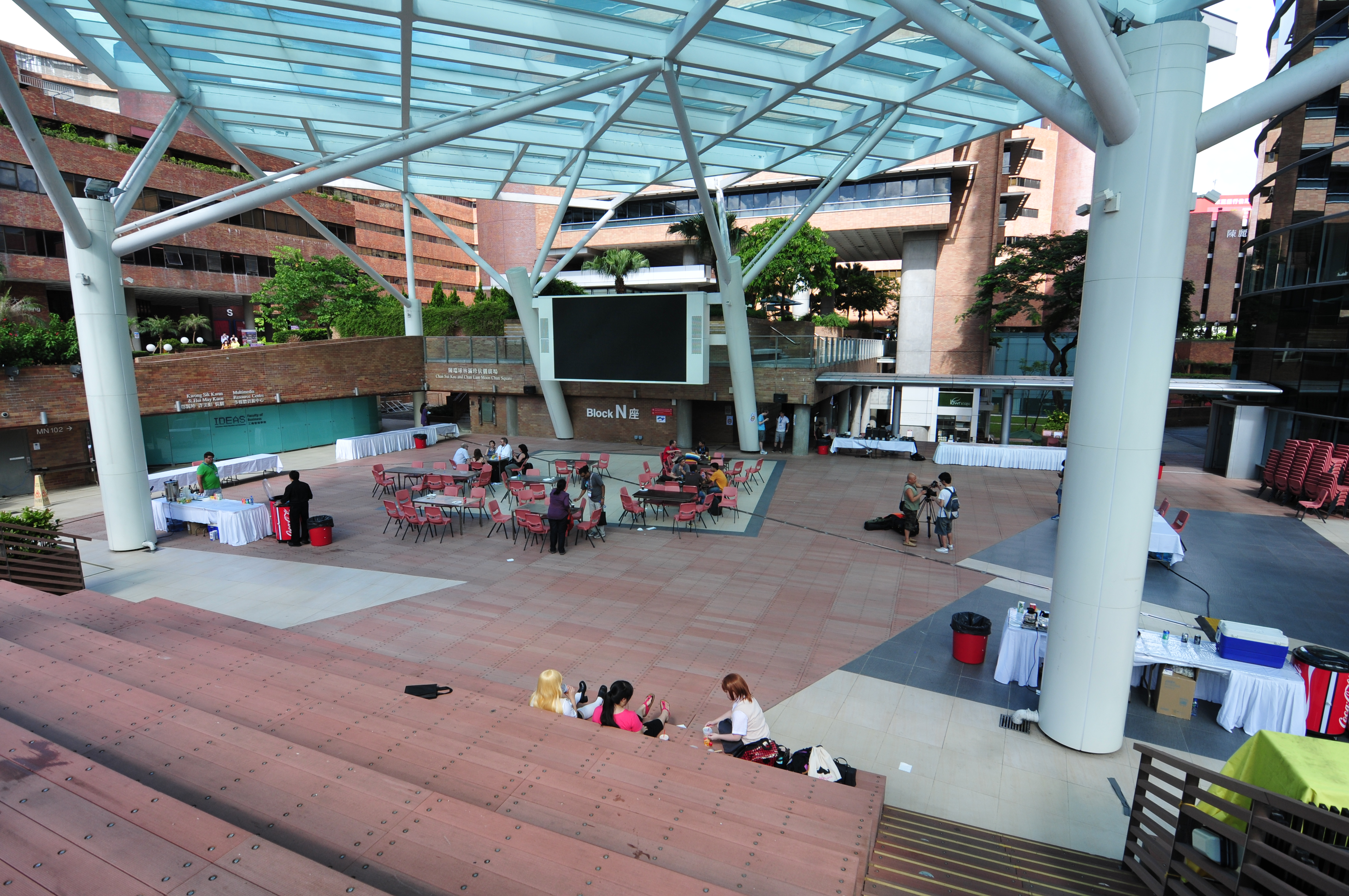
Block N and Logo Square, 2013

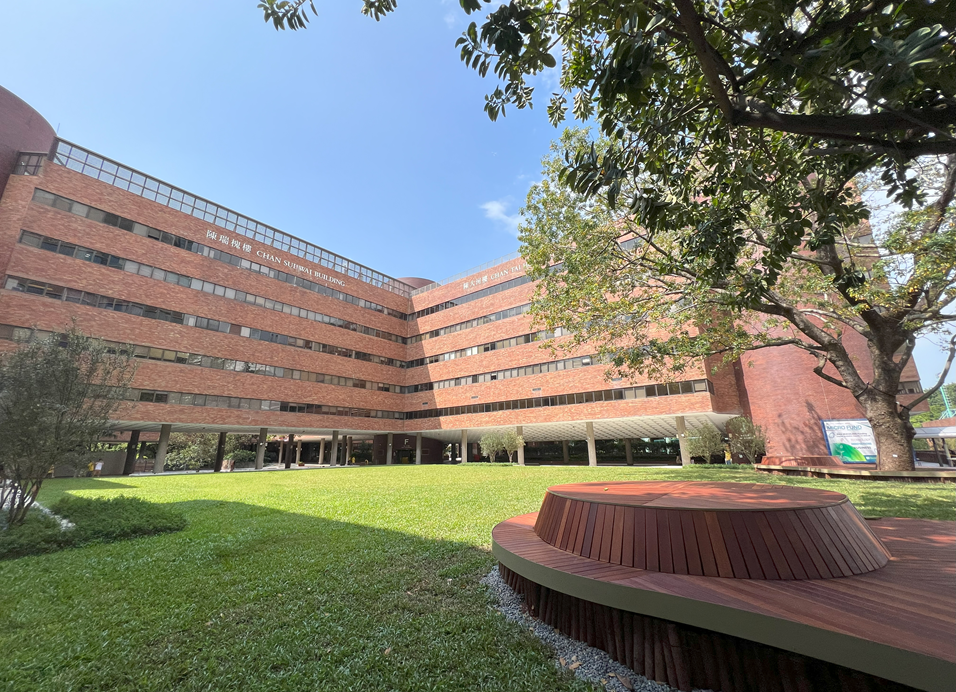
U Square, 2023

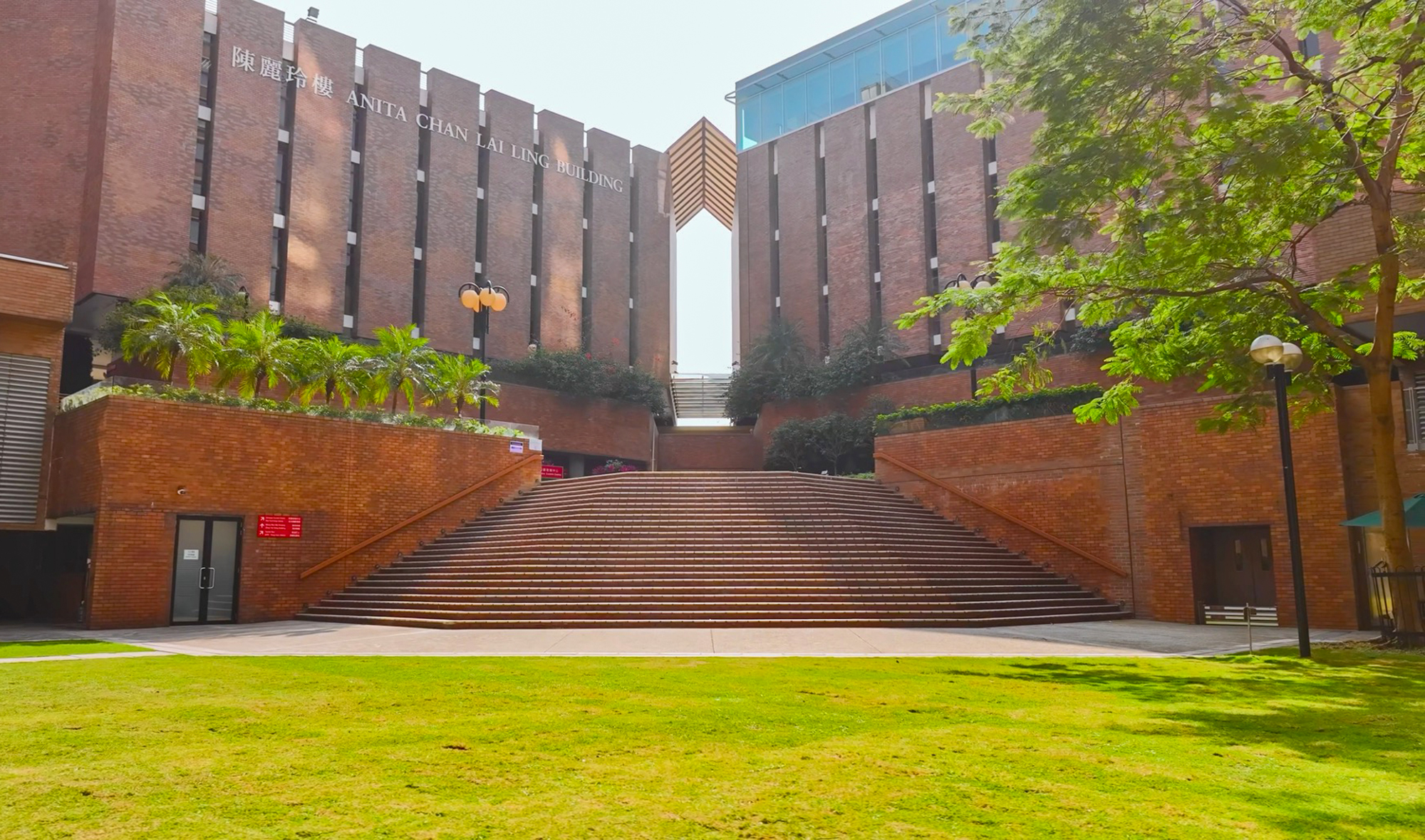
Anita Chan Lai Ling Building, 2024

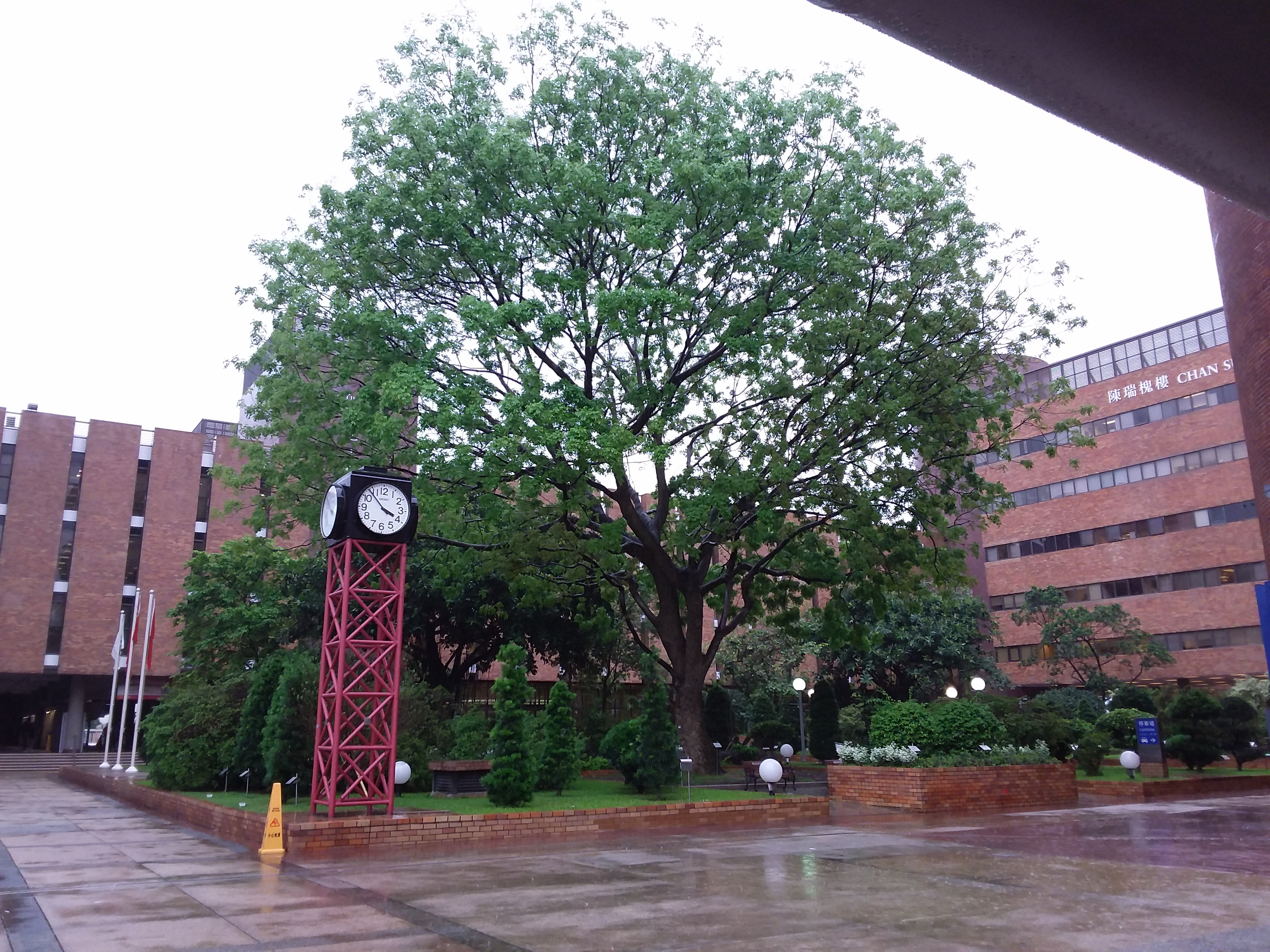
The bell tower is one of the gathering places for students, 2019.

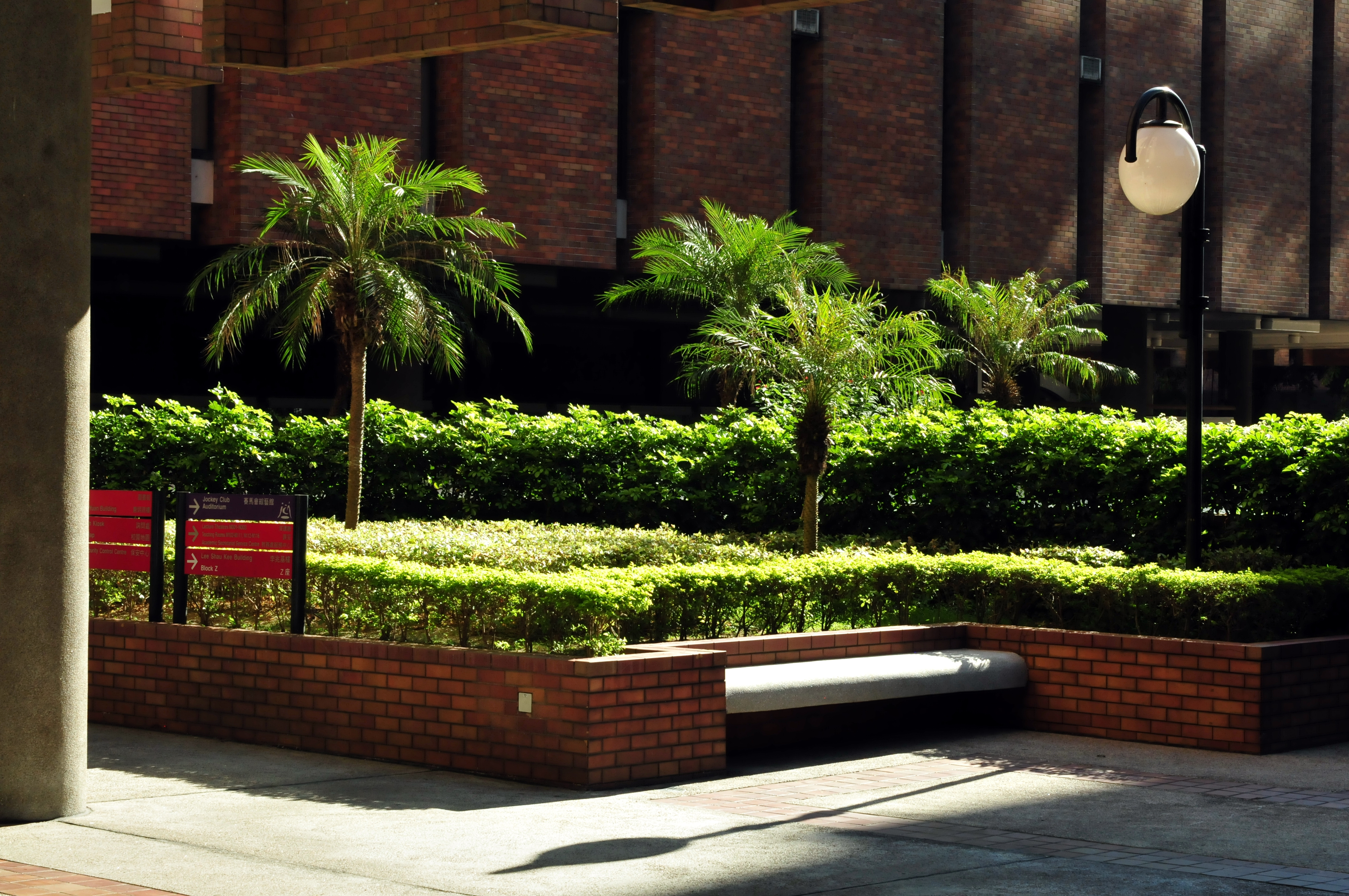
A sitting-out area on campus, 2013

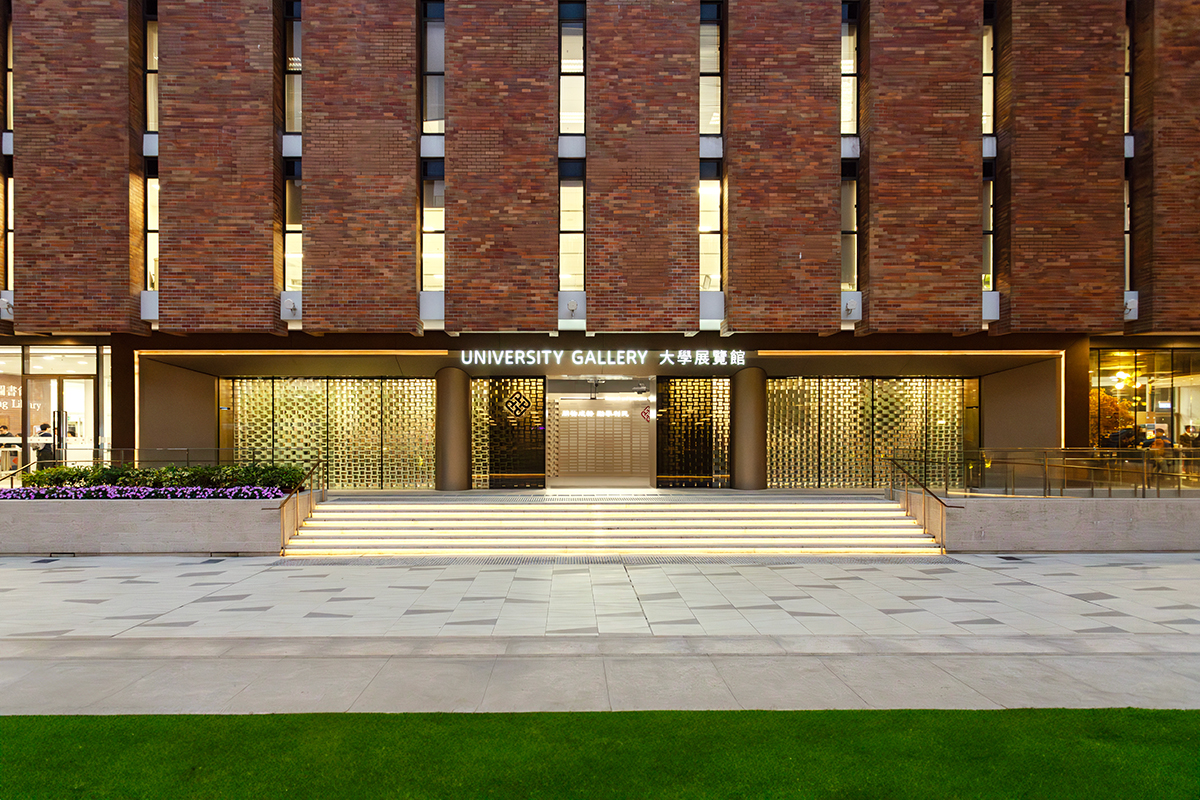
U Gallery, 2025

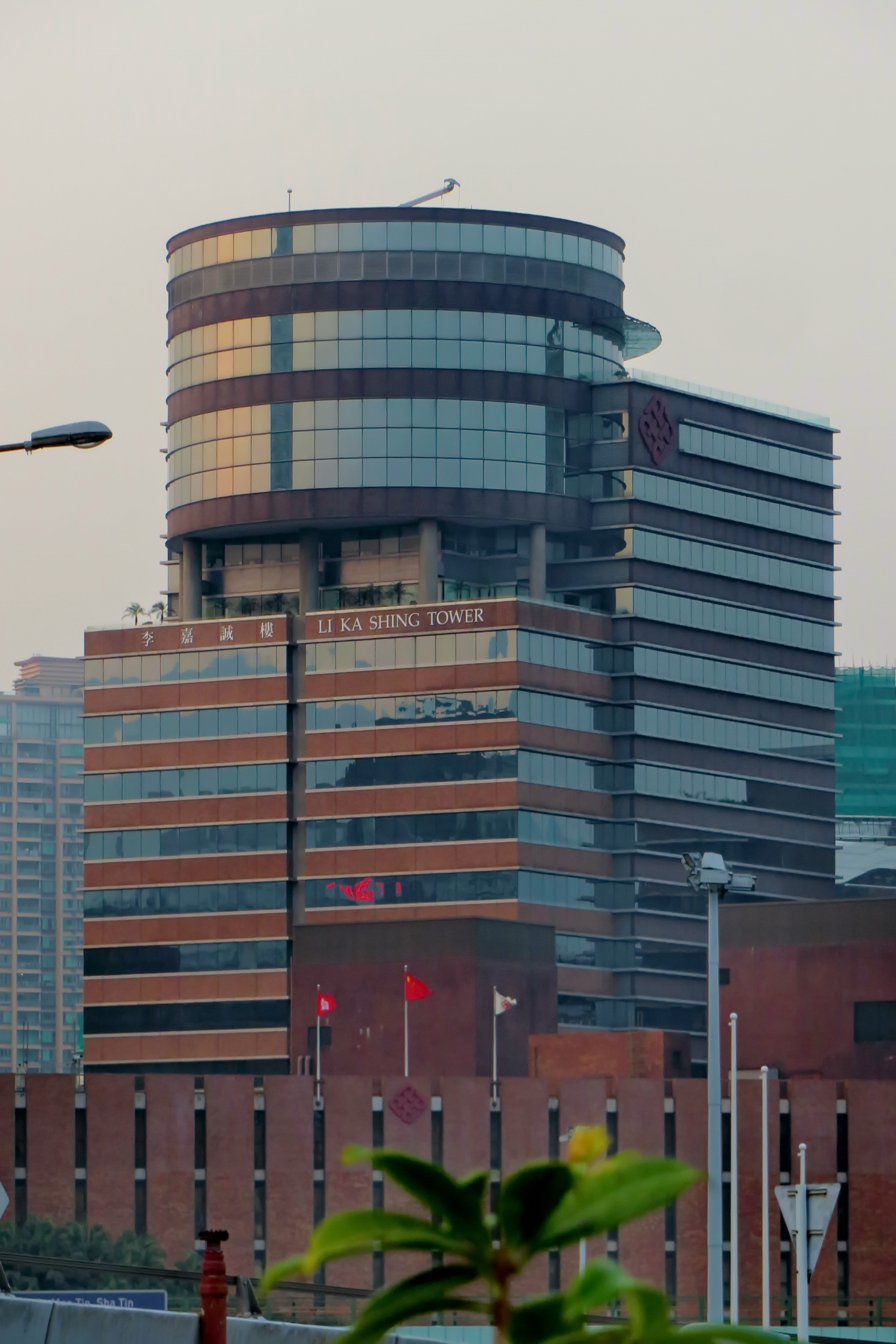
Li Ka Shing Tower, 2013

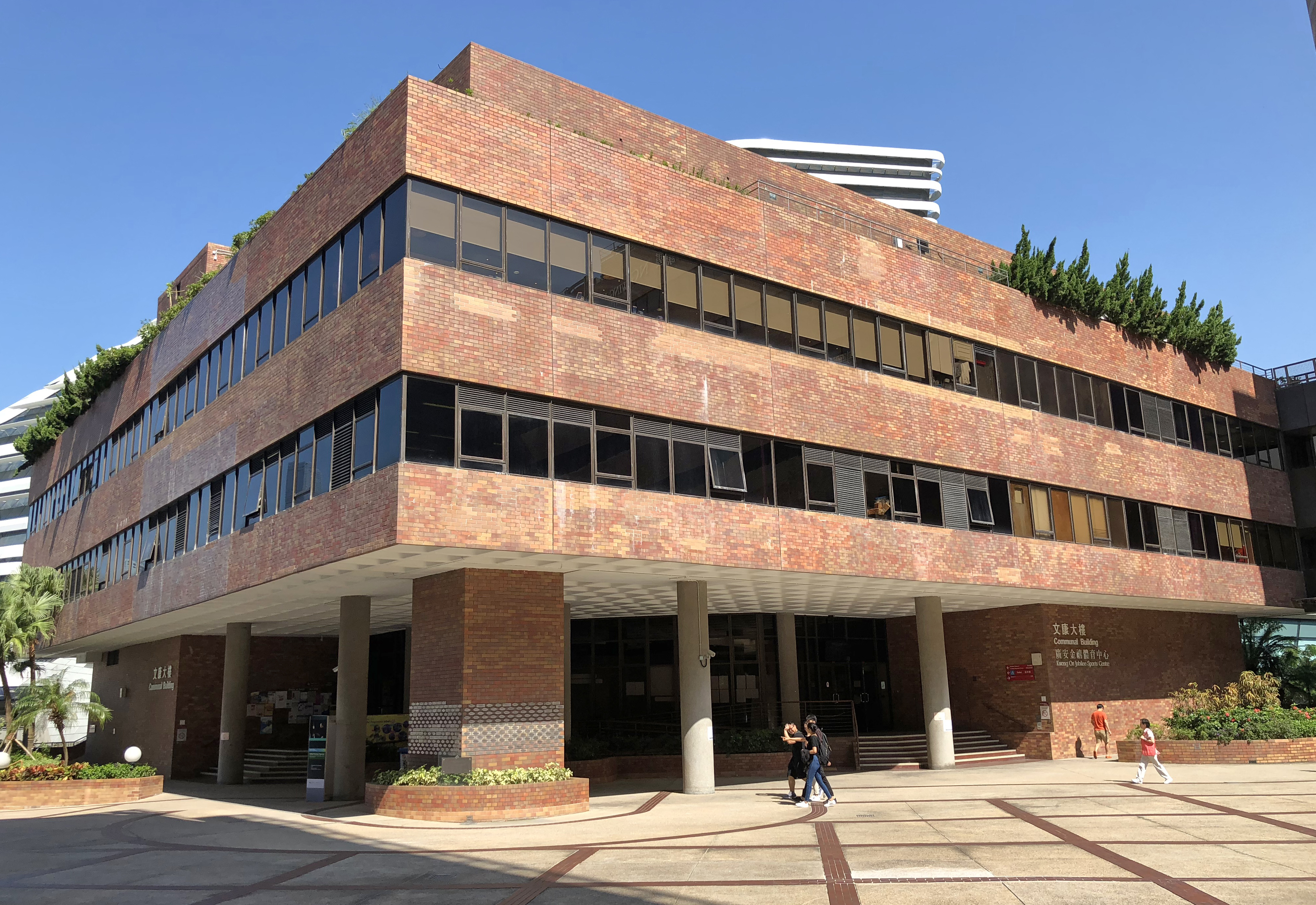
Communal Building, 2018

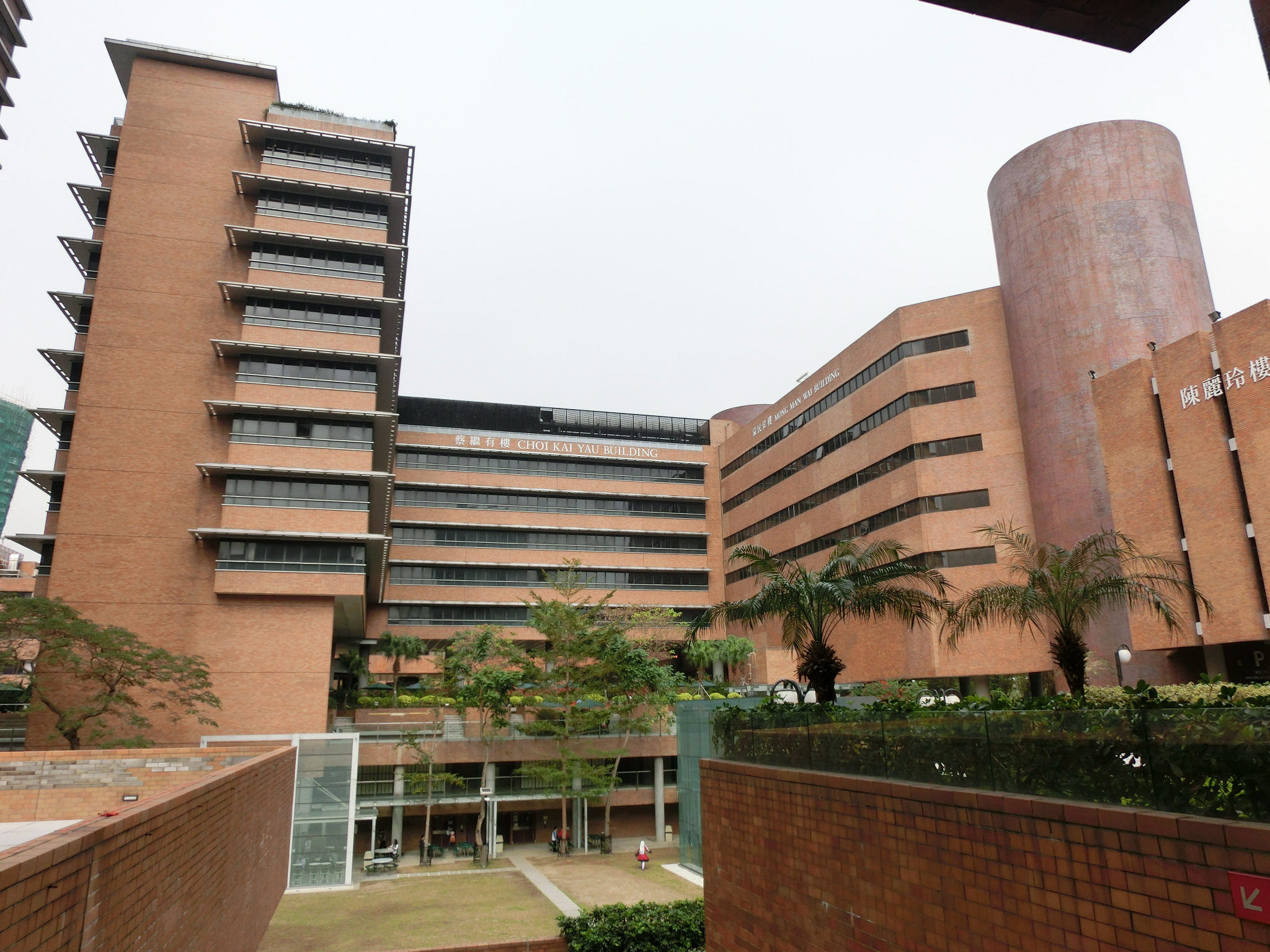
Shirley Chan Building, Choi Kai Yau Building and Mong Mn Wai Building, 2013

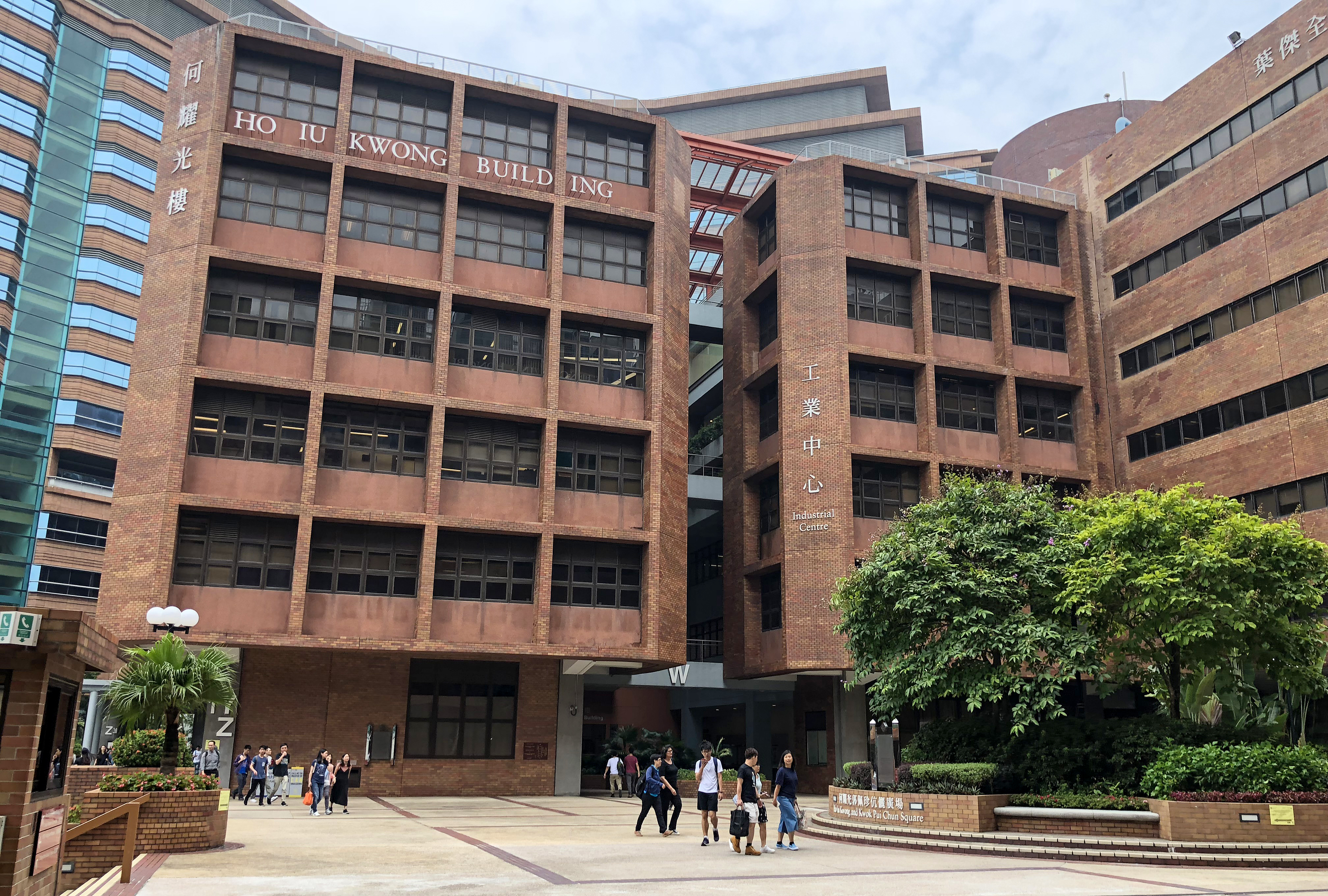
Ho Iu Kwong Building/Industrial Centre (Block W), 2018

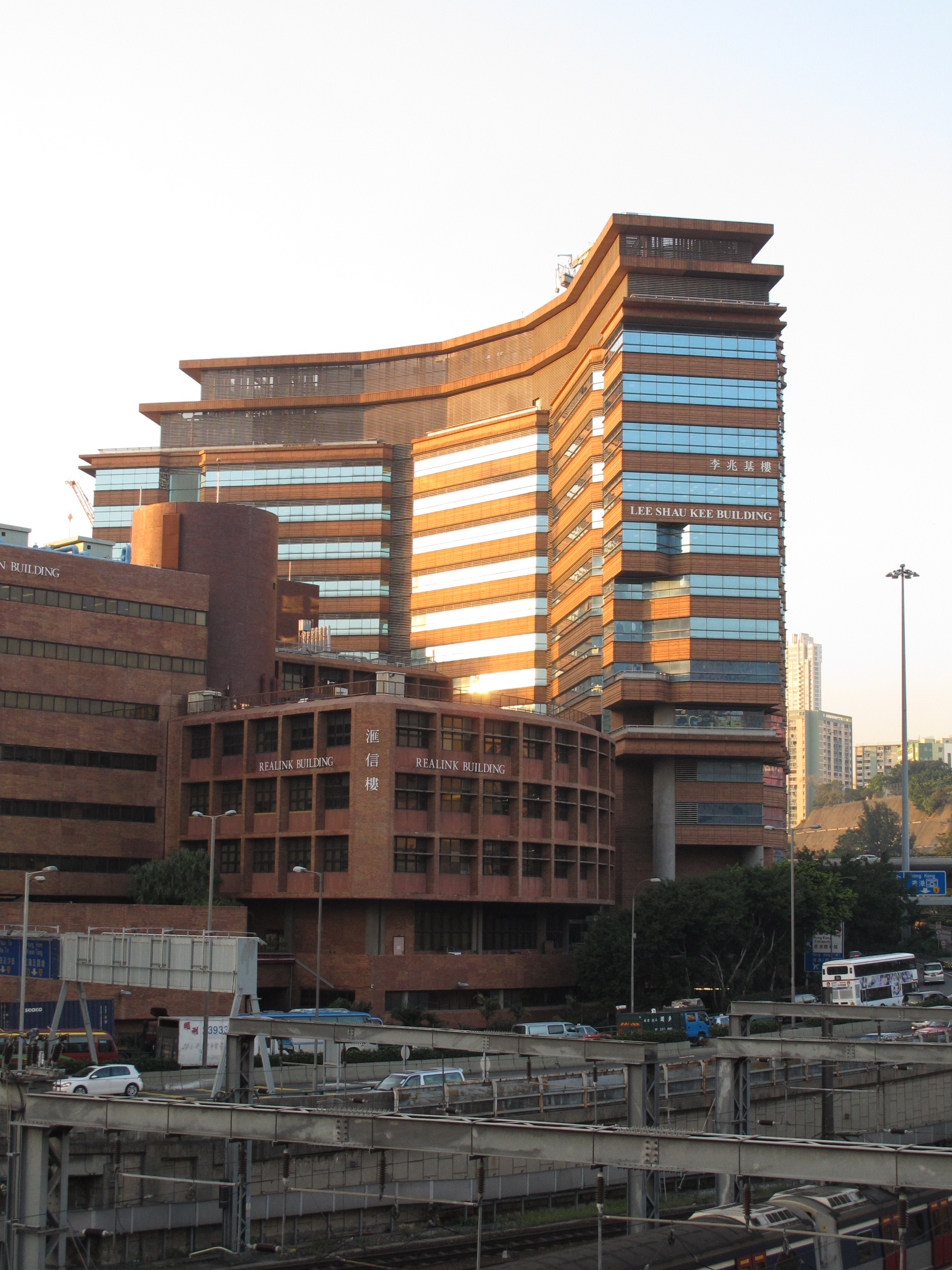
Y Core, 2013

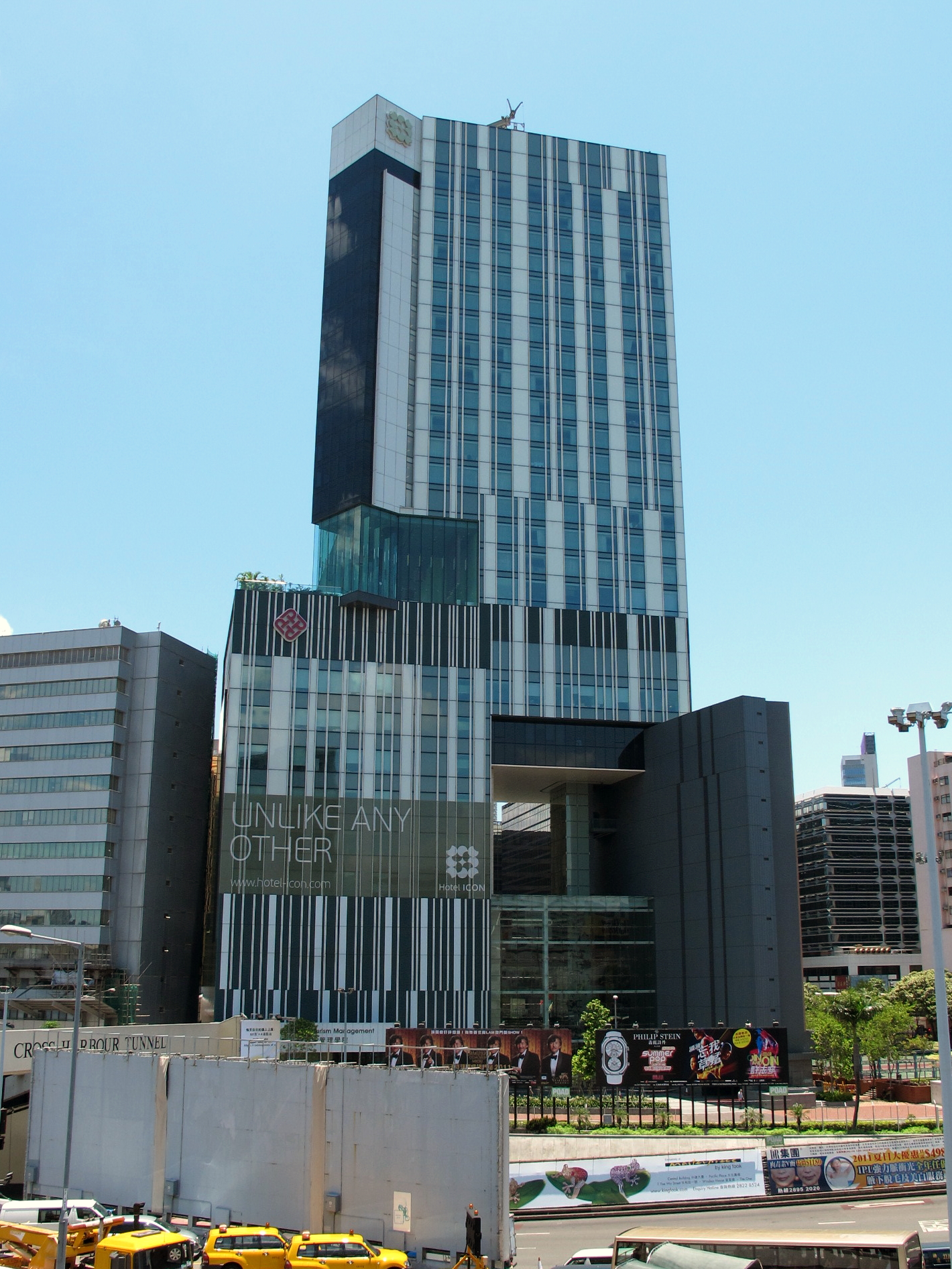
Hotel ICON, 2011

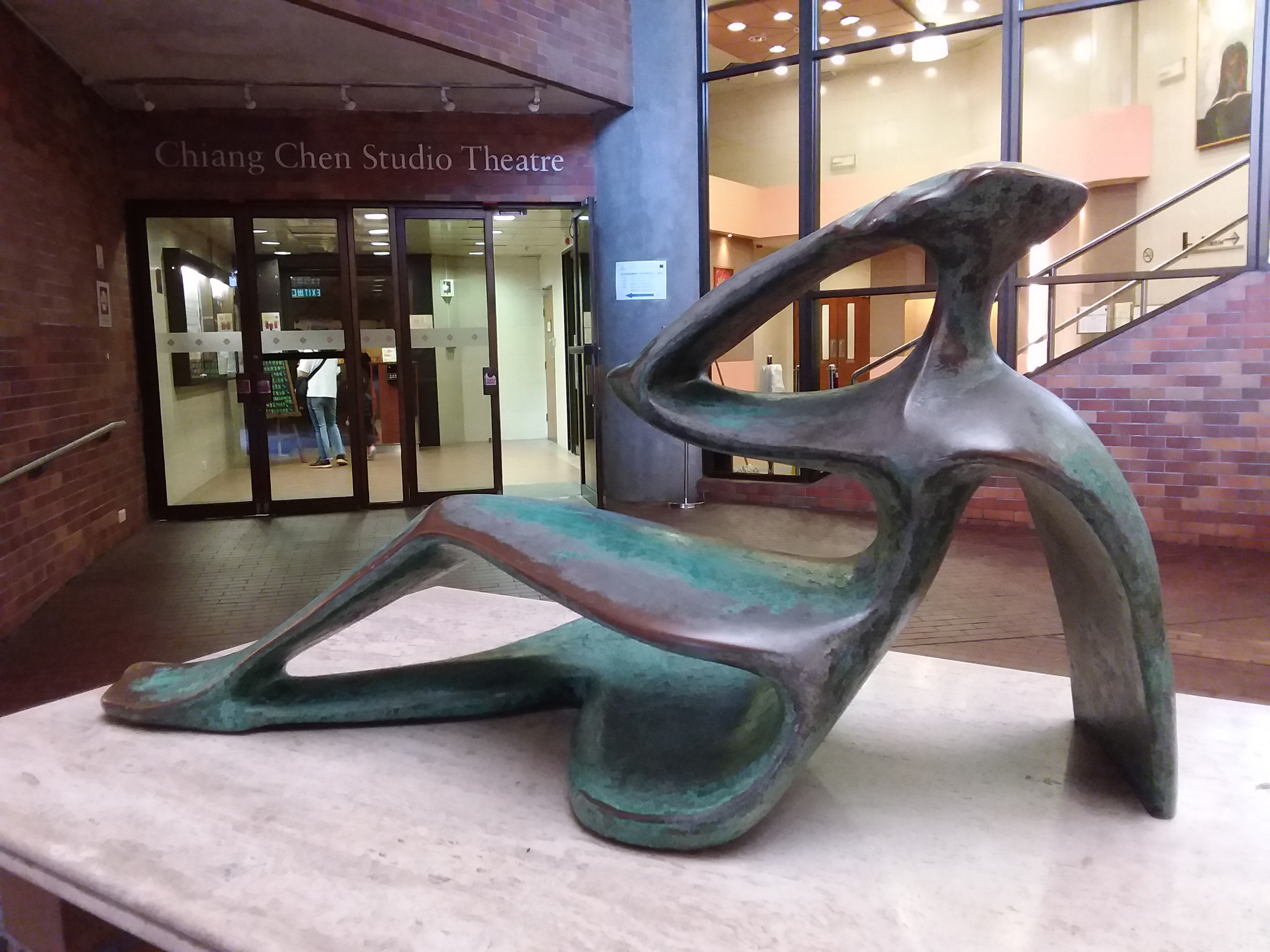
Chiang Chen Studio Theatre, 2019

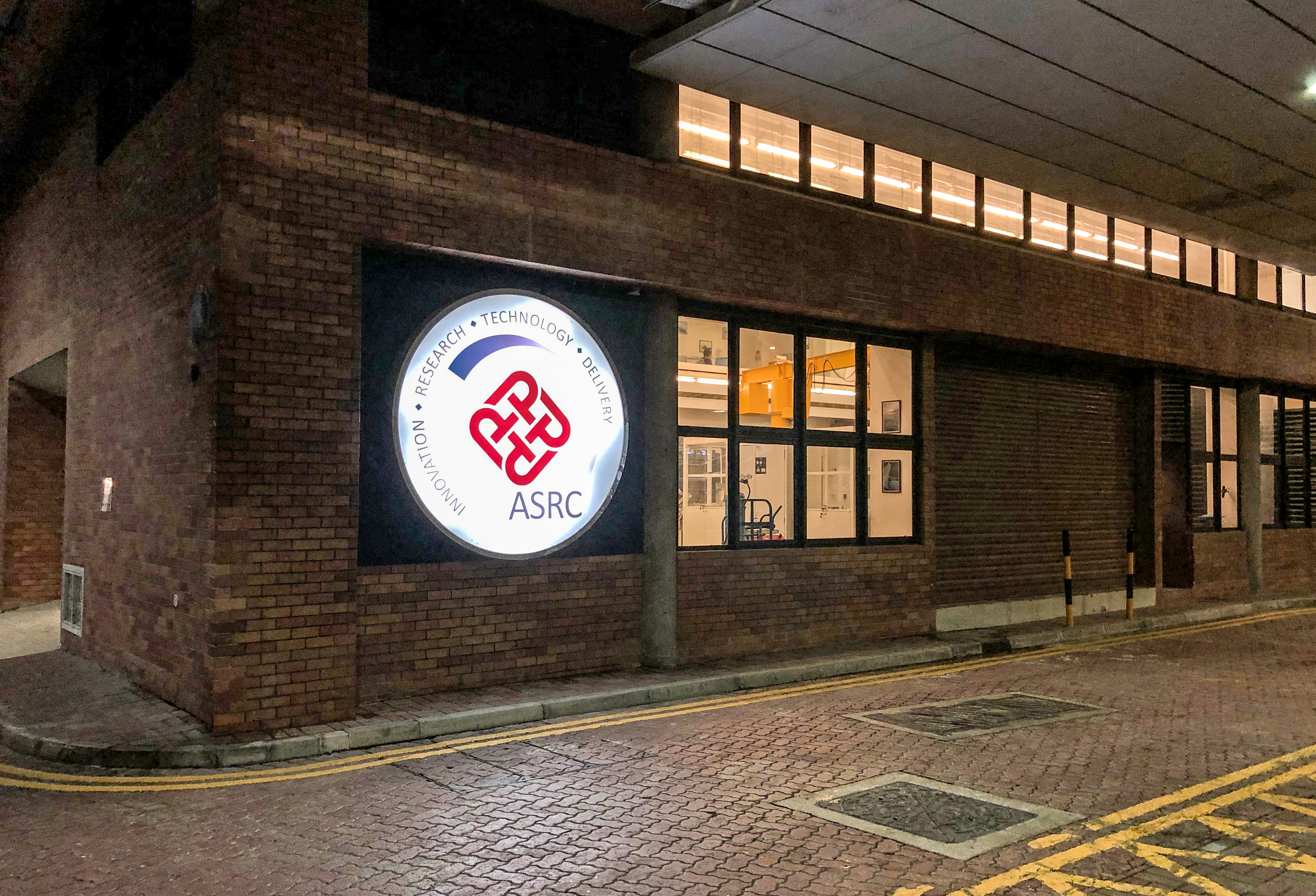
Aviation Services Research Centre, 2019

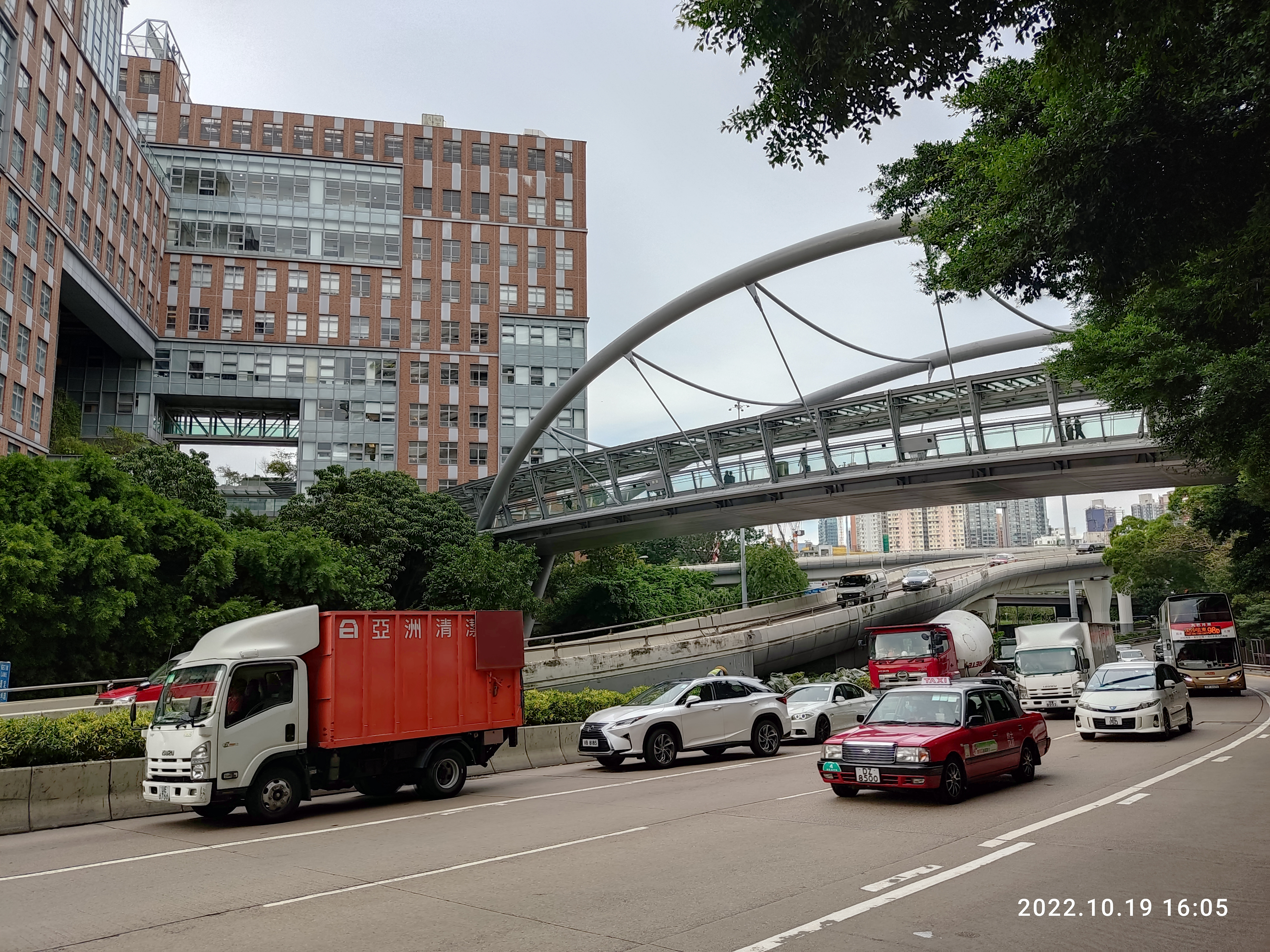
Block Z and Link Bridge, 2022

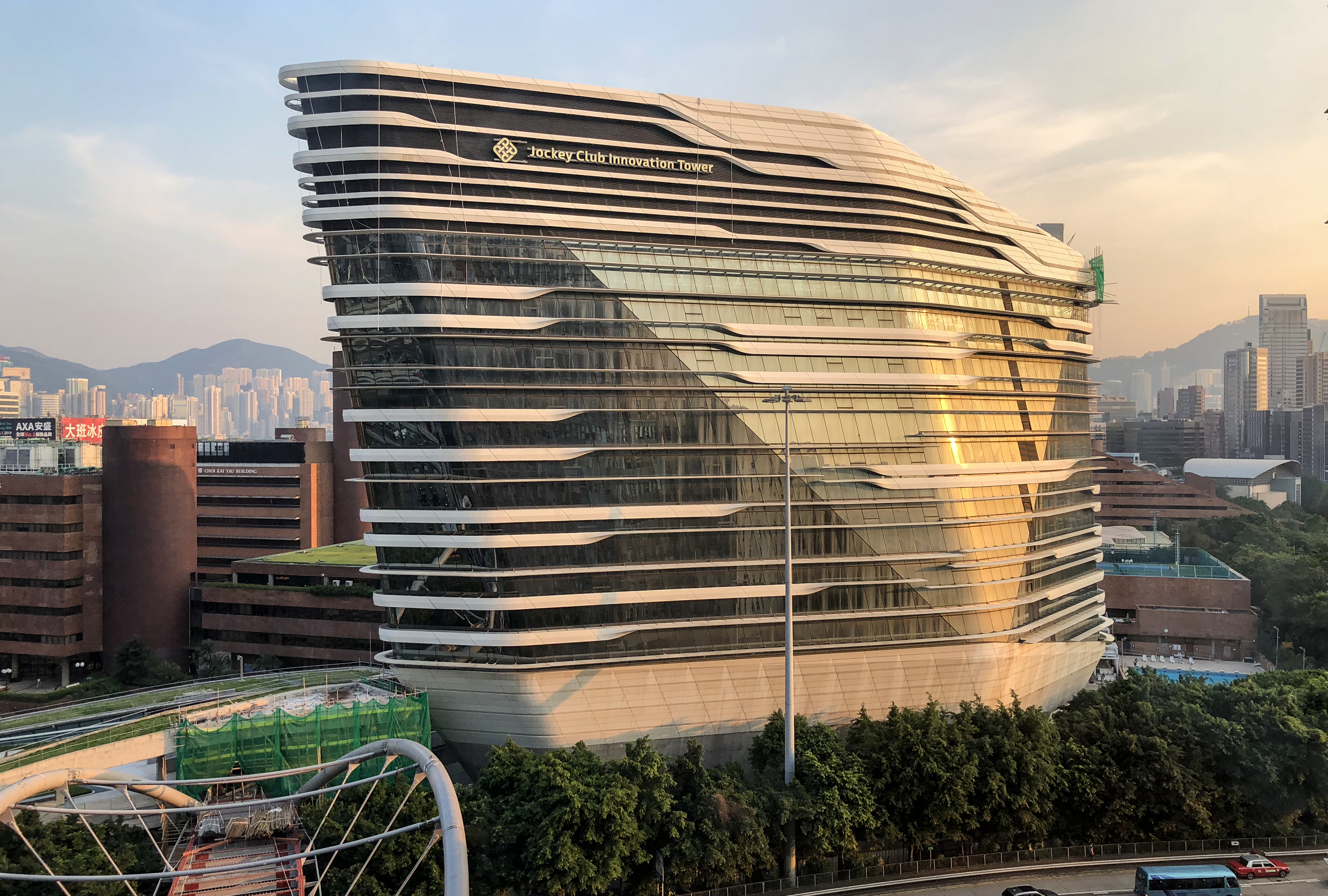
School of Design Tower, 2018

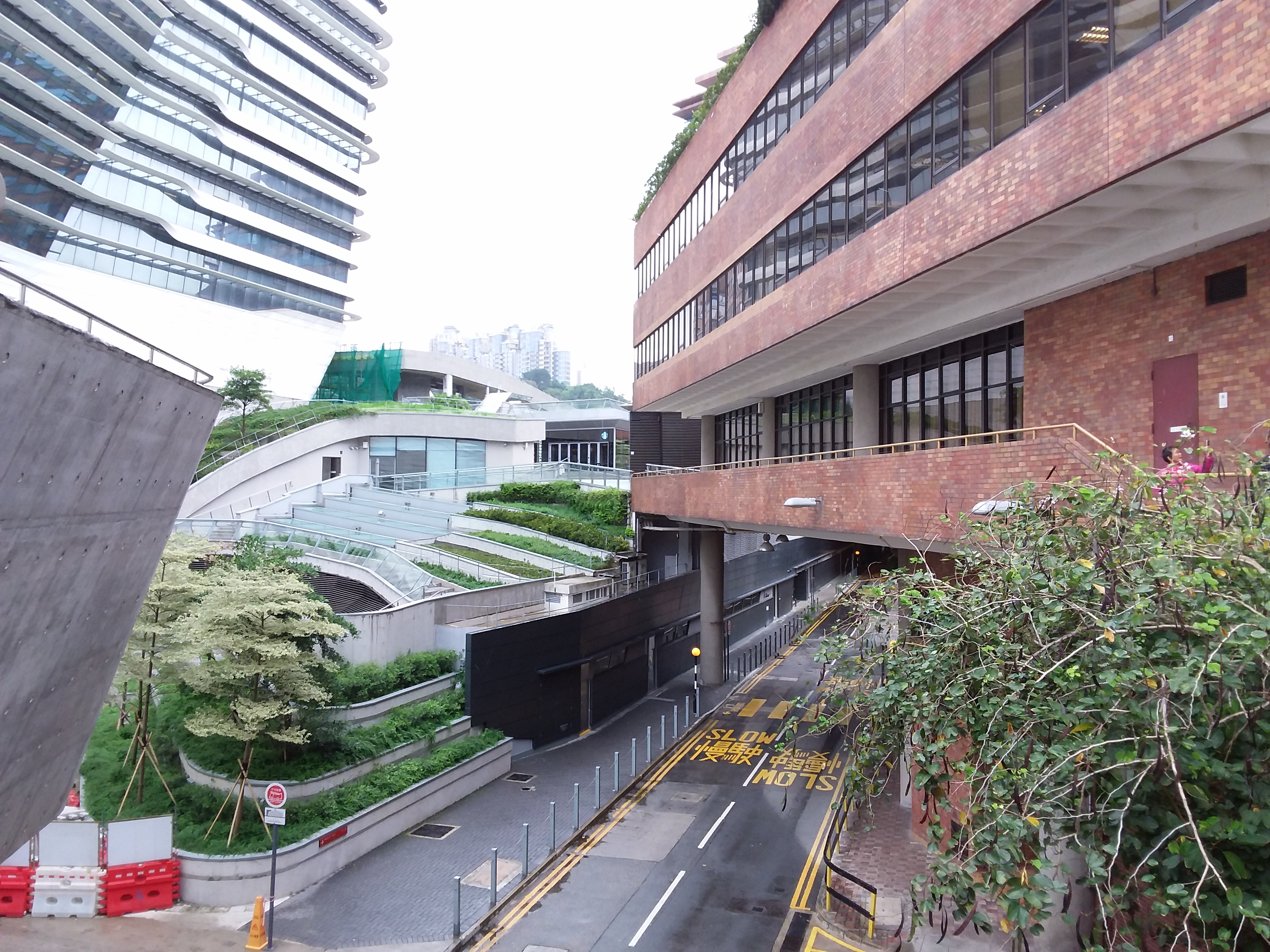
X Core, 2019

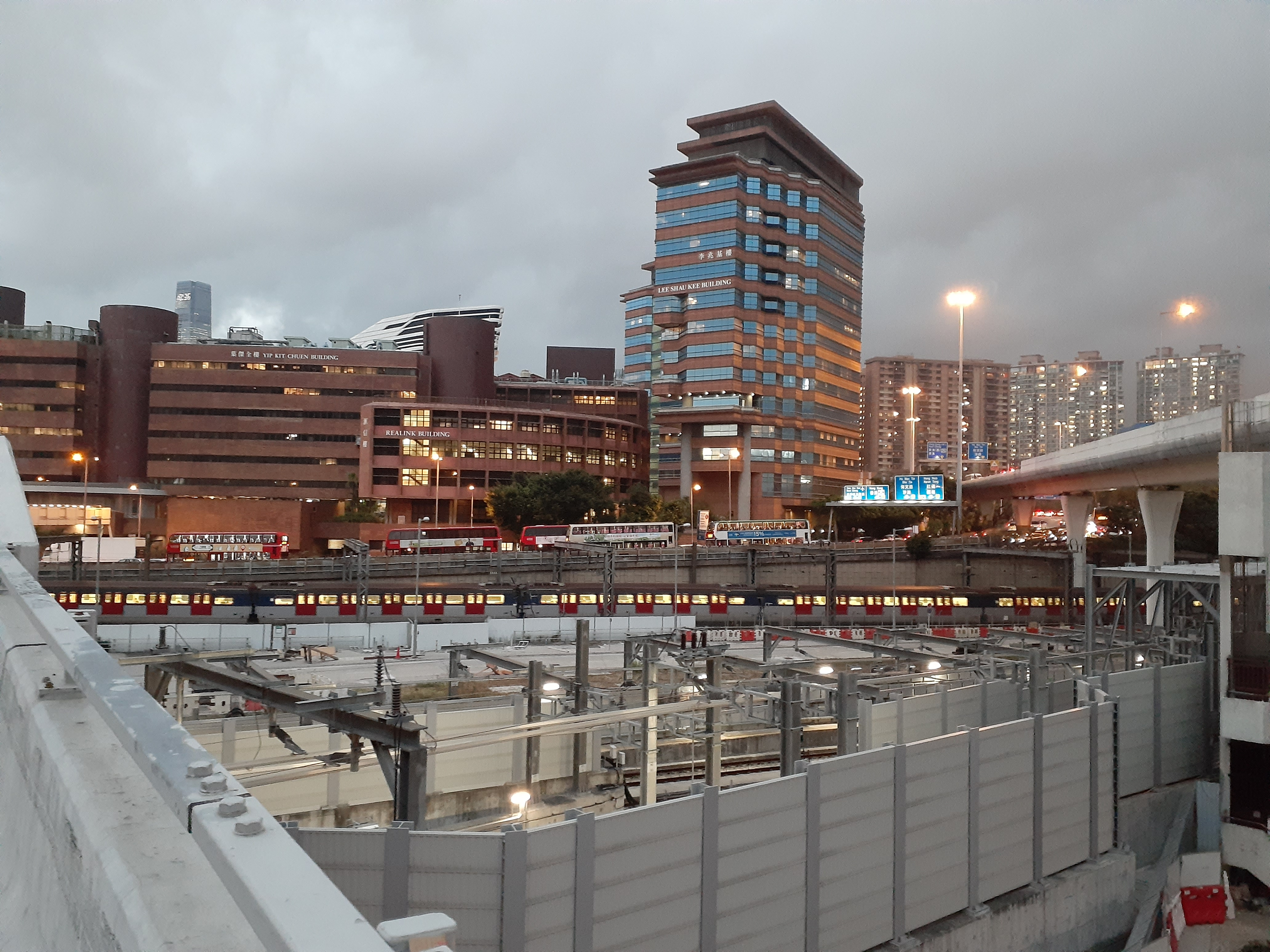
Hung Hom Campus, 2020

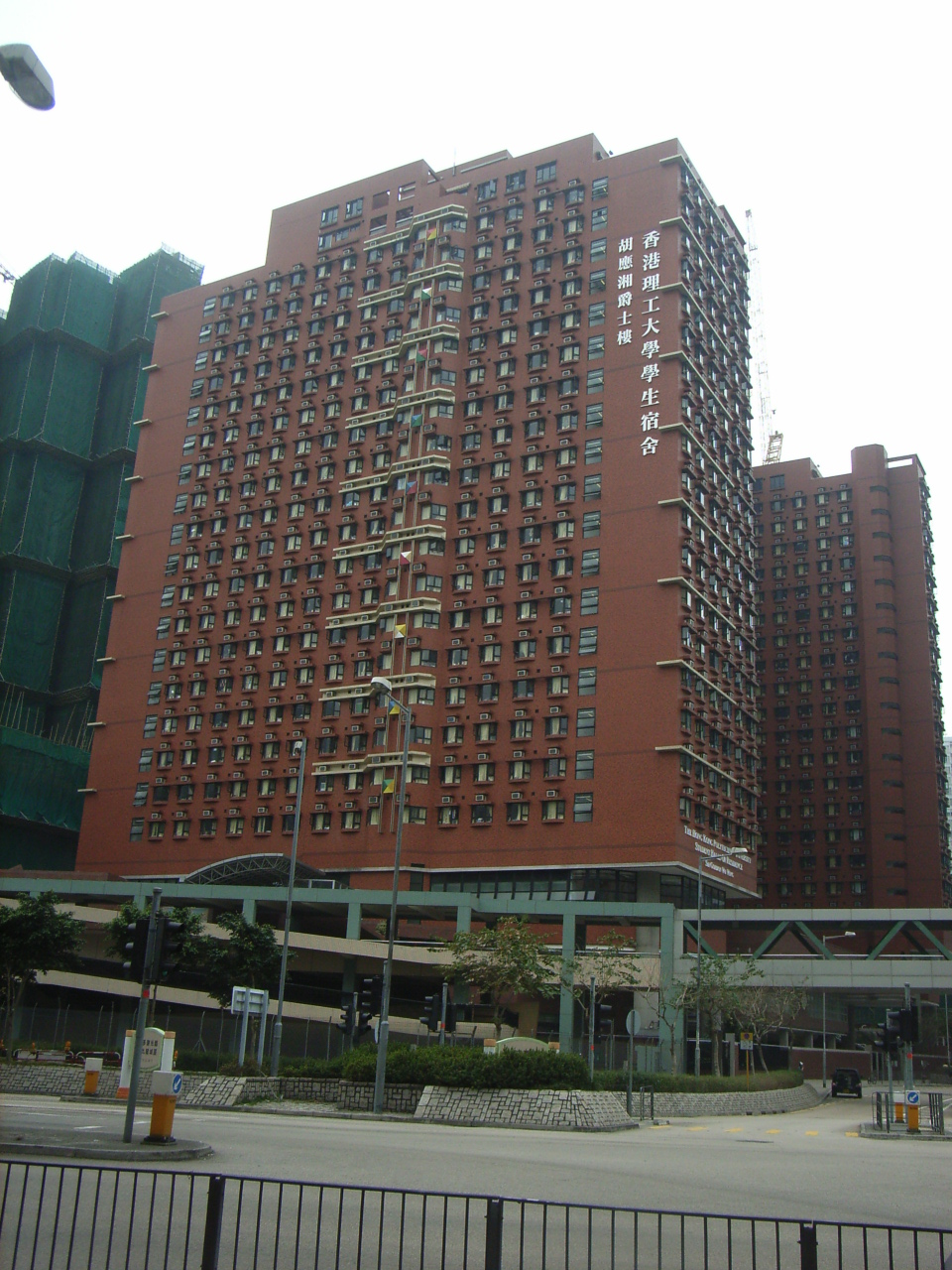
PolyU Student Halls of Residence (Hung Hom)

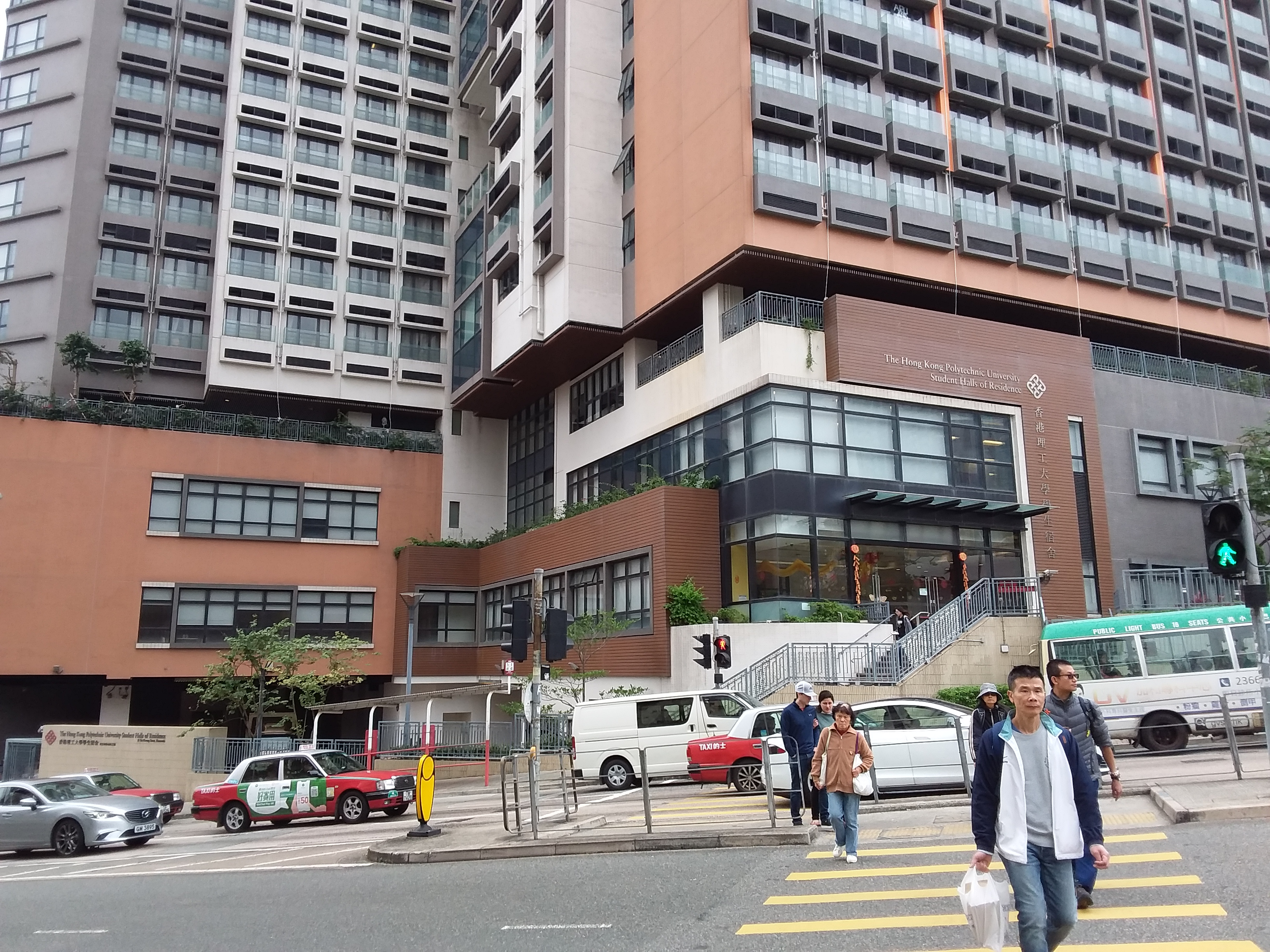
PolyU Student Halls of Residence (Homantin)

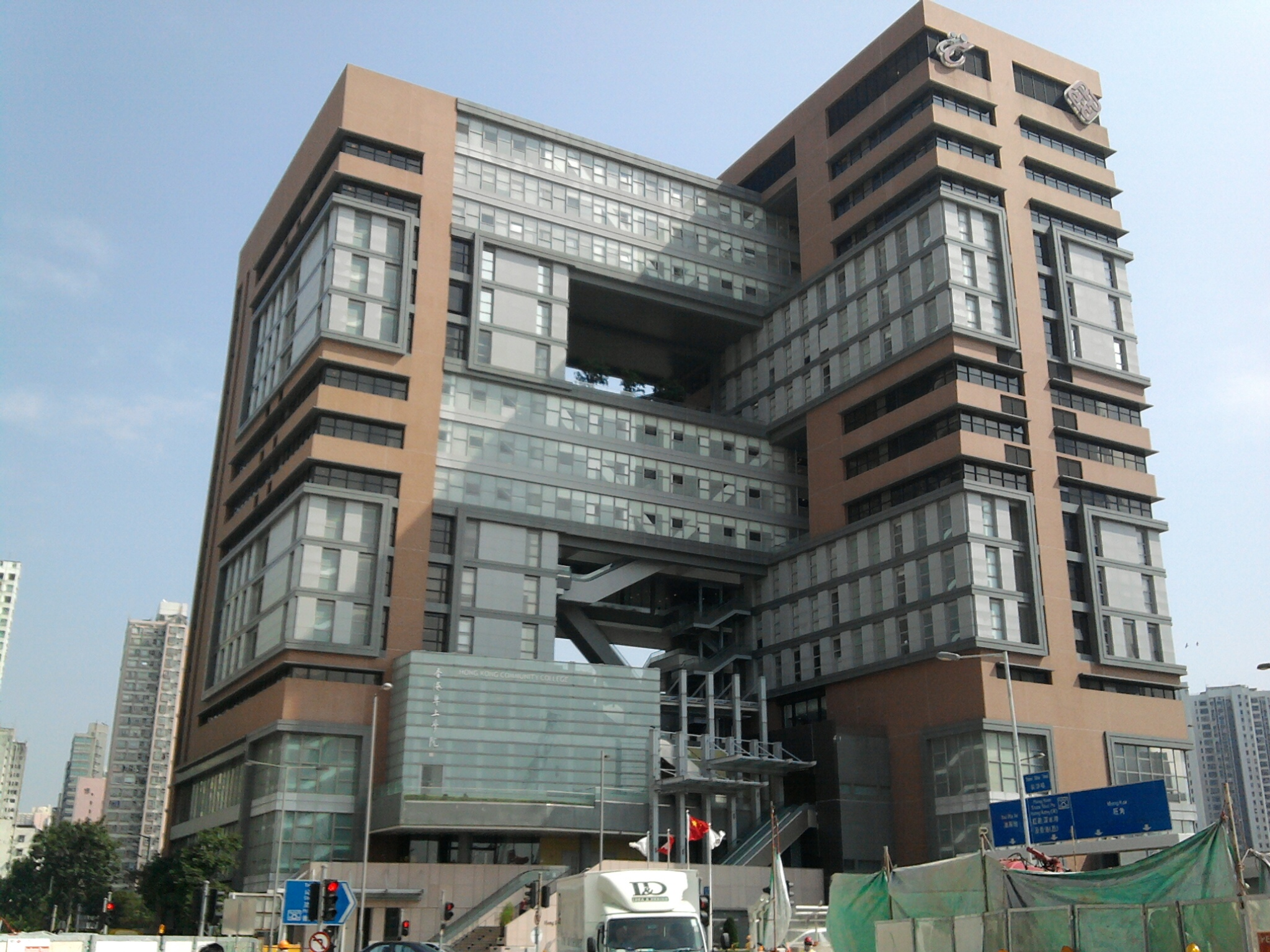
PolyU West Kowloon Campus, 2012

== See also ==
- Education in Hong Kong
- Hong Kong

== Bibliography ==
- Waters, D. D., A brief history of technical education in Hong Kong – with special reference to the Polytechnic University (2002).
