= Hung Uk Tsuen =

Village in Yuen Long District, Hong Kong

Coordinates: 22.441679°N 114.003405°E

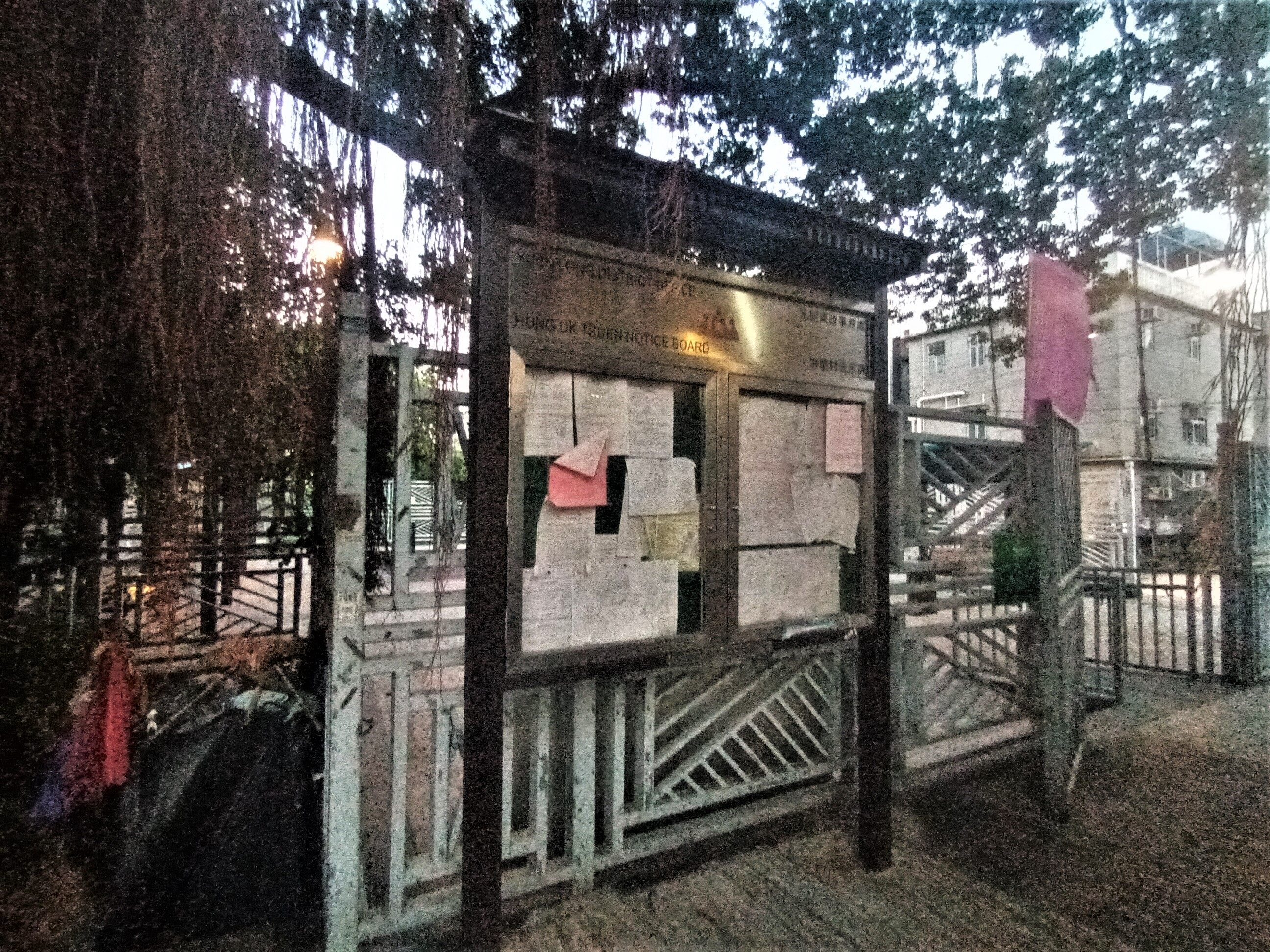
Village notice board in Hung Uk Tsuen.

Hung Uk Tsuen (Chinese: 洪屋村) is a village in Ping Shan, Yuen Long District, Hong Kong.

== Administration ==
Hung Uk Tsuen is a recognized village under the New Territories Small House Policy. It is one of the 37 villages represented within the Ping Shan Rural Committee. For electoral purposes, Hung Uk Tsuen is part of the Ping Shan Central constituency.

== History ==
Hung Uk Tsuen is one of the three wais (walled villages) and six tsuens (villages) established by the Tang Clan of Ping Shan, namely: Sheung Cheung Wai, Kiu Tau Wai, Fui Sha Wai, Hang Tau Tsuen, Hang Mei Tsuen, Tong Fong Tsuen, San Tsuen, Hung Uk Tsuen and San Hei Tsuen.

At the time of the 1911 census, the population of Hung Uk Tsuen was 120. The number of males was 56.

== See also ==
- Ping Shan Heritage Trail
