= San Hei Tsuen =

Coordinates: 22.439015°N 114.007399°E

San Hei Tsuen (Chinese: 新起村) is a village in Ping Shan, Yuen Long District, Hong Kong.

== History ==
San Hei Tsuen is one of the three wais (walled villages) and six tsuens (villages) established by the Tang Clan of Ping Shan, namely: Sheung Cheung Wai, Kiu Tau Wai, Fui Sha Wai, Hang Tau Tsuen, Hang Mei Tsuen, Tong Fong Tsuen, San Tsuen, Hung Uk Tsuen and San Hei Tsuen.

== Today ==
The area houses several industrial buildings, as well as temporary workshops and village houses.

== See also ==
- Ping Shan Heritage Trail
