= Ping Shan San Tsuen =

Village in Hong Kong

Coordinates: 22.441641°N 114.007748°E

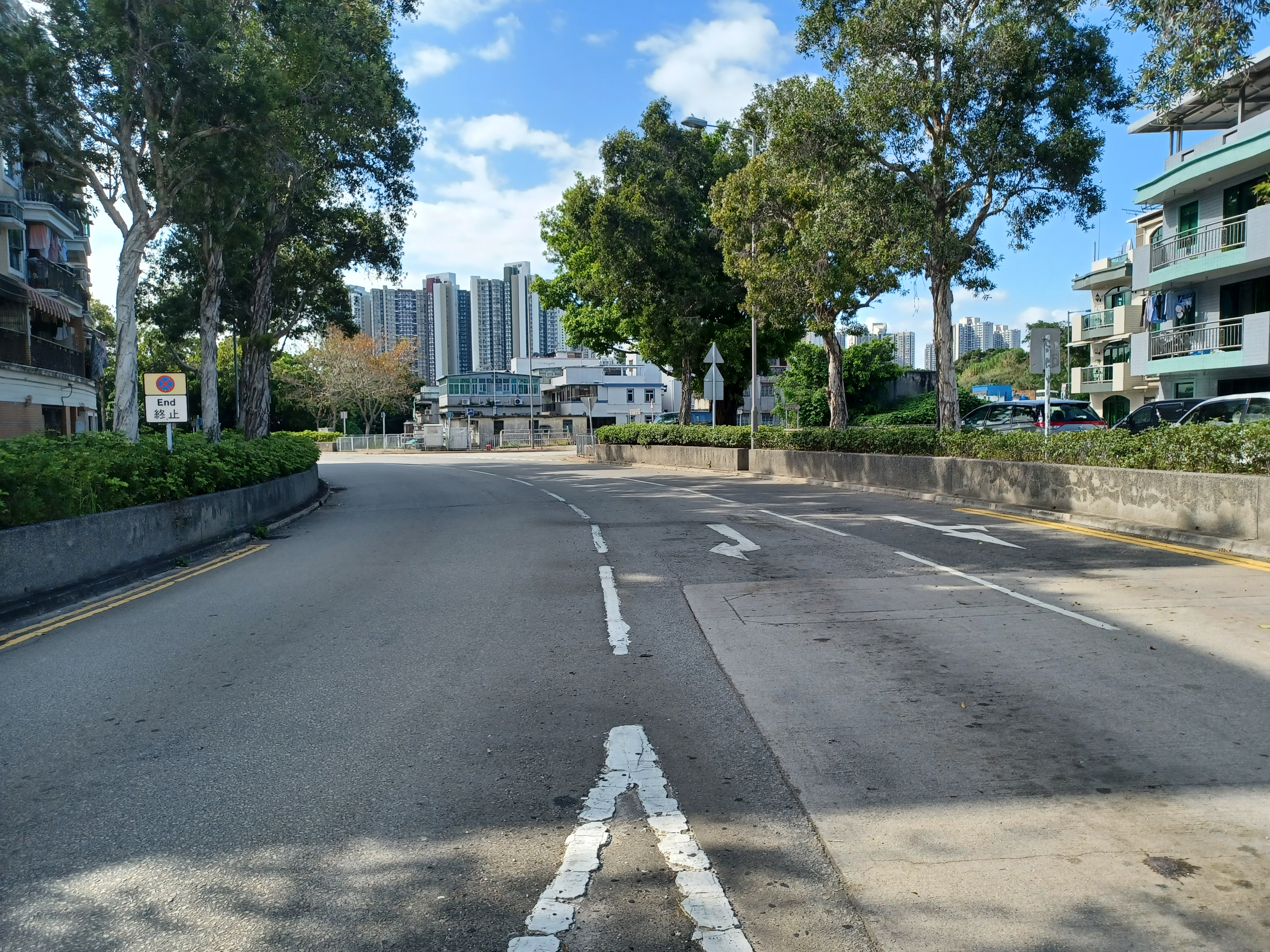
Ping Kwai Road (屏葵路) at Ping Shan San Tsuen.

Ping Shan San Tsuen (Chinese: 屏山新村) is a village in Ping Shan, Yuen Long District, Hong Kong.

== Administration ==
Ping Shan San Tsuen is a recognized village under the New Territories Small House Policy.

== History ==
Ping Shan San Tsuen is one of the three wais (walled villages) and six tsuens (villages) established by the Tang Clan of Ping Shan, namely: Sheung Cheung Wai, Kiu Tau Wai, Fui Sha Wai, Hang Tau Tsuen, Hang Mei Tsuen, Tong Fong Tsuen, Ping Shan San Tsuen, Hung Uk Tsuen and San Hei Tsuen.

At the time of the 1911 census, the population of San Tsuen was 50. The number of males was 22.

== See also ==
- Ping Shan Heritage Trail
