= Tong Fong Tsuen =

Village in Ping Shan, Yuen Long District, Hong Kong

Coordinates: 22.443267°N 114.007389°E

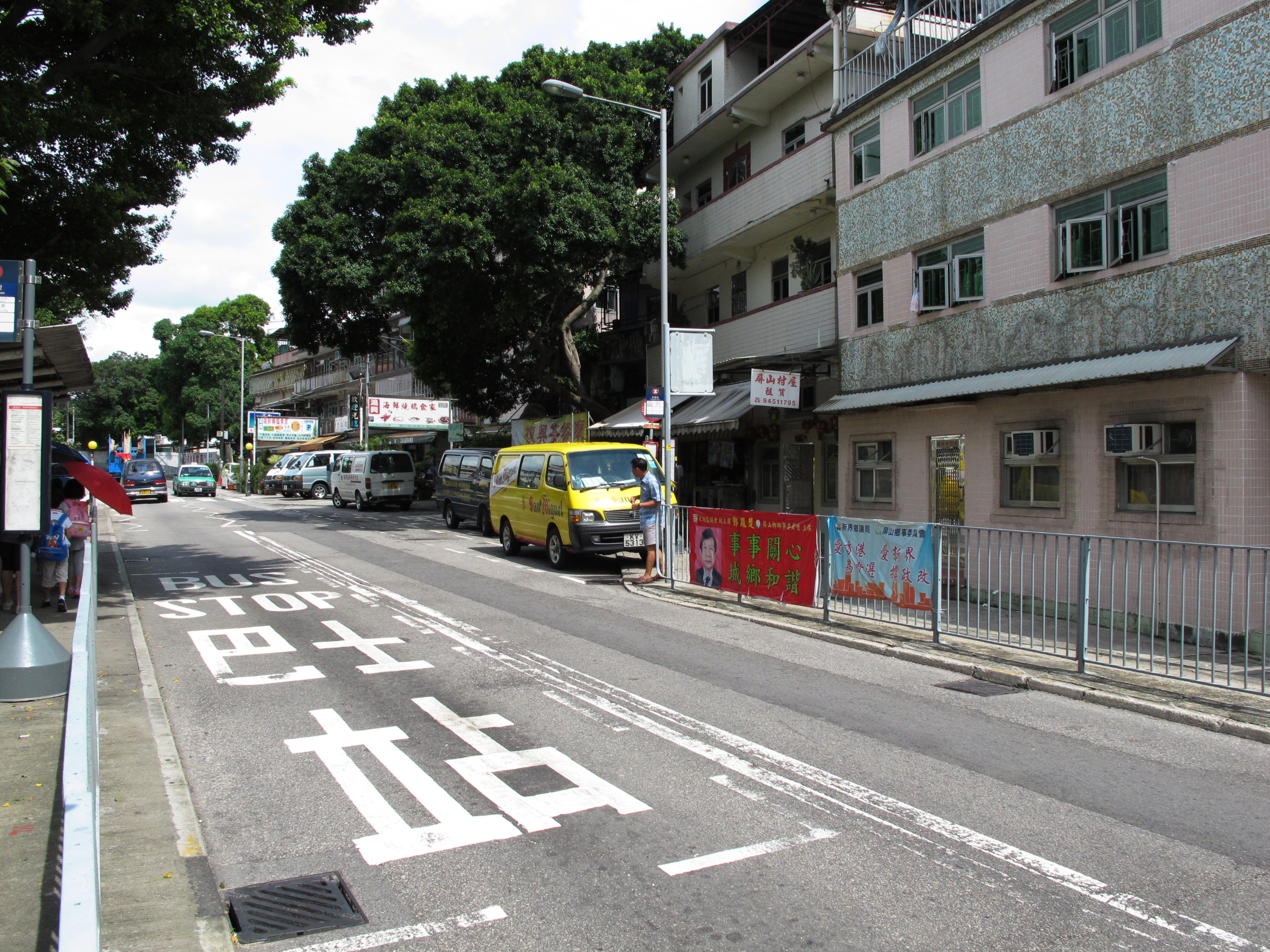
Ping Ha Road (屏廈路) at Tong Fong Tsuen.

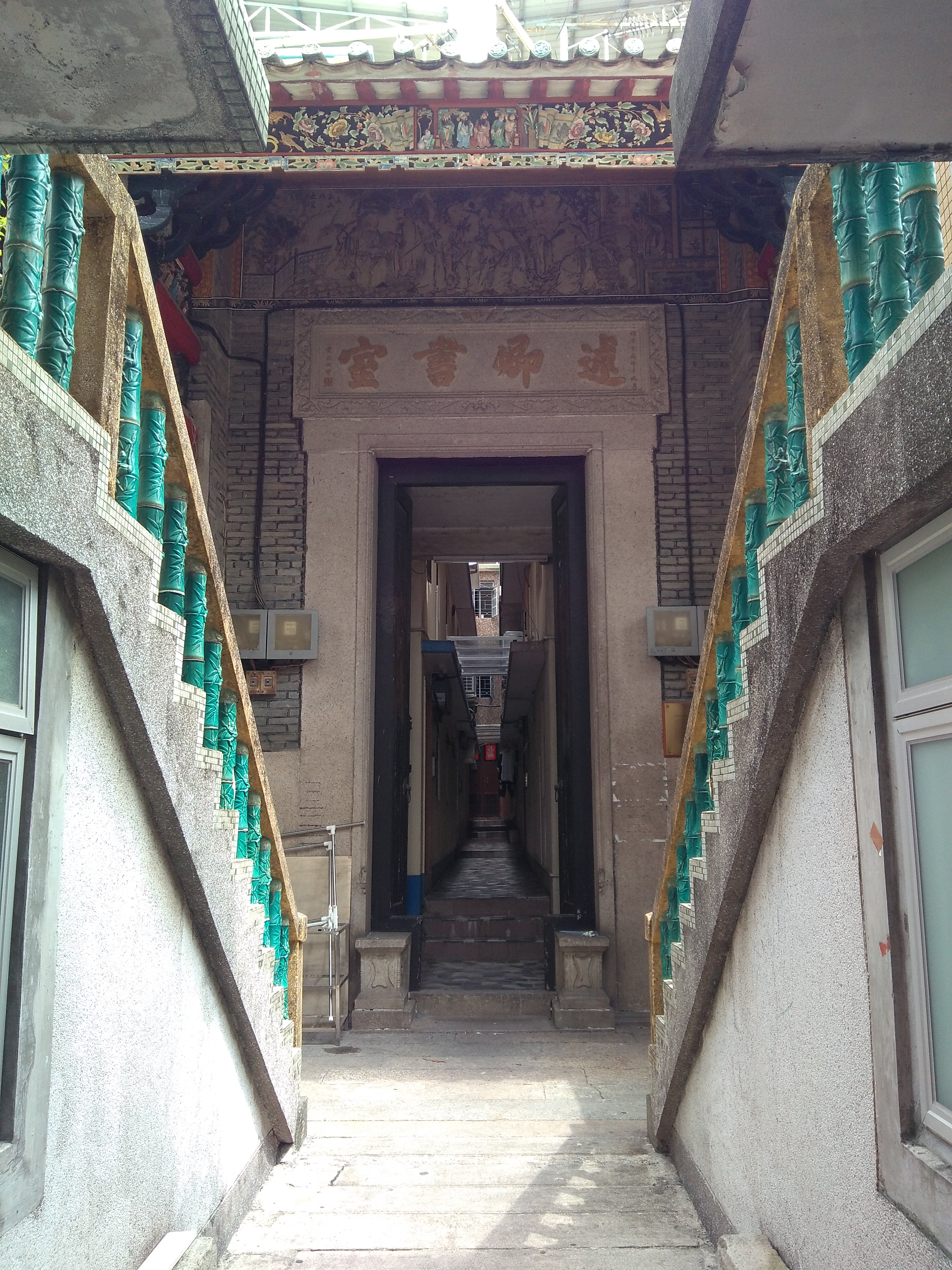
Entrance Hall of Shut Hing Study Hall in Tong Fong Tsuen.

Tong Fong Tsuen (Chinese: 塘坊村) is a village in Ping Shan, Yuen Long District, Hong Kong.

== Administration ==
Tong Fong Tsuen is a recognized village under the New Territories Small House Policy.

== History ==
Tong Fong Tsuen is one of the three wais (walled villages) and six tsuens (villages) established by the Tang Clan of Ping Shan, namely: Sheung Cheung Wai, Kiu Tau Wai, Fui Sha Wai, Hang Tau Tsuen, Hang Mei Tsuen, Tong Fong Tsuen, San Tsuen, Hung Uk Tsuen and San Hei Tsuen.

At the time of the 1911 census, the population of Tong Fong was 148. The number of males was 83.

== See also ==
- Ping Shan Heritage Trail
- Tong Fong Tsuen stop
