= Ping Shan =

Area of Hong Kong

Coordinates: 22.444°N 114.008°E

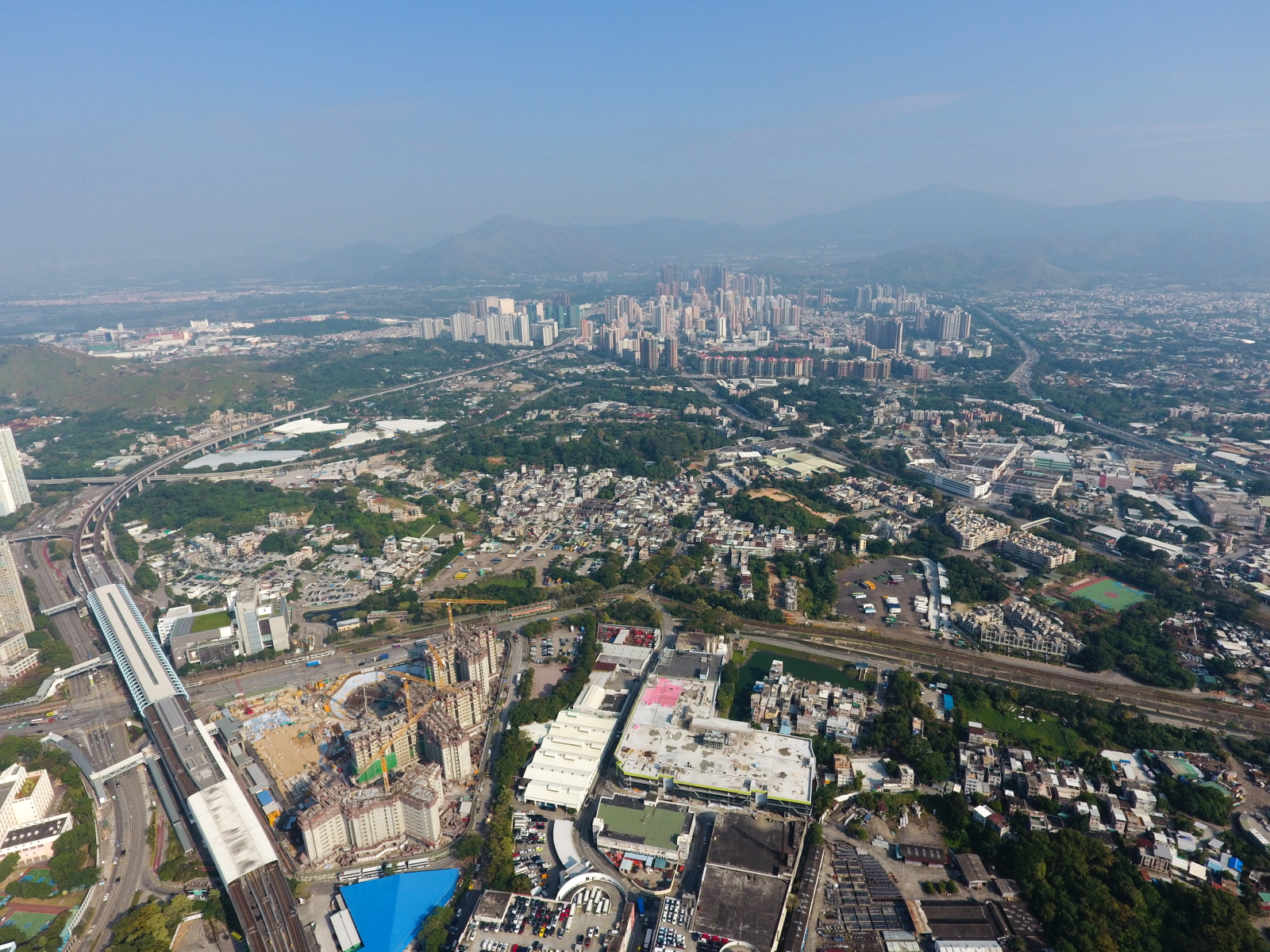
Ping Shan in 2016.

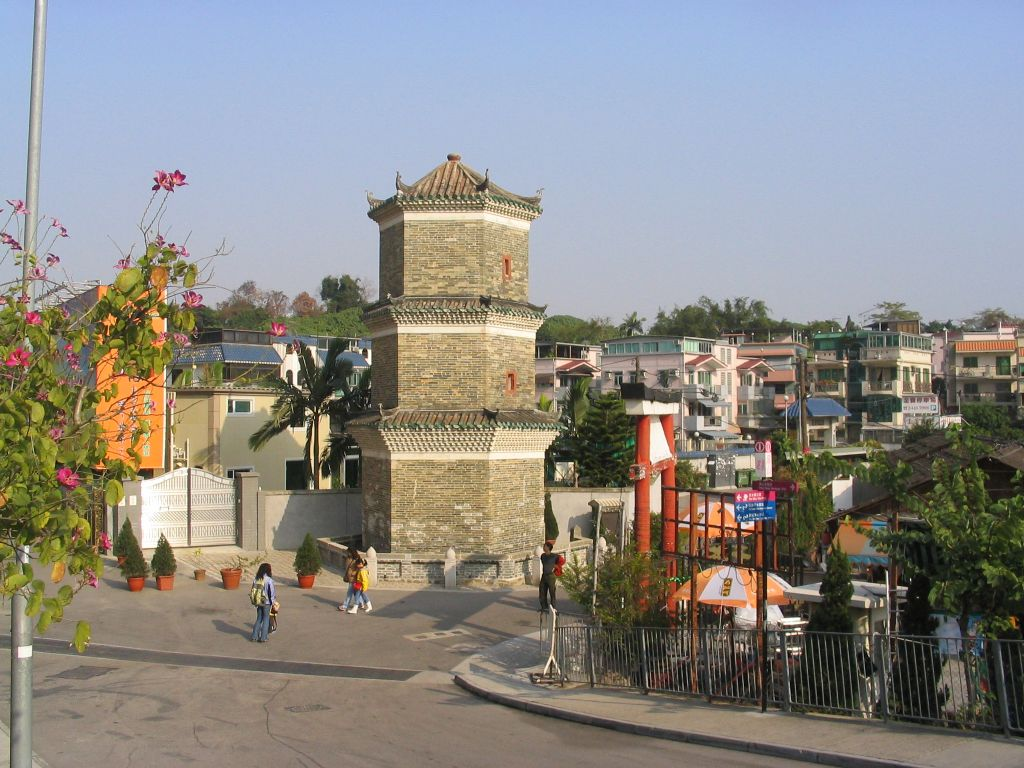
Tsui Sing Lau Pagoda, a declared monument, part of the Ping Shan Heritage Trail.

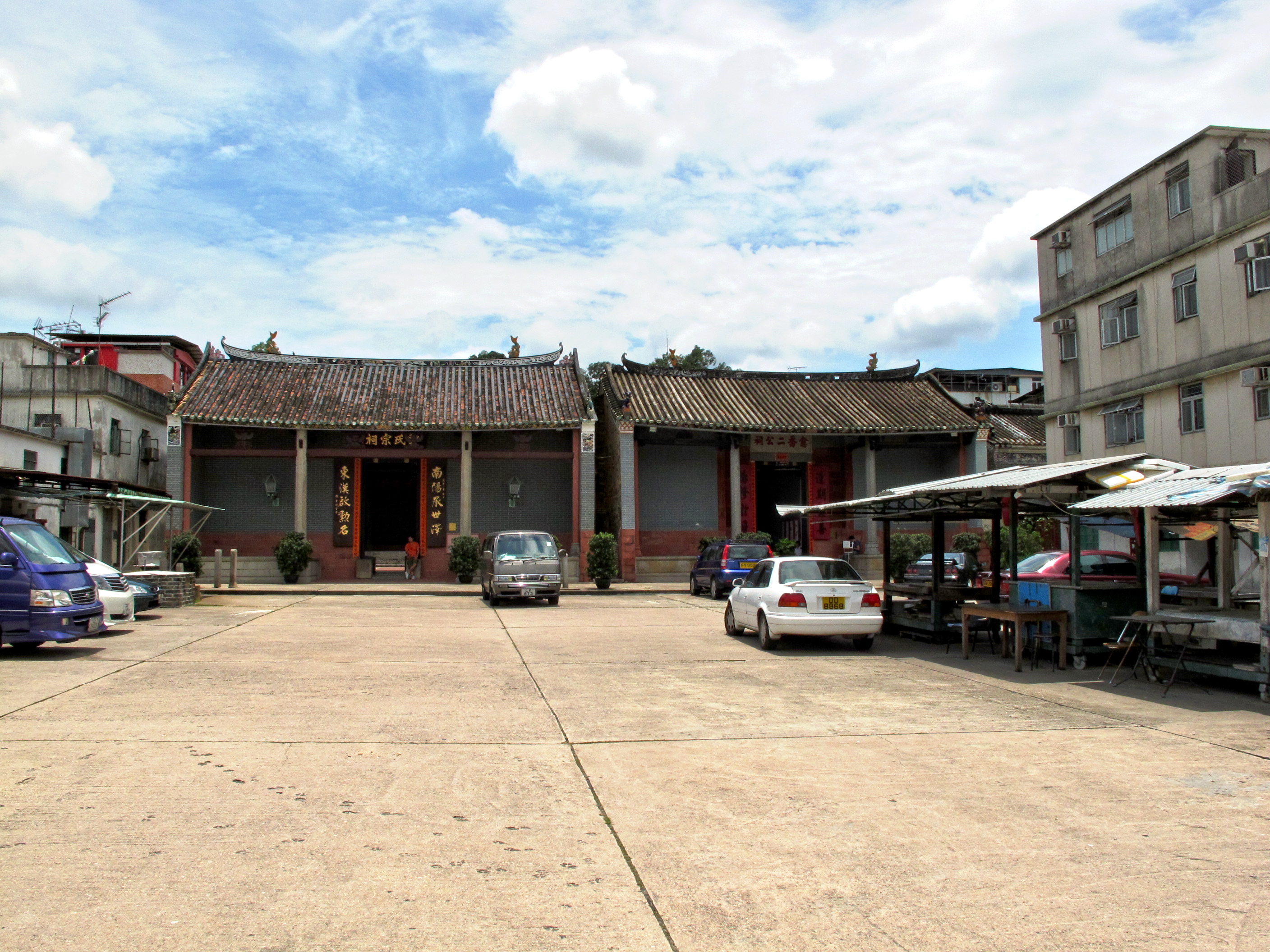
Ping Shan Tang Ancestral Hall and Yu Kiu Ancestral Hall are part of the Ping Shan Heritage Trail.

Ping Shan (Chinese: 屏山; lit. 'Screen Peak') is an area in the New Territories, Hong Kong. It is located west of Yuen Long Town and Shui Pin Wai, and south of Tin Shui Wai. Administratively, it is part of the Yuen Long District.

== Geography ==
Although sandwiched between Yuen Long New Town and Tin Shui Wai New Town, the area remains largely rural and villages spread in the area. Tsui Sing Lau Pagoda and sea shore was once splendid picture surviving till early 20th century. Ping Shan later became landlocked due to sedimentation along the estuary in water north.

Ping Shan comprises three wais (walled villages) and six tsuens (villages) established by the Tang Clan, namely: Sheung Cheung Wai, Kiu Tau Wai, Fui Sha Wai, Hang Tau Tsuen, Hang Mei Tsuen, Tong Fong Tsuen, San Tsuen, Hung Uk Tsuen and San Hei Tsuen.

== Sights ==
The Ping Shan Heritage Trail was inaugurated on 12 December 1993 and was the first of its kind in Hong Kong. It includes several declared monuments and graded buildings, such as the Tsui Sing Lau Pagoda.

Tang Ancestral Hall is one of the declared monuments in the area.

== Transportation ==
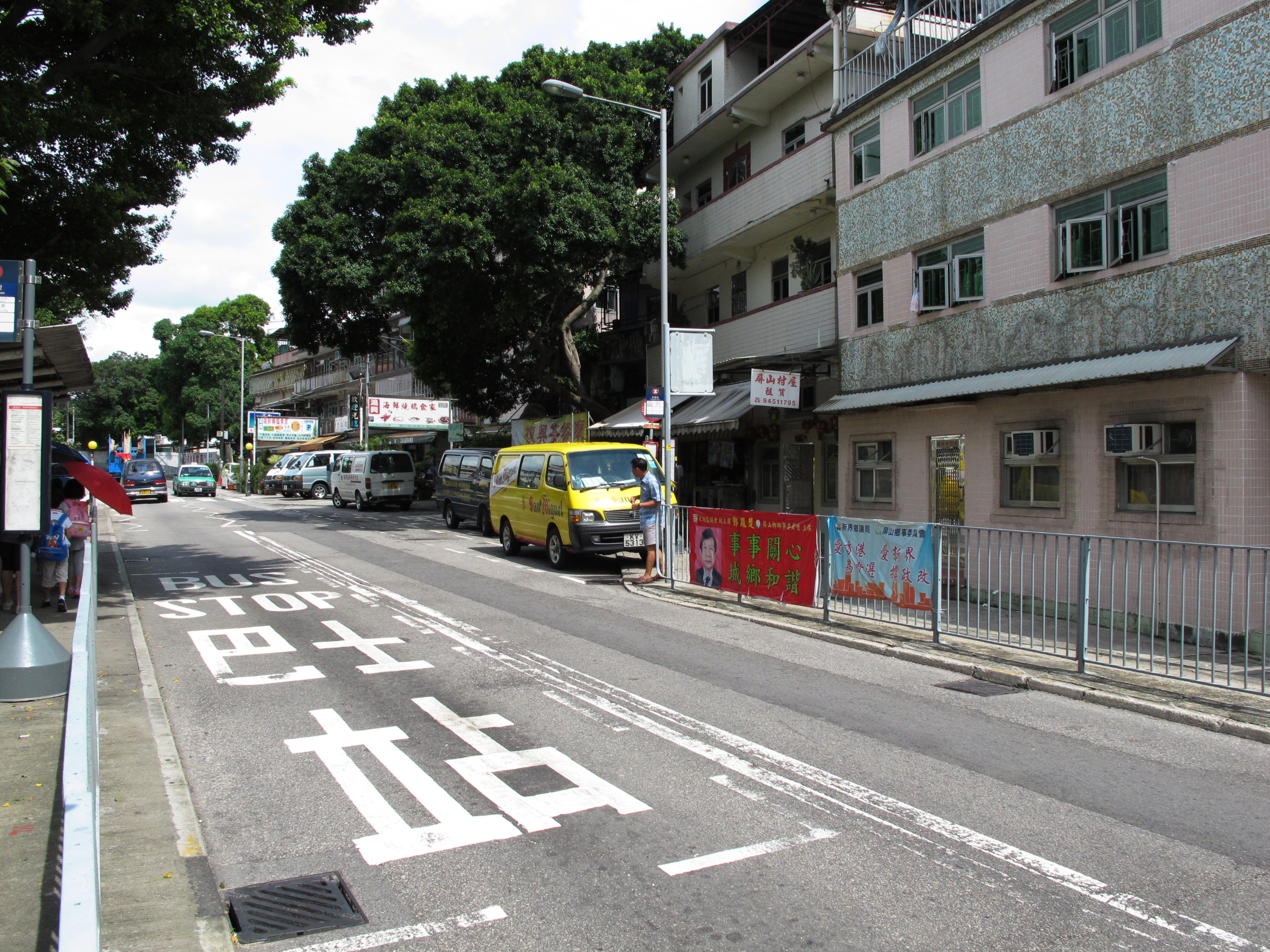
Ping Ha Road at Tong Fong Tsuen.

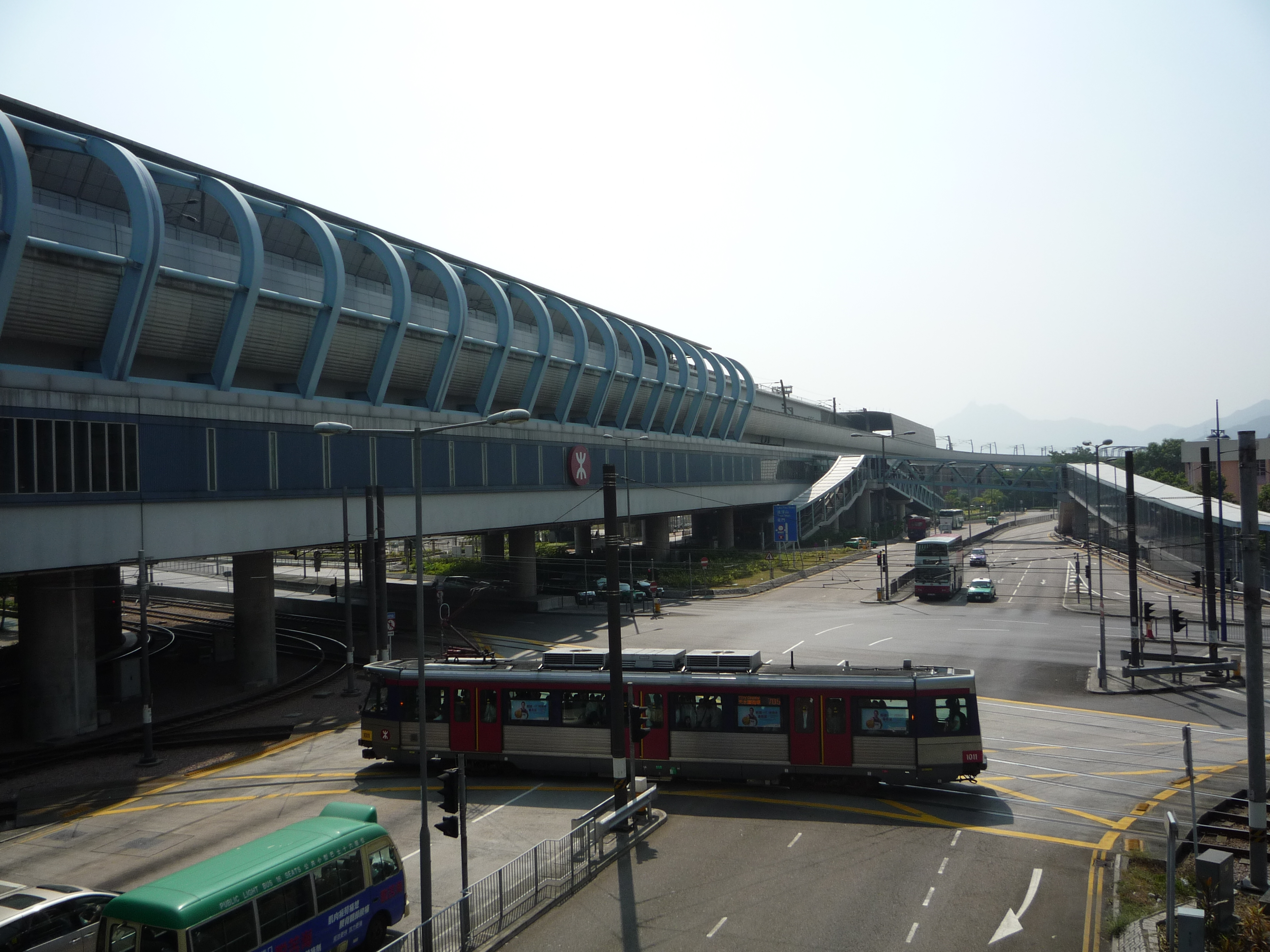
Transport in Ping Shan around Tin Shui Wai station.

Ping Shan is served by the Tin Shui Wai station of the West Rail line and several stations of the Light Rail, including a station named "Ping Shan".

== Education ==
Ping Shan is in Primary One Admission (POA) School Net 72. Within the school net are multiple aided schools (operated independently but funded with government money) and one government school: Tin Shui Wai Government Primary School (天水圍官立小學).
