= Hang Tau Tsuen, Yuen Long District =

Village in Yuen Long District, Hong Kong

Coordinates: 22°26′45″N 114°00′31″E

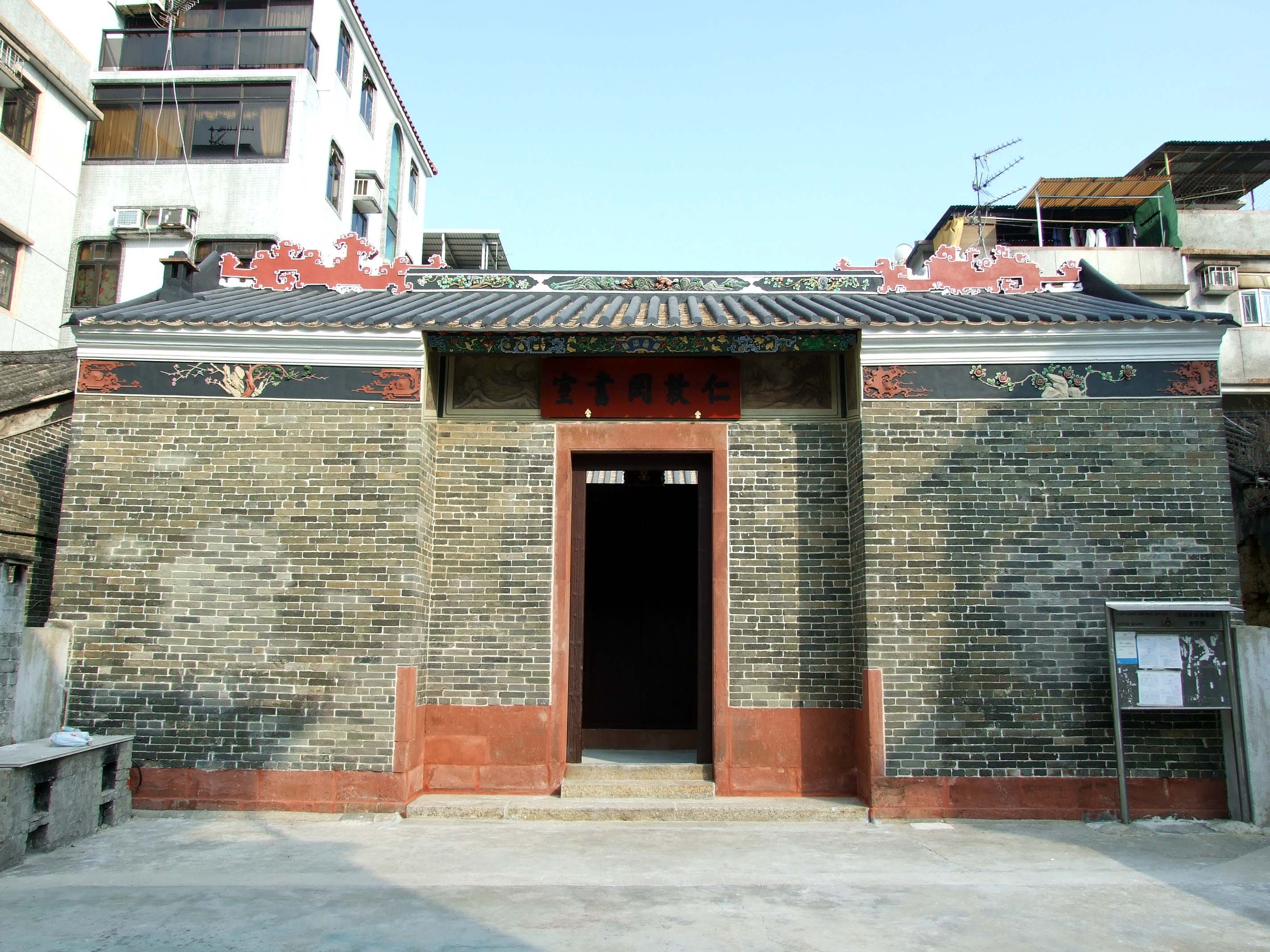
Yan Tun Kong Study Hall (仁敦岡書室) in Hang Tau Tsuen.

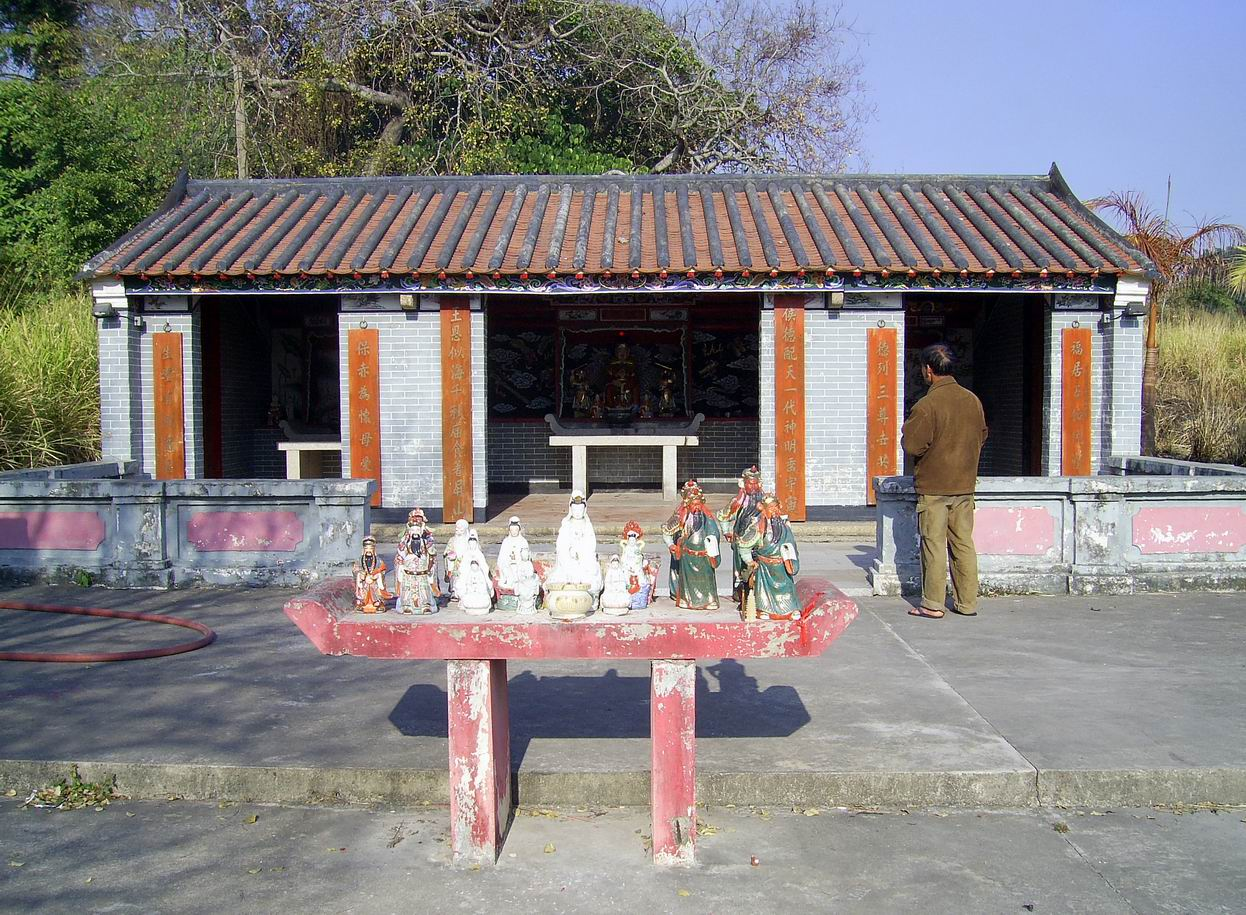
Yeung Hau Temple in Hang Tau Tsuen.

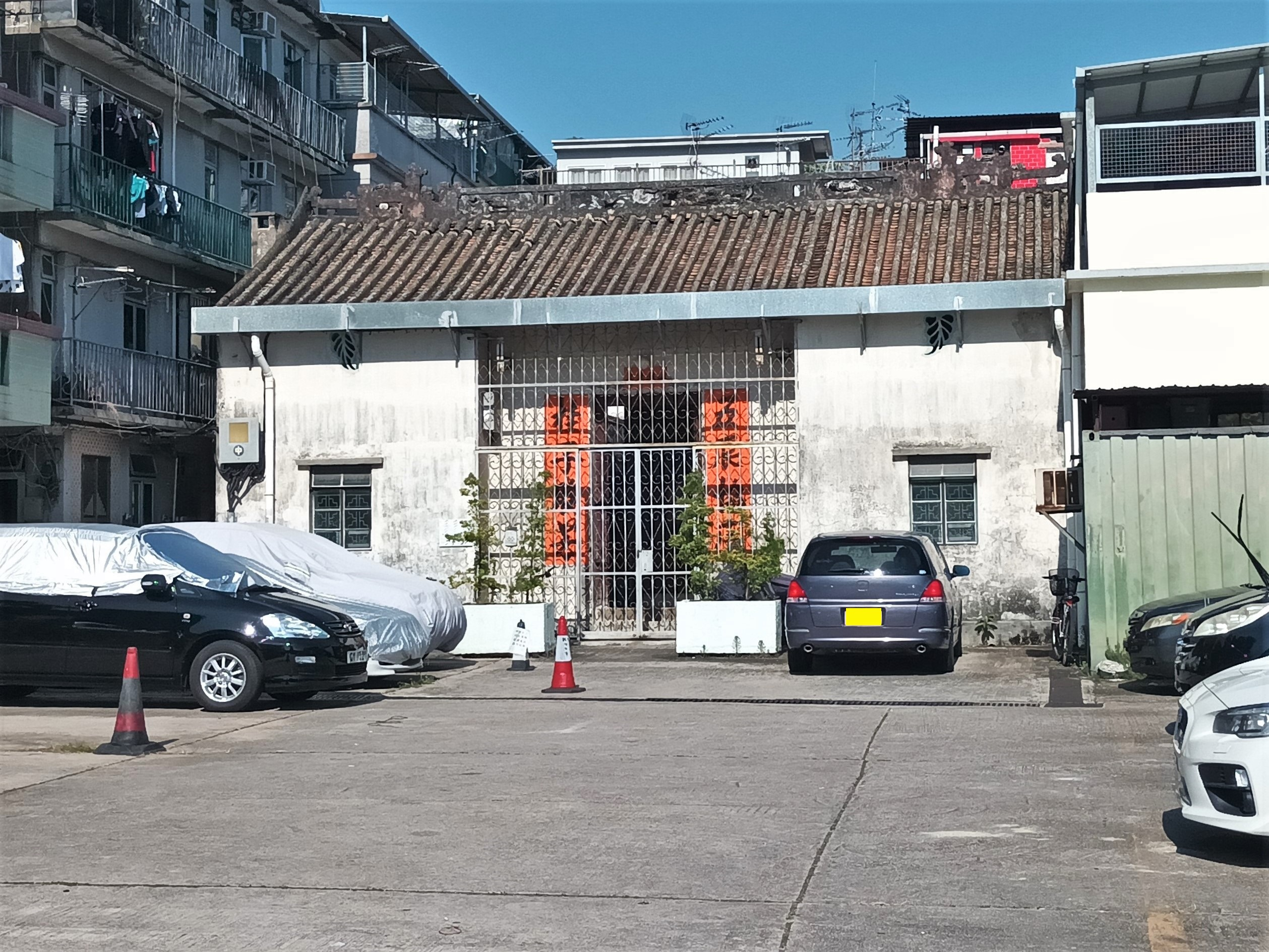
Ng Kwai Tong (五桂堂), an ancestral hall in Hang Tau Tsuen.

Hang Tau Tsuen (Chinese: 坑頭村) is a village in the Ping Shan area of Yuen Long District, in Hong Kong. It is part of the Ping Shan Heritage Trail.

== Administration ==
Hang Tau Tsuen is a recognized village under the New Territories Small House Policy.

== History ==
Hang Tau Tsuen is one of the three wais (walled villages) and six tsuens (villages) established by the Tang Clan of Ping Shan, namely: Sheung Cheung Wai, Kiu Tau Wai, Fui Sha Wai, Hang Tau Tsuen, Hang Mei Tsuen, Tong Fong Tsuen, San Tsuen, Hung Uk Tsuen and San Hei Tsuen.

At the time of the 1911 census, the population of Hang Tau was 394. The number of males was 171.
