= Sheung Cheung Wai =

Walled village in Hong Kong

Sheung Cheung Wai Chinese: 上璋圍
- Village
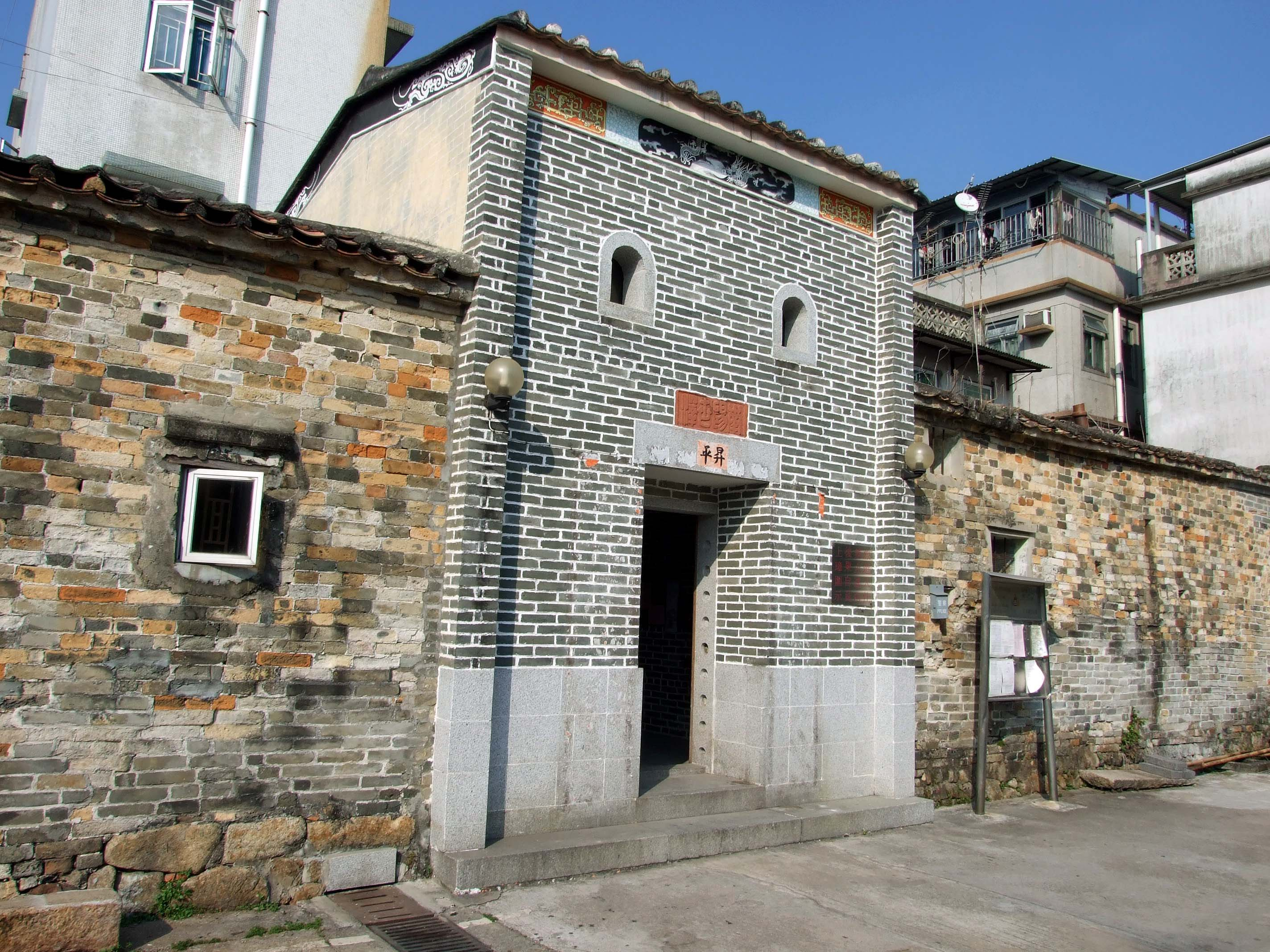
- Entrance gate of Sheung Cheung Wai.

- Location within Hong Kong
- Coordinates: 22.446739°N 114.006539°E
- Country: People's Republic of China
- Special administrative region: Hong Kong
- District: Yuen Long District
- Area: Ping Shan
- Time zone: UTC+8:00 (HKT)

Sheung Cheung Wai (Chinese: 上璋圍) is a walled village in the Ping Shan area of Yuen Long District, in Hong Kong. It is part of the Ping Shan Heritage Trail.

== Administration ==
Sheung Cheung Wai is a recognized village under the New Territories Small House Policy. It is one of the 37 villages represented within the Ping Shan Rural Committee. For electoral purposes, Sheung Cheung Wai is part of the Ping Shan Central constituency.

== History ==
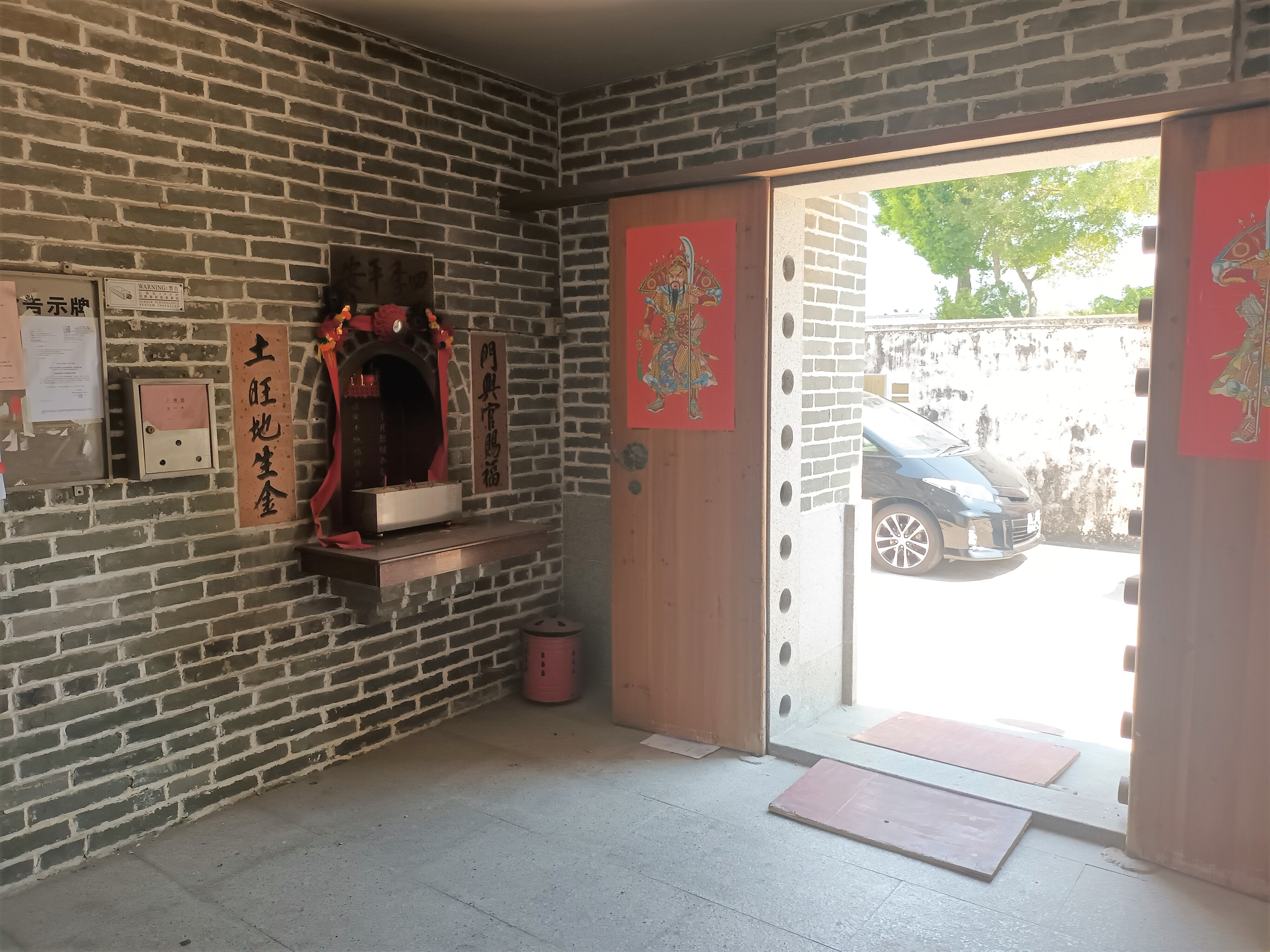
Interior of the entrance gate of Sheung Cheung Wai.

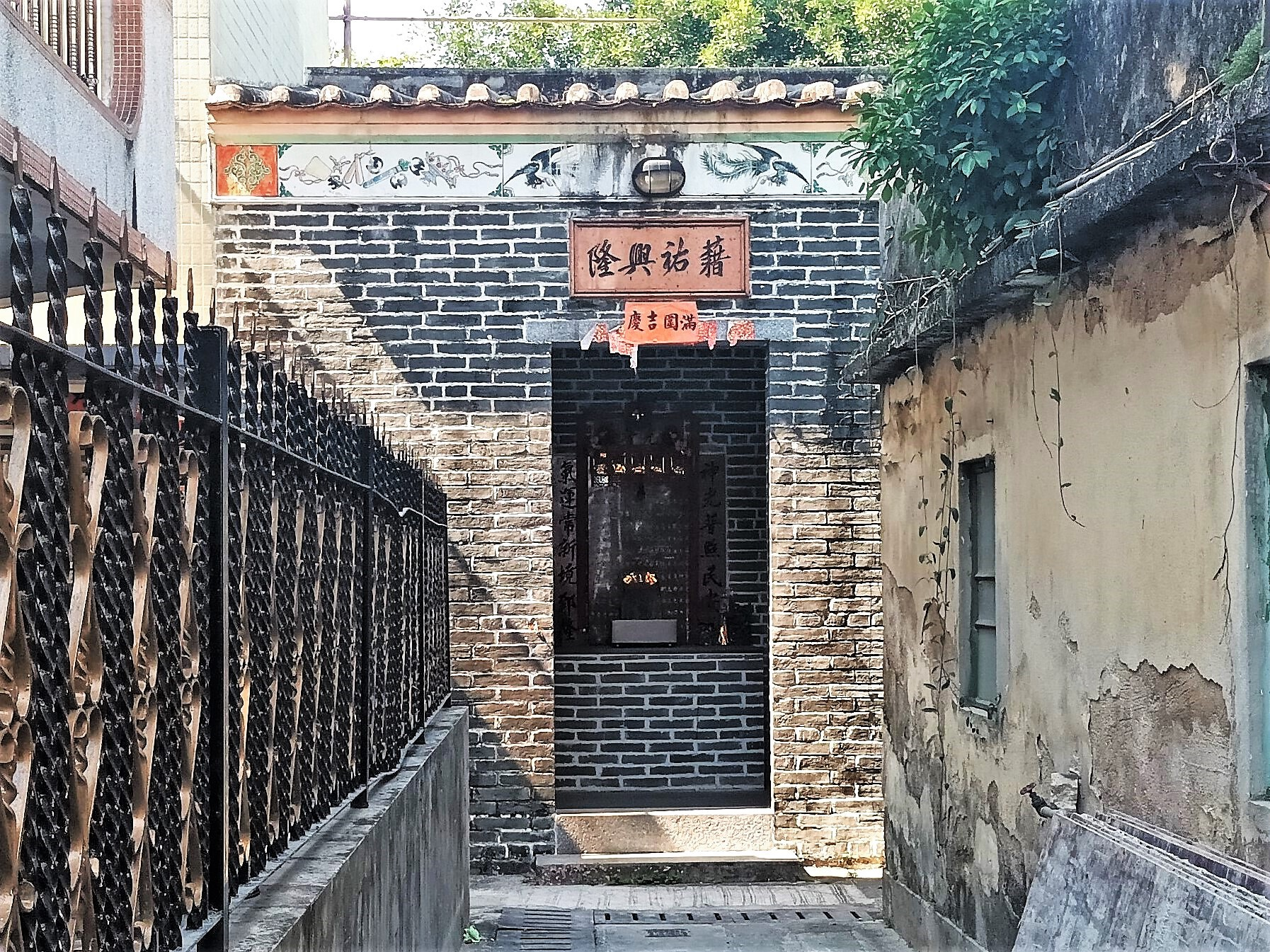
Village shrine of Sheung Cheung Wai.

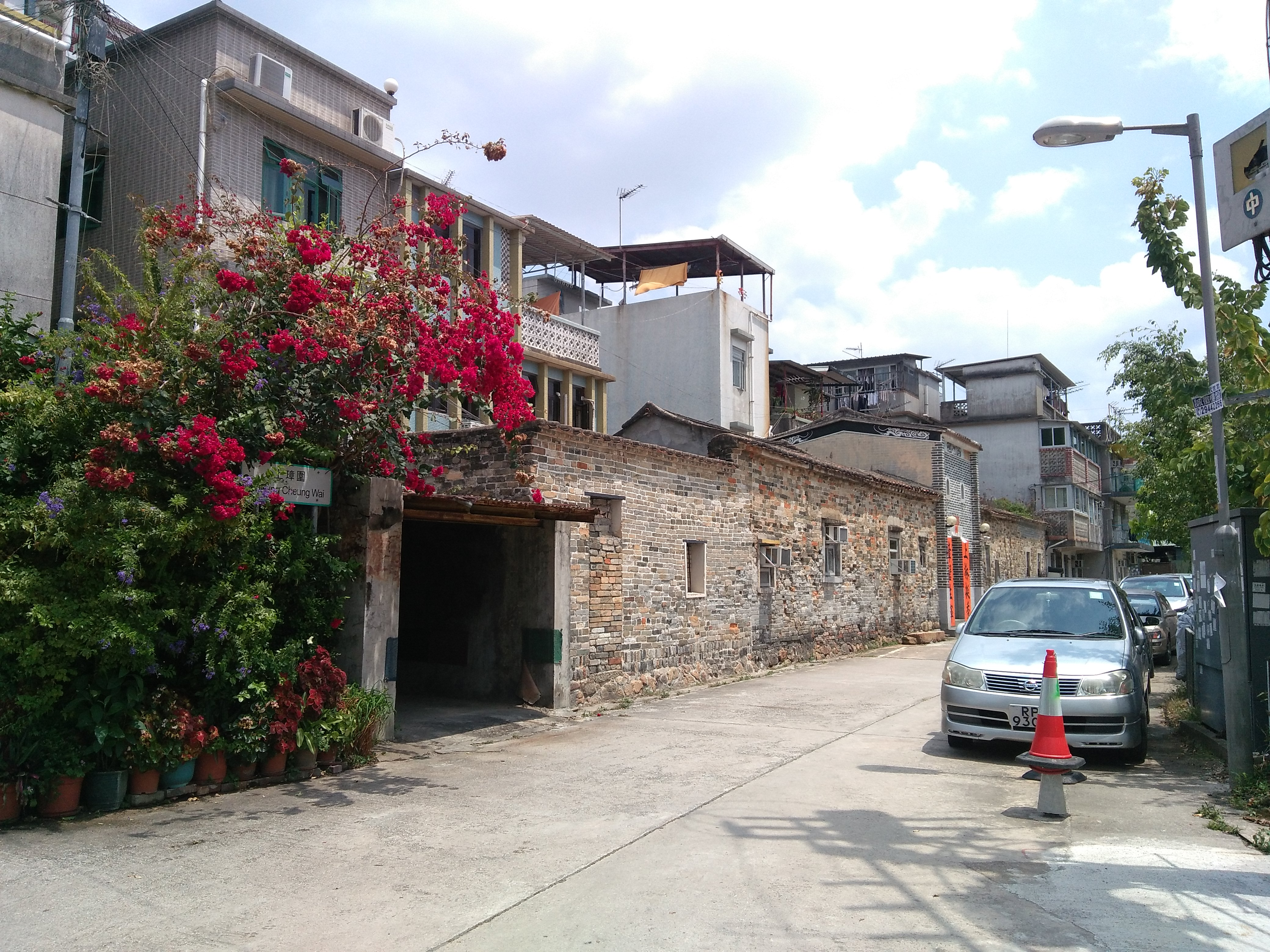
Defensive wall of Sheung Cheung Wai and remains of the lower storey of the southwest watchtower.

Sheung Cheung Wai is one of the three wais (walled villages) and six tsuens (villages) established by the Tang Clan of Ping Shan, namely: Sheung Cheung Wai, Kiu Tau Wai, Fui Sha Wai, Hang Tau Tsuen, Hang Mei Tsuen, Tong Fong Tsuen, San Tsuen, Hung Uk Tsuen and San Hei Tsuen.

It was built about 200 years ago by a line of the Tang Clan that branched out from nearby Hang Tau Tsuen.

At the time of the 1911 census, the population of Sheung Cheung Wai was 119. The number of males was 52.

== Features ==
The moat that once surrounded the village has been filled. Three of the original watchtowers have collapsed and only the lower storey of the southwest one remains, which has been converted for residential use.

== Conservation ==
Sheung Cheung Wai is the only walled village along the Ping Shan Heritage Trail.

== See also ==
- Walled villages of Hong Kong
