= Tsui Sing Lau Pagoda =

- 聚星樓
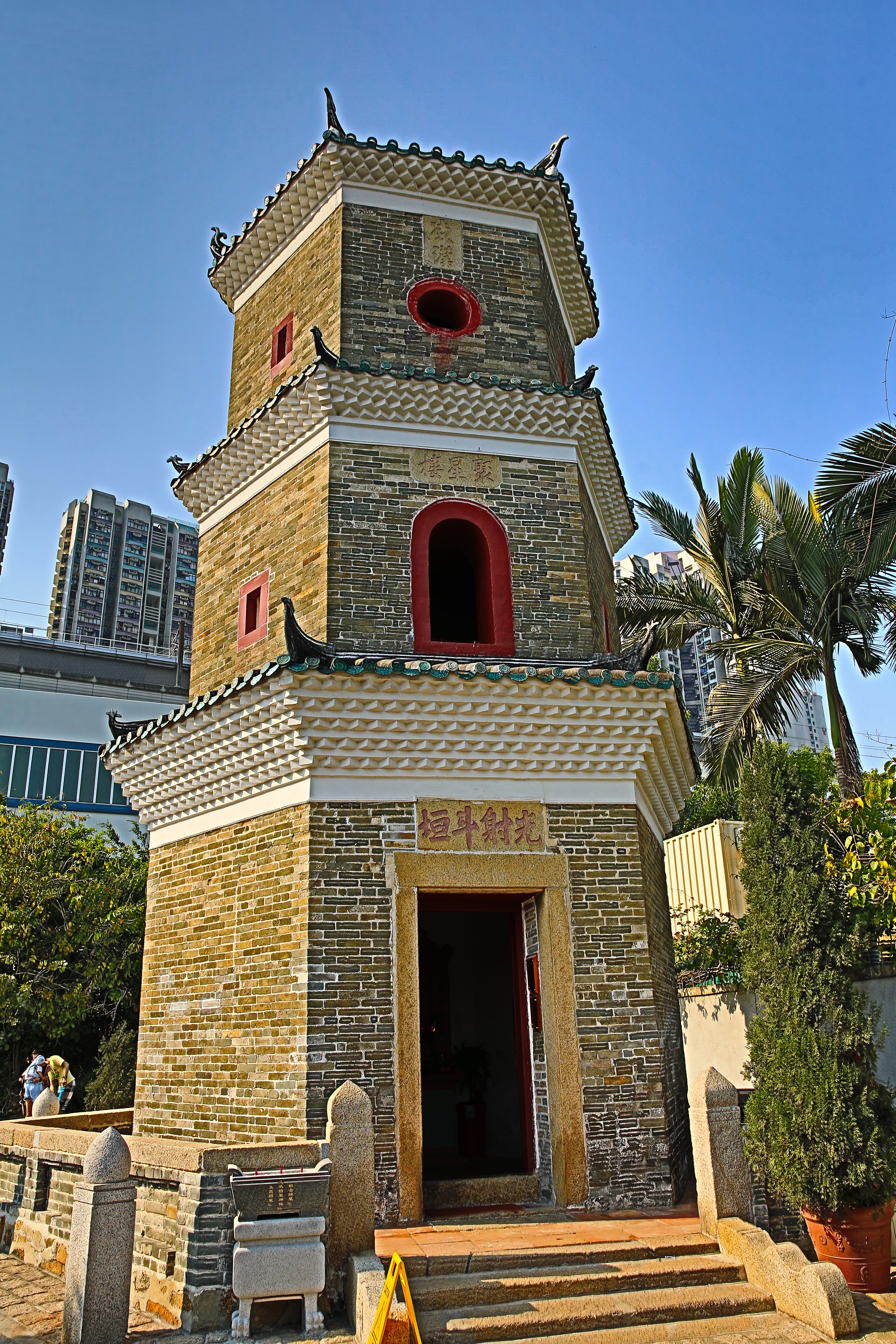
- Tsui Sing Lau Pagoda
- Alternative names: 魁星塔, 文昌閣, (local)文塔

General information
- Type: Pagoda
- Location: Ping Shan, Yuen Long, New Territories, Hong Kong
- Coordinates: 22.448767°N 114.006151°E
- Completed: 1486; 539 years ago
- Owner: Tang clan
- Height: 13 metres

Technical details
- Floor count: 3 (formerly 7)

Declared Monument of Hong Kong
- Designated: 14 December 2001; 23 years ago
- Reference no.: 75

The Tsui Sing Lau Pagoda (Chinese: 聚星樓; Jyutping: zeoi6 sing1 lau4; lit. 'The Pagoda of Gathering Stars') is the only surviving ancient pagoda in Hong Kong near MTR Tin Shui Wai station and Light Rail Tin Shui Wai stop. It is part of the Ping Shan Heritage Trail and a declared monument.

== History ==
According to Tang Clan legend, Tsui Sing Lau was originally located at the mouth of Deep Bay. It was built at least 600 years ago, by the seventh-generation ancestor, Tang Yin-tung, to avoid evil spirits from the north, prevent floods and help the Tangs win a title in the imperial examination. Numerous Tangs have been granted titles. It was declared a monument on 14 December 2001.

A further Tang legend relates how in 1382, Tang Yin-tung dreamed that a group of stars all gathered together and dropped onto the place where the pagoda now stands. Tang was reminded of the words of a fung shui master who had complimented the good fung shui of Ping Shan, but who also gave two comments on its geographical weaknesses. The Tangs had not fully comprehended the second comment, so Tang Yin-tung immediately consulted a Fung Shui master. The master advised him to build a Buddhist pagoda on that spot in order to gather the 'scholarship' for the clan, hence the name. After the building of the pagoda, the Tang clan produced numerous scholars and officials in the Ming and Qing dynasties.

Built on a low foundation, the hexagonal pagoda is believed to have had an initial total of seven floors, but this was reduced to three due to erosion. It is made of mud bricks and granite. Fui Shing is worshipped on the top floor, where the words Over the Milky Way were inscribed. Fui Shing was a god who determined which scholars were to pass examinations and receive titles. The words The Pagoda of Gathering Stars and Light Shines Straight Onto the Dippers and the Enclosures were inscribed on the second and ground floors respectively.

== See also ==
- Ping Shan
- Architecture of Hong Kong
