= Hang Mei Tsuen =

Village in Hong Kong

Coordinates: 22.444451°N 114.0081°E

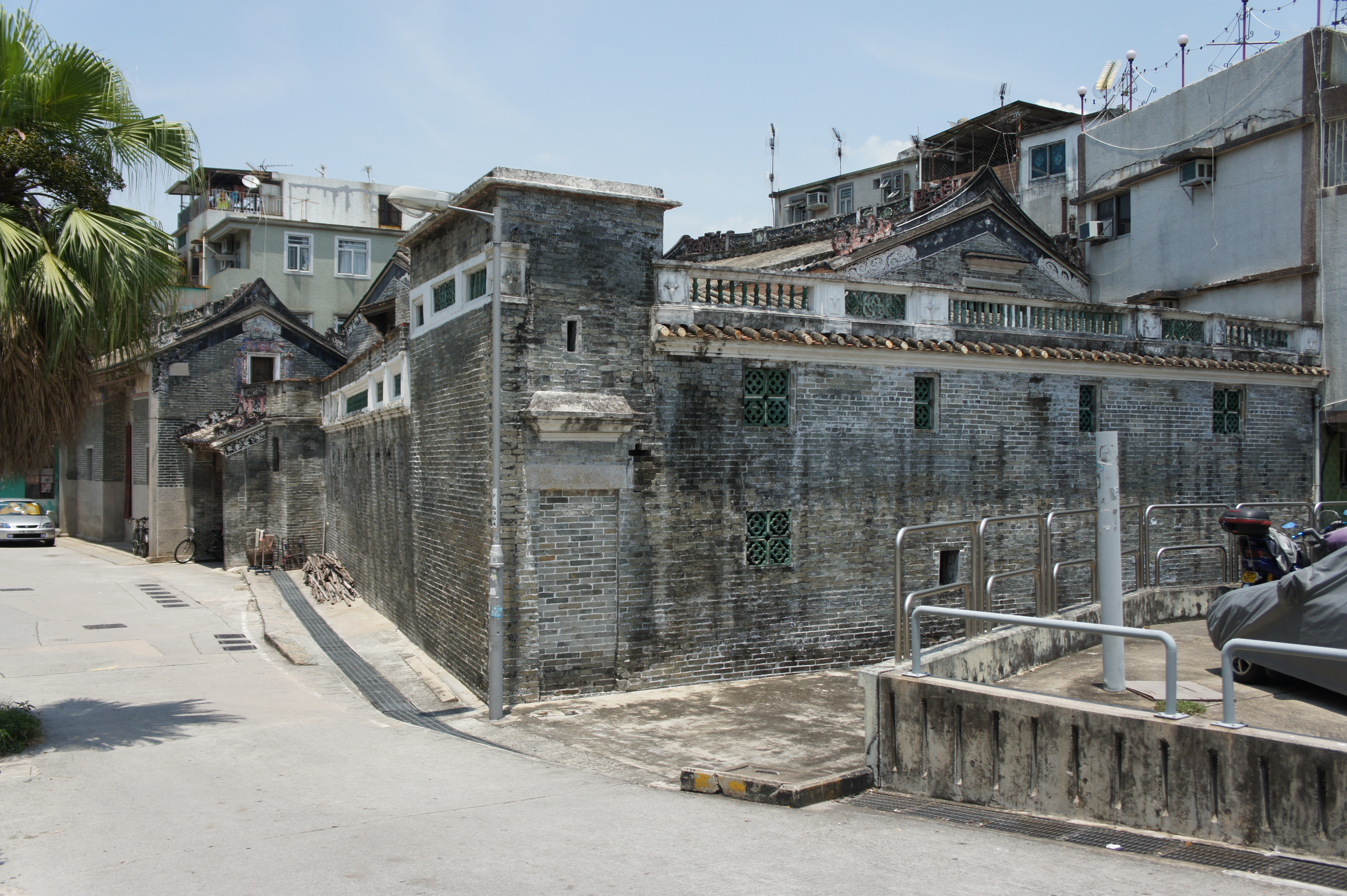
Ching Shu Hin, a former guest house in Hang Mei Tsuen.

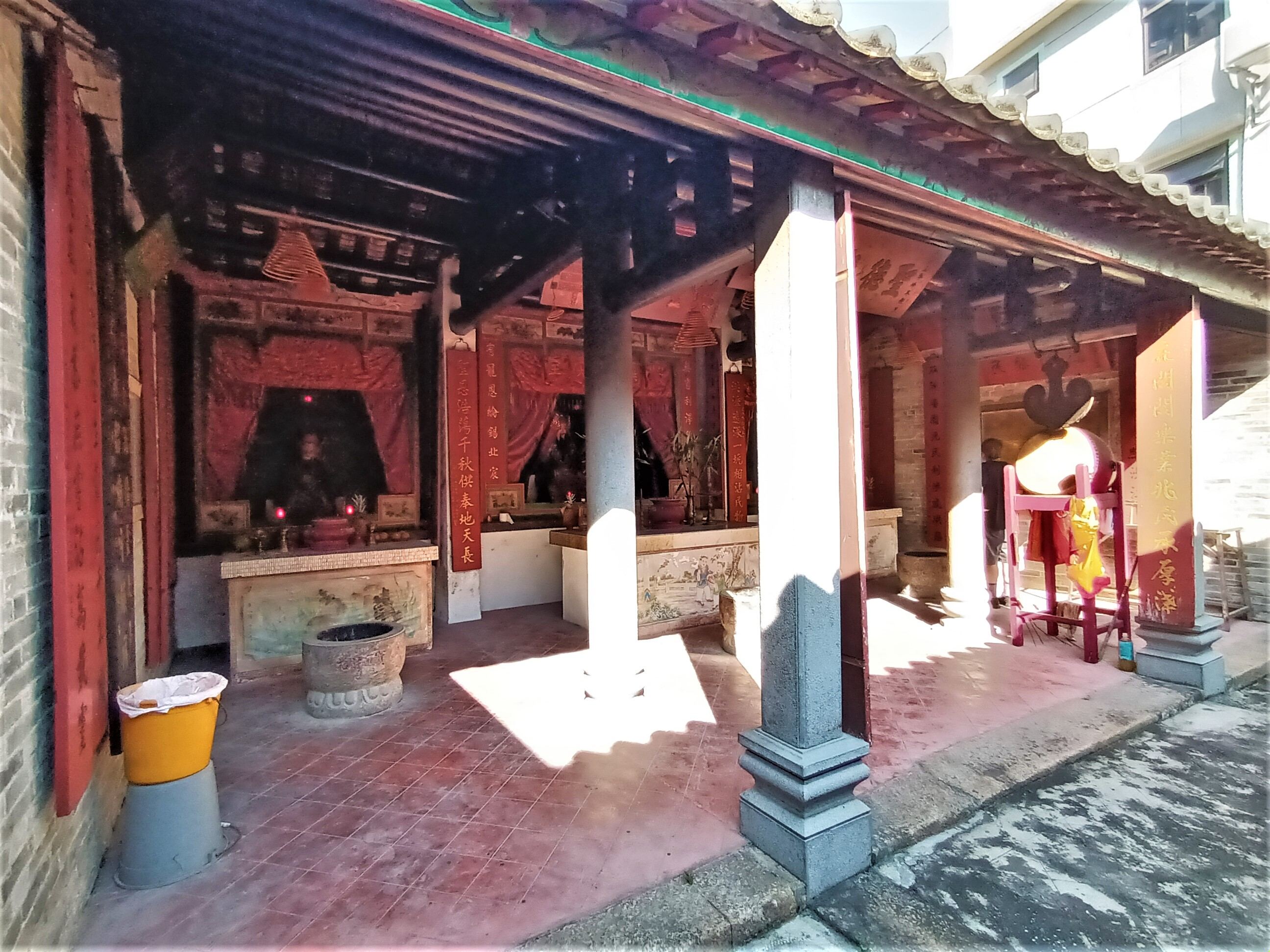
Hung Shing Temple in Hang Mei Tsuen.

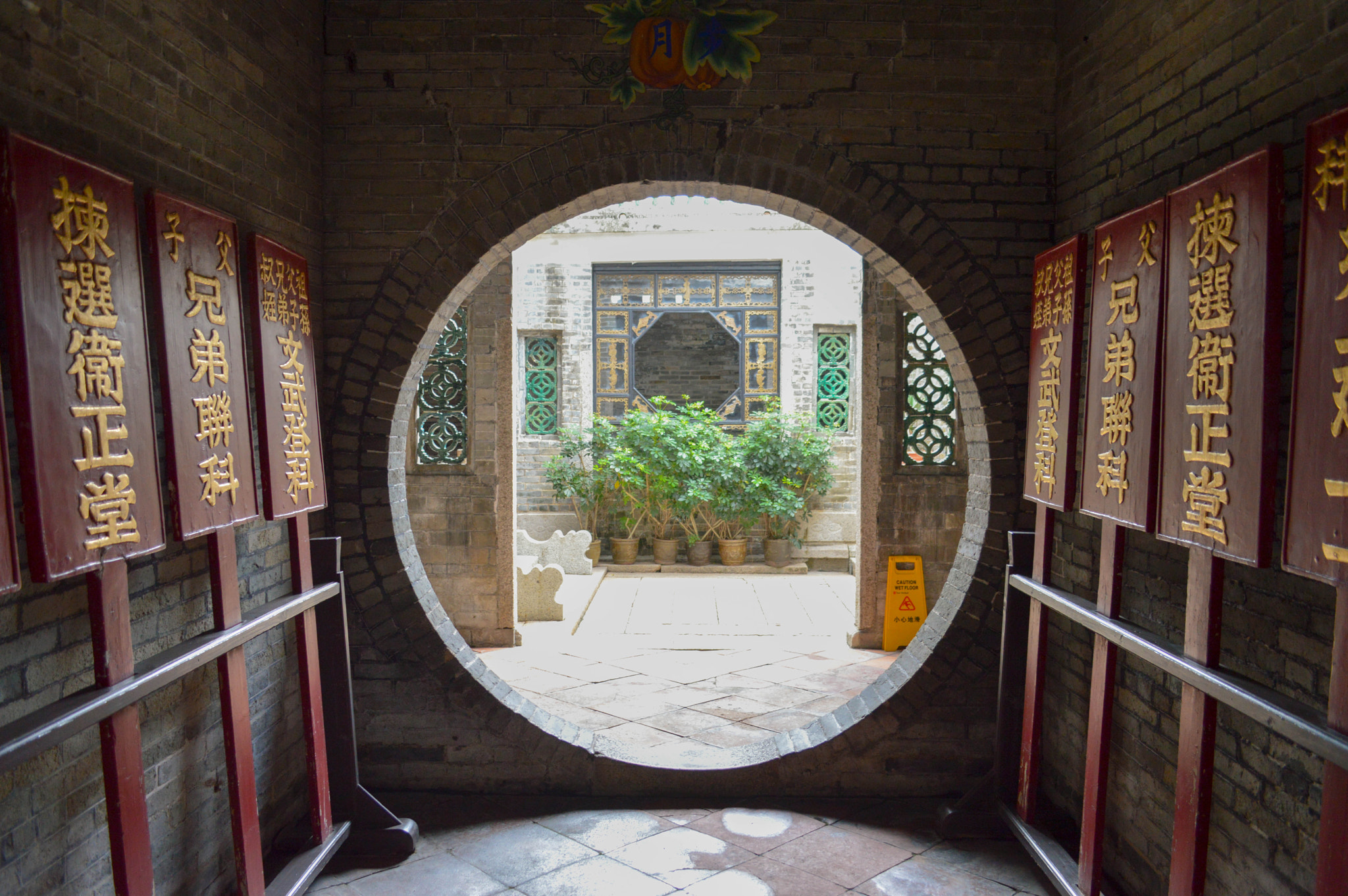
Moon gate within Kun Ting Study Hall, in Hang Mei Tsuen.

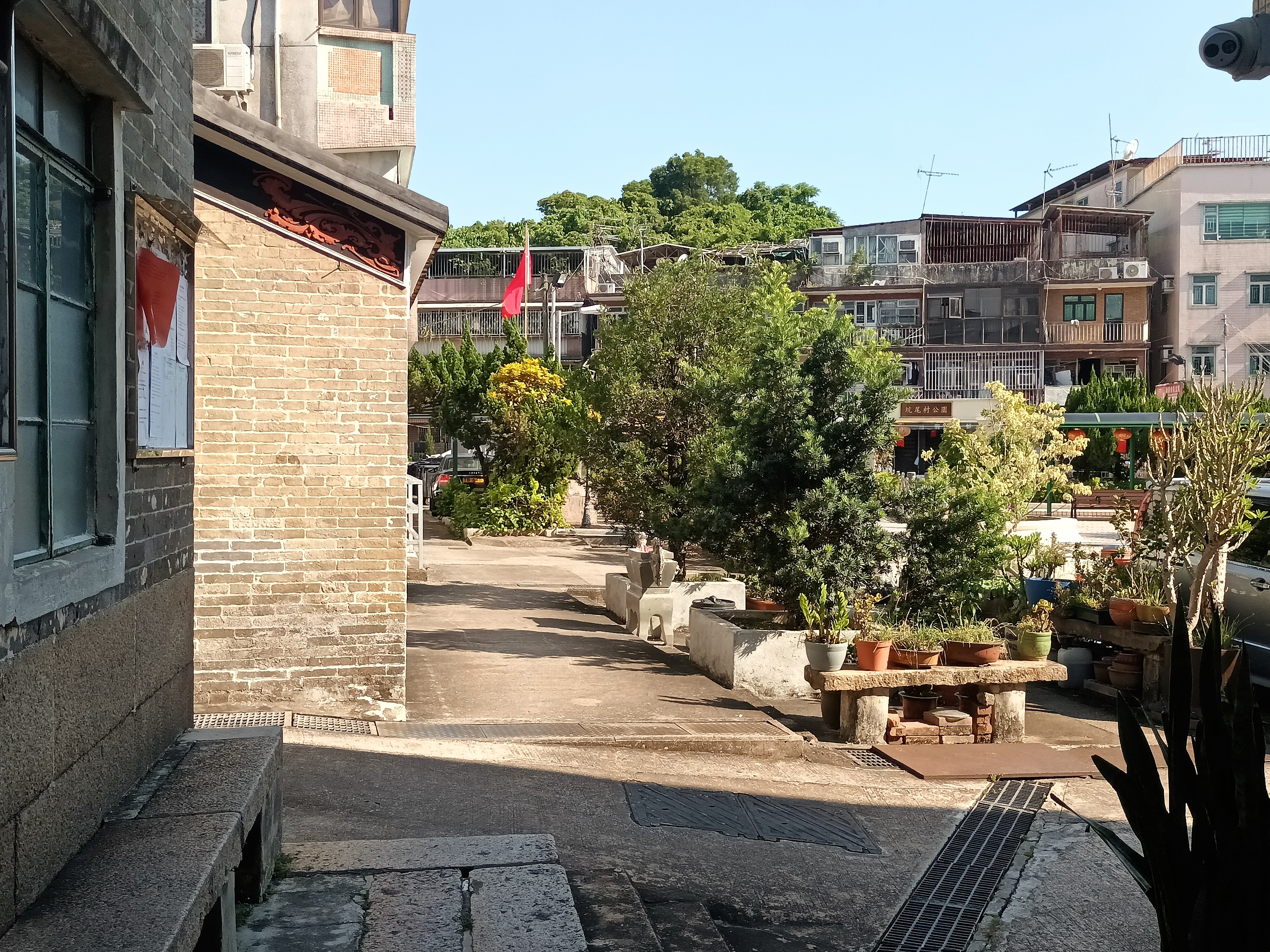
Hang Mei Tsuen Park.

Hang Mei Tsuen (Chinese: 坑尾村) is a village in the Ping Shan area of Yuen Long District, in Hong Kong. It is part of the Ping Shan Heritage Trail.

== Administration ==
Hang Mei Tsuen is a recognized village under the New Territories Small House Policy.

== History ==
Hang Tau Tsuen is one of the three wais (walled villages) and six tsuens (villages) established by the Tang Clan of Ping Shan, namely: Sheung Cheung Wai, Kiu Tau Wai, Fui Sha Wai, Hang Tau Tsuen, Hang Mei Tsuen, Tong Fong Tsuen, San Tsuen, Hung Uk Tsuen and San Hei Tsuen.

== See also ==
- Walled villages of Hong Kong
- Hang Mei Tsuen stop
