= Kiu Tau Wai =

Walled village in Hong Kong

Coordinates: 22.443011°N 114.004257°E

Kiu Tau Wai Chinese: 橋頭圍
- Village
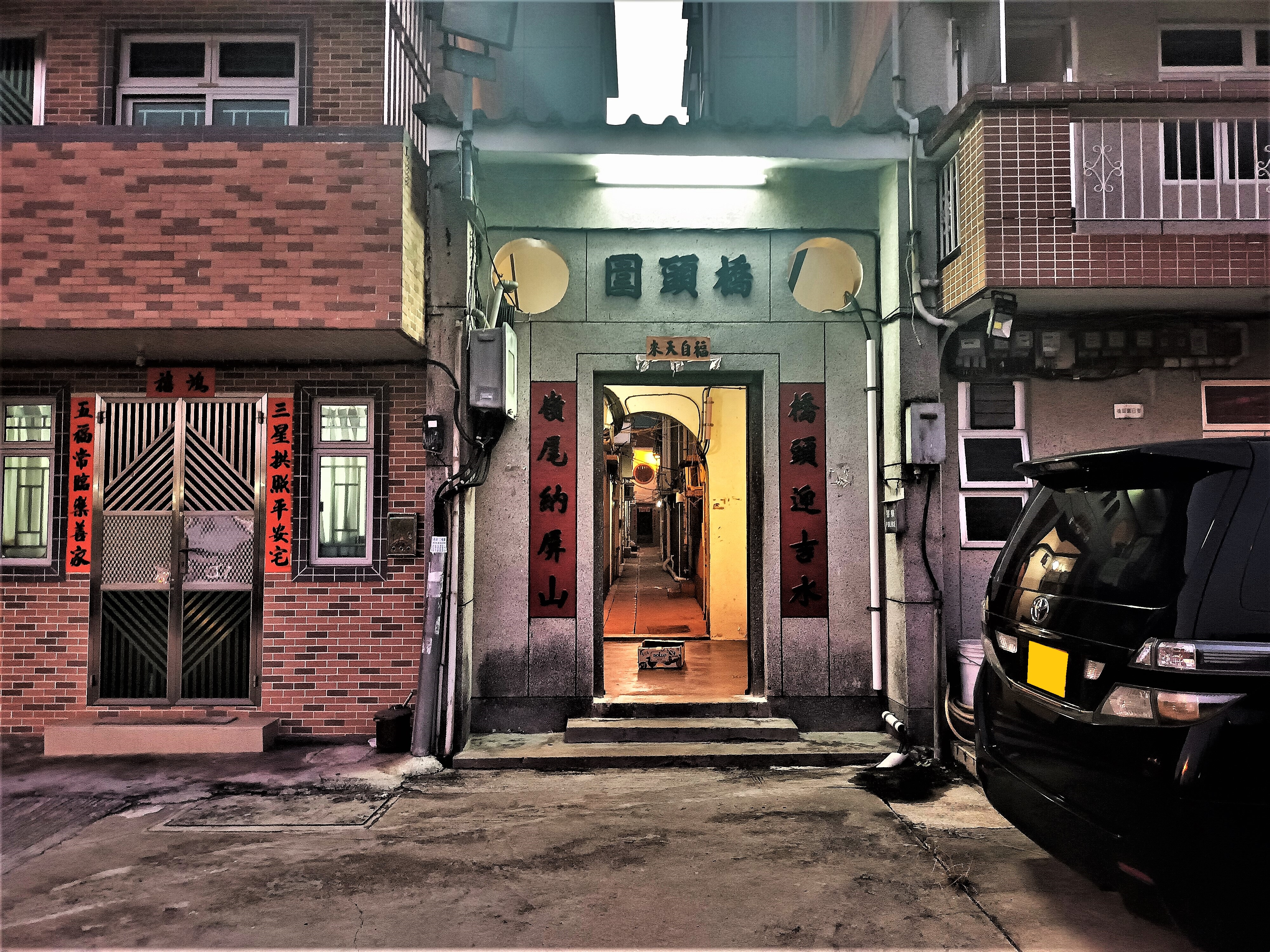
- Entrance gate of Kiu Tau Wai

- Location within Hong Kong
- Country: People's Republic of China
- Special administrative region: Hong Kong
- District: Yuen Long District
- Area: Ping Shan
- Time zone: UTC+8:00 (HKT)

Kiu Tau Wai (Chinese: 橋頭圍) is a walled village in Ping Shan, Yuen Long District, Hong Kong.

== Administration ==
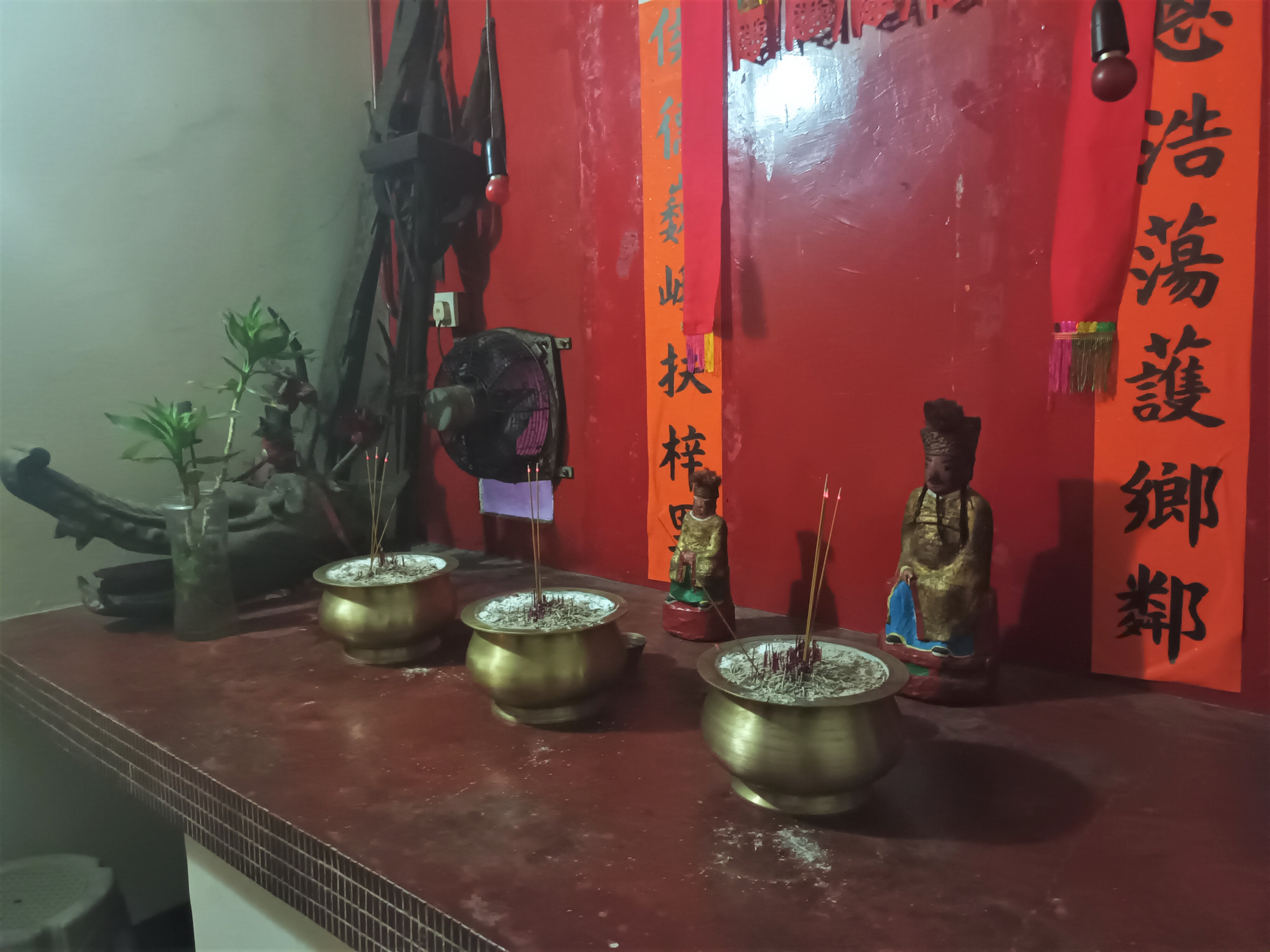
Altar of the village shrine of Kiu Tau Wai.

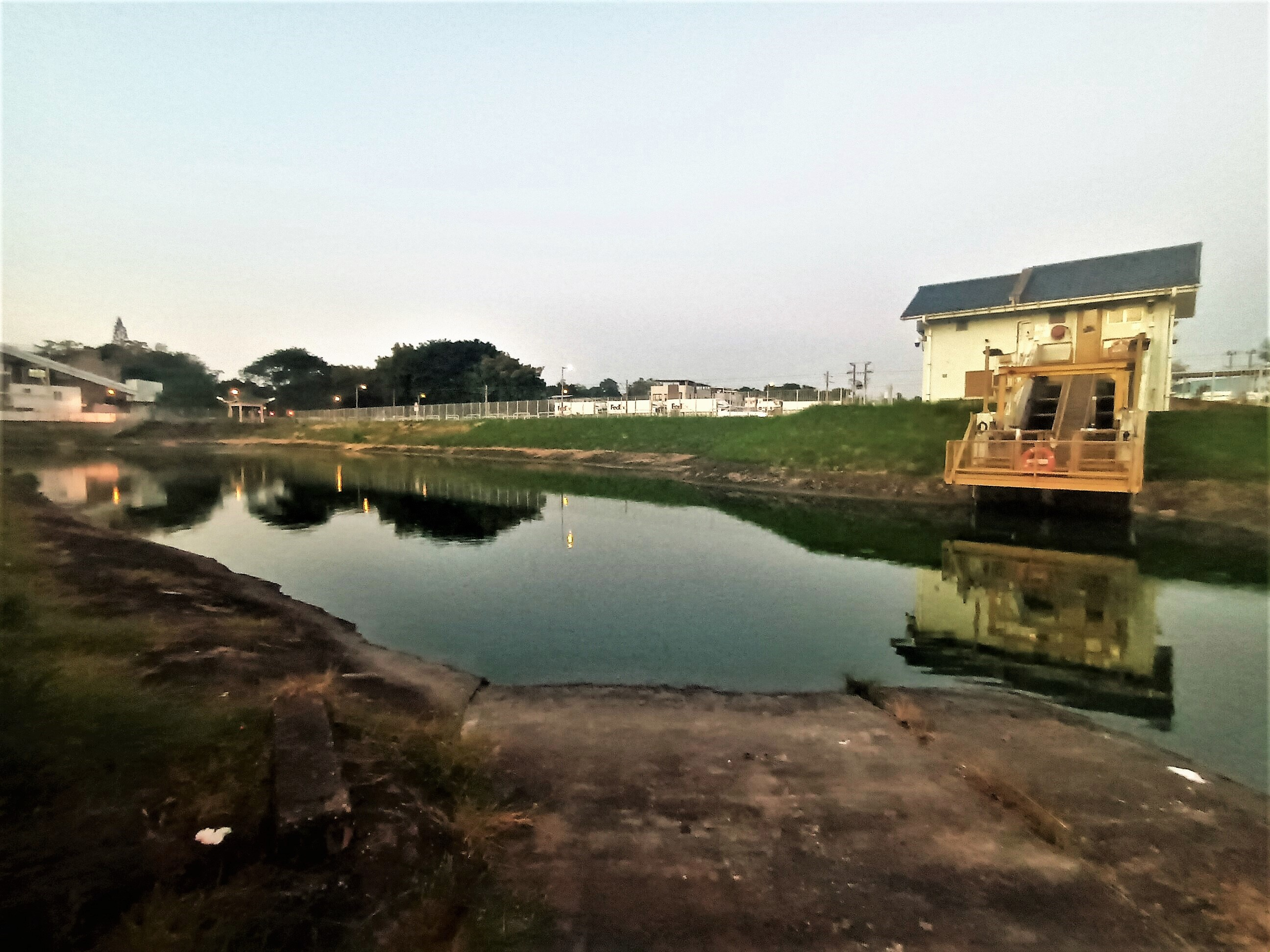
Pond of Kiu Tau Wai.

Kiu Tau Wai is a recognized village under the New Territories Small House Policy. It is one of the 37 villages represented within the Ping Shan Rural Committee.

== History ==
Kiu Tau Wai is one of the three wais (walled villages) and six tsuens (villages) established by the Tang Clan of Ping Shan, namely: Sheung Cheung Wai, Kiu Tau Wai, Fui Sha Wai, Hang Tau Tsuen, Hang Mei Tsuen, Tong Fong Tsuen, San Tsuen, Hung Uk Tsuen, and San Hei Tsuen.

At the time of the 1911 census, the population of Kiu Tau Wai was 152. The number of males was 71.

== See also ==
- Walled villages of Hong Kong
- Ping Shan Heritage Trail
