= Fui Sha Wai (Yuen Long District) =

Walled village in Hong Kong

Fui Sha Wai Chinese: 灰沙圍
- Village
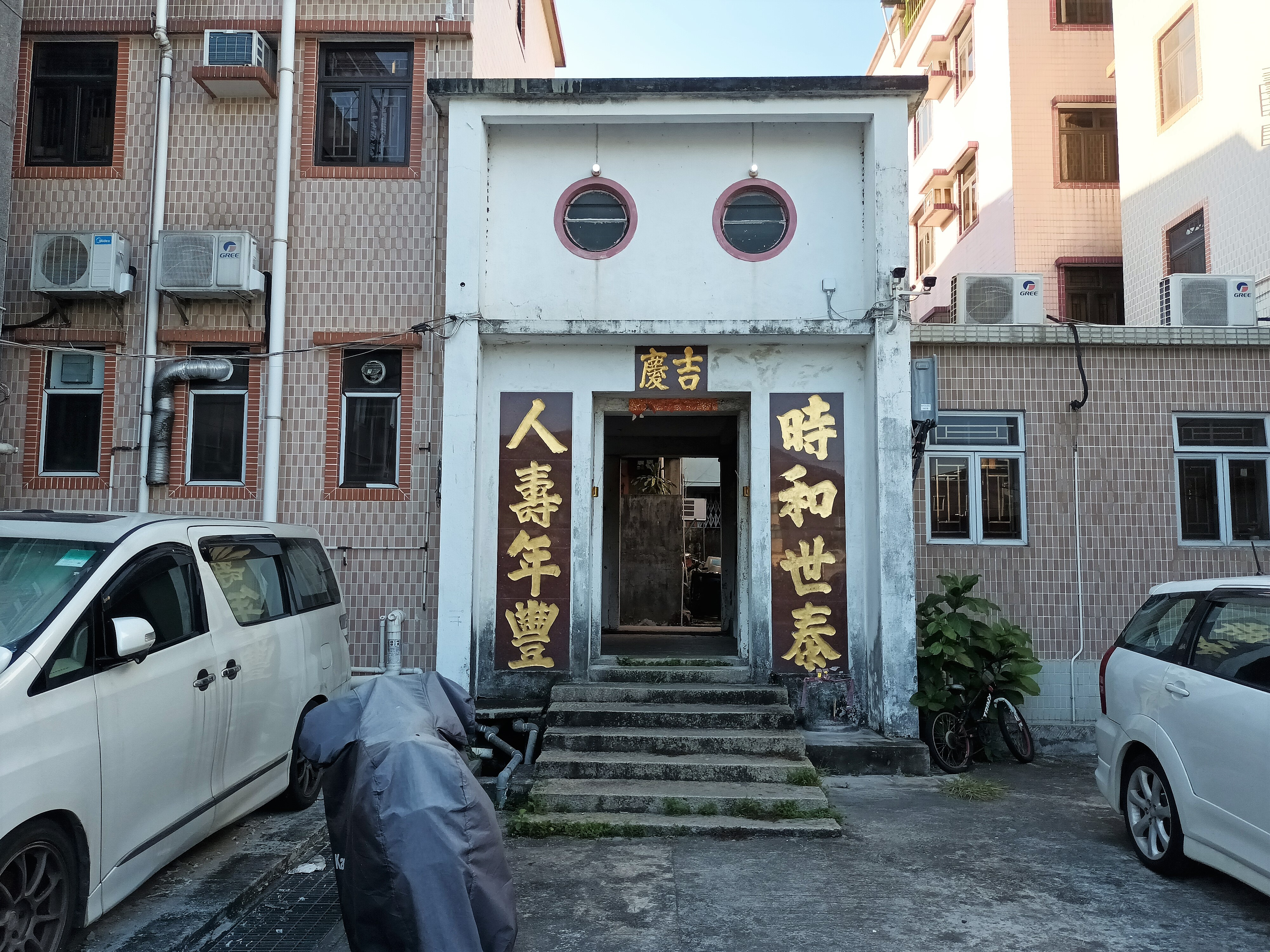
- Entrance gate of Fui Sha Wai

- Location within Hong Kong
- Coordinates: 22.438439°N 114.006388°E
- Country: People's Republic of China
- Special administrative region: Hong Kong
- District: Yuen Long District
- Area: Ping Shan
- Time zone: UTC+8:00 (HKT)

Fui Sha Wai (Chinese: 灰沙圍) is a walled village in Ping Shan, Yuen Long District, Hong Kong.

== Administration ==
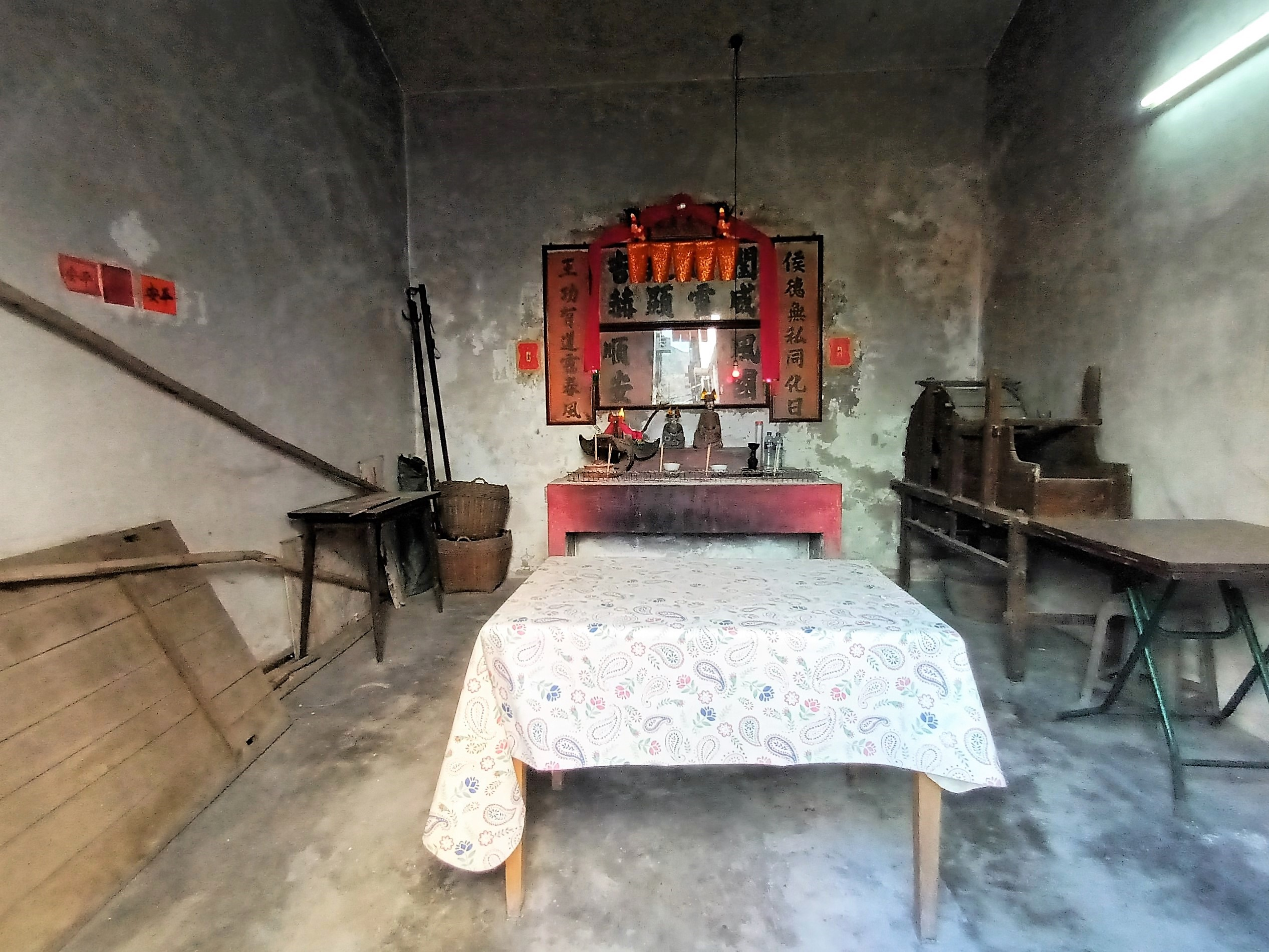
Interior of the village shrine of Fui Sha Wai.

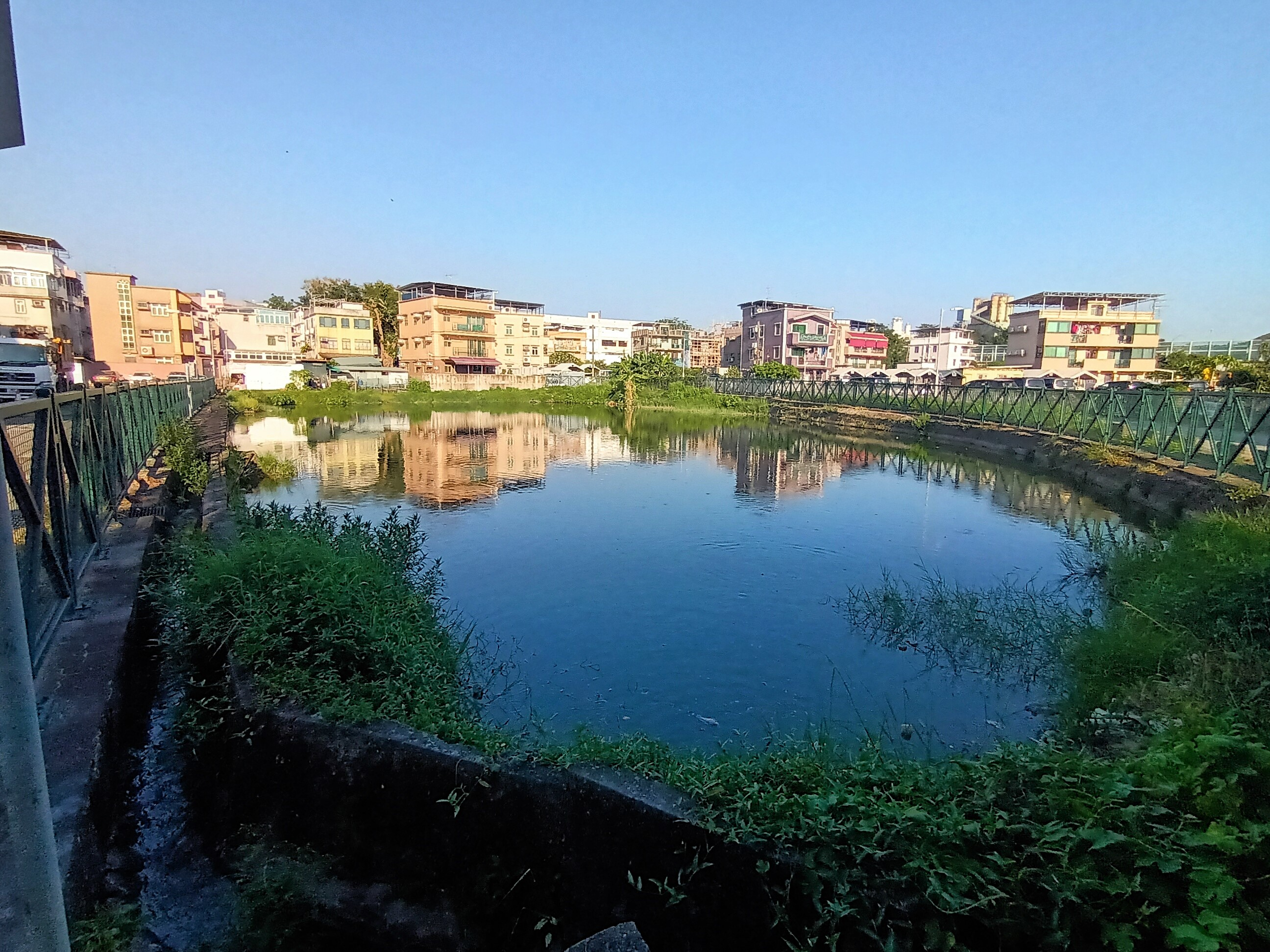
Pond of Fui Sha Wai.

Fui Sha Wai is a recognized village under the New Territories Small House Policy. It is one of the 37 villages represented within the Ping Shan Rural Committee.

== History ==
Fui Sha Wai is one of the three wais (walled villages) and six tsuens (villages) established by the Tang Clan of Ping Shan, namely: Sheung Cheung Wai, Kiu Tau Wai, Fui Sha Wai, Hang Tau Tsuen, Hang Mei Tsuen, Tong Fong Tsuen, San Tsuen, Hung Uk Tsuen and San Hei Tsuen.

At the time of the 1911 census, the population of Fui Sha Wai was 165. The number of males was 72.

== See also ==
- Walled villages of Hong Kong
- Ping Shan Heritage Trail
