= Ping Shan Heritage Trail =

Heritage Trail in Ping Shan, Hong Kong

Coordinates: 22.4449°N 114.0073°E

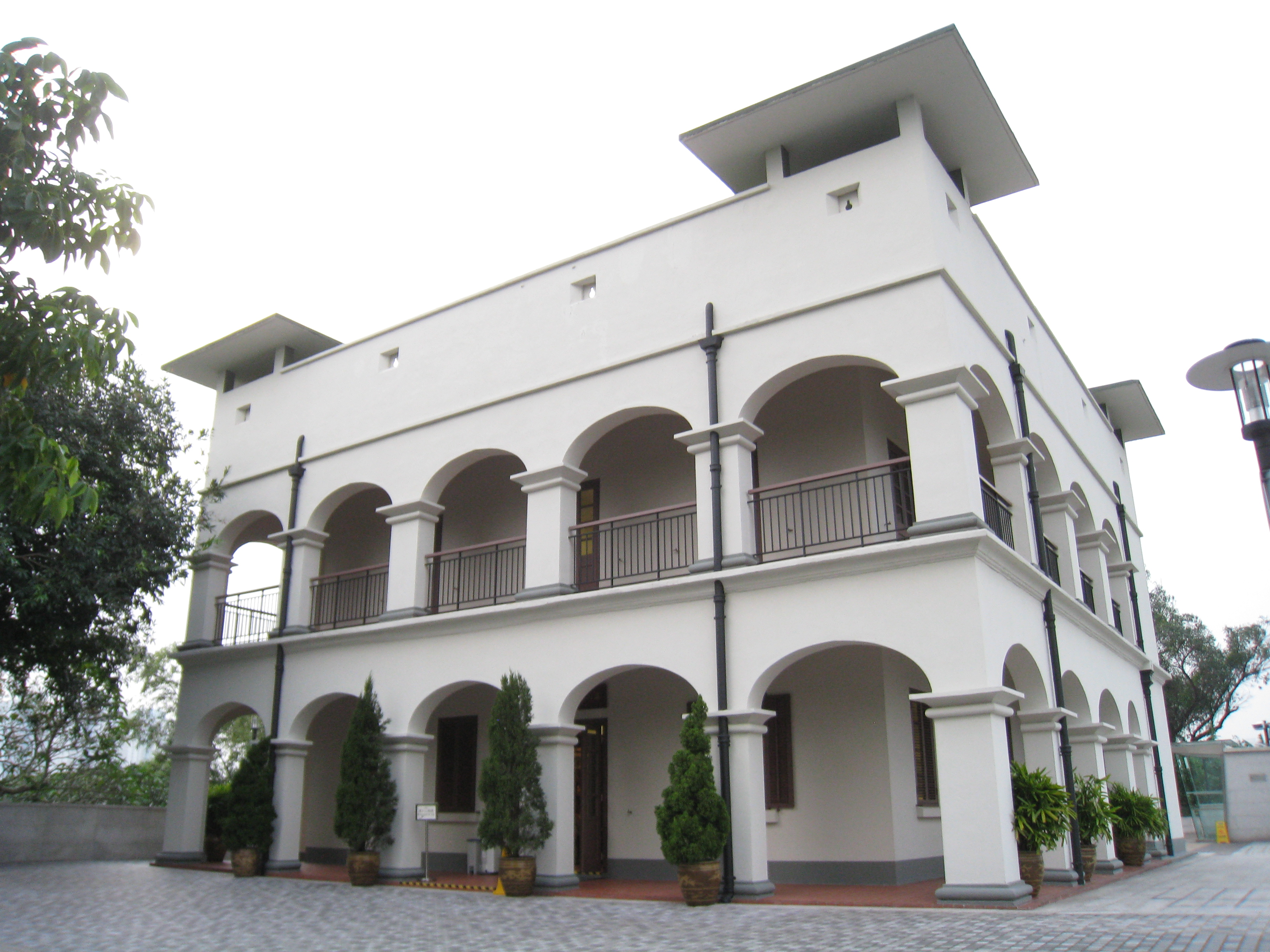
- Ping Shan Tang Clan Gallery cum Heritage Trail Visitors Centre
- Traditional Chinese: 屏山文物徑
Transcriptions
Yue: Cantonese
- Yale Romanization: Pìhng sāan màhn maht ging
- Jyutping: Ping4 saan1 man4 mat6 ging3

Ping Shan Heritage Trail is a heritage trail located in the Ping Shan area of Yuen Long District, in Hong Kong. The trail was opened on 12 December 1993. It passes through the villages of Hang Tau Tsuen, Hang Mei Tsuen and Sheung Cheung Wai and it includes several declared monuments and graded buildings.

The Ping Shan Tang Clan Gallery and Heritage Trail Visitors Centre was opened in 2007. It is housed in the Old Ping Shan Police Station.

== Sights ==
The trail has 14 historic buildings. The Ping Shan Tang Clan Gallery cum Heritage Trail Visitors Centre was opened in 2007. It is housed in the Old Ping Shan Police Station.

=== Graded historic buildings ===
The trails' Grade I historic building consists of Shut Hing Study Hall, built in 1874 by the Tang Clan to commemorate the ancestor, Tang Shut-hing, located in Tong Fong Tsuen (the rear hall was demolished in 1977); the Kun Ting Study Hall, built for students preparing for the imperial civil service examination; and the Ching Shu Hin, an L-shaped two-storey building adjoining Kun Ting Study Hall. It was constructed shortly after the completion of the Study Hall in 1870 and was used as a guest house.

The Hung Shing Temple was constructed by the Tang Clan residing in Ping Shan. It was probably built in 1767 during the Qianlong reign of the Qing dynasty. The existing structure was rebuilt in 1866, followed by a substantial renovation in 1963. It is a Grade II historic building. The Yeung Hau Temple, located in Hang Tau Tsuen, is one of the six temples in Yuen Long dedicated to Hau Wong. It is a Grade III historic building.

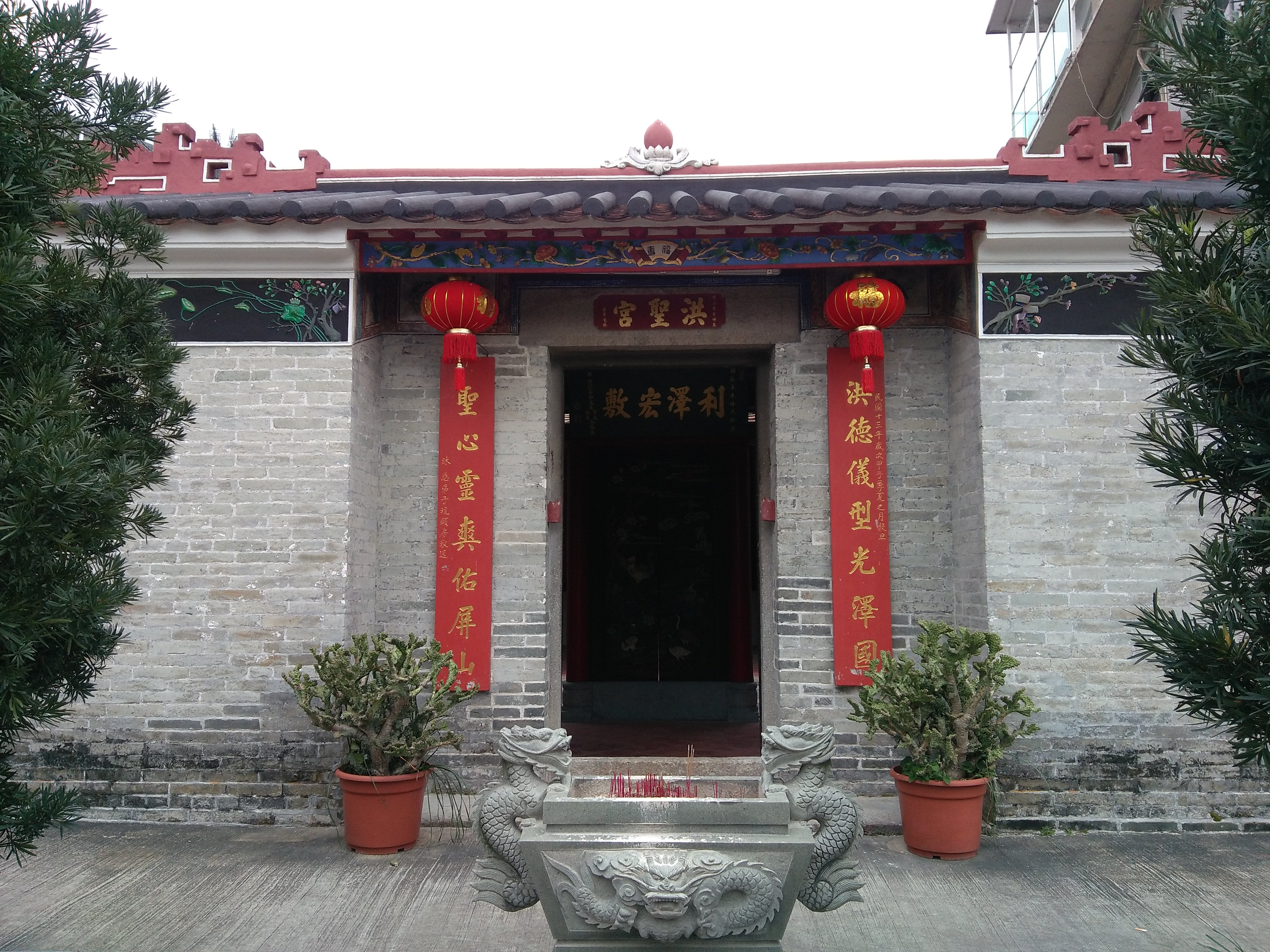
Hung Shing Temple

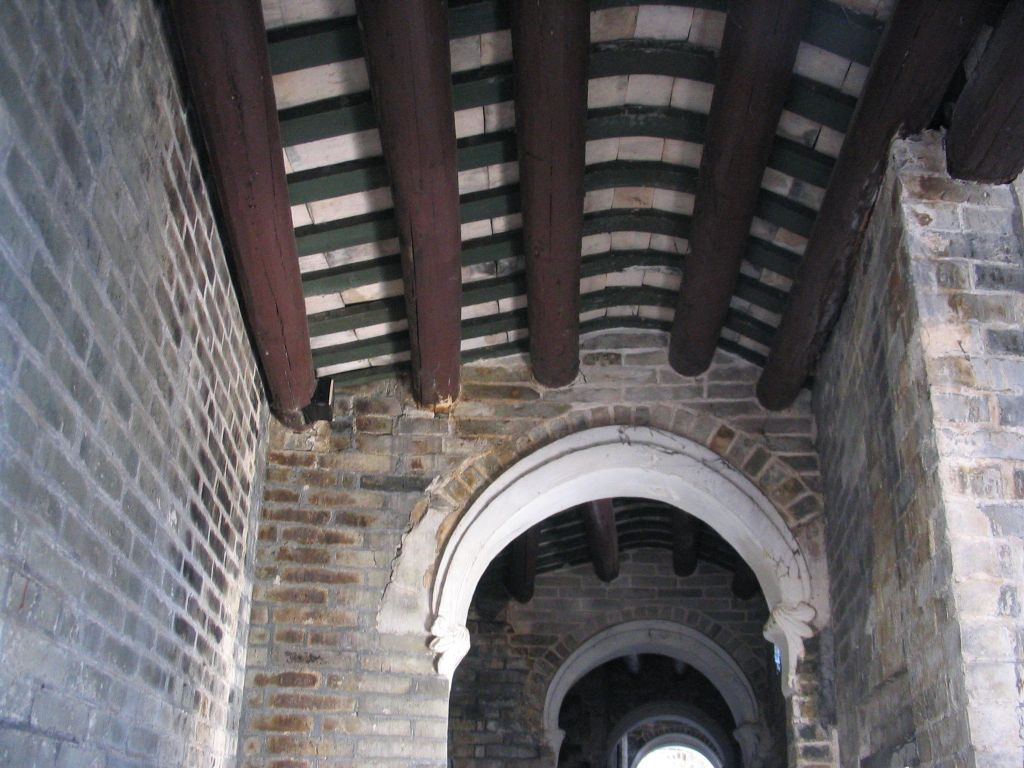
Kun Ting Study Hall

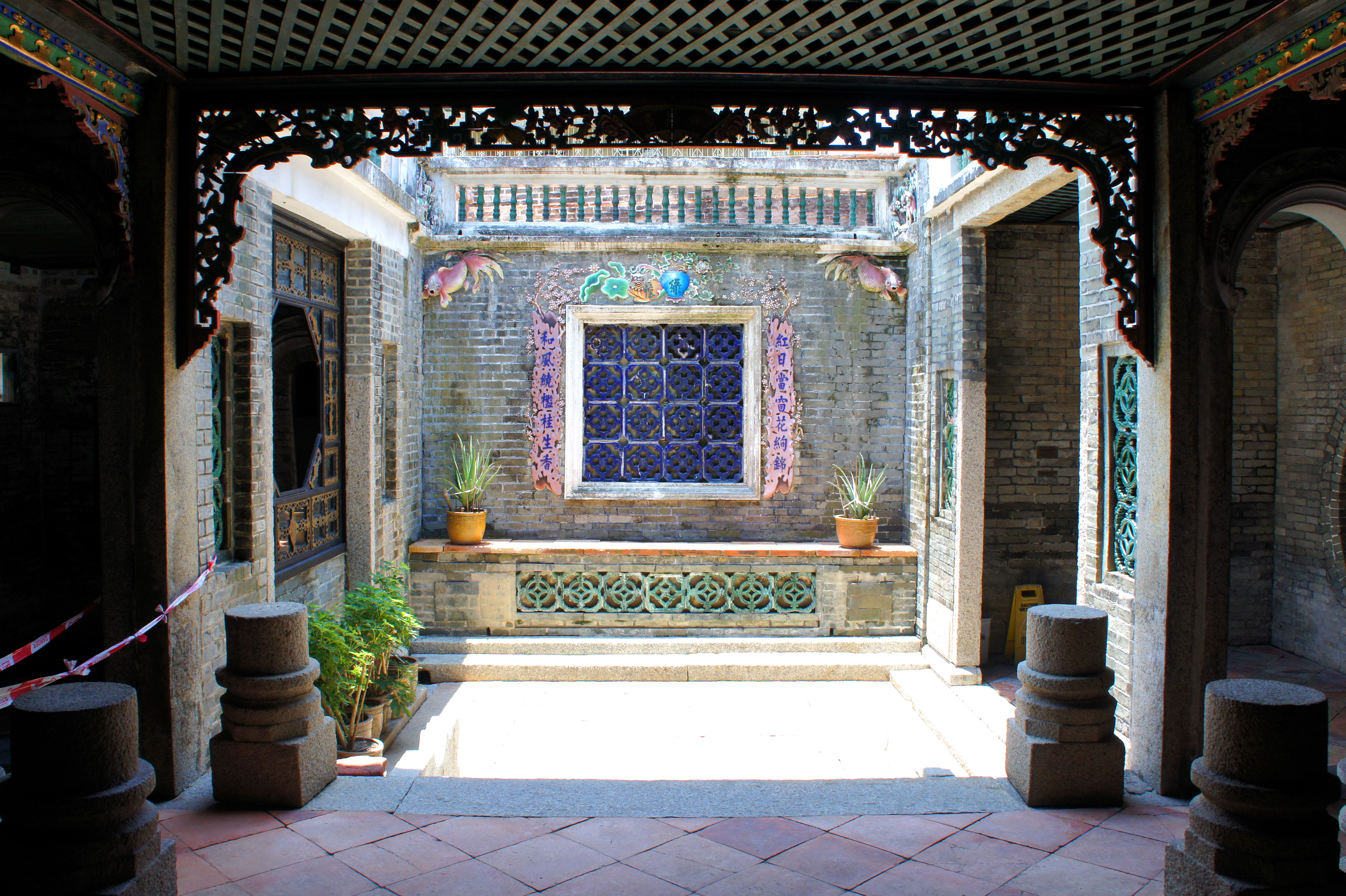
Ching Shu Hin

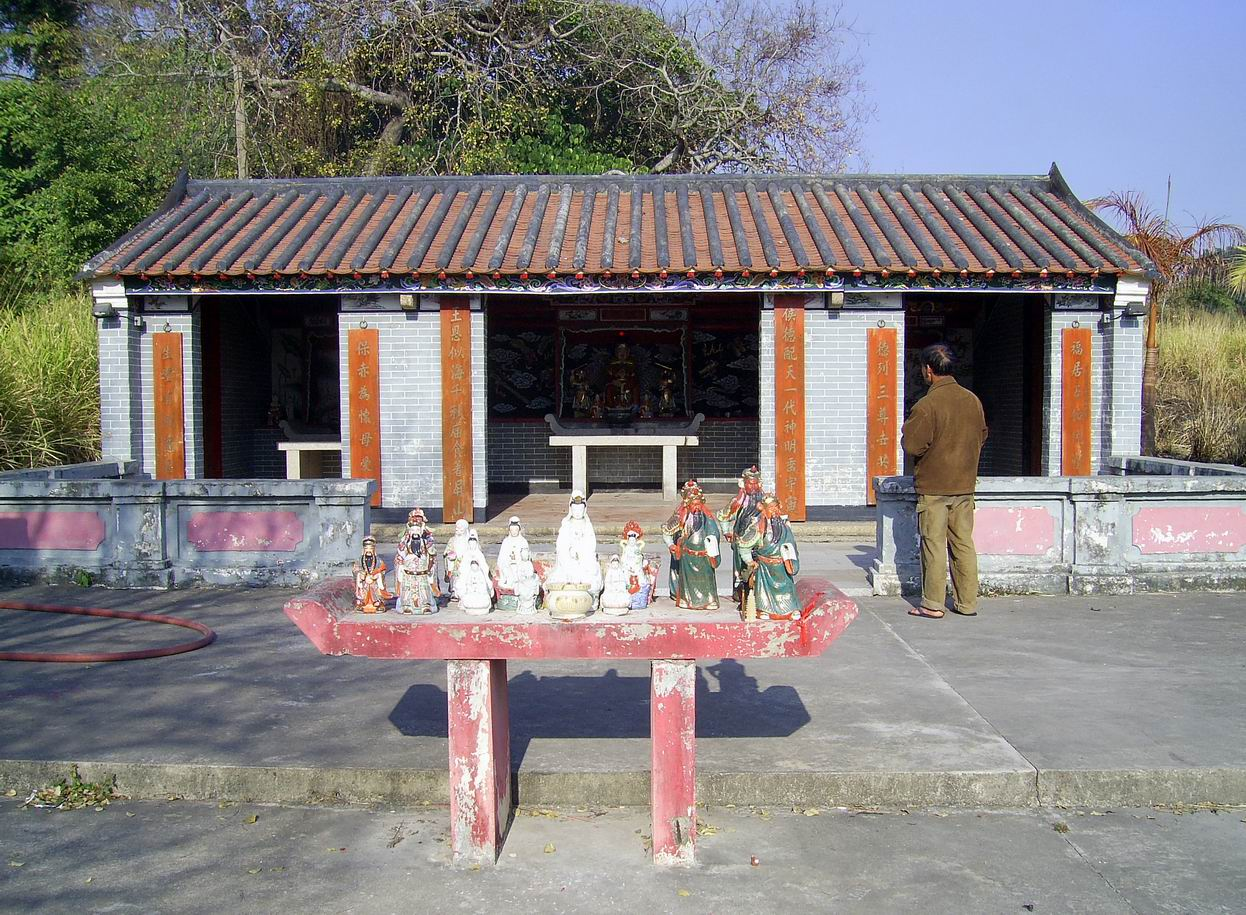
Yeung Hau Temple

=== Ancestral halls ===
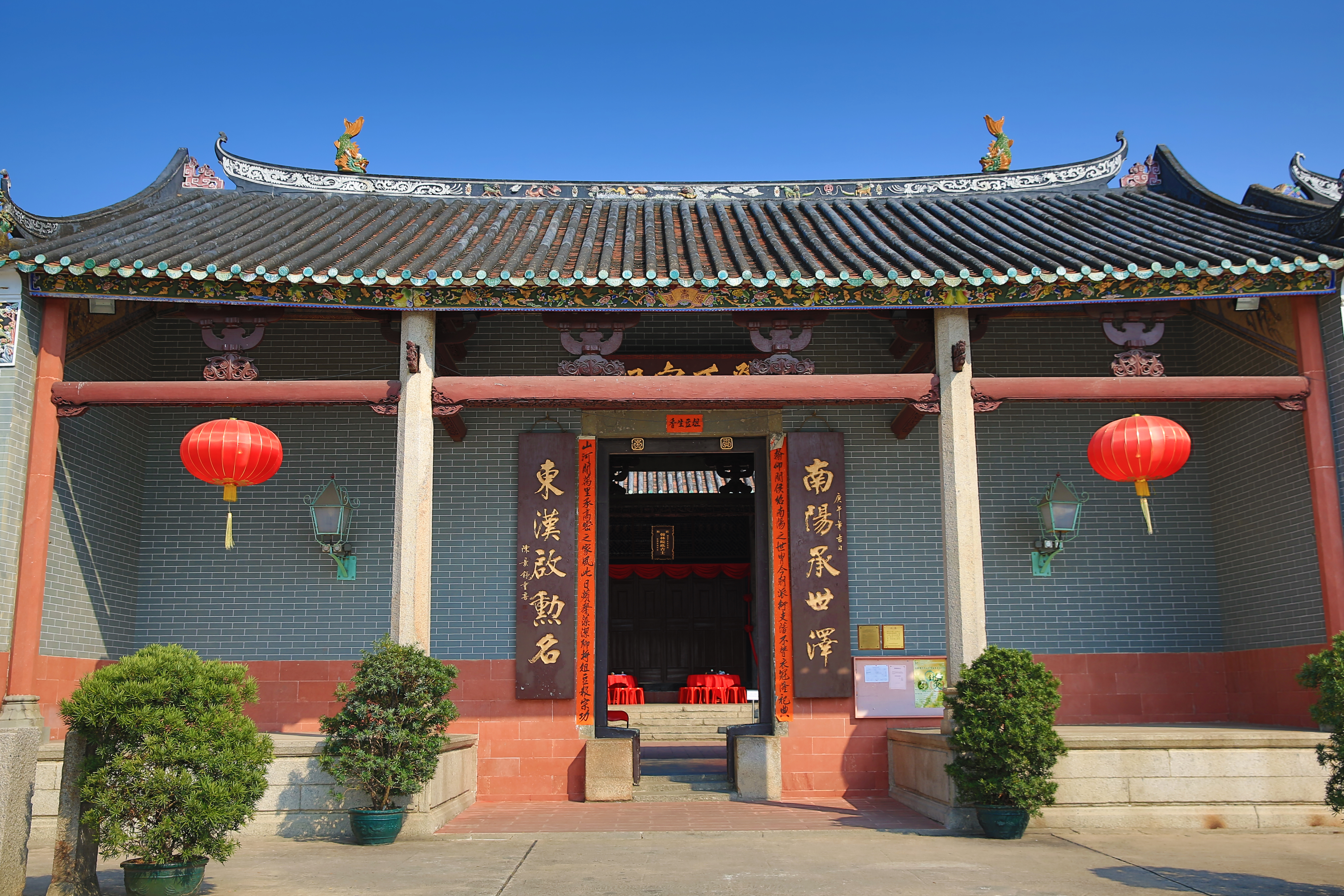
Tang Ancestral Hall

The Tang Ancestral Hall (屏山鄧氏宗祠) is one of the largest ancestral halls in the territory. It is located between Hang Mei Tsuen and Hang Tau Tsuen. It was constructed by Tang Fung-shun, the fifth generation ancestor of Tang Clan, about 700 years ago. It is a three-hall structure with two internal courtyards. The wooden brackets and beams of the three halls are carved with Chinese motifs. Shiwan dragonfish and pottery unicorns decorate the main ridges and roofs. There are ancestral tablets at the altar in the rear hall. This hall is used regularly for worship and celebrations of traditional festivals and ceremonies.

Yu Kiu Ancestral Hall is situated adjacent to Tang Ancestral Hall. Both were declared monuments on 14 December 2001. There are three halls and two internal courtyards in the compound. It was built in the early 16th century by two eleventh generation brothers of the Tang clan of Ping Shan: Tang Sai-yin (alias Yu-sing) and Tang Sai-chiu (alias Kiu-lum). The building was occupied by a primary school from 1931 to 1961. During the Guangxu reign (1875–1908) of the Qing dynasty, the last major renovation of the building probably took place; it was indicated by the engraved characters on the stone tablet above the main entrance.

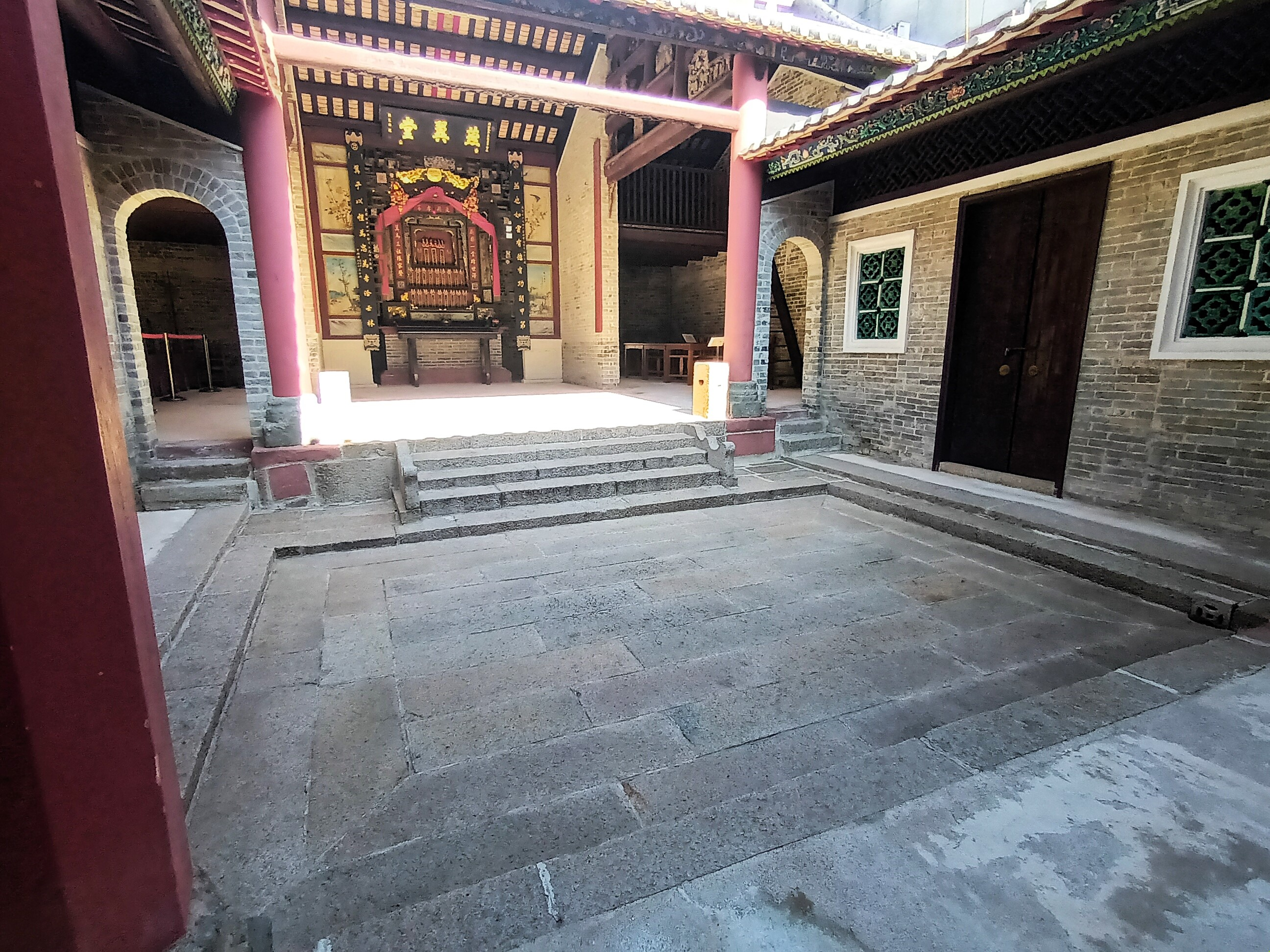
Yan Tun Kong Study Hall

Tat Tak Communal Hall (達德公所) is located north-west of Sheung Cheung Wai. It is a declared monument. The Yan Tun Kong Study Hall (仁敦岡書室) is another monument that is located in Hang Tau Tsuen. It is also a declared monument.

=== Well ===
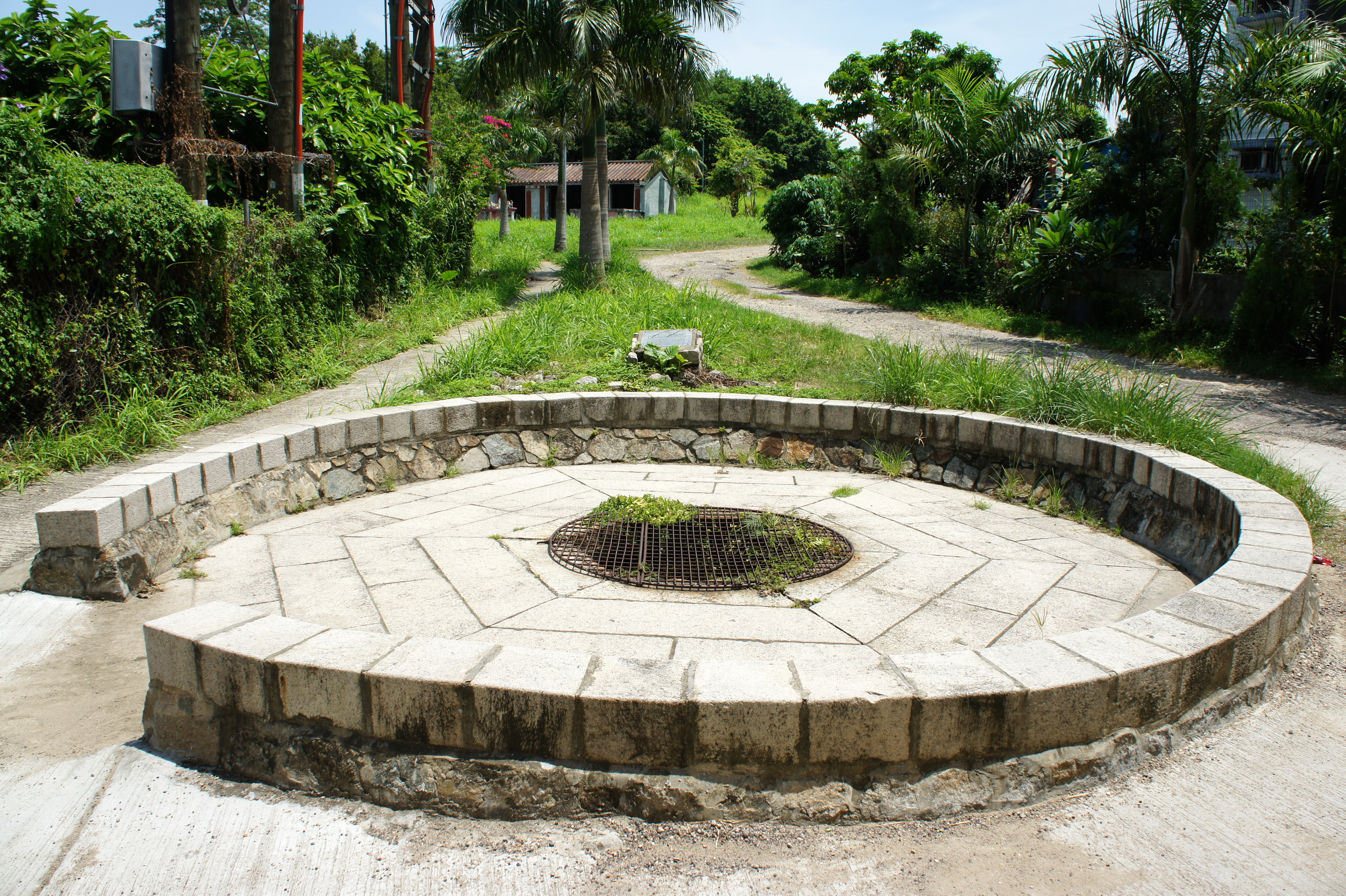
The well

On the trail between Yeung Hau Temple and Sheung Cheung Wai, there is an old well that, according to the Tang villagers, was built by the residents of Hang Tau Tsuen more than 200 years ago, although the exact date of its construction was unknown. The well was once the main source of drinking water for both villages.

=== Sheung Cheung Wai ===
Sheung Cheung Wai (上璋圍) is a walled village. It is one of the "Three Wais" (walled villages) of this part of Ping Shan. The other two are Fui Sha Wai (灰沙圍) and Kiu Tau Wai (橋頭圍). Built about 200 years ago by a line of the Tang Clan that branched out from nearby Hang Tau Tsuen, it is the only walled village along the Ping Shan Heritage Trail. The moat that once surrounded the village has been filled.

Three of the original watchtowers have collapsed and only the lower storey of the southwest one remains, which has been converted for residential use.

=== Shrine of the Earth God ===
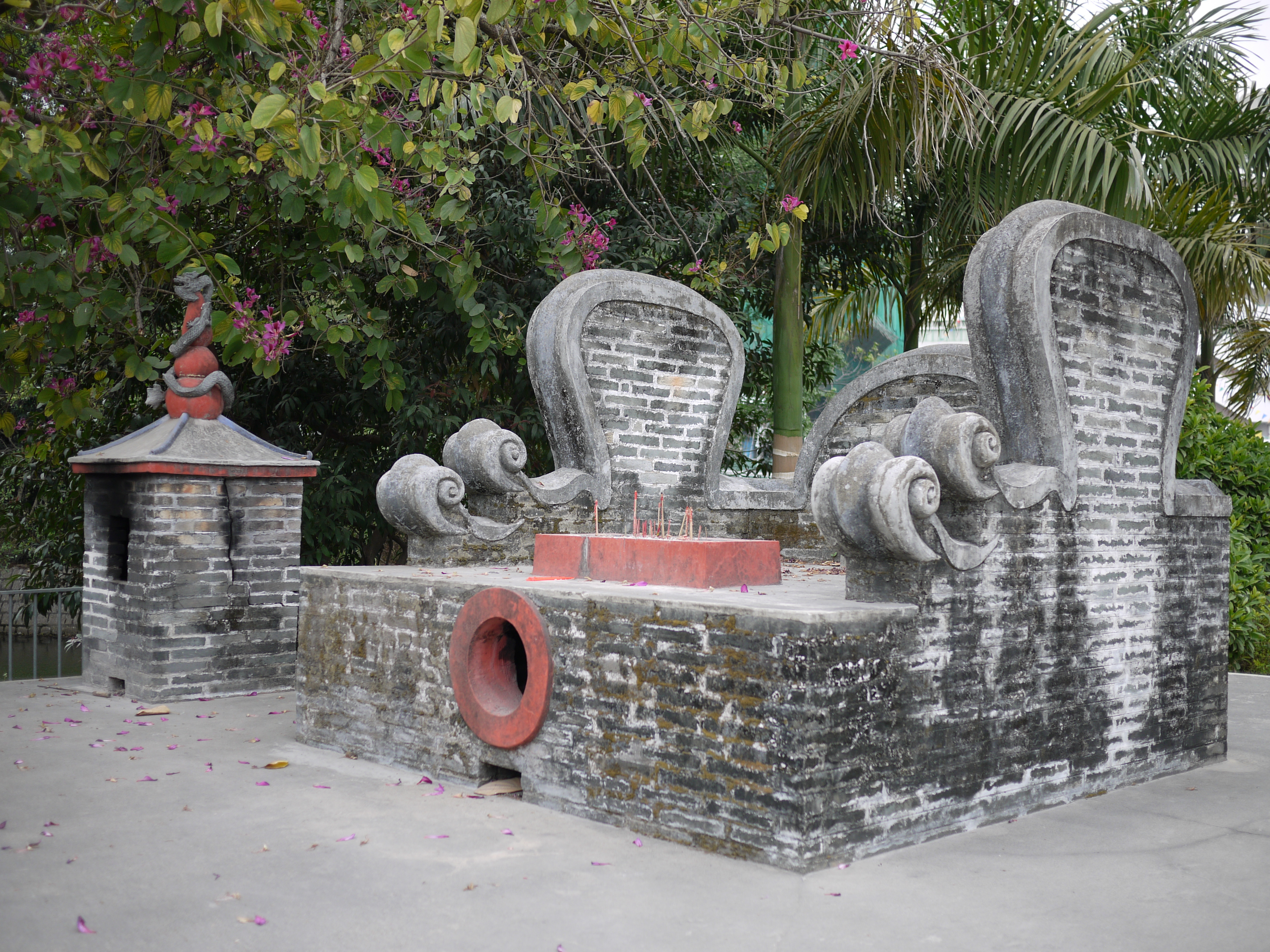
Shrine of the Earth God

Not far away to the west of Sheung Cheung Wai lies a shrine dedicated to the Earth God who is known to the villagers as "She Kung". "She Kung" altars are commonly found in traditional Chinese villages as "She Kung" is believed to be the protector of villagers. "She Kung" is also known as "Pak Kung", "To Tei Kung" and "Fuk Tak Kung". The shrines for "She Kung" are usually simple brick structures on which pieces of stone are placed to symbolize the presence of the Deity.

=== Tsui Sing Lau Pagoda ===
Tsui Sing Lau Pagoda (聚星樓) is Hong Kong's only ancient pagoda. The name in Chinese means "Pagoda of Gathering Stars". It became a declared monument on 14 December 2001. The Pagoda was built by Tang Yin-tung, the seventh generation ancestor, more than 600 years ago, according to the genealogy of the Tang clan of Ping Shan. It was built so that flooding disasters may be prevented to the village.

== Other sights ==
Several other historic buildings located in the area covered by the trail are not officially part of the trail.

Fui Sha Wai (灰沙圍) and Kiu Tau Wai (橋頭圍) are walled villages. They are part of the "Three Wais" of Ping Shan.

Ng Kwai Tong (五桂堂) is a sub-family ancestral Hall in Hang Tau Tsuen. It was probably built in 1822. Sau Choi Mansion (秀才故居), located at No. 64 Hang Mei Tsuen, is a 160-year-old mansion. As its former residents, Tang Shut-hing and Tang Tai-shing, obtained the posts through imperial civil service examination. The house is now called Sau Choi Mansion and was refurnished.

Sing Hin Kung Study Hall (聖軒公家塾) is located in Hang Mei Tsuen. It is a Grade II historic building that is not open to the public. Another building near it is Yeuk Hui Study Hall (若虛書室), located in Hang Mei Tsuen. It is listed as a Grade III historic building.

== See also ==
- Heritage trails in Hong Kong
- Lung Yeuk Tau Heritage Trail in Fanling, Hong Kong
