= NIS =

Nis, Niš, NiS or NIS may refer to:

== Places ==
- Niš, a city in Serbia
- Nis, Iran, a village
- Ness, Lewis (Scottish Gaelic: Nis), a village in the Outer Hebrides islands

== Businesses and organizations ==
- Naftna Industrija Srbije, Petroleum Industry of Serbia
- Nagoya International School
- Nanjing International School
- National Institute of Science, United States
- National Institute of Sports, India
- Nazarbayev Intellectual Schools
- Nederlandsch-Indische Spoorweg Maatschappij, railway company in the Dutch East Indies
- New Israeli Shekel, is the current currency of Israel
- Nippon Ichi Software, a video game developer
- Norwegian International School
- Norwegian International Ship Register, (Norwegian: Norsk Internasjonalt Skipsregister)
- Nuclear Information Service, independent UK organisation

=== Military, intelligence and security ===
- National Intelligence Service (disambiguation), abbreviated NIS in some countries
  - National Intelligence Service (Greece)
  - National Intelligence Service (South Africa), former agency
  - National Intelligence Service (South Korea)
- Norwegian Intelligence Service
- Naval Investigative Service, later Naval Criminal Investigative Service, U.S.
- Canadian Forces National Investigation Service (CFNIS; sometimes abbreviated to NIS)

== Science and technology ==
=== Chemistry and biology ===
- Nickel sulfide (chemical symbol NiS)
- N-Iodosuccinimide, a reagent
- Sodium-iodide symporter, a protein

=== Computing ===
- Network Information Service, directory service protocol
- Network information system, for managing utilities networks
- NIS Directive, the EU Directive on Security of Network and Information Systems

== Other uses ==
- National innovation system
- New Israeli Shekel (unofficial abbreviation), the currency of Israel
- Niš (boat), a sunk Yugoslav ferry
- Nordic Integrated System, for ski binding
- Johnson (rapper) (born 1979), Danish rapper previously known as NiggerenISlæden (N.I.S.)
