= Vali-ye Asr =

Vali-ye Asr or Vali Asr or Valieasr (Persian: وليعصر or ولي عصر) may refer to:

- Vali Asr, Ardabil
- Vali-ye Asr, East Azerbaijan
- Vali-ye Asr, Khuzestan
- Vali-ye Asr, Lorestan
- Valieasr, Lorestan
- Vali Asr, Mazandaran
