= Old Aberdeen Police Station =

Former police station in Hong Kong

Coordinates: 22.247691°N 114.156827°E

- 舊香港仔警署
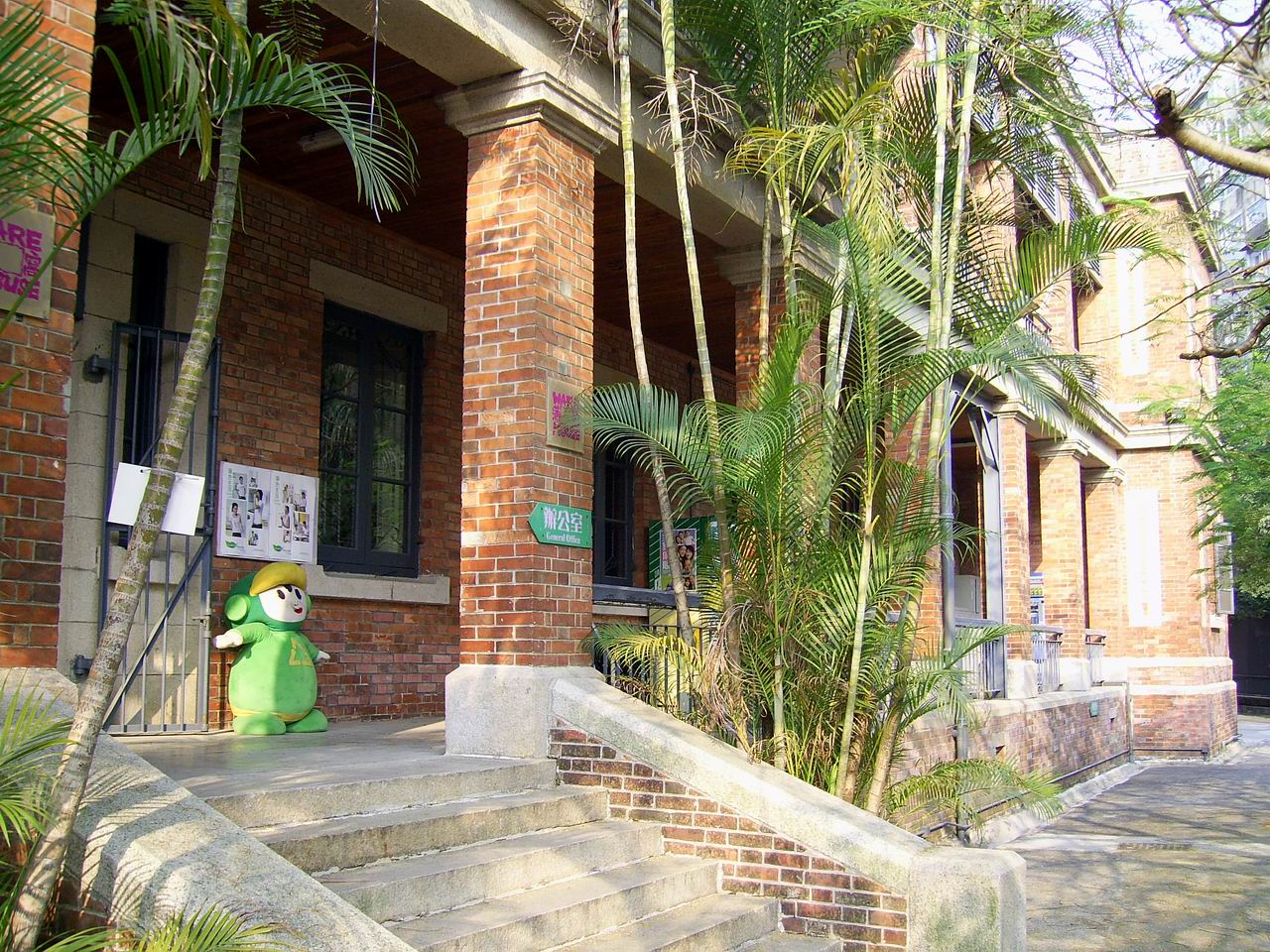
- Old Aberdeen Police Station
- Interactive map of the Old Aberdeen Police Station area

General information
- Type: Police station
- Location: Shek Pai Wan, Aberdeen, Hong Kong Island, 116 Aberdeen Main Road. Aberdeen, Hong Kong
- Opened: 1891; 135 years ago
- Closed: 1969; 57 years ago

Hong Kong Graded Building – Grade II
- Designated: 2009; 17 years ago
- Reference no.: 484

The Old Aberdeen Police Station (Chinese: 舊香港仔警署) is the second oldest existing police station in Hong Kong, second only to the Old Stanley Police Station. The station was built in 1891. It is located in Shek Pai Wan, Aberdeen and is currently listed as a Grade II historic building in Hong Kong. The old station building is currently used as the Warehouse Teenage Club.

== History ==
The station was built in 1891 as a replacement to an older station, with the purpose of strengthening the law and order of the community in the Southern District. The premises were bombed and badly damaged during the Second World War by the Japanese. The old police station was closed in 1969 after a new police station was constructed in Wong Chuk Hang Road.

The station building was repurposed several times by the government following its decommission. The building was used as a detective training school from 1969 to 1980, then used as the Marine Police Training School from 1979 to 1982. It was further repurposed to become the Marine South Station from 1982 to 1986.

The building was vacant until 1995, where it was then rented to a non-profit organisation, The Warehouse, transforming the building into the present-day Warehouse Teenage Club.

The building was listed as a Grade II historic building in 2009.

== Architecture ==
The Old Aberdeen Police Station was built in the style of Neo-Classical Colonial style with Arts and Crafts influences. The building itself is composed of a main building with two annex buildings.

The main building is a rectangular two-storey building with open front verandahs constructed with red Canton brickwork. The roof of the main building was pitched but was later converted into a flat roof, which the roof has tall chimney stacks project upwards. The brickwork is trimmed with granite string courses and moulded projecting cornices.

The verandah columns of the main building were constructed with granite bases and capitals, while the windows are equipped with granite cills and lintels. The narrow strips of granite on either side resemble Chinese couplets. The rear elevation is plainer with an extended verandah roofed with Chinese tiles. The original casement windows, metal balustrades, and sun baffles are still intact.

The annex buildings are all single-storey, which they were built in a similar but much simpler style to the main building with red bricks, stone dressings, extended verandahs and Chinese tiled pitched roofs. The original doors, windows, and chimney stacks of the annex buildings are still intact.

== See also ==
- Historic police buildings in Hong Kong
