= The Hong Kong Research Institute of Textiles and Apparel =

Hong Kong Research Institute of Textiles and Apparel 香港紡織及成衣研發中心
- Established: 2006; 20 years ago
- Research type: R&D for textiles and clothing industries in Hong Kong
- Location: Hong Kong
- Operating agency: The Hong Kong Polytechnic University
- Website: www.hkrita.com

The Hong Kong Research Institute of Textiles and Apparel (HKRITA) is a public research institute in Hong Kong. It was established in April 2006 and hosted by The Hong Kong Polytechnic University (PolyU). With funding support from the Innovation and Technology Commission, HKSAR Government, it acts as a focal point to enhance technological innovation in textiles and apparel industry for the development of highly competitive industrial clusters in Hong Kong and the Greater Bay Area.

== Research ==
HKRITA carried out in-house research projects since 2014. Most of the research projects fall under three major domains: Industry, Sustainability, and Social Benefits; specially devoting the research efforts to waterless solutions, green technologies, and active performance wearable systems. HKRITA has received 80 Hong Kong, mainland and overseas awards and filed 86 IPs.

HKRITA has adopted four technology focus areas for R&D projects, namely:

1. New Materials and Textiles and Apparel Products;
2. Advanced Textiles and Clothing Production Technologies;
3. Innovative Design and Evaluation Technologies; and
4. Enhanced Industrial Systems and Infrastructure

== Projects ==
Set up in 2018, the Garment-to-Garment (G2G) Recycle System is the mini scale production line set up in a retail shop recycling post-consumer garment to a new one. It demonstrates integral and closed-loop garment recycling process. It is an environmentally friendly process without using any water and chemicals. It won several awards including Gold Award of the 2020 Hong Kong Green Innovations Awards (HKGIA), Good Design Best100 2021, Gold Medal of the 47th International Exhibition of Inventions of Geneva in 2019, Red Dot Award: Product Design 2019, The Gold Award of Asia International Innovative Invention Award 2019 and Fast Company’s 2019 Innovation by Design Awards (Retail Environments Category)

The Green Machine is an efficient hydrothermal treatment method to decompose cotton into cellulose powders, hence enabling the separation of the polyester fibres from the blends. The separated polyester fibres can be used for spinning. The cellulose powders, decomposed from the cotton, can be applied to functional products such as super-absorbency materials. It won several awards, including Silver Award in the Hong Kong Green Innovations Awards in 2017, Gold Medal in the 46th International Exhibition of Inventions of Geneva in 2018 and Gold Award in Asia International Innovative Invention Award in 2019.

The first industrial scale Green Machine was operated in PT Kahatex, an established textile manufacturer in Indonesia. Isko, one of the world’s leading denim producers, acquired a licensing agreement for Green Machine. Besides, HKRITA has cooperated with The Deutsche Gesellschaft für Internationale Zusammenarbeit (GIZ), H&M Foundation, Chip Mong Insee Cement Corporation, Dakota Industrial Co Ltd and VF Corporation to launch a feasibility study through GIZ’s regional project, Fostering and Advancing Sustainable Business and Responsible Industrial Practices in the Clothing Industry (FABRIC) to assess the industrial scale development of the Green Machine in Cambodia.

HKRITA has also cooperated with Hong Kong Sports Institute to develop High Performance Sportswear for HKSI’s Rowing Team to support athletes to participate in local and overseas competitions, such as Olympics Game.

In 2020, HKRITA and the Government of Hong Kong introduced CuMask+, a reusable mask which is capable of immobilising bacteria, common viruses and other harmful substances. HKRITA conducted research on washable and reusable masks with a funding of HK$1.28 million (US$165,100) by the Innovation and Technology Fund from the government. It has been awarded gold medal at the 46th International Exhibition of Inventions of Geneva in 2018. HKRITA subsequently improved the technologies adopted for the mask to develop CuMask+. In May 2020, the government announced that they will distribute CuMask+ to all residents in Hong Kong.

== Partnerships and collaborations ==
HKRITA embraces multilateral research and technology cooperation with international research institutes. To promote technology application to our society, HKRITA also collaborates with local enterprises such as PMQ, CHAT, The Mills on smart textiles and materials recycling exploration as well as knowledge sharing and technology support.

In 2016, HKRITA and the non-profit H&M Foundation entered into a four-year partnership to develop the required technologies to recycle blend textiles into new fabrics and yarns. Used apparel will be collected and recycled into new textile materials through chemical treatment or bioprocessing. The technology will be opened for application to encourage broad market access and reduced impact on the environment. In 2020, HKRITA and The H&M Foundation started a new five year collaboration plan under the theme of 'Planet First' - to drive the sustainable development of the textile and fashion industry.

Since 2007, HKRITA started to host the Innovation and Technology Symposium to enhance knowledge sharing. It was an event brought together industry leaders, researchers, thought leaders, and scholars to explore solutions, introduce new technologies, and enhance the competitiveness of the industry.
