= Historic police buildings in Hong Kong =

Several police buildings in Hong Kong are listed as historic monuments. While some of them are still serving their initial purpose, most of them have been decommissioned and have been redeveloped or are awaiting redevelopment.

== Historic police stations ==
Historic police stations include:

Name	Photographs	Location	Notes/References
Old Stanley Police Station		22.21831°N 114.213121°E	Built in 1859, a declared monument. Now used as a Wellcome supermarket.
Central Police Station		22.28174°N 114.154196°E	Built in 1864, a declared monument
Former Marine Police Headquarters Compound		22.295479°N 114.169994°E	Built in 1884. Now a heritage hotel with food and beverage outlets, and retail facilities. A declared monument.
Peak Police Station		No. 92 Peak Road, The Peak. 22.264395°N 114.155172°E	Built in 1886. A Grade III Historic Building.
Old Aberdeen Police Station		No. 116 Aberdeen Main Road, Aberdeen. 22.247691°N 114.156827°E	Built in 1891. A Grade II Historic Building.
Old Tai Po Police Station		22.446422°N 114.169735°E	Built in 1899. A declared monument.
Old Ping Shan Police Station		22.446422°N 114.169735°E	Built in 1899. Now used as the Ping Shan Tang Clan Gallery cum Heritage Trail Visitors Centre. A Grade II Historic Building.
Former Tiu Keng Leng Police Station aka. Rennie's Mill Police Station (舊調景嶺警署)		No. 160 Po Lam Road South, Tiu Keng Leng 22.309155°N 114.251407°E	Built in 1900. Closed in 1941. Since 1999, it was partially used by the Po Yin Fat Yuen, a monastery founded in 1956, after the original monastery building was torn down with the clearance of the nearby squatter area in 1996. Its function as a monastery ceased in 2015.
Old Tai O Police Station		22.25322°N 113.853686°E	Built in 1902, a Grade III Historic Building. Converted into a boutique hotel.
Old Sheung Shui Police Station (舊上水警署)		22.508248°N 114.125432°E	Built in 1902. Now housing a Junior Police Corps (JPC) Club House. It is a Grade III historic building.
Cheung Chau Police Station (長洲警署)		No. 4 Police Station Path, Cheung Chau. 22.208184°N 114.030602°E	Built in 1913. A Grade II Historic Building. Still used as a police station.
Lok Ma Chau Police Station		No. 100 Lok Ma Chau Road, Lok Ma Chau. 22.511544°N 114.080218°E	Built in 1915. A Grade II Historic Building. Still used as a police station.
Yau Ma Tei Police Station		22.309676°N 114.168704°E	Built in 1922, a Grade III Historic Building, closed and relocated in 2016
Sham Shui Po Police Station		22.329986°N 114.159088°E	Built in 1924, a Grade III Historic Building
Former Sha Tin Police Station		No. 102 Sha Tin Tau Village 22.374062°N 114.187841°E	Built around 1924. Converted into the High Rock Christian Camp in 1980. A Grade II Historic Building.
Old Kowloon Police Headquarters (舊九龍警察總部)		22.324525°N 114.168835°E	Built in 1925. Now part of the Mong Kok Police Station. Grade II Historic Building.
Wan Chai Police Station		22.279248°N 114.175286°E	Built in 1932. A Grade III Historic Building.
Old Upper Levels Police Station		No. 1F High Street, Sai Ying Pun. 22.285441°N 114.145261°E	Built in 1934-1935. It was later used as the Crime Hong Kong Island Regional Headquarters. Now part of the David Trench Rehabilitation Centre. A Grade III Historic Building.
Ta Kwu Ling Police Station		Ping Che Road, Ta Kwu Ling. 22.540853°N 114.148764°E	Built in 1937. Still used as a police station. A Grade III Historic Building.
Former Wan Chai Gap Police Station		22.26765°N 114.169197°E	Built in 1939. Now housing the Hong Kong Police Museum.
Former Lau Fau Shan Police Station		Lau Fau Shan.22.469035°N 113.983795°E	Built in 1962. Used until 2002. Awaiting adaptive reuse. It has been proposed to be converted into a restaurant with exhibition space to reminisce the history of the oyster farming industry of Lau Fau Shan. A Grade III Historic Building.

== Demolished police stations ==
Name	Photographs	Location	Notes/References
Old Sha Tin Police Station		Tung Lo Wan Hill Road, Sha Tin District 22.379503°N 114.1805391°E	Demolished. Built in 1950 and demolished in 2004. After being decommissioned as a police station, it housed the Regional Continuation Training Centre. It is now the site of The Great Hill private housing estate.
Au Tau Police Station		Au Tau, Yuen Long District 22.4434°N 114.0453°E	Demolished. Built in 1900 and demolished in 1942.
Starling Inlet Police Station		Sha Tau Kok, North District 22.537557°N 114.211044°E	Demolished. Built in 1899 and demolished in 1942. The Sha Tau Kok Police Station now occupies the site.

== Historic police quarters ==
Name	Photographs	Location	Notes/References
Old Police Bungalow		Nos. 173 and 175 Kwong Fuk Road, Tai Po 22.447477°N 114.169924°E	Built in 1909. The bungalow was the residence of four single police officers at the time when it was built. In 1991, the bungalow was taken over by the Norwegian International School as a kindergarten. The detached servants' quarters (pictured) and stable building were believed to have been built at the same time as the bungalow. It is a Grade II historic building.
Hollywood Road Police R & F Married Quarters		No. 35 Aberdeen Street, Central. 22.283406°N 114.151819°E	Built in 1951.

== See also ==
- History of Hong Kong Police
- Adaptive reuse
- Heritage conservation in Hong Kong
- History of Hong Kong (1800s–1930s)
