= Old Stanley Police Station =

Historic building in Hong Kong

Coordinates: 22.21831°N 114.213121°E

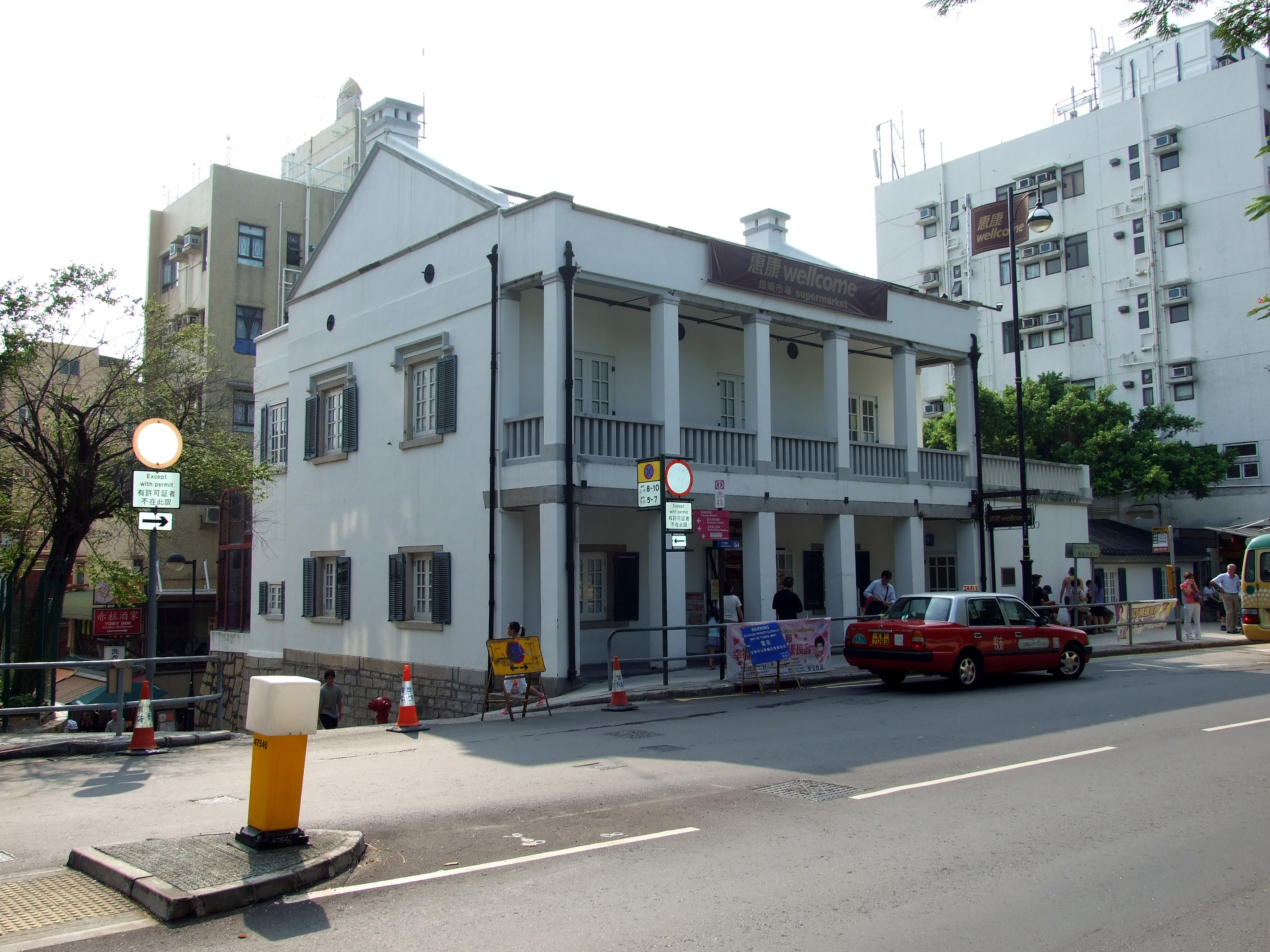
Old Stanley Police Station

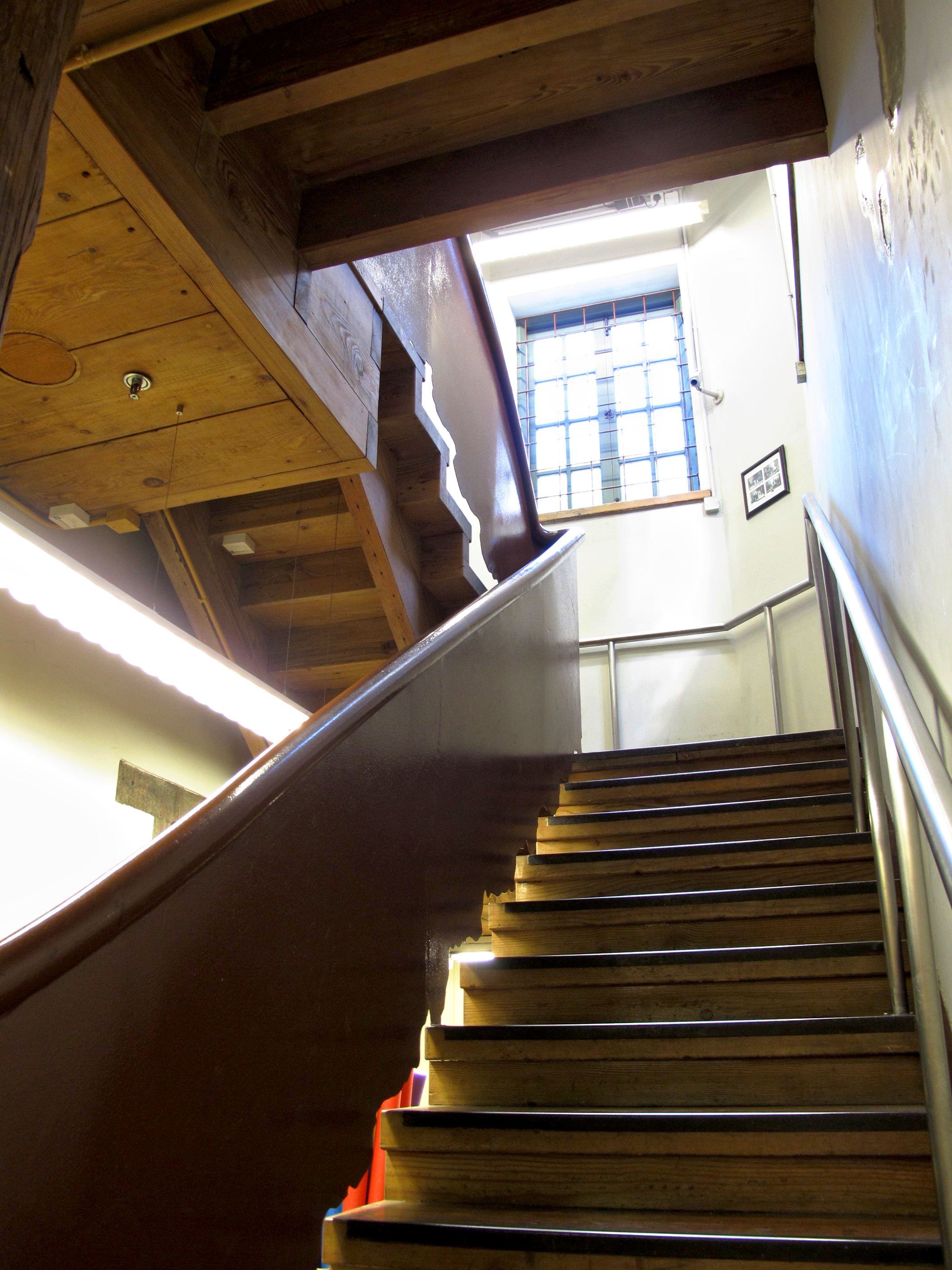
Old Stanley Police interior stairs

The Old Stanley Police Station (Chinese: 舊赤柱警署) was a police station constructed in 1859 in Stanley, Hong Kong Island. It is now the oldest remaining police station building in Hong Kong, and was declared a monument on 15 January 1984.

The British Army, during the early years of the colonial era, used the station from time to time in conjunction with the police because of its strategic position as the most southerly outpost on Hong Kong Island. During the Japanese Occupation, the Japanese Gendarmerie used the police station as a local headquarters and a mortuary was built onto the building.

After the war, the building reverted to its original use and served as a police station until 1974. Since then, it has had a number of unrelated uses including a sub-office of the Southern District Office, a restaurant, and currently it is used as a Wellcome supermarket.

There have been various attempts to have the government discontinue its commercial use, and to use it for some official function. One recent suggestion was to use it as a branch of the Hong Kong Police Museum.

== See also ==
- Historic police buildings in Hong Kong
