= Hong Kong Police Museum =

Museum in Hong Kong

- 警隊博物館

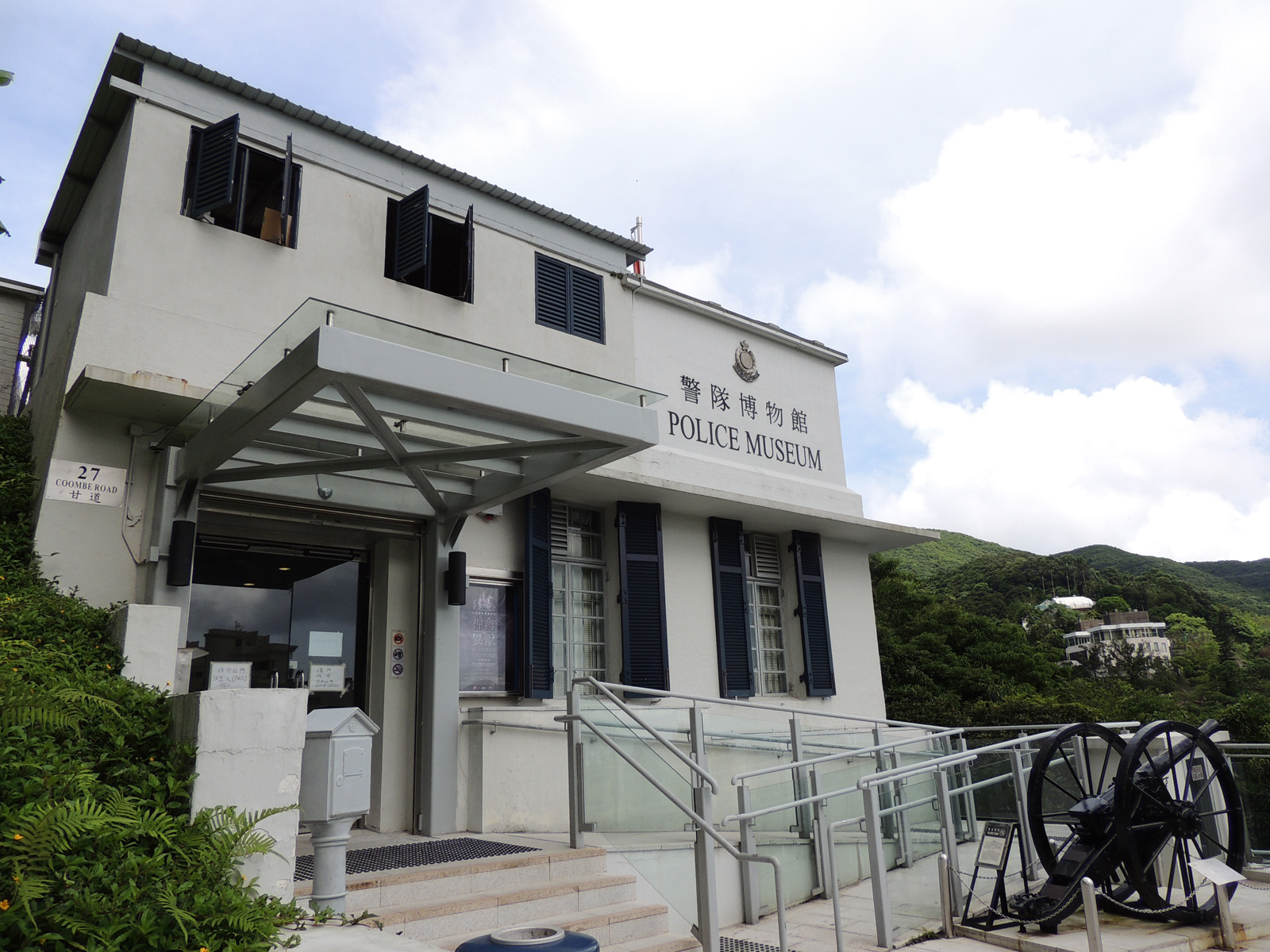
- Hong Kong Police Museum
- Established: 1988
- Location: 27 Coombe Road, The Peak, Hong Kong
- Collection size: 1,200 exhibits
- Owner: Hong Kong Police Force
- Website: Official website

Hong Kong Police Museum
- Traditional Chinese: 警隊博物館
- Simplified Chinese: 警队博物馆
Transcriptions
Standard Mandarin
- Hanyu Pinyin: Jǐngduì Bówùguǎn
Yue: Cantonese
- Yale Romanization: Gíng deuih bok maht gún
- Jyutping: Ging2 deoi6 bok3 mat6 gun2

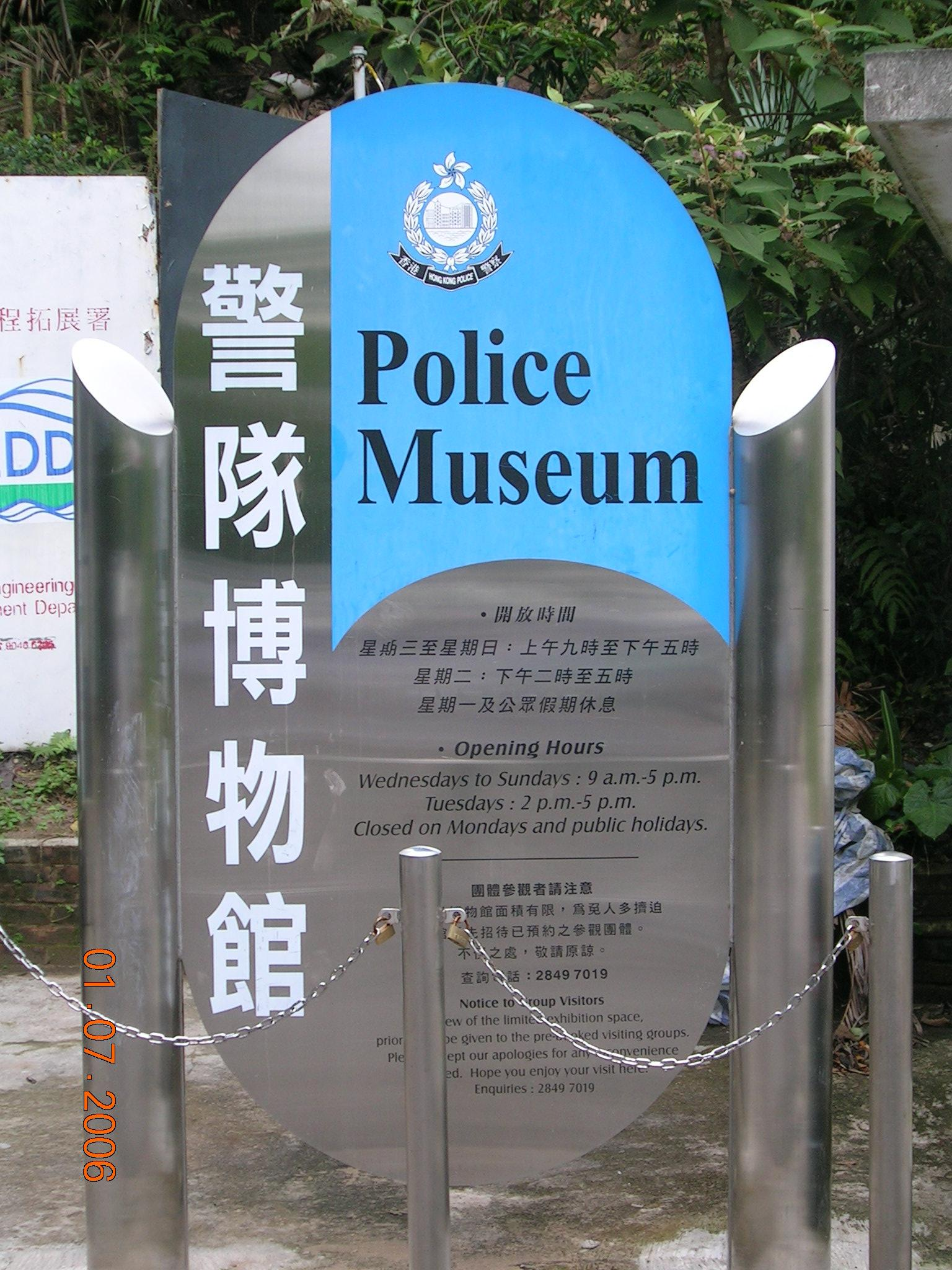

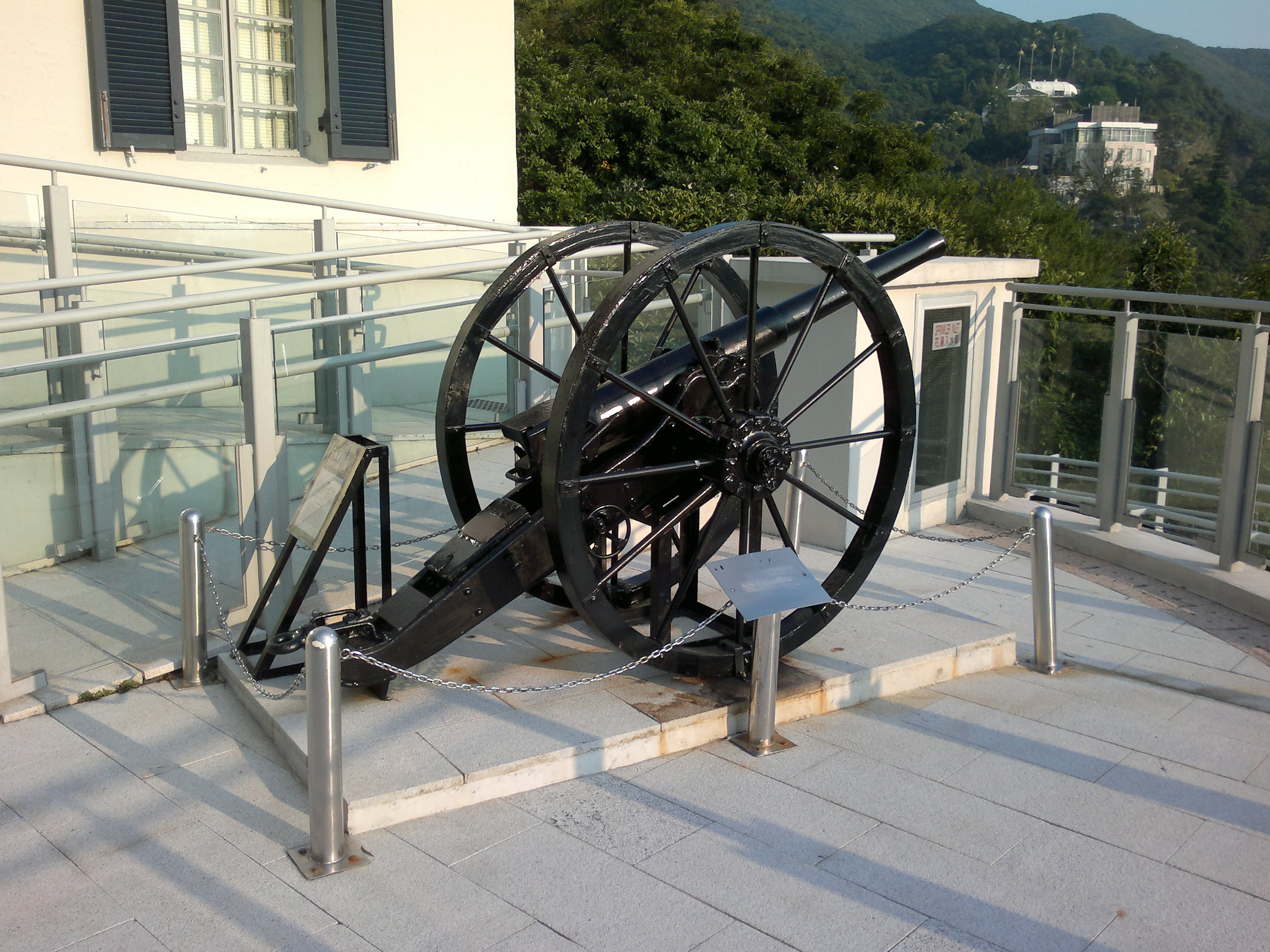
Field gun

The Police Museum is a museum dedicated to the history of policing in Hong Kong. The museum is housed in the former Wan Chai Gap Police Station, located at 27 Coombe Road, Wan Chai Gap, The Peak. About 1,200 exhibits are displayed in the Museum and there is generally one rotating specialised exhibition display.

The revitalisation of the Police Museum commenced in mid-2020. The revitalised Museum once again opened to the public in September 2022 with a new look.

== History ==
The Police Museum was forerun by the Police Historical Records Committee which formed in 1964. The Committee collected a significant number of artifacts relating to the history of the Hong Kong Police Force and proposed the foundation of a museum to display them.

The Police Museum was originally housed in Police Headquarters; it was started in a limited form in 1976 and later moved to Tai Sang Commercial Building in Wan Chai, and moved to the former Wan Chai Gap Police Station in 1988.

== The Tai Po field gun ==
The field gun is displayed at the entrance. It had guarded over the Old Tai Po Police Station for 45 years. It is worldwide one of only two surviving examples of this type of 7.7 cm FK 96.

== Galleries ==
There are five galleries in the Police Museum.

=== Orientation gallery ===
This gallery describes the general history of the Hong Kong Police Force through historical photographs, historical archives, uniforms, equipment, firearms and other artifacts. Significant exhibits includes the head of the 'Sheung Shui Tiger' which was shot in 1915 after killing a policeman. The old Luk Yee or Green Coat uniform of Chinese constables, The donation of memorabilia from the widow of a former Commissioner of Police, Mr. Duncan Macintosh, a 'Plague Medal' of 1894 and examples of various counterfeit banknotes are also displayed in this gallery.

=== Narcotics gallery ===
The gallery describes the narcotic problem in Hong Kong with the display of replica drugs, drug smoking and trafficking paraphernalia. There is an example of a heroin manufacturing laboratory.

=== Triad Societies gallery ===
The gallery reviews the history of local Triad Societies, the scope of their activities and the beliefs and rituals that have been known to be practised by the members.

=== Current exhibition gallery ===
The gallery is a thematic exhibition gallery with displays being changed from time to time.

== Opening hours ==
Opening Hours Tuesday to Sunday and Public Holidays: 9 a.m. to 5 p.m.

Closed on Monday (except Public Holidays) and the first two days of the Chinese New Year

== See also ==
- Historic police station buildings in Hong Kong
- List of museums in Hong Kong
