= PMQ (Hong Kong) =

Historic building in Hong Kong

Coordinates: 22.283354°N 114.151862°E

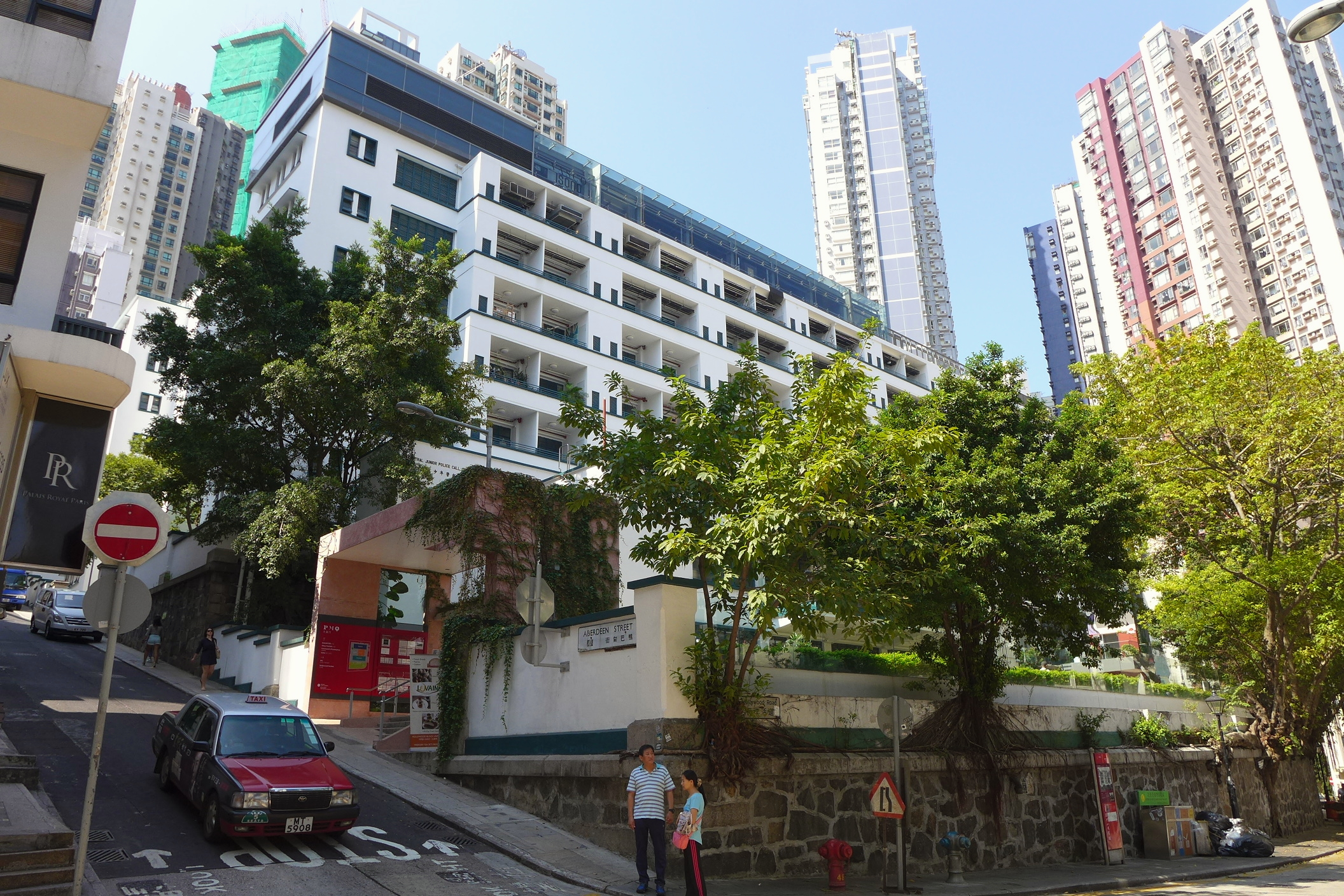
- PMQ in October 2015
- Interactive map of the PMQ area
- Former names: Police Married Quarters

General information
- Status: Grade 3 Historic Building
- Location: 35 Aberdeen Street, Central, Hong Kong
- Completed: 1951; 75 years ago
- Renovated: 2014; 12 years ago
- Renovation cost: HK$577 million

Technical details
- Floor area: Approx 6,013 sqm.

Renovating team
- Architect: Architectural Services Department
- Awards: HKIE Structural Excellence Grand Award, QBA Quality Excellence Award, HKIA Special Architectural Award, RICS Hong Kong Award, HKILA Merit Design Award

Website
- pmq.org.hk

PMQ
- Traditional Chinese: 元創方
Transcriptions
Yue: Cantonese
- Yale Romanization: Yùhn chong fōng
- Jyutping: Jyun4 cong3 fong3

Police Married Quarters
- Traditional Chinese: 已婚警察宿舍
Transcriptions
Yue: Cantonese
- Yale Romanization: Yíh fān gíng chaat sūk se
- Jyutping: Ji5 fan1 ging2 caat3 suk1 se3

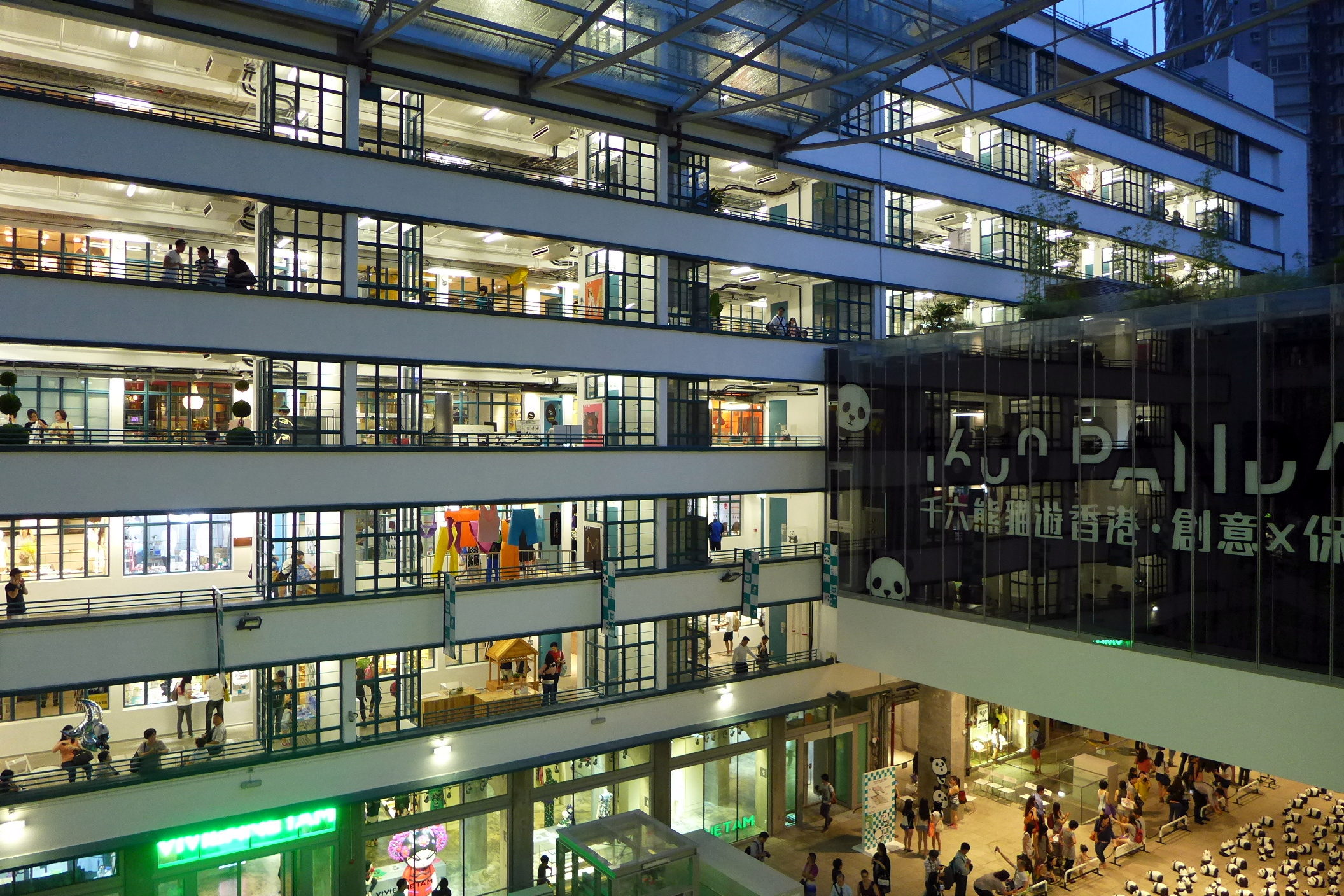
Block Stauton (view from block Hollywood)

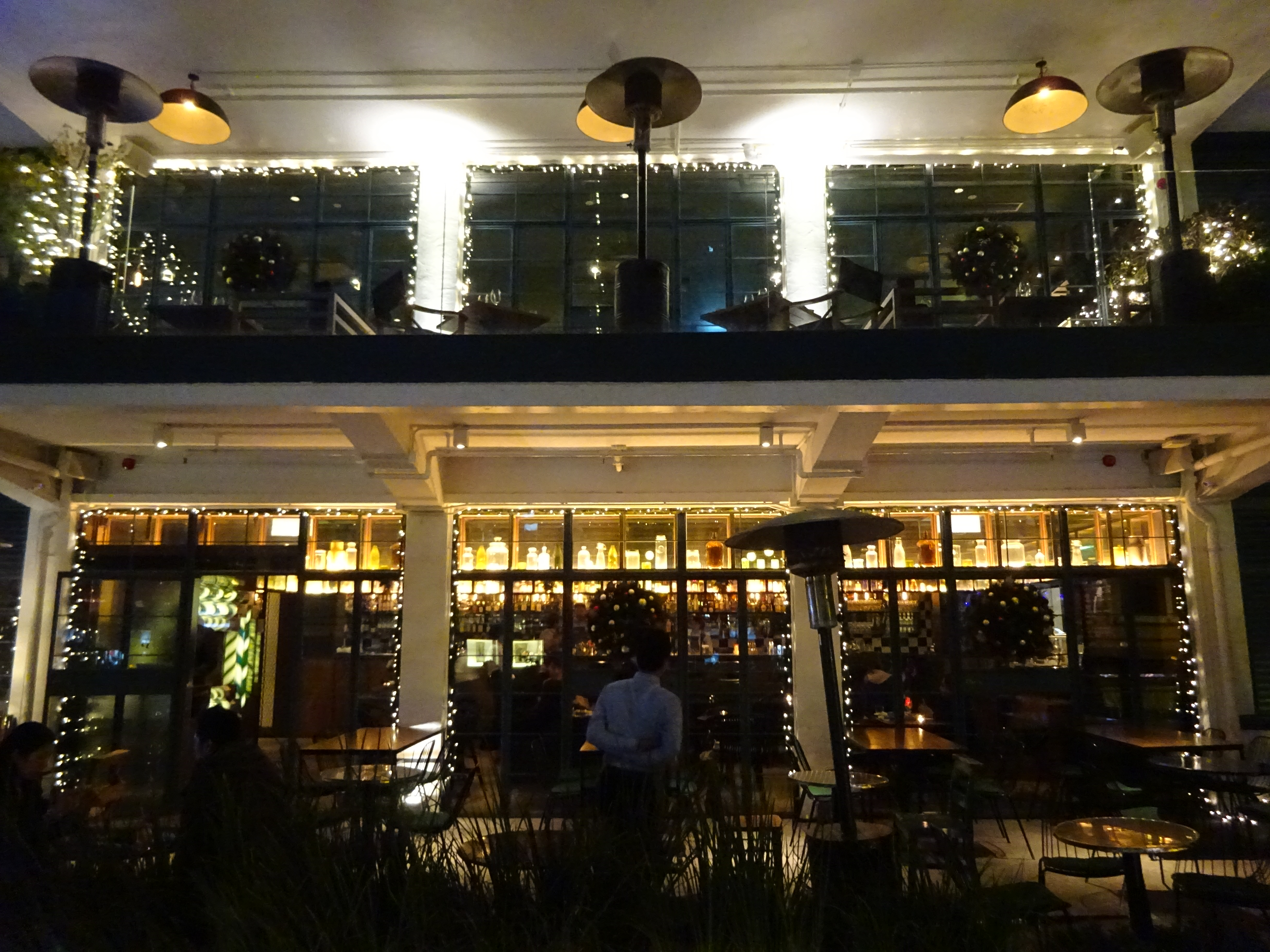
Restaurant (former Central Junior Police Call Clubhouse)

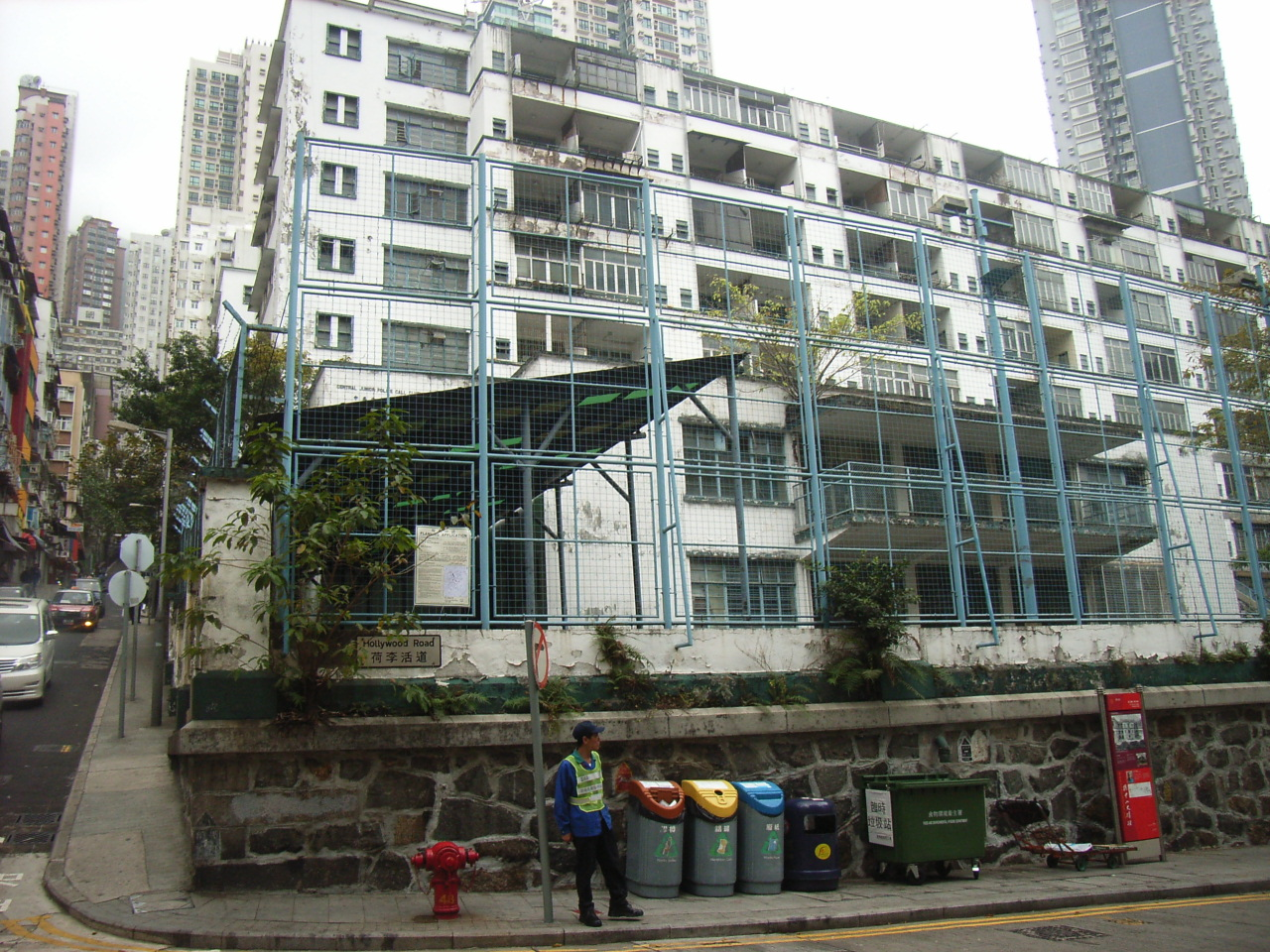
The Former Hollywood Road Police Married Quarters before renovation, in 2007

PMQ (formerly, Police Married Quarters) is the historic site of the old Hollywood Road Police Married Quarters, which is now a mixed-use arts and design venue in Hong Kong, between Aberdeen Street, Staunton Street, Hollywood Road, and Shing Wong Street.

The site occupies what was originally the grounds of Queen's College, which was built on the site in 1889. After damage during World War II, it was repurposed as quarters for married junior policemen. The compound has been listed as a Grade III historic building since 2010. In 2014, after nearly 15 years of disuse, it was renamed PMQ and opened to the public. Its residential units were turned into exhibitions spaces, studios, shops and offices for creative enterprises.

== History ==
The Central Government School was built on Gough Street in 1862 and was the first government primary and secondary school in Hong Kong which provided Western education to the public. In 1889, due to the increasing number of students, the school relocated to a new campus on Hollywood Road. Later on the school was renamed 'Victoria College', then Queen's College in 1894. At that time, the school was one of the largest and most expensive buildings in Hong Kong. Many local leaders and talent were nurtured at this school, including the Father of Modern China, Dr Sun Yat-sen, and business tycoons such as Sir Robert Ho Tung. However, during the Japanese occupation in 1941, the building was destroyed. In 1948, the remaining building was demolished. In 1951, in order to increase police recruitment in response to the influx of Chinese immigrants after the Chinese Civil War, PMQ provided 140 single room units and 28 double room units for the rank and file officers serving at the nearby Central Police Station. Former Hong Kong Chief Executives C.Y. Leung and Donald Tsang have both lived there. In 2000, the building was emptied. In 2009, the 'Conserving Central' project mentioned in the Policy Address that eight heritage sites in Central including PMQ should be renovated. In April 2014, PMQ started to operate as a creative hub.

== Features ==
The original site area was around 6,000 square meters. After the revitalization, the total floor areas became 18,000 square meters. Because the location is near galleries and boutiques along Hollywood Road and SoHo, it was successful in attracting around 100 design galleries, shops, bookstores and office units. Moreover, there are 15 ‘pop- up’ units for design exhibitions and outlets. The 1,000-square-meter central courtyard has held events like "Panda-mania" in 2014, with 1,600 paper versions of the endangered animal. To promote the historic background of PMQ, a tunnel allows visitors to go through the foundation of the former Victoria College.

== Conservation policy ==
Between 2005 and 2007, the Antiquities and Monuments Office (AMO) investigated the remnants of PMQ. They found the remains of the Central School, including granite shafts and plinths of the boundary walls and the retaining wall; the quoin stones at the corners of the site; and the steps. The AMO rated PMQ as Grade III Historic Building in 2010.

In 2008, the government underwent a public engagement exercise on PMQ. In response, the government based revitalisation plans on six principles:

- Preserve historic relics
- Emphasize the cultural and historical value and the original ambience
- Give it a new lease of life by gathering creative industries to make it a landmark for local residents and visitors
- Contribute to the urban planning along Hollywood Road and the surrounding area on the proposed ‘spot, line and area’ heritage conservation methods
- Respond to community concerns about the development density and the building height
- Fulfill community expectations of having more public space

== Architecture ==
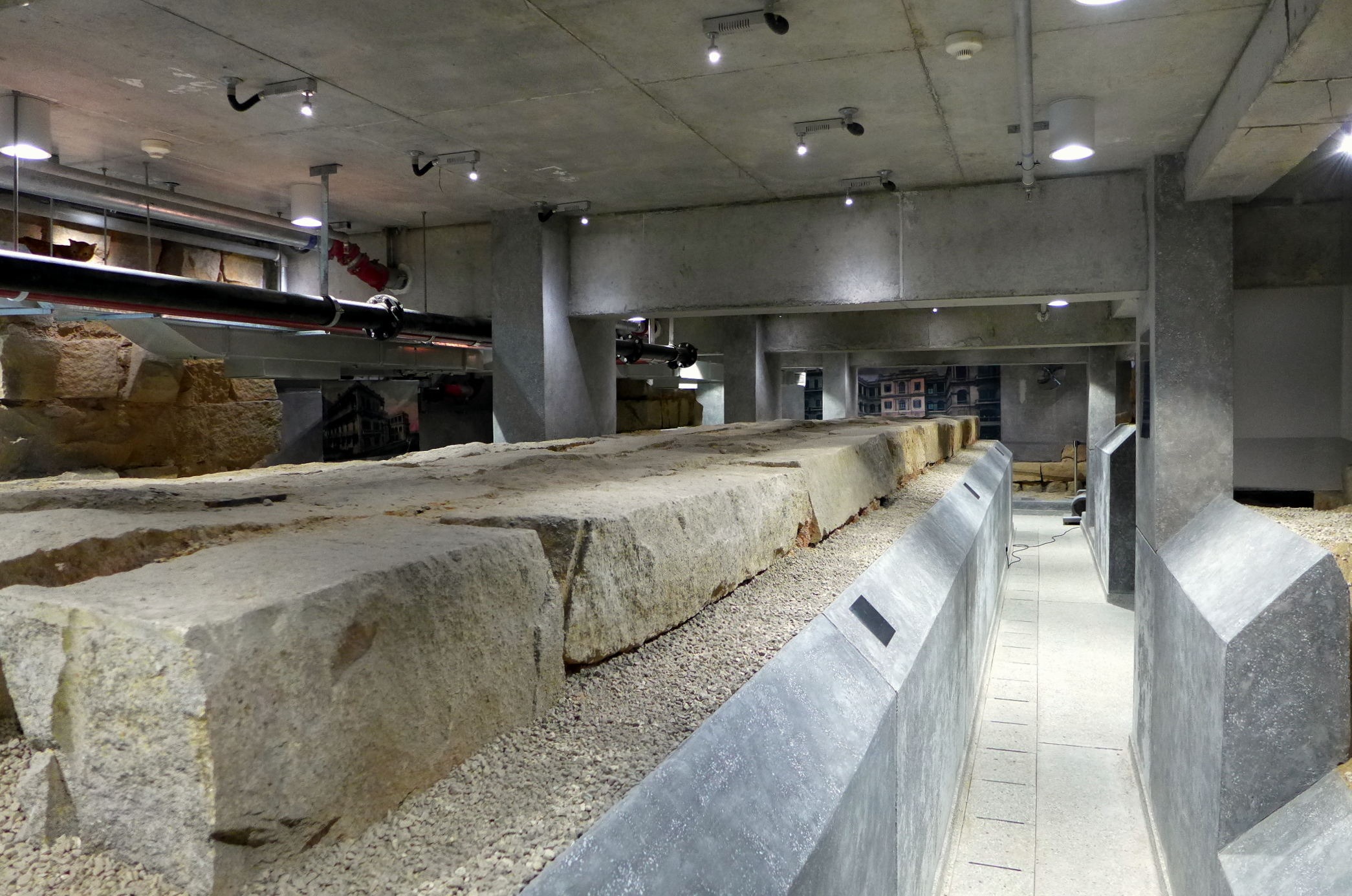
A glimpse of the PMQ

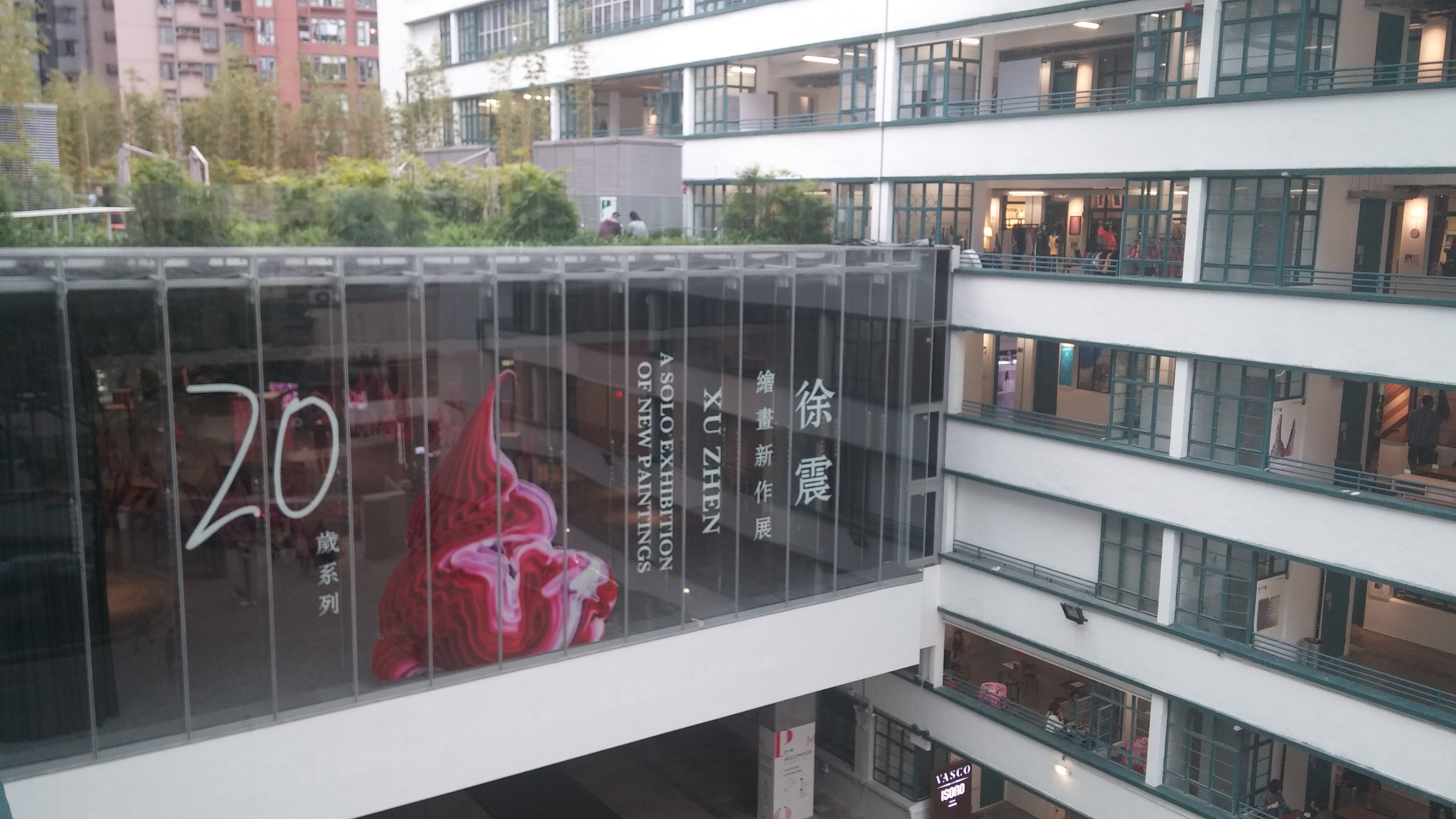
QUBE

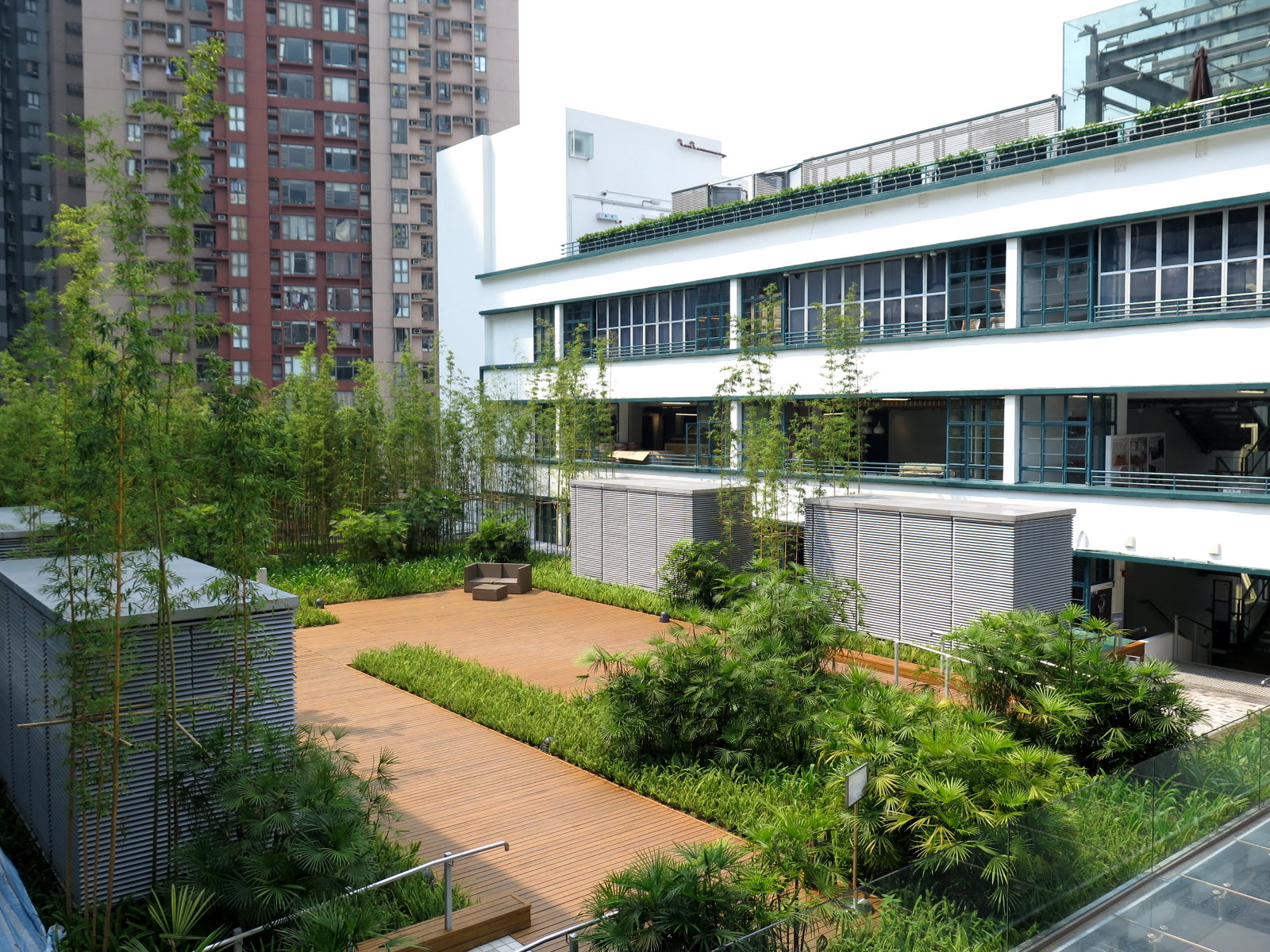
The rooftop garden 'PLATEAU'

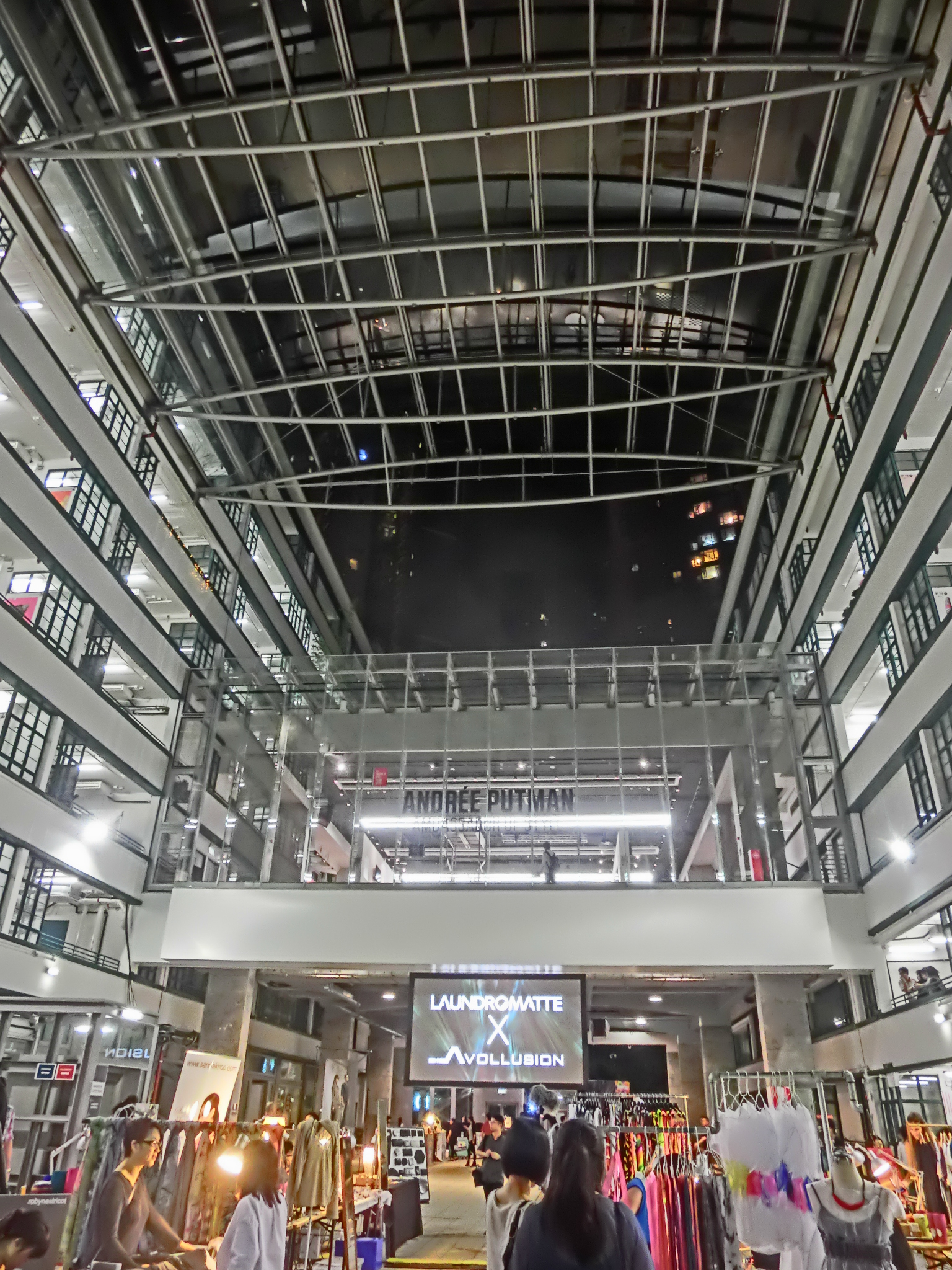
Glass ceiling

PMQ consists of two, seven-storey blocks of the former Hollywood Road Police Married Quarters, named Stauton and Hollywood, and the former Central Junior Police Call Clubhouse. The former clubhouse now houses restaurants. One additional feature, named 'QUBE', was added as the linkage between the two blocks, with a rooftop garden called 'PLATEAU' on the fourth floor.

Some modern designs were deployed, such as a UV-protective glass ceiling.

Heritage can be found in the main entrance of the quarters. The granite steps and rubble retaining wall, entrance at Staunton Street were from the Central school. Guests can take the free Underground Interpretation Area Walk-in Tour or the PMQ Heritage Interpretation Guided Tour.

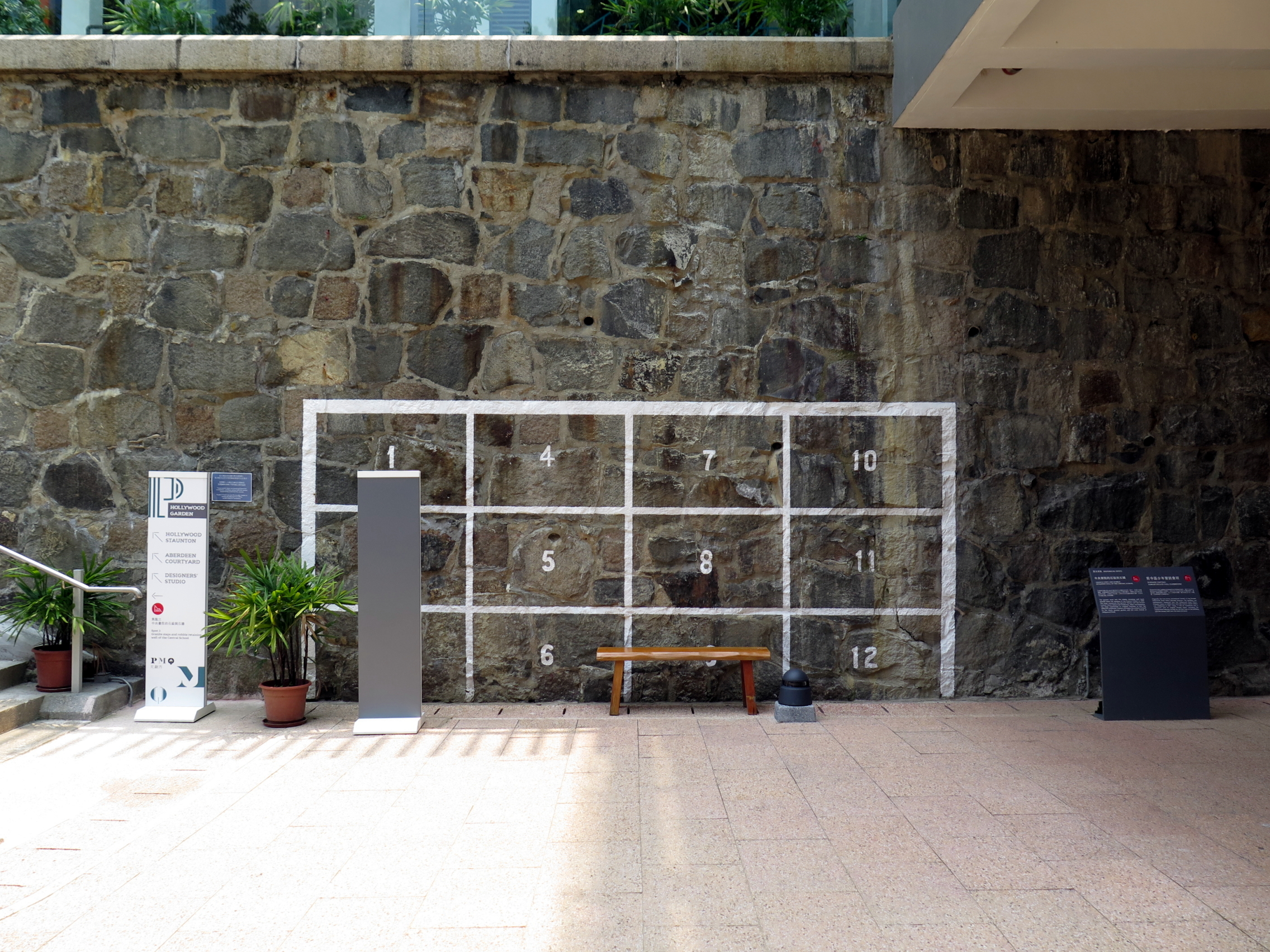
Granite steps and rubble retaining wall

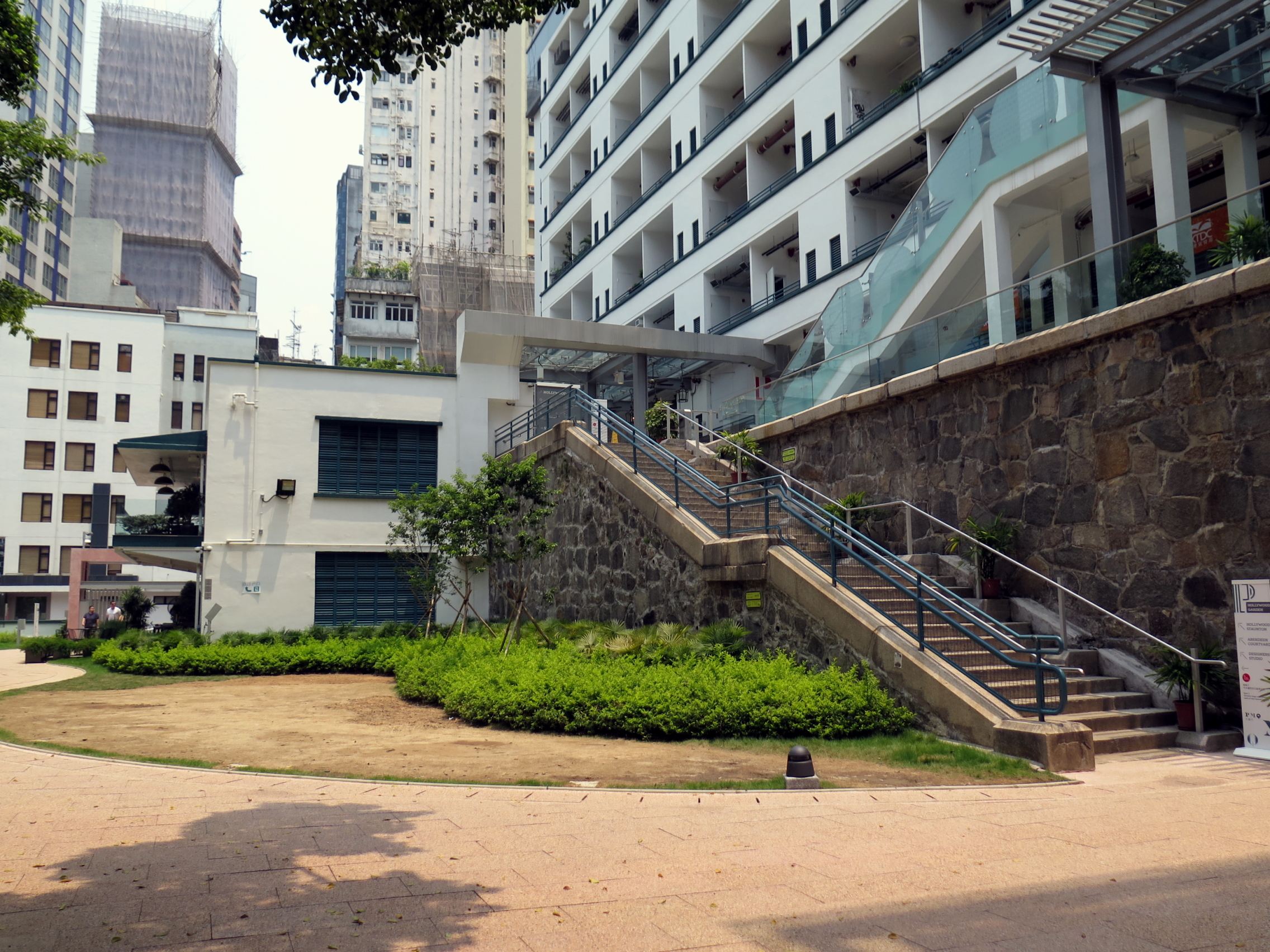
Granite steps of the Central School

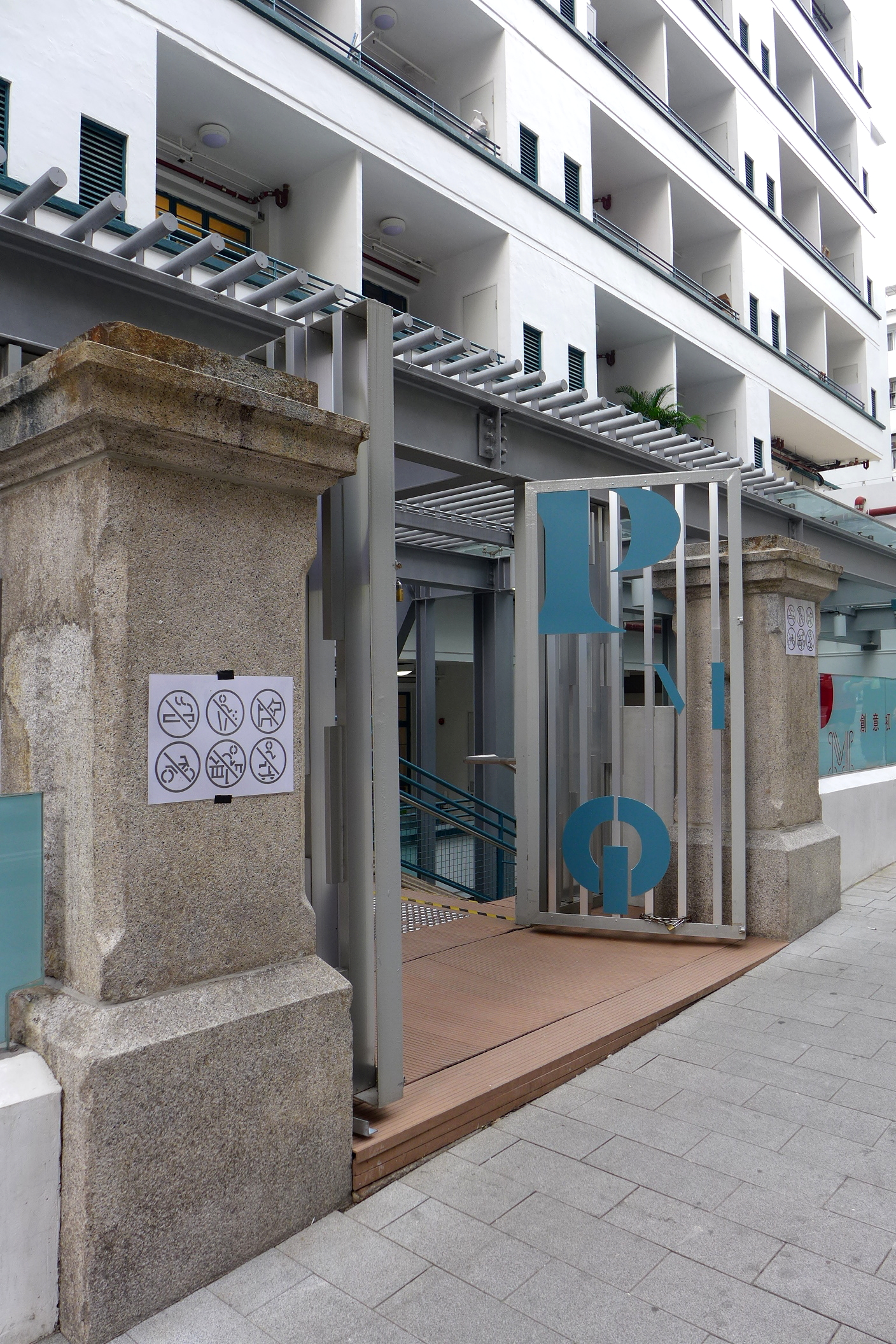
Entrance of the former Central School

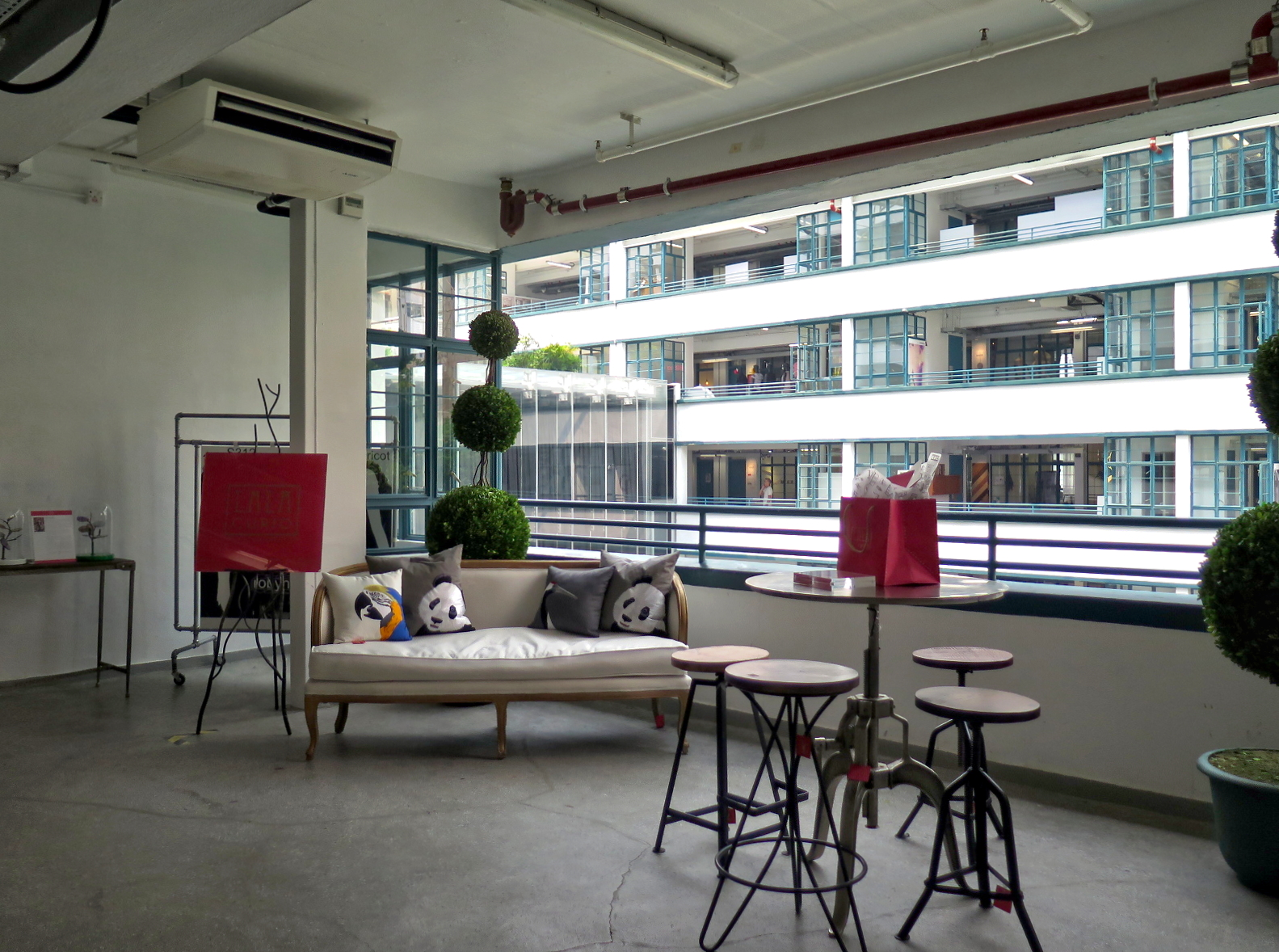
Shop display in PMQ

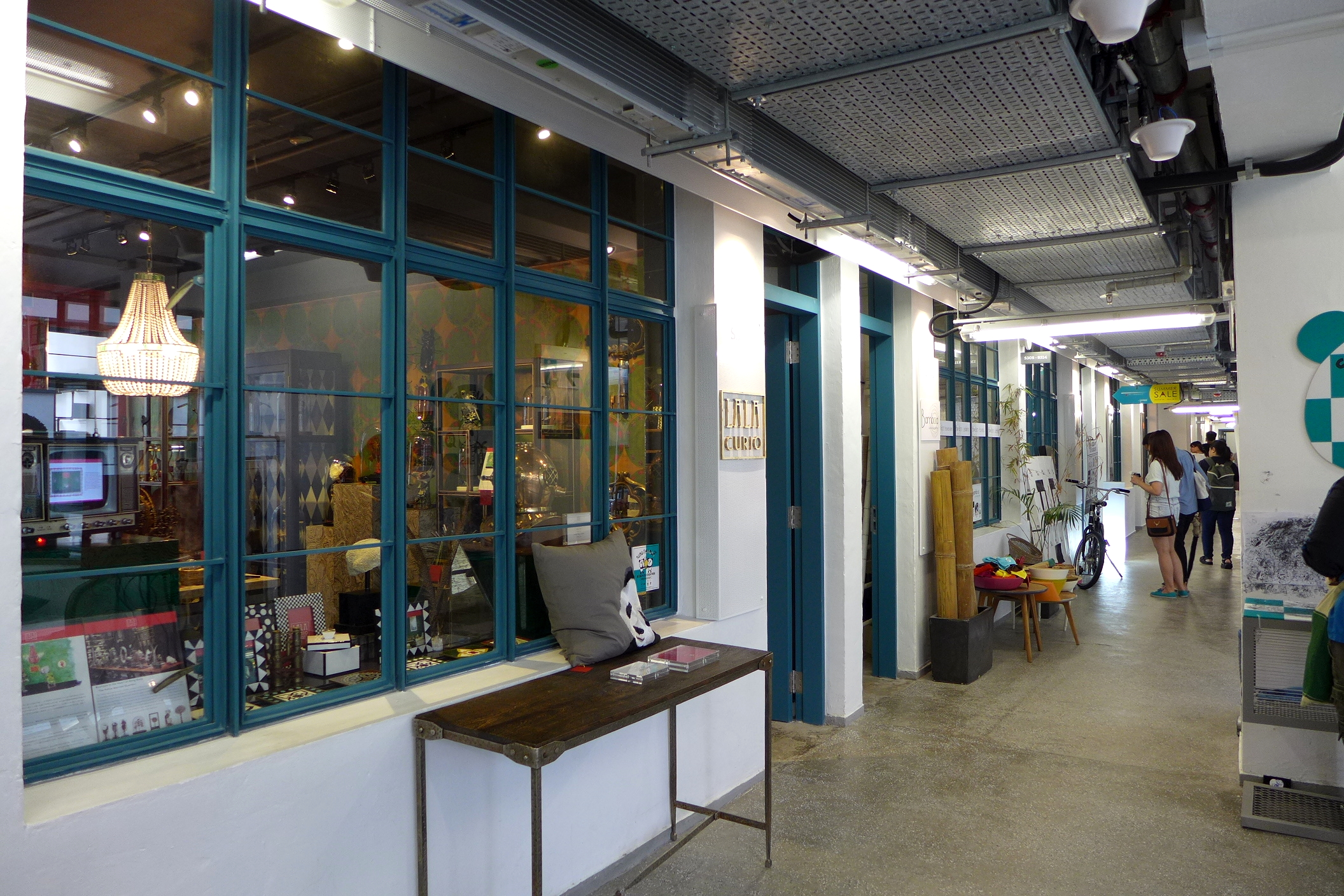
Shops in PMQ

== Special events ==
PMQ organizes free arts programs, events and workshops every month.

One special event is the monthly night market, which is divided into three parts: live band show, product design and food stalls.

Some international exhibitions are held in PMQ also. Previously, there were an international exhibition called “1600 Pandas” organized by WWF. In order to raise people's awareness of protecting the environment, the exhibition displayed 1600 paper-made pandas.

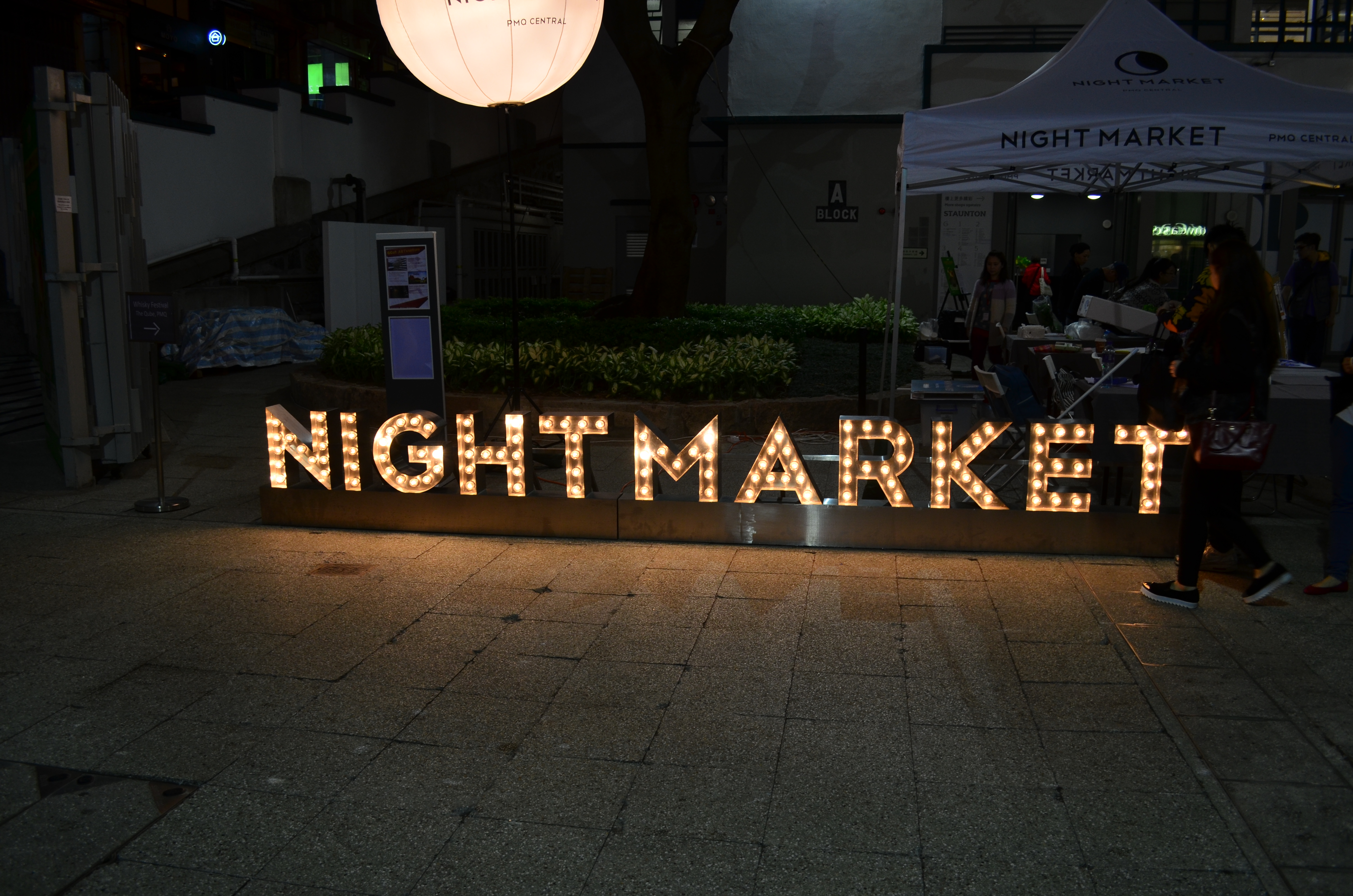
Night Market

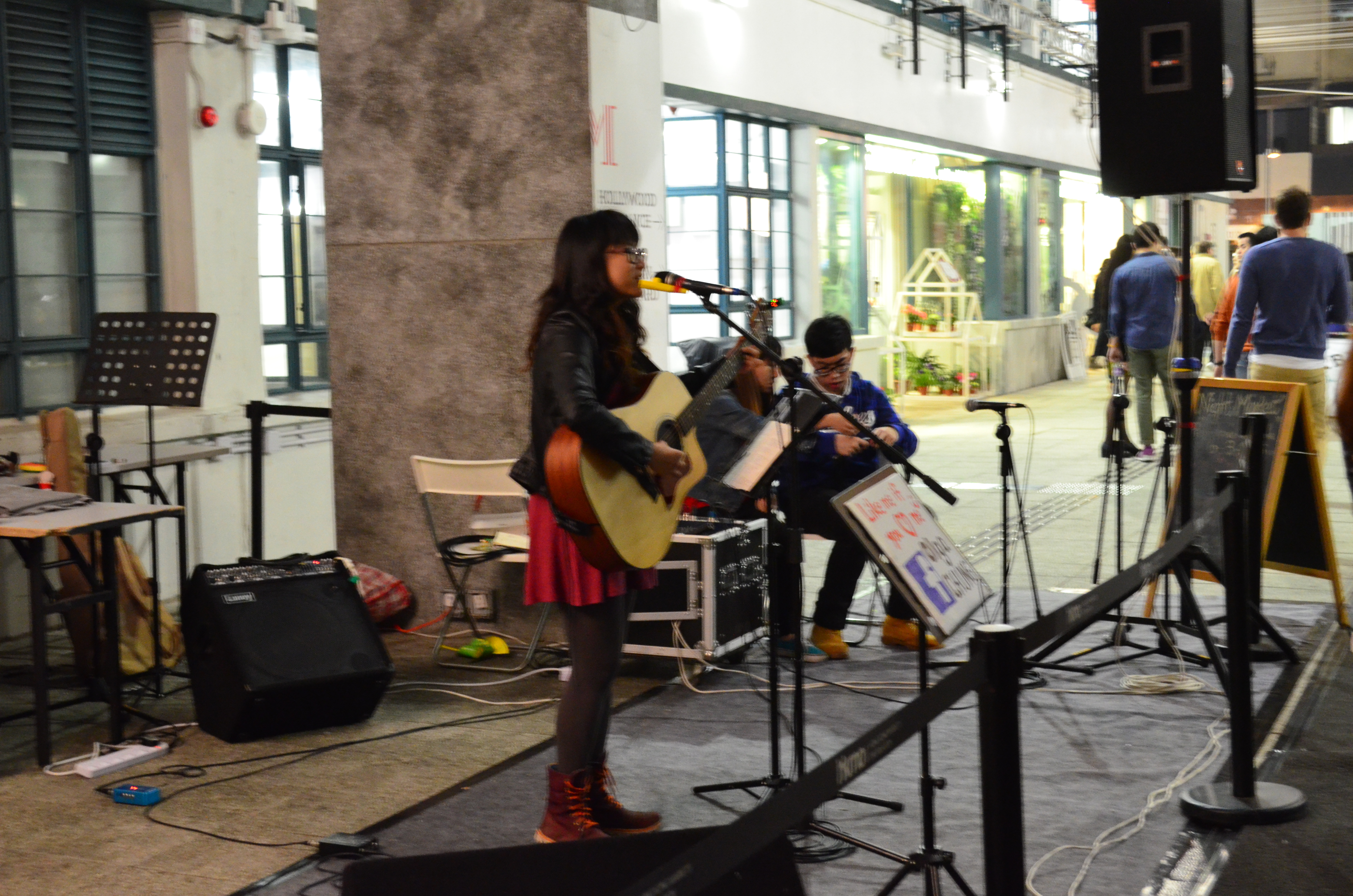
Live Band

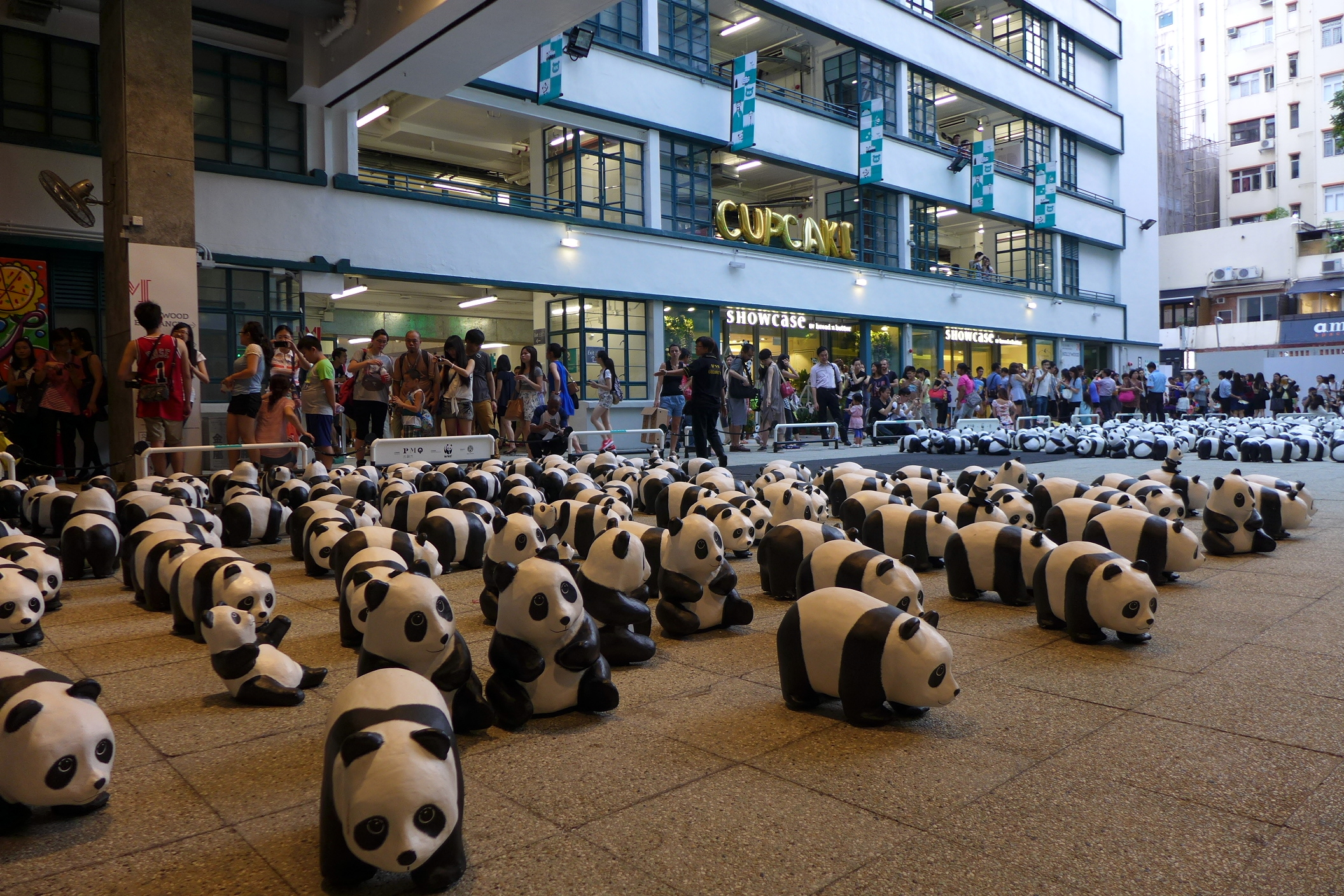
1600 pandas

== See also ==
- Historic police buildings in Hong Kong
- Three (2002 film)
