= Vali Asr, Mazandaran =

Vali Asr ولی عصر
- Village
- Interactive map of Vali Asr
- Coordinates: 36.5485°N 52.72°E
- Country: Iran
- Province: Mazandaran
- County: Babol
- Bakhsh: Central
- Rural District: Feyziyeh

Population (2016)
  - Total: 329
- Time zone: UTC+3:30 (IRST)

Vali Asr (Persian: ولی عصر, also Romanized as Valī ʿAşr) is a village in Feyziyeh Rural District, in the Central District of Babol County, Mazandaran Province, Iran.

At the time of the 2006 National Census, the village's population was 243. The following census in 2011 counted 292 people in 84 households. The 2016 census measured the population of the village as 329 people in 98 households.
