= Norwegian International School =

International school in Hong Kong

- 挪威國際學校

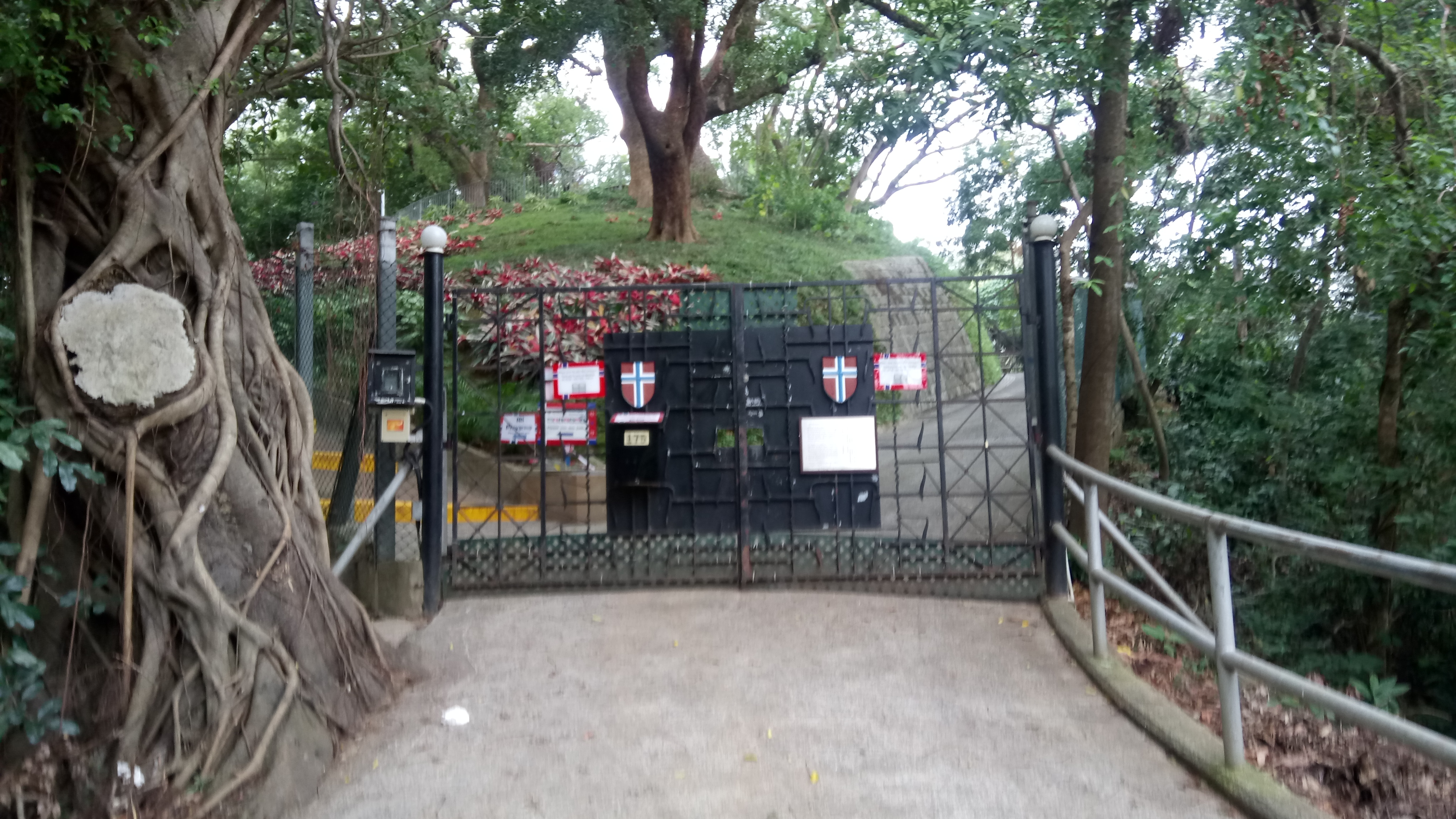
- Kindergarten Campus

Location
- 175 Kwong Fuk Road, Tai Po, New Territories; Hong Kong; 22.447938°N 114.170417°E

Information
- Type: Primary, international, co-educational
- Established: 1984
- Staff: 20
- Grades: Kindergarten (3 yrs) to Grade 6
- Enrollment: 200
- Affiliation: Christian
- Website: http://www.nis.edu.hk/

Norwegian International School
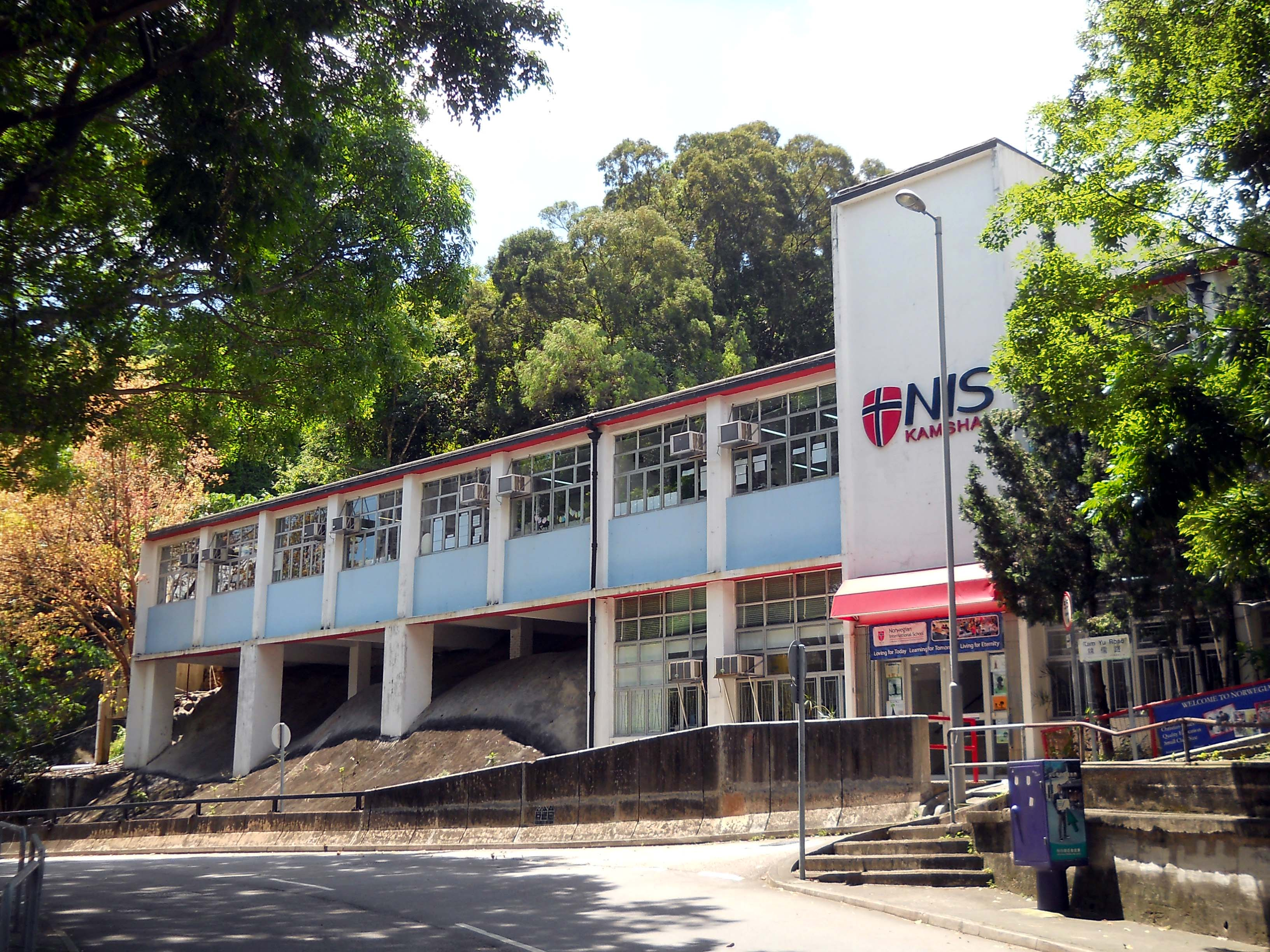
- Primary school campus
- Traditional Chinese: 挪威國際學校
- Simplified Chinese: 挪威国际学校
Transcriptions
Standard Mandarin
- Hanyu Pinyin: Nuówēi Guójì Xuéxiào
Yue: Cantonese
- Jyutping: no4 wai1 gwok3 zai3 hok6 haau6

Norwegian International School (Chinese: 挪威國際學校) located in Hong Kong was established in 1984. Originally named The Norwegian School, its purpose was primarily to provide an education for the children of Norwegian missionaries. During this period of the school's history, Norwegian was the medium of instruction, with English lessons conducted by teachers of English.

== History ==
In the 1981 the school began operations. Its first school building was in Tsim Sha Tsui. When the school began, its students were from Norway, Finland, and Sweden, but initially few students were from outside Scandinavia.

In 1985 the school began using a three-storey leased property in a former church in Kowloon; the church ended operations in 1983. In 1991 the building was up for sale and the school was to move to its current site. In 1991 the student count was 33. The school began operations in Tai Po in 1994. While the previous building housed a community center, the current one only had the capacity to house school operations.

At one point its programme was a Norwegian/Scandinavian one, but it changed to being an English medium international school with Norwegian culture and language classes for Norwegian students after a decrease in the number of Norwegian students.

In 2010, the Norwegian Mission board transferred ownership of NIS to Generations Christian Education. Today, within Generations Christian Education, there are three schools: NIS (kindergarten and primary campuses), Small World Christian Kindergarten and Island Christian Academy.

In 2015 the school was seeking a place for a new campus where it can begin secondary classes.

== Curriculum ==
The decision to change to an English curriculum was made, and in 1994 The Norwegian School opened its doors to students from different national backgrounds. In 2001 the name of the school was officially changed to Norwegian International School, and in 2003 the Norwegian Lutheran Mission became the sole owner of NIS. The school is a registered charitable organization in Hong Kong. Norwegian International School is now the home to about two hundred students, and offers classes ranging from Kindergarten (3 years old) to Year 6.

The school's learning program is based around the International Primary Curriculum (IPC) and International Early Years Curriculum (IEYC) (), inquiry based curricula based on international best practices for children aged 3–12.

== Campus ==
In the early years the school was located in a building on Cox Road in Tsim Sha Tsui. In 1994, the school was moved to the present location in Tai Po. The building, known as "The Tai Po Bungalow", is designated as a Grade II Historic Building under the Hong Kong Antiquities and Monument Ordinance. Built before World War II by the colonial government, it had a number of different occupants throughout its history including law enforcement services and civil servants. It is also believed to be used by the Japanese army during war times. The building sits on top of a natural hill surrounded by trees creating a naturally wooded playground. The classroom rooms in the building are intimately arranged resembling that of a house. In April 2008, the school has taken possession of 170 Kam Shan Road, Tai Po for Grade 1 to 6 classes. The Tai Po Bungalow is designated as the kindergarten campus.
