= Nis, Iran =

Nis نيس
- Village
- Location within Iran
- Coordinates: 32°13′00″N 48°21′00″E
- Country: Iran
- Province: Khuzestan
- County: Shush
- Bakhsh: Central
- Rural District: Hoseynabad

Population (2006)
  - Total: 221
- Time zone: UTC+3:30 (IRST)
  - Summer (DST): UTC+4:30 (IRDT)

Nis (Persian: نيس, also Romanized as Nīs and Neys; also known as Vālī-ye ‘Aşr) is a village in Hoseynabad Rural District, in the Central District of Shush County, Khuzestan Province, Iran. At the 2006 census, its population was 221, in 45 families.
